= Weimar =

- Town
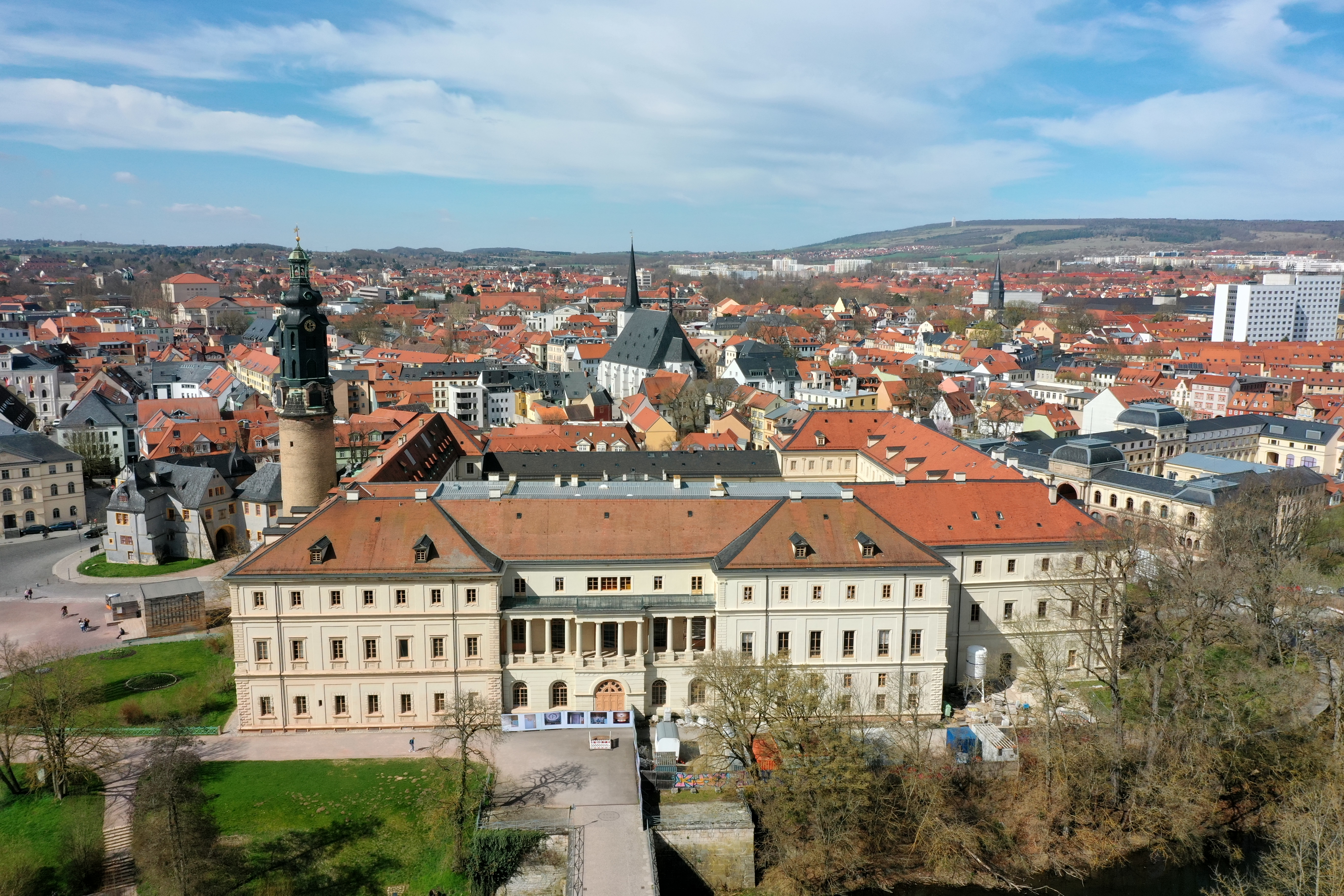
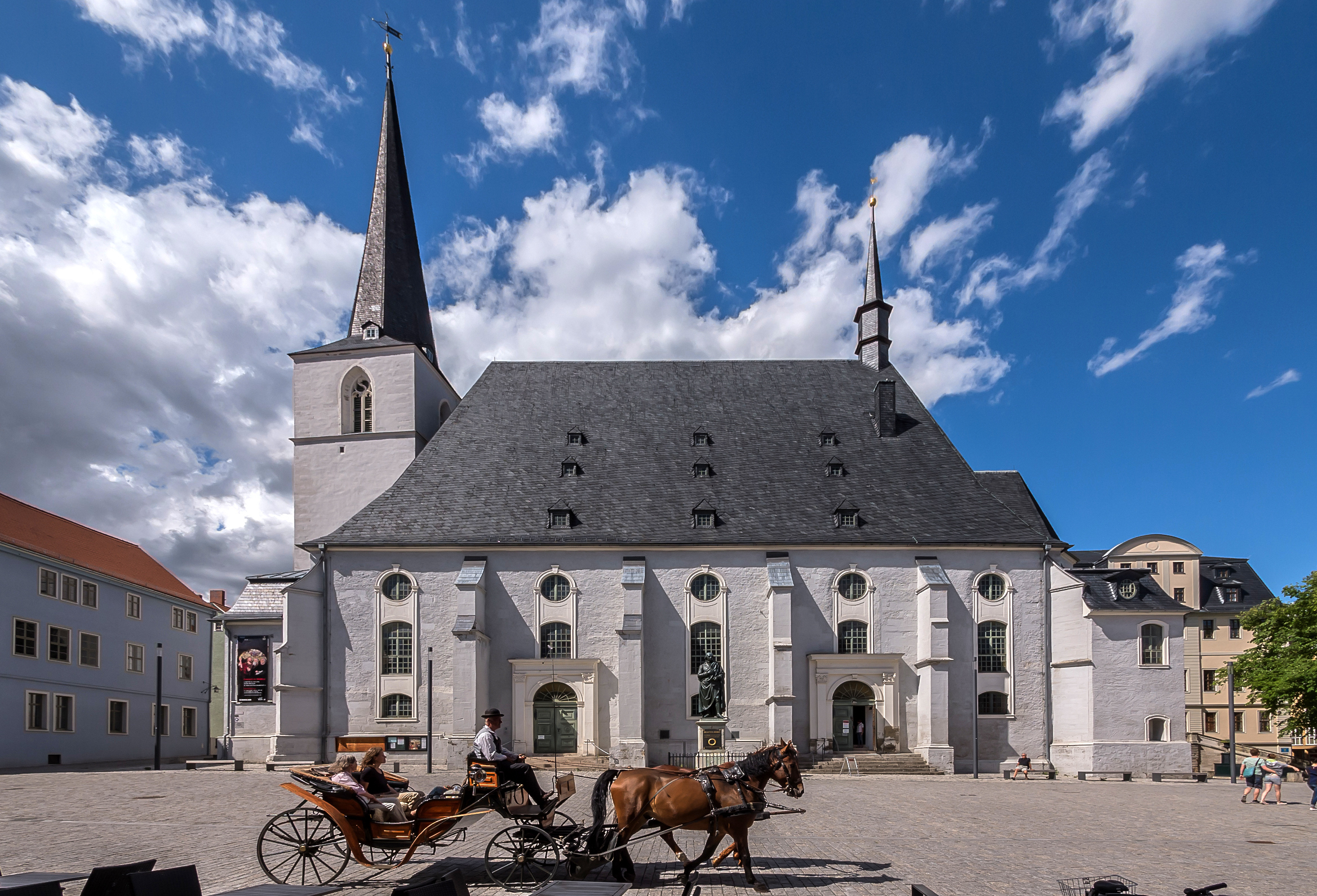
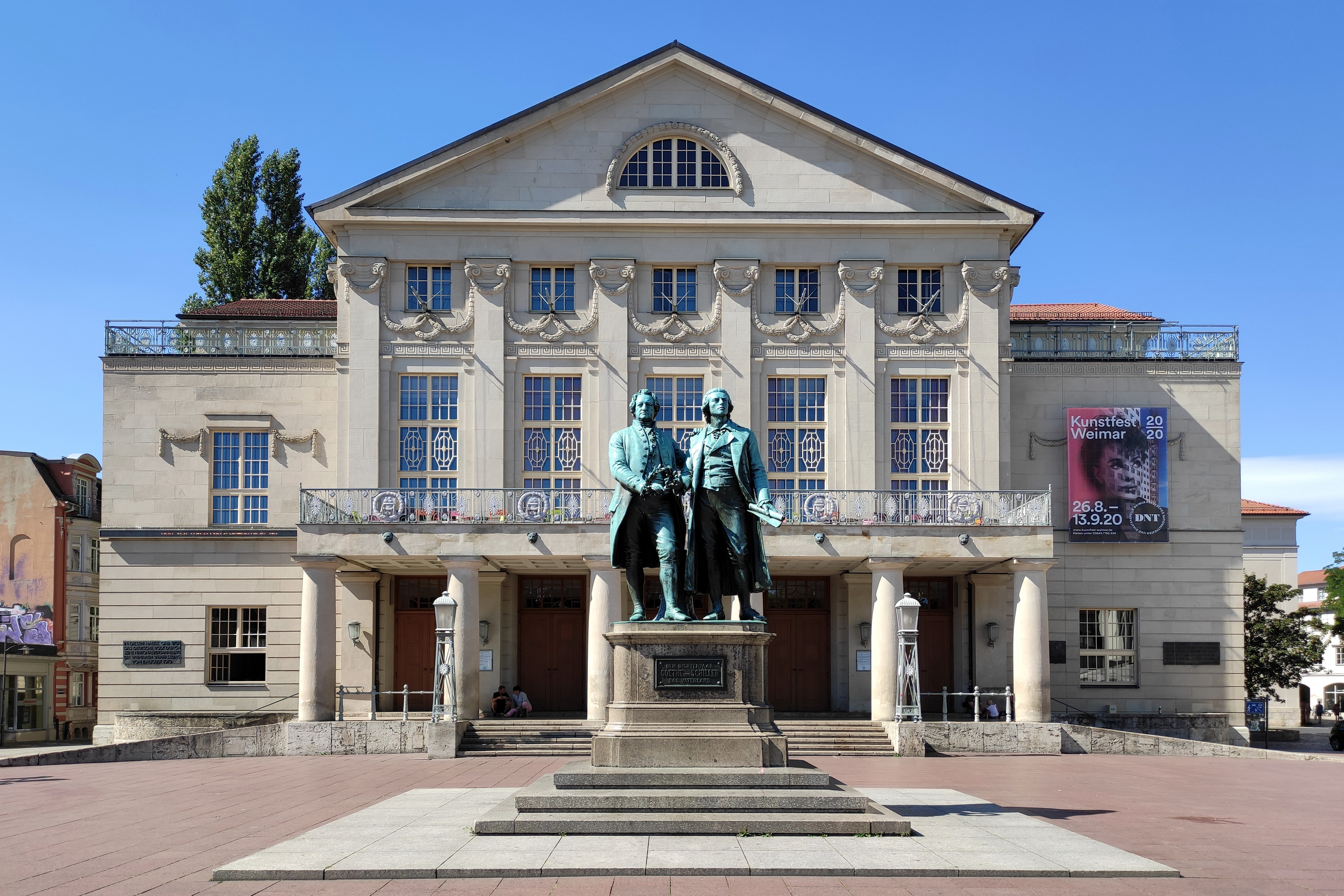
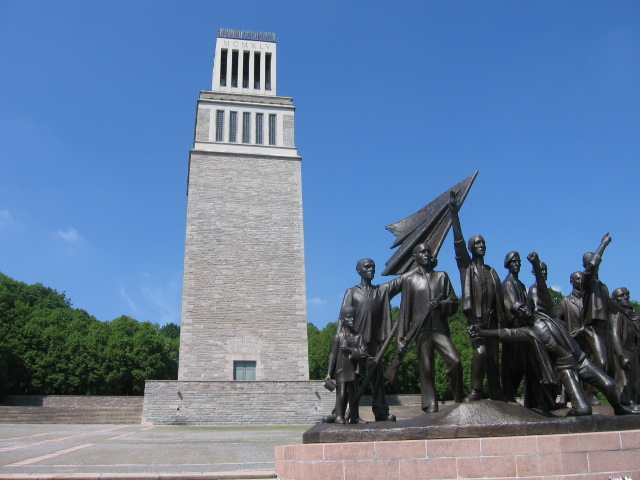
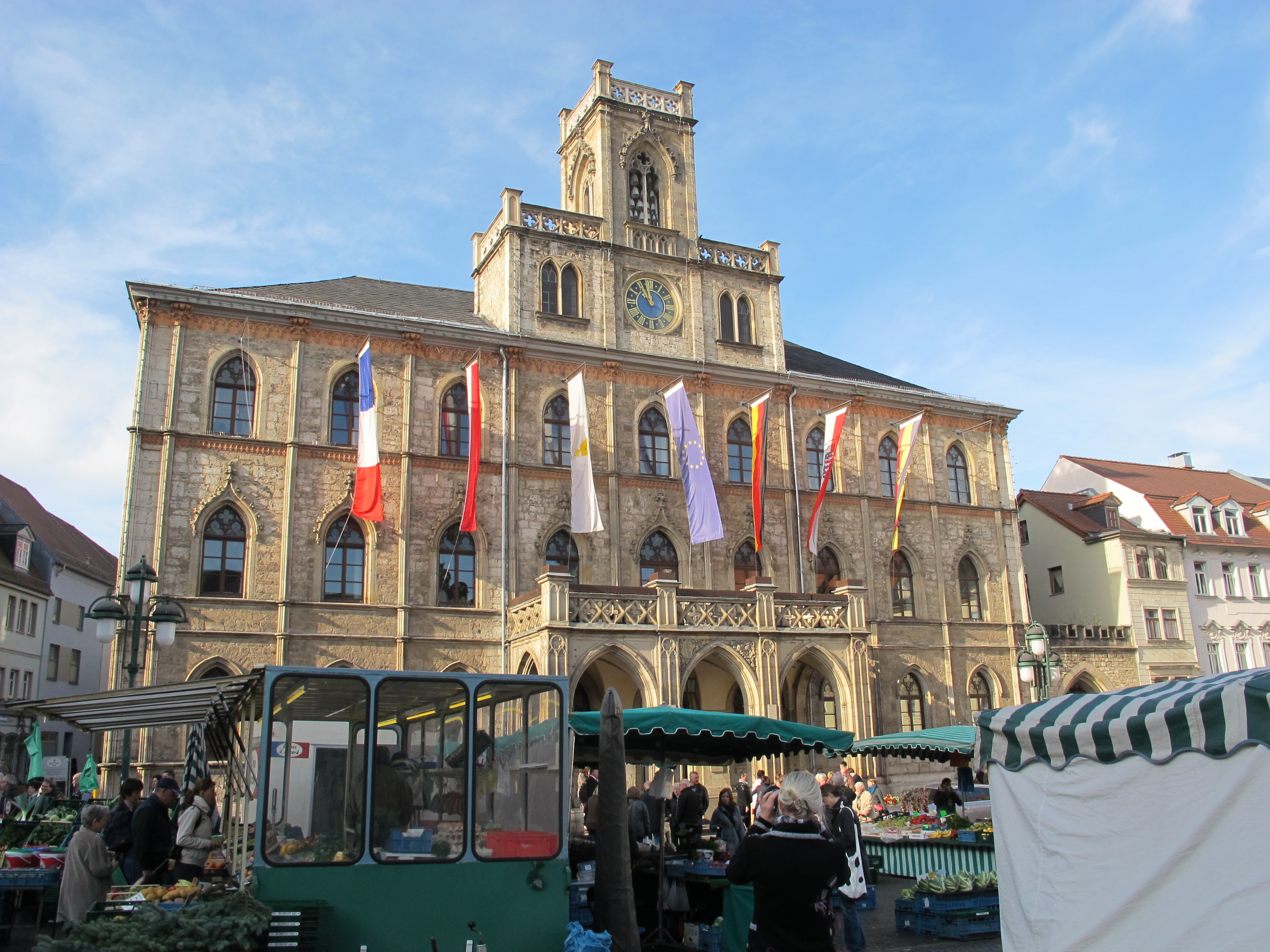
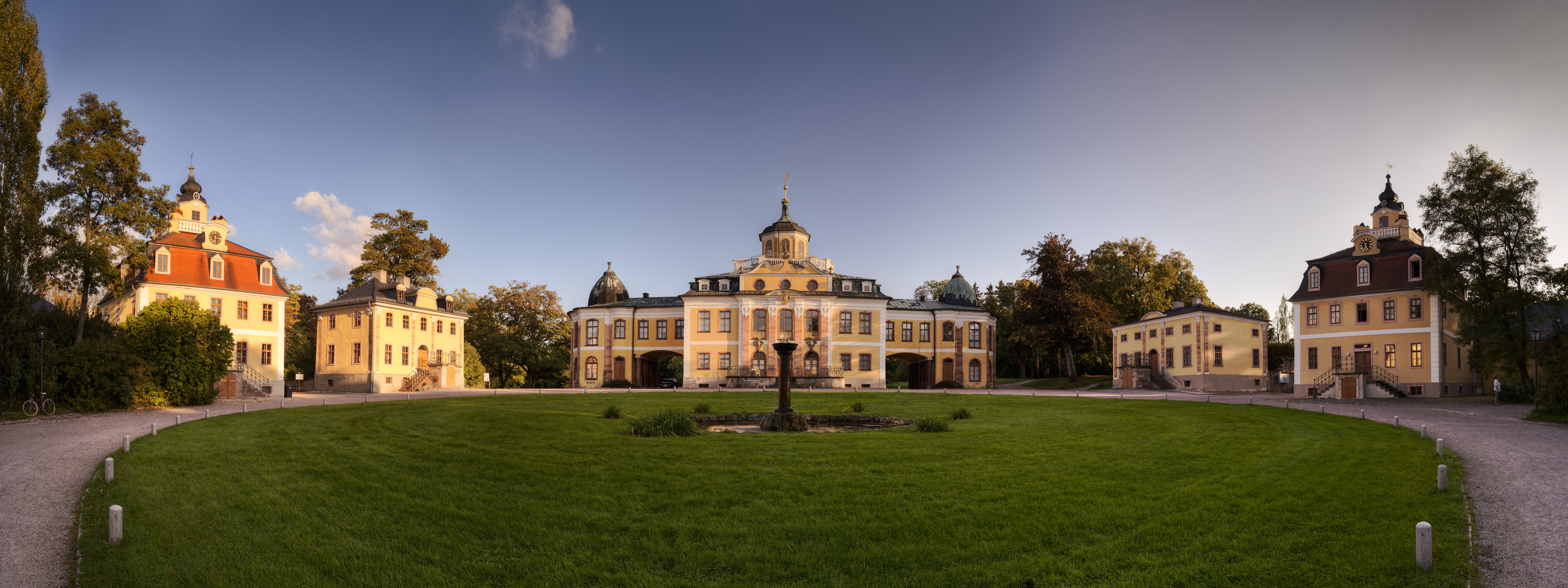
- View over Weimar with Schloss Weimar in the middle, Church of St. Peter und Paul, Weimar, Deutsches Nationaltheater und Staatskapelle Weimar with Goethe and Schiller Monument, Memorial of Buchenwald concentration camp, Town Hall Weimar and Schloss Belvedere, Weimar.

- Flag Coat of arms

- Location of Weimar within Thuringia
- Interactive map of Weimar
- Location within Germany Location within Thuringia
- Coordinates: 50°58′52″N 11°19′46″E
- Country: Germany
- State: Thuringia
- District: Urban district
- Subdivisions: 12 districts

Government
  - Mayor (2024–30): Peter Kleine

Area
  - Total: 84.48 km^{2} (32.62 sq mi)
- Elevation: 208 m (682 ft)

Population (2025-12-31)
  - Total: 65,954
  - Density: 780.7/km^{2} (2,022/sq mi)
- Time zone: UTC+01:00 (CET)
  - Summer (DST): UTC+02:00 (CEST)
- Postal codes: 99423, 99425, 99427, 99428
- Dialling codes: 03643, 036453
- Vehicle registration: WE
- Website: weimar.de

Weimar (Note: English: /ˈvaɪmɑːr/ VY-mar or /ˈwaɪmɑːr/ WY-mar, German: [ˈvaɪmaʁ]; Latin: Vimaria or Vinaria.) is a city in the German state of Thuringia, in Central Germany between Erfurt to the west and Jena to the east, 80 km (50 mi) southwest of Leipzig, 170 km (106 mi) north of Nuremberg and 170 km (106 mi) west of Dresden. Together with the neighbouring cities of Erfurt and Jena, it forms the central metropolitan area of Thuringia, with approximately 500,000 inhabitants. The city itself has a population of 65,000. Weimar is well known because of its cultural heritage and importance in German history.

The city was a focal point of the German Enlightenment and home of the leading literary figures of Weimar Classicism, Johann Wolfgang von Goethe and Friedrich Schiller. In the 19th century, composers such as Franz Liszt made Weimar a music centre. Later, artists and architects including Henry van de Velde, Wassily Kandinsky, Paul Klee, Lyonel Feininger, and Walter Gropius came to the city and founded the Bauhaus movement, the most important German design school of the interwar period.

The political history of 20th-century Weimar was volatile: it was the place where Germany's first democratic constitution was signed after the First World War, giving its name to the Weimar Republic (1918–33), which existed between the end of World War I and the rise of the Nazis. It was also one of the cities mythologized by Nazi propaganda.

Until 1948, Weimar was the capital of Thuringia. Many places in the city centre have been designated as UNESCO World Heritage Sites, either as part of the Classical Weimar complex (containing monuments to the classical period of Weimar in 18th and 19th centuries) or the Bauhaus complex (containing buildings associated with the Bauhaus art school). Heritage tourism is one of the leading economic sectors of Weimar.

Noted institutions in Weimar are the Bauhaus University, the Liszt School of Music, the Duchess Anna Amalia Library, and two leading courts of Thuringia (the Supreme Administrative Court and Constitutional Court). In 1999, Weimar was the European Capital of Culture.

== History ==
=== Prehistoric times ===
Archaeological finds dating back to the Thuringii epoch (3rd to 6th centuries) show that the Weimar part of the Ilm valley was settled early. A tight network of settlements occupied much of the area of today's city.

=== Middle Ages ===
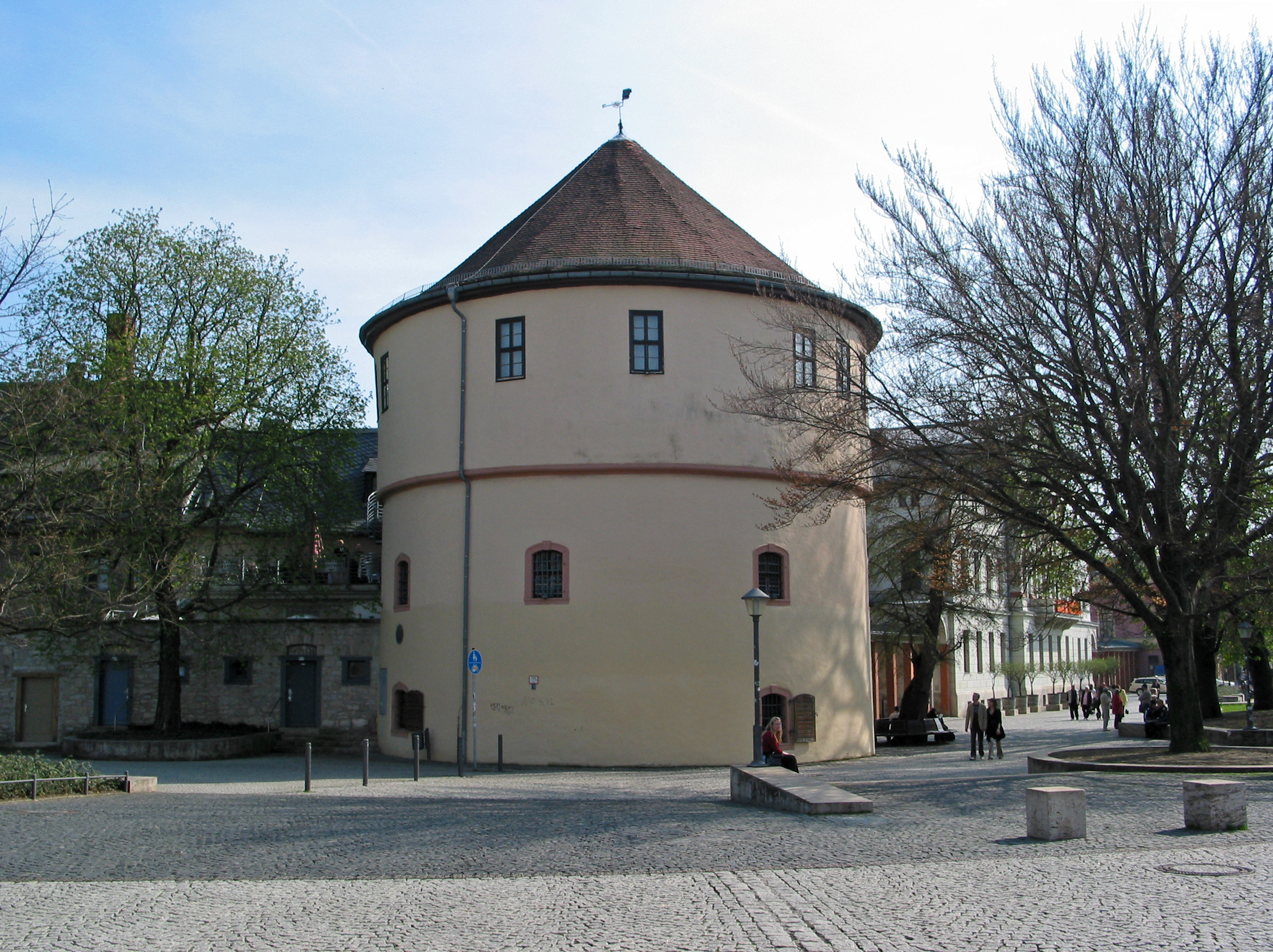
The Kasseturm is a relic of the former city wall at Goetheplatz.

The oldest records regarding Weimar date to 899. Its name changed over the centuries from Wimares through Wimari to Wimar and finally Weimar; it is derived from Old High German wīh- (holy) and -mari (standing water, swamp). The place was the seat of the County of Weimar, first mentioned in 949, which was one of the most powerful jurisdictions in early Middle Ages Thuringia. In 1062 it was united with the County of Orlamünde into the new County of Weimar-Orlamünde, which existed until the Thuringian Counts' War in 1346. It fell to the Wettins afterwards.

The Weimar settlement emerged around the count's wooden castle and two small churches, dedicated to Saint Peter (which later became the main church), and to Saint James, respectively. In 1240, the count founded the dynasty's monastery in Oberweimar, run by Cistercian nuns. Soon after, the counts of Weimar founded the town, which was an independent parish since 1249 and called civitas in 1254. From 1262, the citizens used their own seal. The regional influence of the Weimar counts was declining as the influence of the Wettins in Thuringia increased. Hence, the new small town was relatively marginal in a regional context, also due to the fact that it was located far from relevant trade routes, such as the Via Regia. The settlement around Saint James Church developed into a suburb during the 13th century.

After becoming part of Wettin territory in 1346, urban development improved. The Wettins fostered Weimar by abolishing socage and granting privileges to the citizens. Now Weimar became equal to other Wettinian cities like Weißensee and grew during the 15th century, with the establishment of a town hall and the current main church. In 1438 Weimar acquired trade privileges for woad, a plant from which blue dye was made. The castle and the walls were finished in the 16th century, making Weimar into a full city.

=== Early Modern Period ===
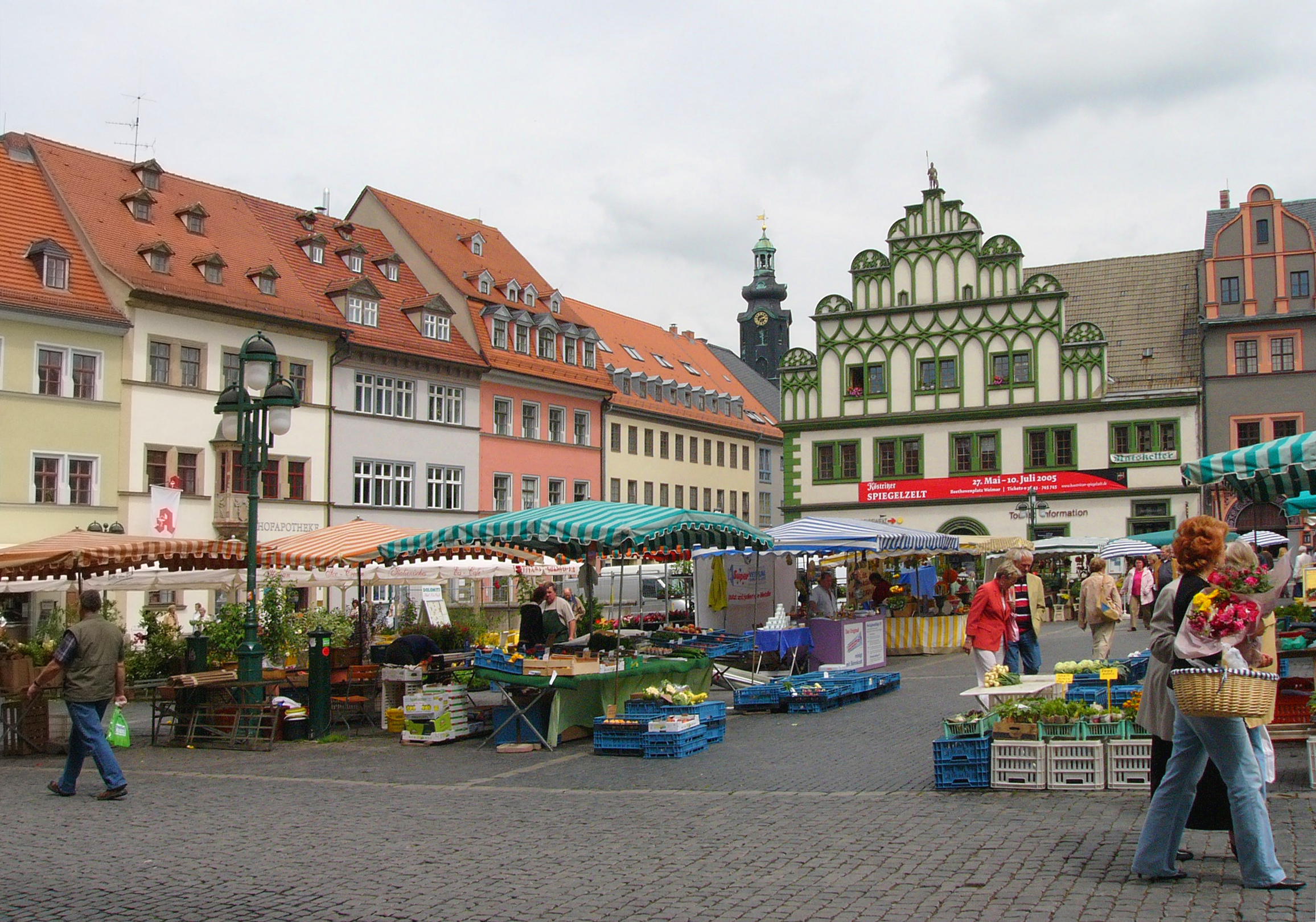
Market Square with some 16th-century Renaissance patricians' houses

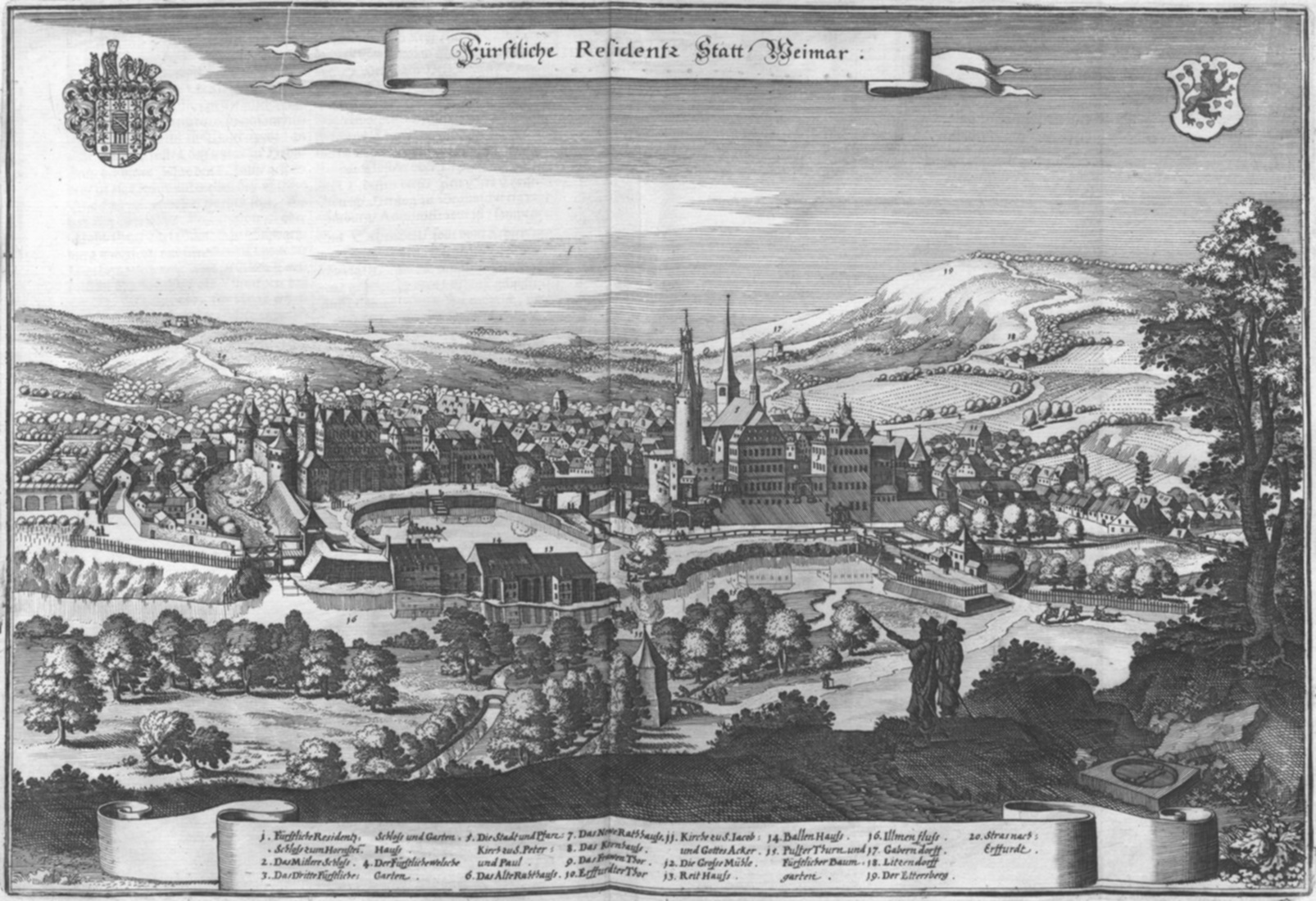
Weimar in 1650

After the Treaty of Leipzig (1485) Weimar became part of the electorate of the Ernestine branch of Wettins with Wittenberg as capital. The Protestant Reformation was introduced in Weimar in 1525; Martin Luther stayed several times in the city. As the Ernestines lost the Schmalkaldic War in 1547, their capital Wittenberg went also to the Albertines, so that they needed a new residence. As the ruler returned from captivity, Weimar became his residence in 1552 and remained as such until the end of the monarchy in 1918. The first Ernestine territorial partition in 1572 was followed by various ones, nevertheless Weimar stayed the capital of different Saxe-Weimar states. The court and its staff brought some wealth to the city, so that it saw a first construction boom in the 16th century. The 17th century brought decline to Weimar, because of changing trade conditions (as in nearby Erfurt). Besides, the territorial partitions led to the loss of political importance of the dukes of Saxe-Weimar and their finances shrunk. The city's polity weakened more and more and lost its privileges, leading to the absolutist reign of the dukes in the early 18th century. On the other hand, this time brought another construction boom to Weimar, and the city got its present appearance, marked by various ducal representation buildings. The city walls were demolished in 1757 and during the following decades, Weimar expanded in all directions. The biggest building constructed in this period was the Schloss as the residence of the dukes (north and east wing: 1789–1803, west wing 1832–1835, south wing: 1913–1914). Between 1708 and 1717 Johann Sebastian Bach worked as the court's organist in Weimar.

=== Golden or Classical Age (1758–1832) ===
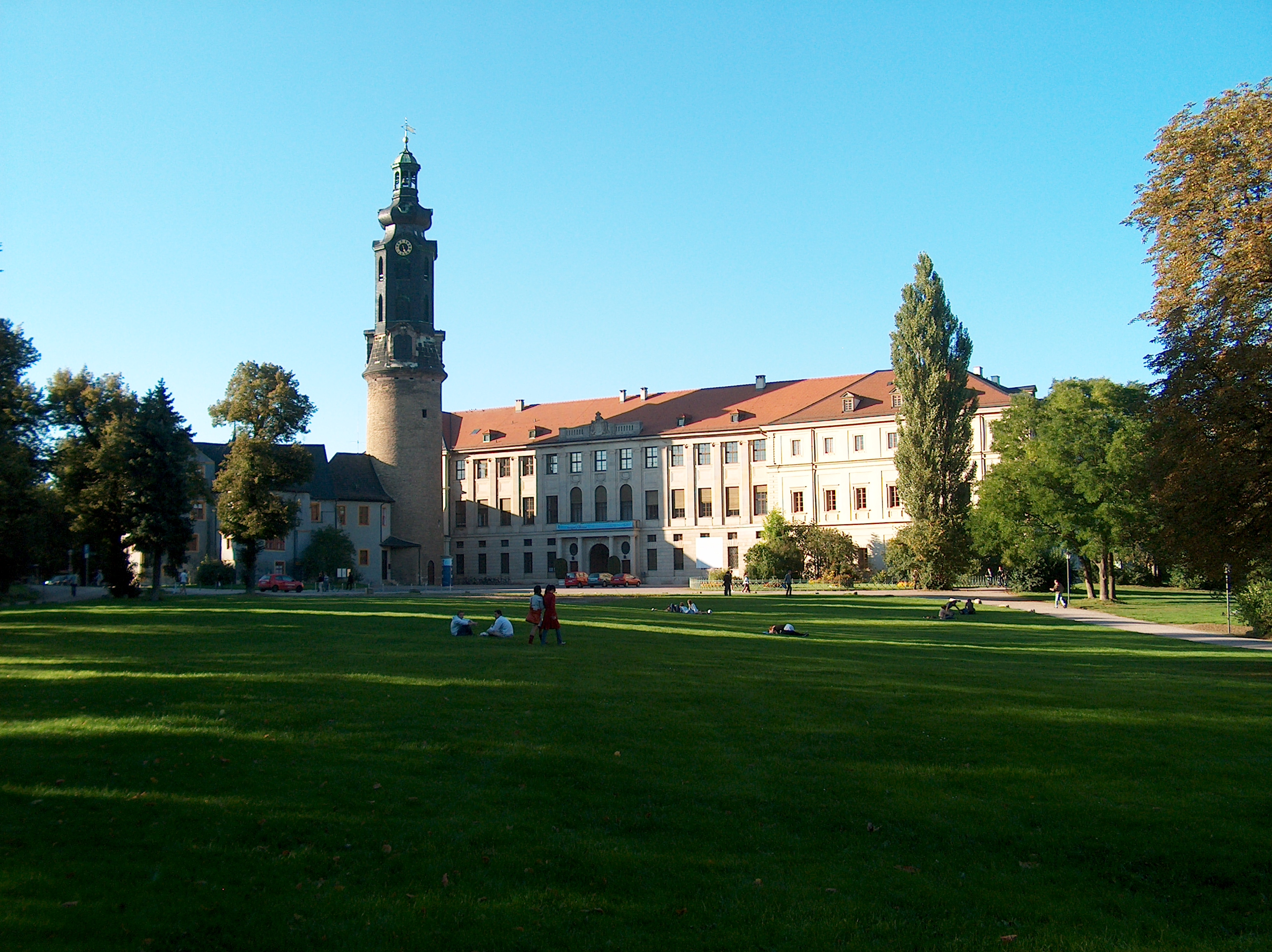
The Grand-Ducal Palace

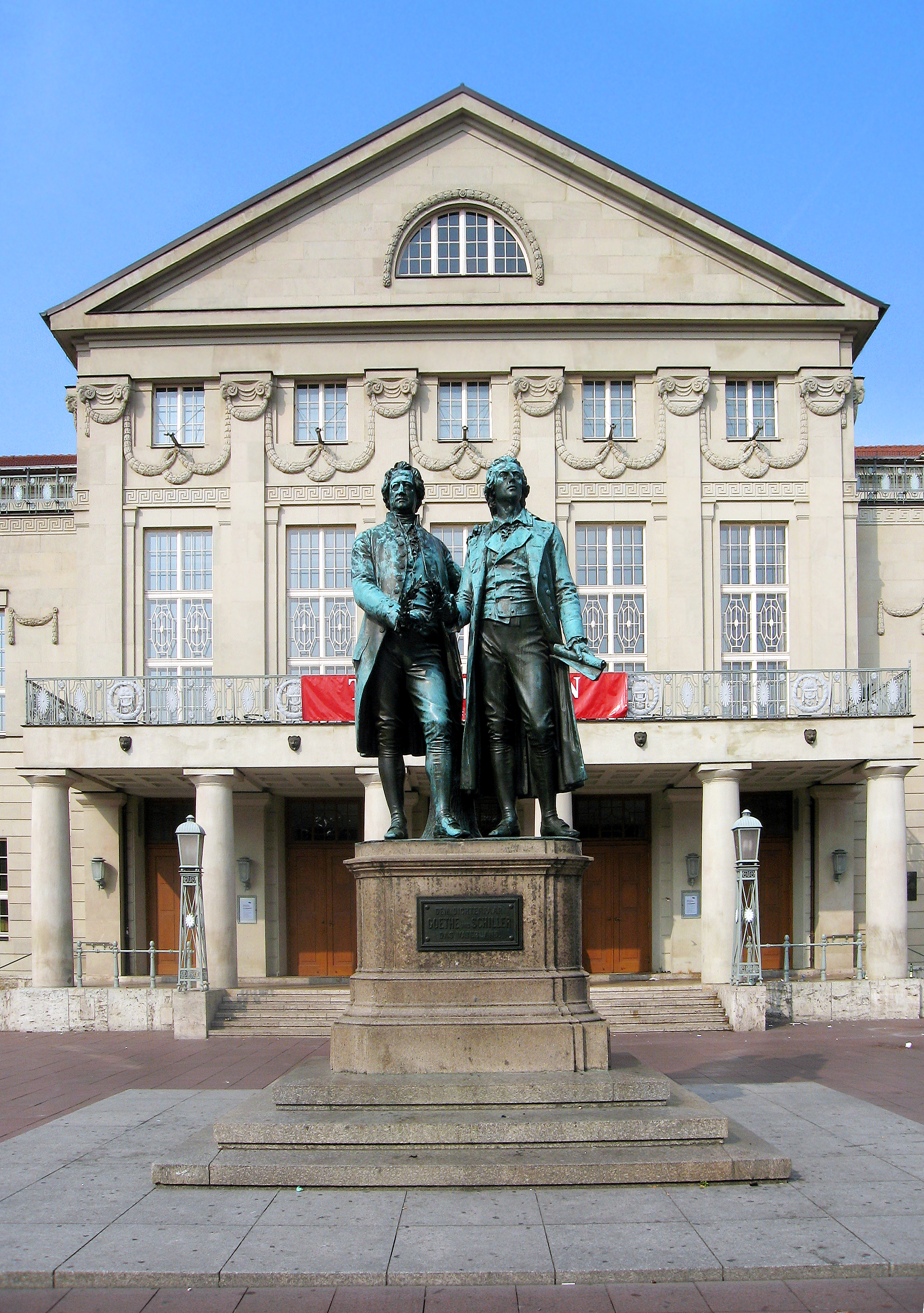
The Goethe-Schiller Monument in front of the Deutsches Nationaltheater and Staatskapelle Weimar

The period from the start of the regencies of Anna Amalia (1758–1775) and her son Carl August (1775–1828) through to Goethe's death in 1832 is denoted as the "golden" or the "classical" age because of the high level of cultural activity in Weimar. The city became an important cultural centre of Europe, having been home to literary figures including Goethe, Schiller, Herder, Wieland and Bertuch; and in music the piano virtuoso Hummel. It has been a site of pilgrimage for the German intelligentsia since Goethe first moved to Weimar in 1775. Goethe was also active in civic duties while living there. He served as Privy Councilor to the Grand Duke of Saxe-Weimar-Eisenach for an extended period. The tombs of Goethe and Schiller, as well as their archives, may be found in the city. Goethe's Elective Affinities (1809) is set around the city of Weimar. In comparison to many major German states, the dukes' policy was liberal and tolerant in this period. The liberal Saxe-Weimar constitution was brought into effect in 1816.

=== Silver Ages and The New Weimar (1832–1918) ===
The time after Goethe's death is denoted as the "silver" age because Weimar remained an influential cultural centre. The first emphasis was fostering music. In 1842, Franz Liszt moved to Weimar to become the Grand Ducal court conductor. Liszt organized the premiere of Richard Wagner's Lohengrin (1850) as well as the world première of Saint Saëns' opera Samson et Delilah (1877) in the city. The Weimar School of Music was founded in 1872 as Germany's first orchestra school. Richard Strauss worked in Weimar between 1889 and 1894 as second conductor in the acclaimed Staatskapelle Weimar (the court orchestra founded in 1491). Several of his encores for works such as Don Juan and Macbeth were performed by the Staatskapelle Weimar. He also premièred Humperdinck's opera Hänsel and Gretel 1893 in Weimar. Friedrich Nietzsche moved to Weimar in 1897, and died there three years later.

In 1860 the Weimar Saxon-Grand Ducal Art School, the precursor of today's Bauhaus University, was founded. This was the beginning of academic arts education in Weimar. The institution created its own painting style, the Weimar School of painting with representatives such as Max Liebermann and Arnold Böcklin. The Kunstgewerbeschule Weimar was found by Henry van de Velde with the support of Grand Duke William Ernest in 1902 and represents the other root of Bauhaus, known as "Das Neue Weimar" ("The New Weimar") around Harry Graf Kessler. It was a foundation against Prussia's restrictive arts policy favouring Historicism instead of international Arts and Crafts and Art Nouveau.

As early as the 19th century, the curation of Weimar and its heritage started. Many archives, societies and museums were founded to present and conserve the cultural sights and goods. In 1846, Weimar was connected by the Thuringian Railway. In the following decades, the city saw a construction and population boom (like most late-19th century cities in Germany). Nevertheless, Weimar did not become industrialised, and remained a city of clerks, artists and rentiers. During the German Revolution of 1918–19 the last reigning grand duke of Saxe-Weimar-Eisenach, William Ernest, had to abdicate and went in exile to Heinrichau in Silesia.

=== Weimar Republic ===
The period in German history from 1919 to 1933 is commonly referred to as the Weimar Republic, as the Republic's constitution was drafted there rather than Berlin. The capital was considered too dangerous for the National Assembly to use as a meeting place because of street rioting during the Spartacist uprising. Reich President Friedrich Ebert favored Weimar because he hoped it would remind the victorious Allies of Weimar Classicism while they were deliberating the terms of the Treaty of Versailles. Since the calm and centrally located Weimar had a suitable place of assembly (the theatre), hotels and infrastructure, it was chosen as the host city.

In 1920, the federal state of Thuringia was founded by an association of eight former microstates (Saxe-Weimar-Eisenach, Saxe-Gotha, Saxe-Altenburg, Saxe-Meiningen, Schwarzburg-Rudolstadt, Schwarzburg-Sondershausen, Reuss-Gera and Reuss-Greiz) and Weimar became its capital. Due to that fact, the city experienced another period of growth.

In 1919, Walter Gropius founded the Bauhaus School by a merger of the Weimar Saxon-Grand Ducal Art School with the Kunstgewerbeschule Weimar. The Bauhaus in Weimar lasted from 1919 to 1925, when it moved to Dessau, after the newly elected right-wing Thuringian council put pressure on the school by withdrawing funding and forcing its teachers to quit. Many buildings in Weimar today have influences from the Bauhaus period. However, only one original Bauhaus building was constructed during 1919–1925, the Haus am Horn, now used for exhibitions and events on Bauhaus culture.

The Weimar Republic era was marked by a constant conflict between progressive and Völkisch forces, the former represented by Harry Graf Kessler and the latter by Adolf Bartels in Weimar. The Weimarer Zeitung was published in Weimar as a local newspaper. After 1929, the right-wing forces prevailed and Weimar became an early centre of Nazism.

=== Nazi Germany and World War II ===
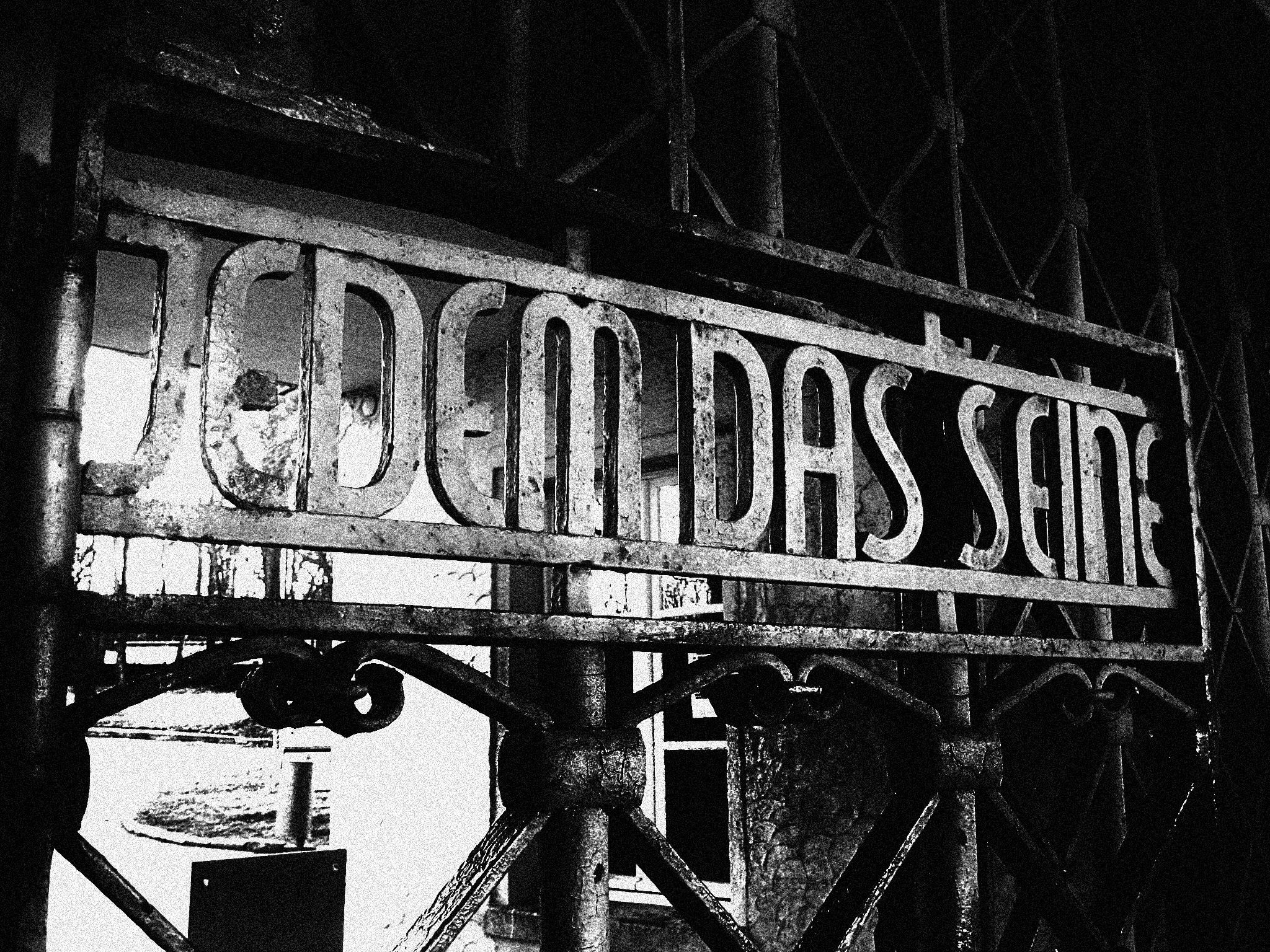
Buchenwald's main gate, with the slogan Jedem das Seine ("to each his own")

Weimar was important to the Nazis for two reasons: first, it was where the hated Weimar Republic was founded, and second, it had been a centre of German high culture in recent centuries. In 1926, the NSDAP held its party convention in Weimar. Adolf Hitler visited Weimar more than forty times prior to 1933. In 1930, Wilhelm Frick became minister for internal affairs and education in Thuringia – the first NSDAP minister in Germany. In 1932, the NSDAP came to power in Thuringia under Fritz Sauckel. In 1933, the first Nazi concentration camps were established around Weimar in Nohra (the first one in Germany) and Bad Sulza. Most prisoners at this time were communists and social democrats. After Kristallnacht in 1938, harassment of Jews became more intense, so that many of them emigrated or were arrested. The Weimar Synagogue was destroyed in 1938.

During the 1930s, the barracks in Weimar was greatly extended. One famous person serving as a soldier in Weimar was Wolfgang Borchert, later a well known poet and playwright. As it was the capital of Thuringia, the Nazis built a new Roman-fascist-style administrative centre between the city centre and the main station. This Gauforum, designed by Hermann Giesler, was the only Nazi governmental building completed outside Berlin (though there were plans for all German state capitals). Today it hosts the Thuringian State Administration. Other Giesler buildings are the Villa Sauckel, the governor's palace and the Hotel Elephant in the city centre.

In 1937, the Nazis established Buchenwald concentration camp 8 km (5.0 mi) from Weimar city centre. Between July 1938 and April 1945, some 240,000 people were incarcerated in the camp by the Nazi regime, including 168 Western Allied POWs. The number of deaths in Buchenwald is estimated at 56,545. The Buchenwald concentration camp provided slave labour for local industry, including the Wilhelm-Gustloff-Werk arms factory.

The city centre was partially damaged by US Air Force bombing in 1945 with some 1,800 people killed and many historic buildings destroyed. Nevertheless, most of the destroyed buildings were restored soon after the war because of their importance in German cultural history. The Allied ground advance into Germany reached Weimar in April 1945, and the city surrendered to the US 80th Infantry Division on 12 April 1945. The residents of Weimar were ordered to walk through Buchenwald, to see what had been happening so close to the city, as documented in Billy Wilder's film Death Mills. The city ended up in the Soviet occupation zone of Germany, so US troops were soon replaced by Soviet forces.

=== Since 1945 ===
From 1945 to 1950, the Soviet Union used the occupied Buchenwald concentration camp as a NKVD special camp to imprison defeated Nazis and other Germans. The camp slogan remained Jedem das Seine. On 6 January 1950, the Soviets handed over Buchenwald to the East German Ministry of Internal Affairs.

In 1948, the East German government declared Erfurt as Thuringia's new capital, and Weimar lost its influence on German contemporary culture and politics. (The state of Thuringia itself was dissolved in 1952 and replaced by three Bezirke (districts) in a local government reform; Weimar belonged to the Bezirk of Erfurt.) The city was the headquarters of the Soviet Union's 8th Guards Army as part of the Group of Soviet Forces in Germany. Due to its fame and importance for tourism, Weimar received more financial subsidies from the GDR government and remained in better condition than most East German cities.

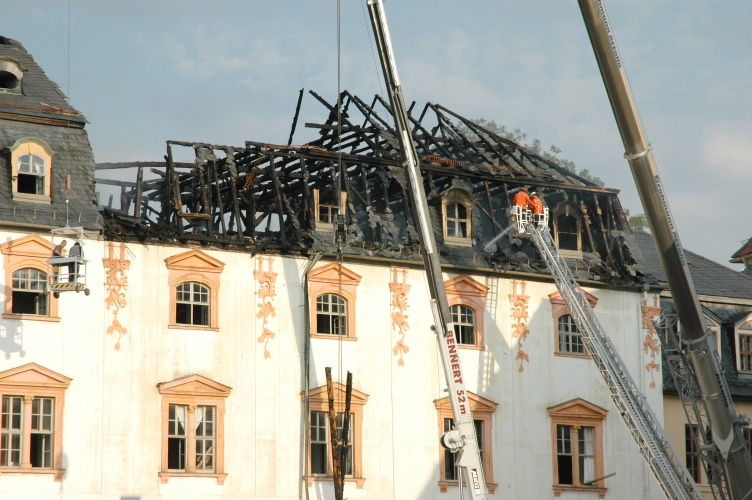
The destroyed Anna Amalia Library in 2004

After German reunification in 1990, Weimar experienced significant economic hardship, but funding restored much that had deteriorated. In 1991, the city hosted the first trilateral meeting between the foreign ministers of Germany, France and Poland giving its name to the Weimar Triangle format. It was designated as a UNESCO World Heritage Site in 1996 (Bauhaus) and 1998 (Classical Weimar). The European Council of Ministers selected the city as European Capital of Culture for 1999. Tourism has become an important economic factor over the decades. Weimar is now a popular residence of people working in Erfurt and Jena, both less than 20 minutes away.

In 2004, a fire broke out at the Duchess Anna Amalia Library. The library contains a 13,000-volume collection including Goethe's masterpiece Faust, as well as the duchess's music collection. An authentic Luther Bible from 1534 was saved from the fire. The library is one of the oldest in Europe, dating back to 1691, and is listed as a UNESCO World Heritage Site. Over one million volumes were housed in the library, of which forty to fifty thousand were damaged beyond repair. A number of books were shock-frozen in Leipzig to save them from rotting. The library was reopened in 2007.

== Geography and demographics ==
=== Topography ===
Weimar is situated within the valley of the Ilm river, a tributary of the Saale river on the southern border of the Thuringian Basin, a fertile agricultural area between the Harz mountains 70 km (43 mi) to the north and the Thuringian Forest 50 km (31 mi) to the southwest. The municipal terrain is hilly; the height of the city centre in the Ilm valley is approximately 200 m of elevation. To the north, the terrain rises to Ettersberg, the city's backyard mountain, 482 m in height. The range of hills in the south of Weimar rises up to 370 m and is part of the Ilm Saale Plate Muschelkalk formation. The eastern, central and western parts of the municipal territory are in agricultural use, whereas the Ettersberg and some southern areas are wooded.

=== Climate ===
Weimar has a humid continental climate (Dfb) or an oceanic climate (Cfb) according to the Köppen climate classification system. Summers are warm and sometimes humid with average high temperatures of 23 °C (73 °F) and lows of 12 °C (54 °F). Winters are relatively cold with average high temperatures of 2 °C (36 °F) and lows of −3 °C (27 °F). The city's topography creates a microclimate caused through the basin position with sometimes inversion in winter (quite cold nights under −20 °C (−4 °F)). Annual precipitation is only 535 mm (21.1 in) with moderate rainfall throughout the year. Light snowfall occurs, mainly from December through February, but snow cover does not usually remain for long.

The Weimar (Erfurt–Weimar Airport) weather station has recorded the following extreme values:

- Its highest temperature was 37.6 °C (99.7 °F) on 20 July 2022.
- Its lowest temperature was −25.0 °C (−13.0 °F) on 11 January 1982.
- Its greatest annual precipitation was 766.9 mm (30.19 in) in 2002.
- Its least annual precipitation was 295.6 mm (11.64 in) in 1982.
- The longest annual sunshine was 2,039.4 hours in 2022.
- The shortest annual sunshine was 1,341 hours in 1977.

Climate data for Erfurt–Weimar Airport, 1991–2020 normals, extremes 1951–present
Month	Jan	Feb	Mar	Apr	May	Jun	Jul	Aug	Sep	Oct	Nov	Dec	Year
Record high °C (°F)	15.8 (60.4)	19.0 (66.2)	24.2 (75.6)	29.6 (85.3)	31.4 (88.5)	37.9 (100.2)	37.6 (99.7)	36.3 (97.3)	32.2 (90.0)	26.6 (79.9)	20.8 (69.4)	17.4 (63.3)	37.9 (100.2)
Mean maximum °C (°F)	10.5 (50.9)	12.3 (54.1)	17.3 (63.1)	22.6 (72.7)	26.5 (79.7)	29.8 (85.6)	31.5 (88.7)	31.5 (88.7)	26.2 (79.2)	21.2 (70.2)	14.9 (58.8)	11.4 (52.5)	33.4 (92.1)
Mean daily maximum °C (°F)	2.7 (36.9)	4.1 (39.4)	8.4 (47.1)	13.8 (56.8)	17.7 (63.9)	21.1 (70.0)	23.6 (74.5)	23.6 (74.5)	18.7 (65.7)	13.1 (55.6)	7.2 (45.0)	3.6 (38.5)	13.1 (55.6)
Daily mean °C (°F)	0.2 (32.4)	0.9 (33.6)	4.3 (39.7)	8.8 (47.8)	12.9 (55.2)	16.1 (61.0)	18.3 (64.9)	18.1 (64.6)	13.8 (56.8)	9.1 (48.4)	4.4 (39.9)	1.2 (34.2)	9.0 (48.2)
Mean daily minimum °C (°F)	−2.5 (27.5)	−2.3 (27.9)	0.3 (32.5)	3.5 (38.3)	7.4 (45.3)	10.8 (51.4)	12.8 (55.0)	12.7 (54.9)	9.1 (48.4)	5.4 (41.7)	1.6 (34.9)	−1.4 (29.5)	4.8 (40.6)
Mean minimum °C (°F)	−12.4 (9.7)	−10.7 (12.7)	−5.9 (21.4)	−3.2 (26.2)	1.0 (33.8)	5.1 (41.2)	7.8 (46.0)	6.8 (44.2)	3.1 (37.6)	−1.4 (29.5)	−5.4 (22.3)	−10.1 (13.8)	−14.8 (5.4)
Record low °C (°F)	−25.0 (−13.0)	−24.6 (−12.3)	−20.2 (−4.4)	−10.4 (13.3)	−2.9 (26.8)	0.0 (32.0)	3.3 (37.9)	3.7 (38.7)	−0.6 (30.9)	−7.6 (18.3)	−18.6 (−1.5)	−23.5 (−10.3)	−25.0 (−13.0)
Average precipitation mm (inches)	25.0 (0.98)	22.9 (0.90)	36.3 (1.43)	34.2 (1.35)	63.9 (2.52)	55.7 (2.19)	80.8 (3.18)	58.7 (2.31)	45.8 (1.80)	37.6 (1.48)	41.1 (1.62)	32.6 (1.28)	534.7 (21.05)
Average extreme snow depth cm (inches)	7.4 (2.9)	6.6 (2.6)	4.3 (1.7)	0.8 (0.3)	0 (0)	0 (0)	0 (0)	0 (0)	0 (0)	0.4 (0.2)	1.7 (0.7)	6.7 (2.6)	13.1 (5.2)
Average precipitation days (≥ 0.1 mm)	15.0	13.1	14.8	11.8	13.8	13.2	14.9	13.0	12.0	13.9	14.3	15.3	165.0
Average snowy days (≥ 1.0 cm)	11.7	9.5	4.3	0.3	0	0	0	0	0	0.2	2.0	7.3	35.4
Average relative humidity (%)	85.7	82.4	77.7	70.7	72.1	72.4	70.1	69.2	76.2	82.8	87.0	87.2	77.8
Mean monthly sunshine hours	59.7	80.6	128.7	184.8	211.9	219.8	224.7	210.4	159.3	112.4	60.7	47.0	1,706.5
Source 1: NOAA
Source 2: Deutscher Wetterdienst / SKlima.de

=== Administrative division ===
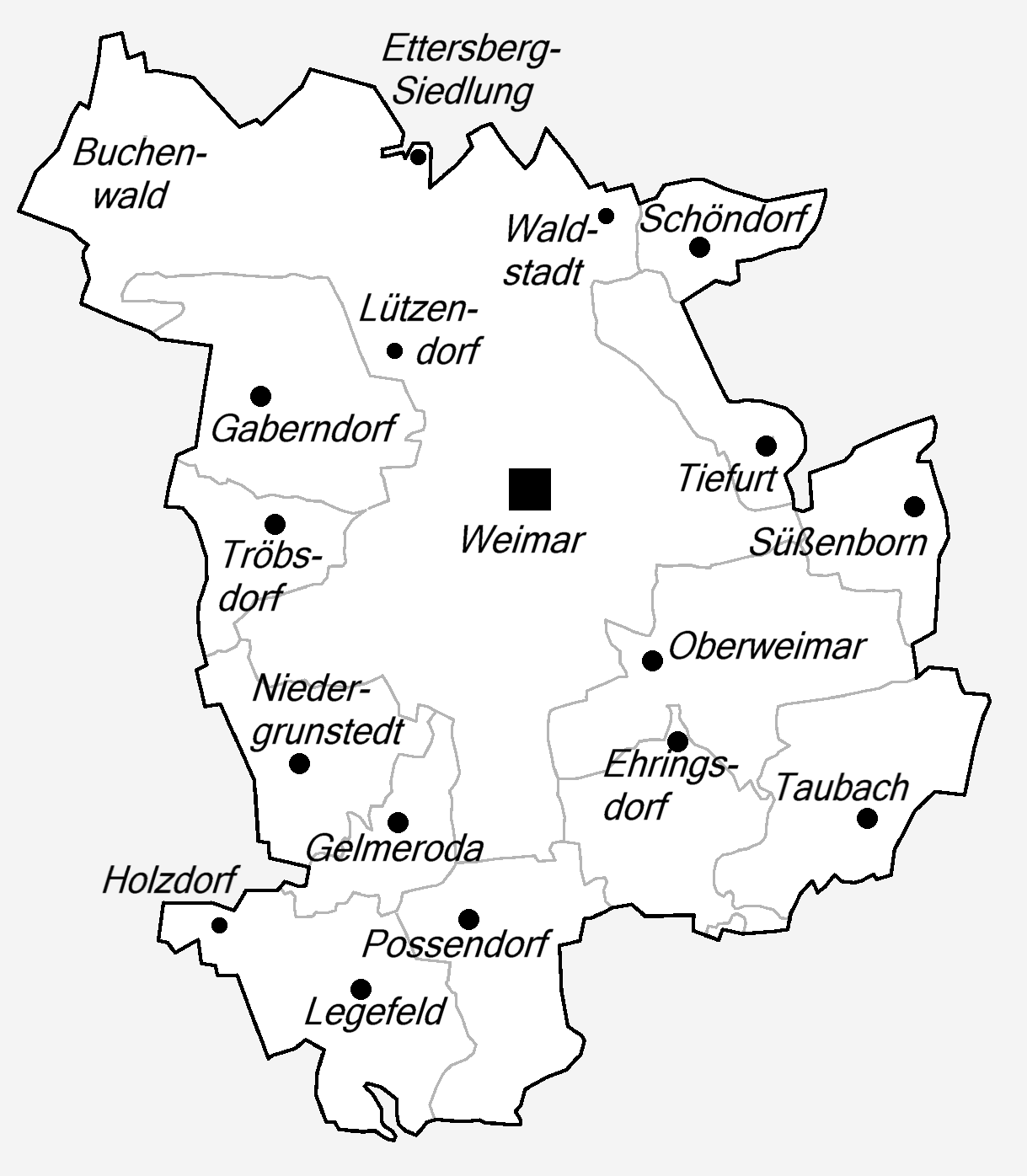
Districts of Weimar

Weimar abuts the district of Weimarer Land with the municipalities Berlstedt, Ettersburg, Kleinobringen, Großobringen and Wohlsborn in the north, Kromsdorf, Umpferstedt and Mellingen in the east, Vollersroda, Buchfart, Hetschburg, Bad Berka and Troistedt in the south and Nohra, Daasdorf am Berge, Hopfgarten and Ottstedt am Berge in the west.

The city itself is divided into 10 inner urban and 11 suburban districts. The centre is formed by the district Altstadt (old town) and the Gründerzeit districts Nordvorstadt in the north, Parkvorstadt in the east and Westvorstadt in the south and west. Later additions are Südstadt in the south and Schönblick in the southwest. Finally, there are the Plattenbau settlements, constructed during the GDR period, Weststadt and Nordstadt as well as two industrial areas in the north and west.

The 11 suburban districts are villages which became incorporated during the 20th century; however, they have mostly stayed rural to date:

- Gaberndorf (incorporated in 1994)
- Gelmeroda (1994)
- Legefeld/Holzdorf (1994)
- Niedergrunstedt (1994)
- Oberweimar/Ehringsdorf (1922)
- Possendorf (1994)
- Schöndorf (1939)
- Süßenborn (1994)
- Taubach (1994)
- Tiefurt (1922)
- Tröbsdorf (1994)

=== Demographics ===
History of population until 2010

Over the centuries, Weimar remained a small town of less than 5,000 inhabitants. When it became the capital of Saxe-Weimar in 1572, population growth was stimulated and the population increased from 3,000 in 1650 to 6,000 in 1750. Around the year 1800, Weimar had 7,000 inhabitants. Their number grew constantly over the years to 13,000 in 1850, 28,000 in 1900 and 35,000 at the beginning of World War I. During the interwar period, the new capital of Thuringia saw a population boom, which led to 65,000 inhabitants in 1940. Since that time, the population levels have stagnated. The years 2009 to 2012 brought a moderate growth of approximately 0.35% per year, whereas the population in bordering rural regions is shrinking with accelerating tendency. Suburbanization played only a small role in Weimar. It occurred after the reunification for a short time in the 1990s, but most of the suburban areas were situated within the administrative city borders.

The birth surplus was +3 in 2012, this is +0.0 per 1,000 inhabitants (Thuringian average: −4.5; national average: −2.4). The net migration rate was +4.5 per 1,000 inhabitants in 2012 (Thuringian average: -0.8; national average: +4.6). The most important regions of origin are rural areas of Thuringia, Saxony-Anhalt and Saxony as well as foreign countries like Poland, Russia, Ukraine, Hungary, Serbia, Romania and Bulgaria.

Like other eastern German cities, Weimar has a relatively small foreign population (compared to the German average): circa 4.0% are non-Germans by citizenship, while 7.9% have a migrant background (according to 2011 EU census). Differing from the national average, the biggest groups of migrants in Weimar are Vietnamese people, Russians and Ukrainians. During recent years, the economic situation of the city improved: the unemployment rate declined from 20% in 2005 to 5.1% in 2019. Due to the official atheism in the former GDR, most of the population is non-religious. 21.1% are members of the Evangelical Church in Central Germany and 6.8% are Catholics (according to 2011 EU census).

== Culture, sights and cityscape ==
Classical Weimar
UNESCO World Heritage Site
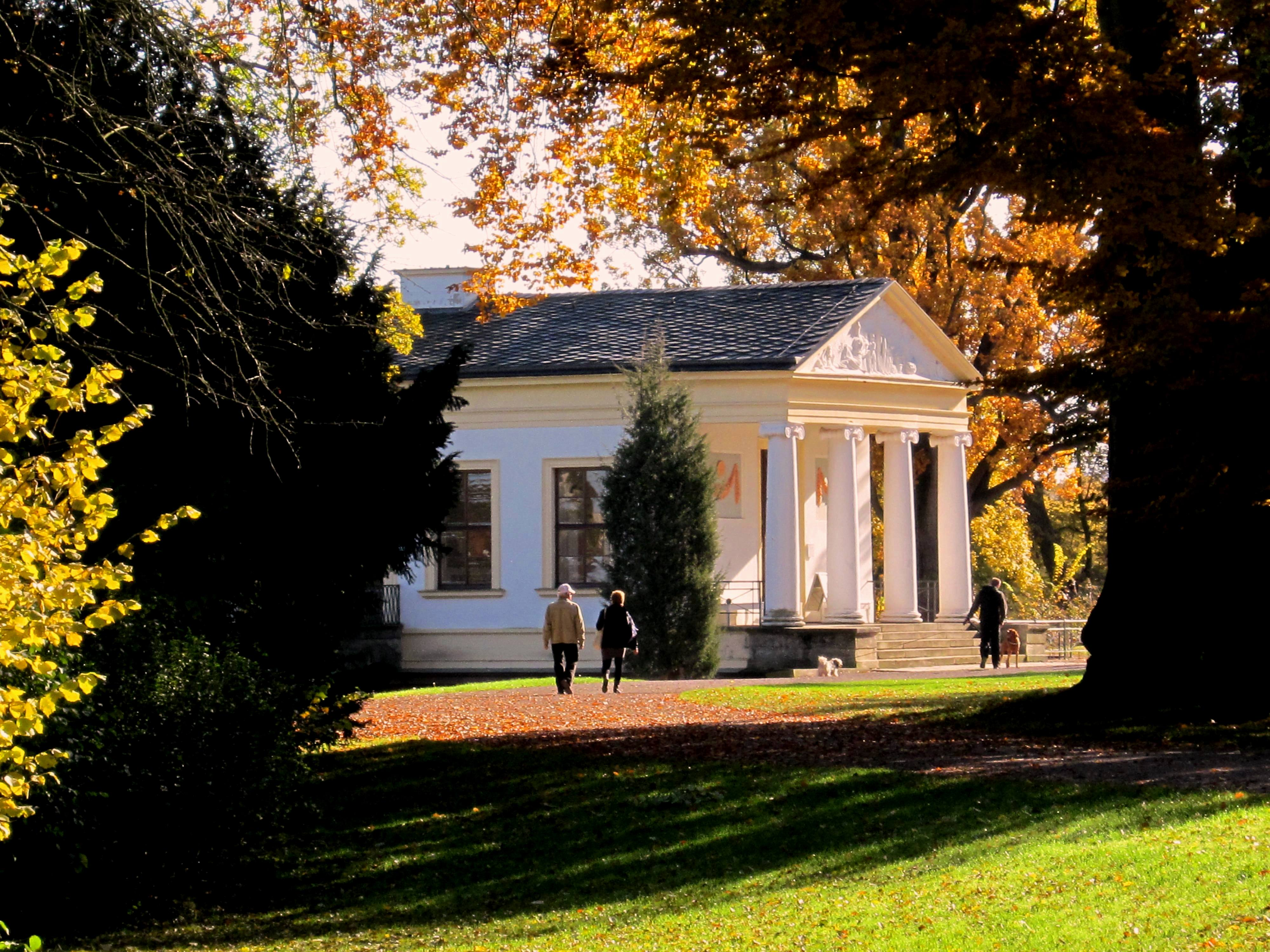
- Park an der Ilm
- Interactive map of Classical Weimar
- Criteria: Cultural: iii, vi
- Reference: 846
- Inscription: 1998 (22nd Session)

=== World Heritage Sites ===
Two World Heritage Sites converge in Weimar:

- The Classical Weimar World Heritage Site consists of 11 sites related to Weimar as a European centre of the Enlightenment during the eighteenth and early nineteenth centuries.
- The Bauhaus and its Sites in Weimar, Dessau and Bernau World Heritage Site comprises six separate sites, two in Weimar, which are associated with the Bauhaus art school, which had a revolutionary influence on 20th century architectural and aesthetic thinking and practice.

=== Museums ===
Weimar has a great variety of museums:

- The Goethe-Nationalmuseum at Frauenplan shows the life of Johann Wolfgang von Goethe in his former residence.
- Goethe's garden house in the Park an der Ilm shows an exhibition about Goethe and his connection to nature.
- The Schiller-Museum at Schillerstraße shows the life of Friedrich Schiller in his former residence.
- The Goethe- und Schiller-Archiv at Hans-Wahl-Straße collects the estate of Goethe, Schiller and other various artists. In 2001, it became a member of the UNESCO Memory of the World Programme.
- The Wittumspalais at Theaterplatz shows early-modern court lifestyle with items like furniture and porcelain.
- The Liszt-Haus at Marienstraße shows the life of Franz Liszt in his former summer residence.
- The Nietzsche-Archiv at Humboldtstraße shows the life and estate of Friedrich Nietzsche.
- The Gedenkstätte Buchenwald in former Buchenwald concentration camp commemorates the victims of Nazi terror.
- The Bauhaus-Museum at Theaterplatz shows an exhibition about the Bauhaus design school.
- The Schlossmuseum inside the residence castle exhibits early-modern antiques and other objects of court life.
- The Duchess Anna Amalia Library at Platz der Demokratie is an important early-modern library with various print objects.
- The Neues Museum at Weimarplatz shows an exhibition of contemporary art.
- The Stadtmuseum at Karl-Liebknecht-Straße exhibits the municipal history of Weimar.
- The Kunsthalle Harry Graf Kessler at Goetheplatz hosts rotating exhibitions of contemporary artists.
- The Haus am Horn at Am Horn street was the first building designed entirely on the design principles of the Bauhaus art school.
- The Fürstengruft at the historic cemetery is a mausoleum of famous Weimar citizens like Goethe and Schiller as well as the dukes of Saxe-Weimar.
- The Museum für Ur- und Frühgeschichte Thüringens (museum of pre- and protohistory of Thuringia) at Humboldtstraße exhibits various objects of early Thuringian history such as archaeological finds.
- The Deutsches Bienenmuseum (German bee museum) at Ilmstraße in Oberweimar district hosts the only pure exhibition about bees and apiculture in Germany.
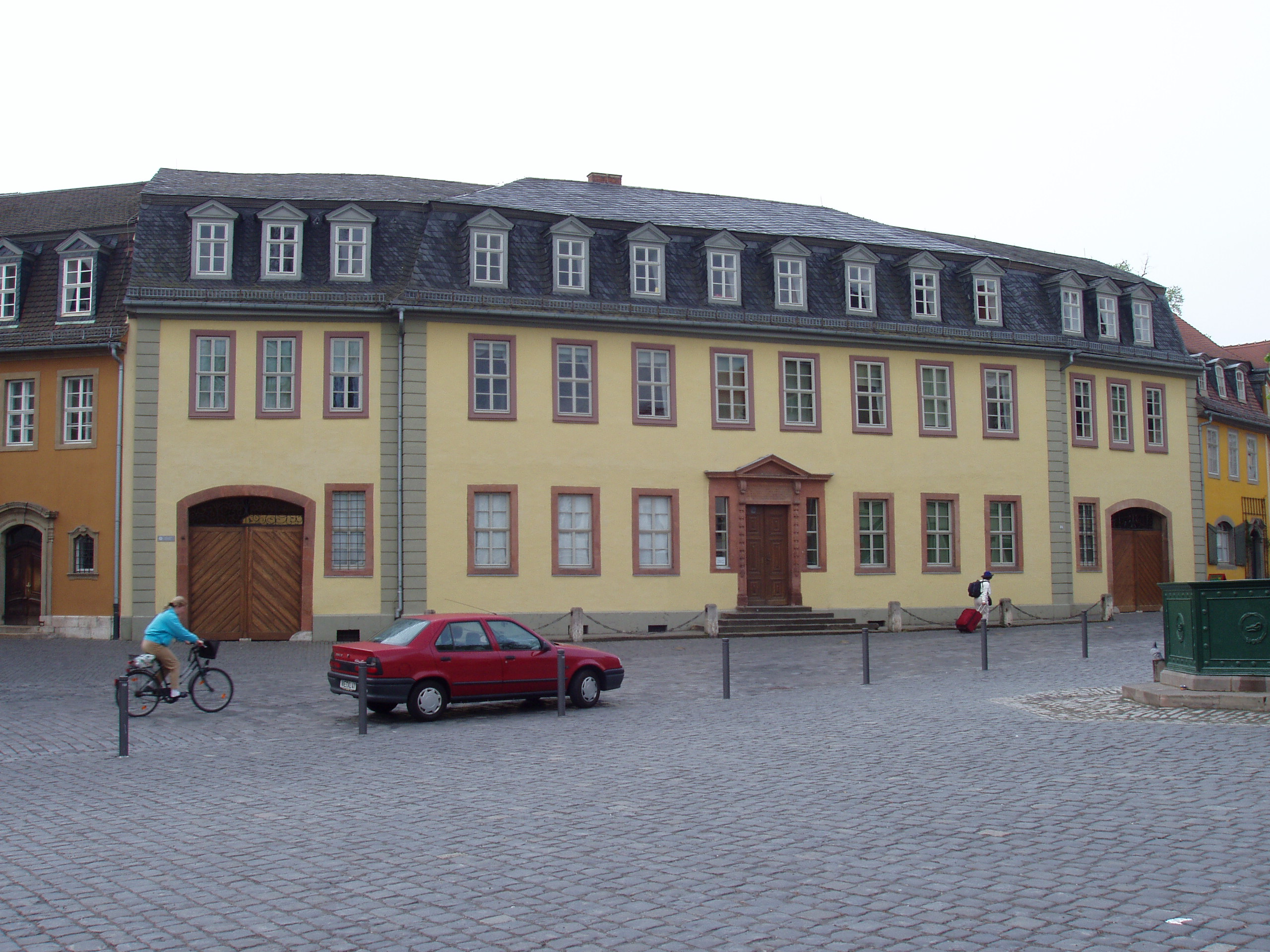
Goethe-Nationalmuseum

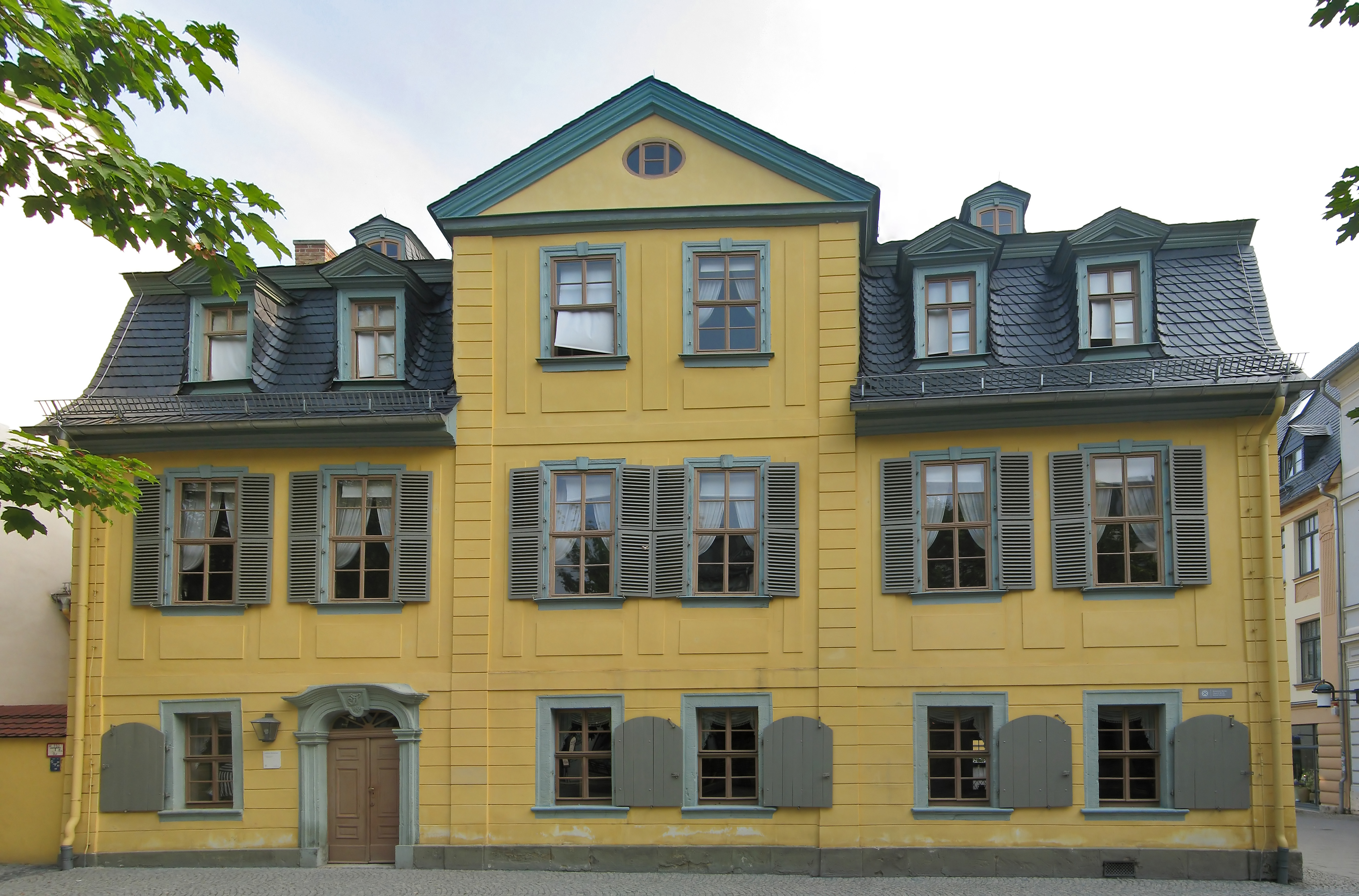
Schiller-Museum

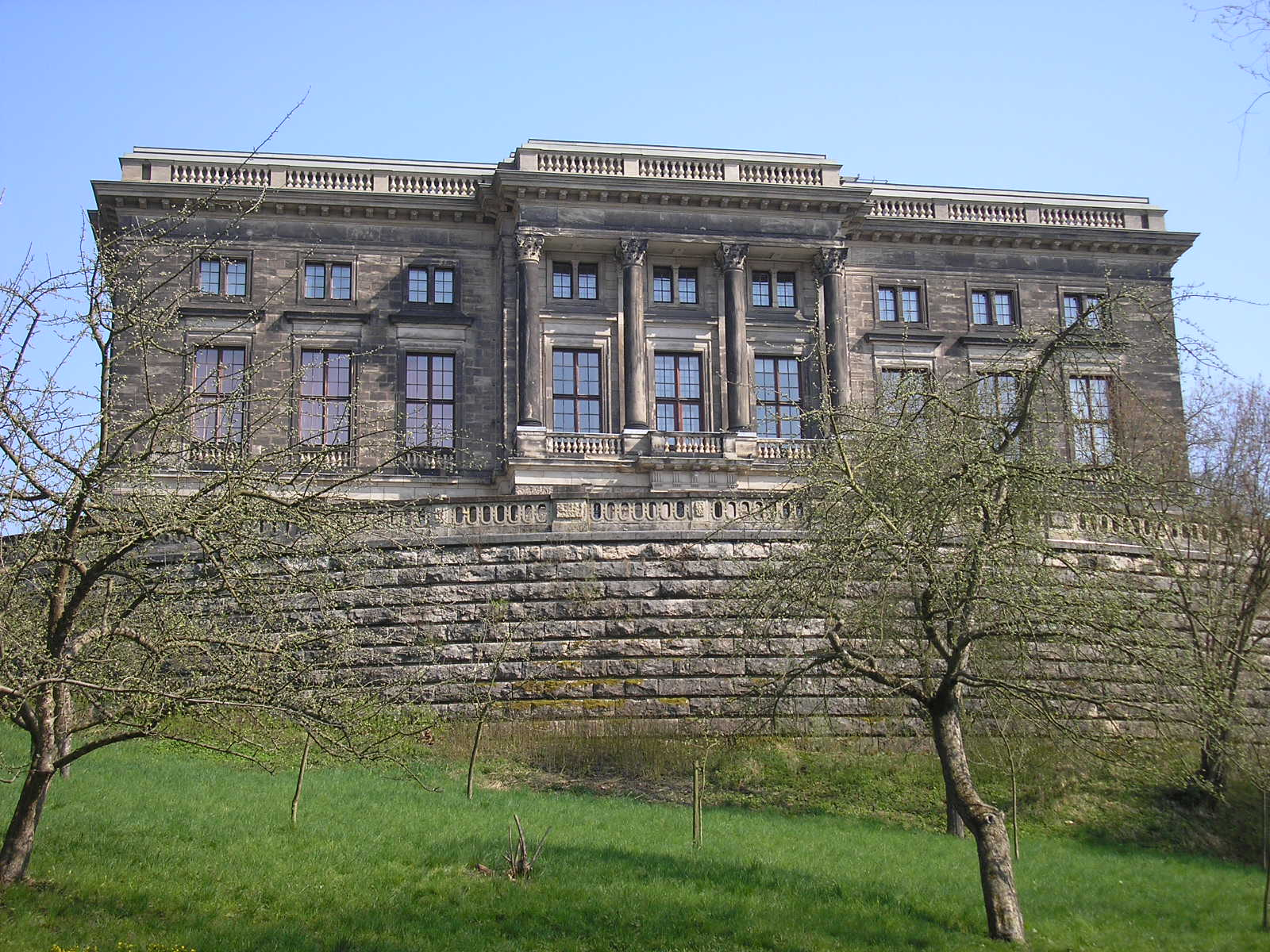
Goethe- und Schiller-Archiv

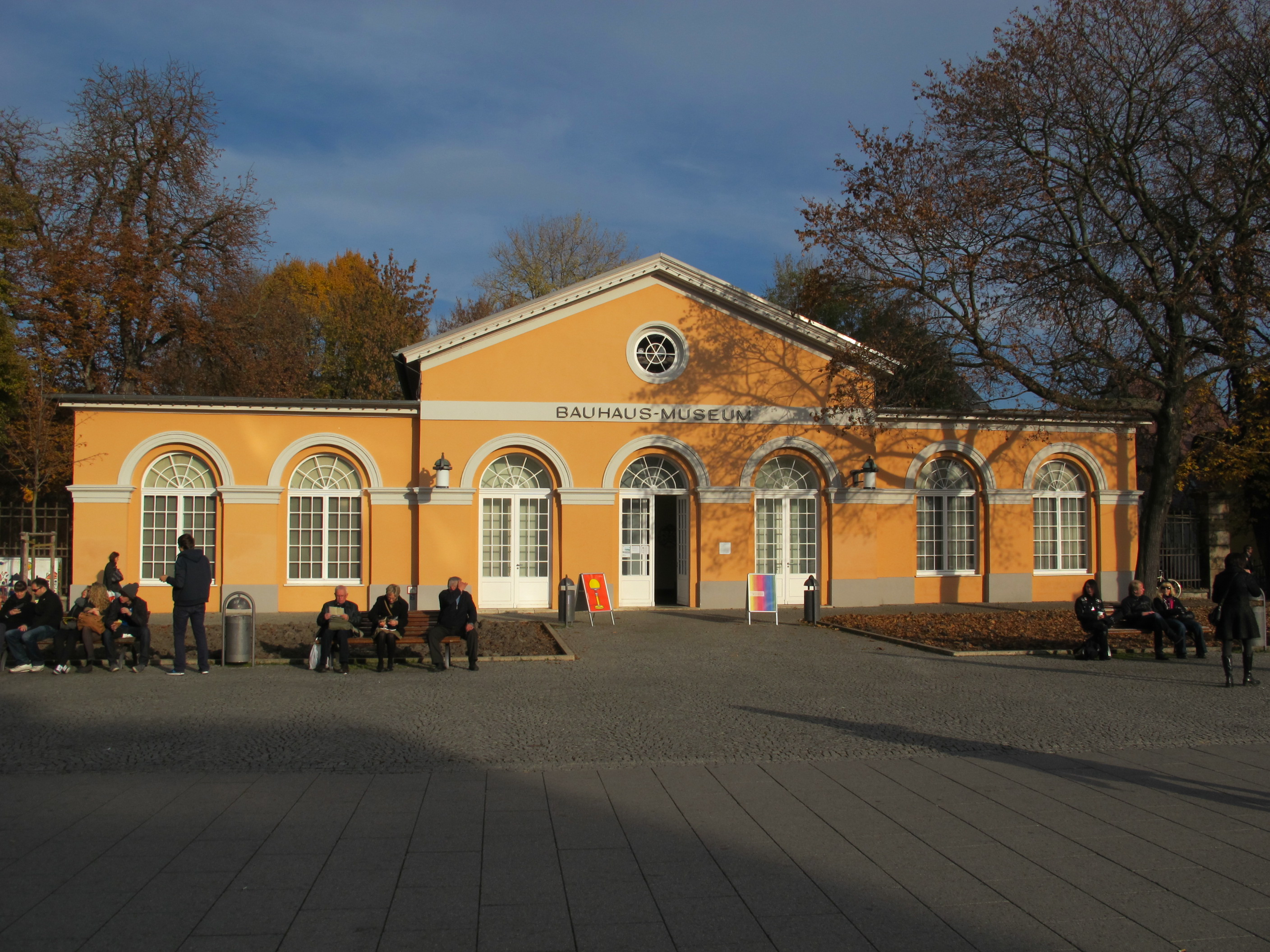
Bauhaus-Museum

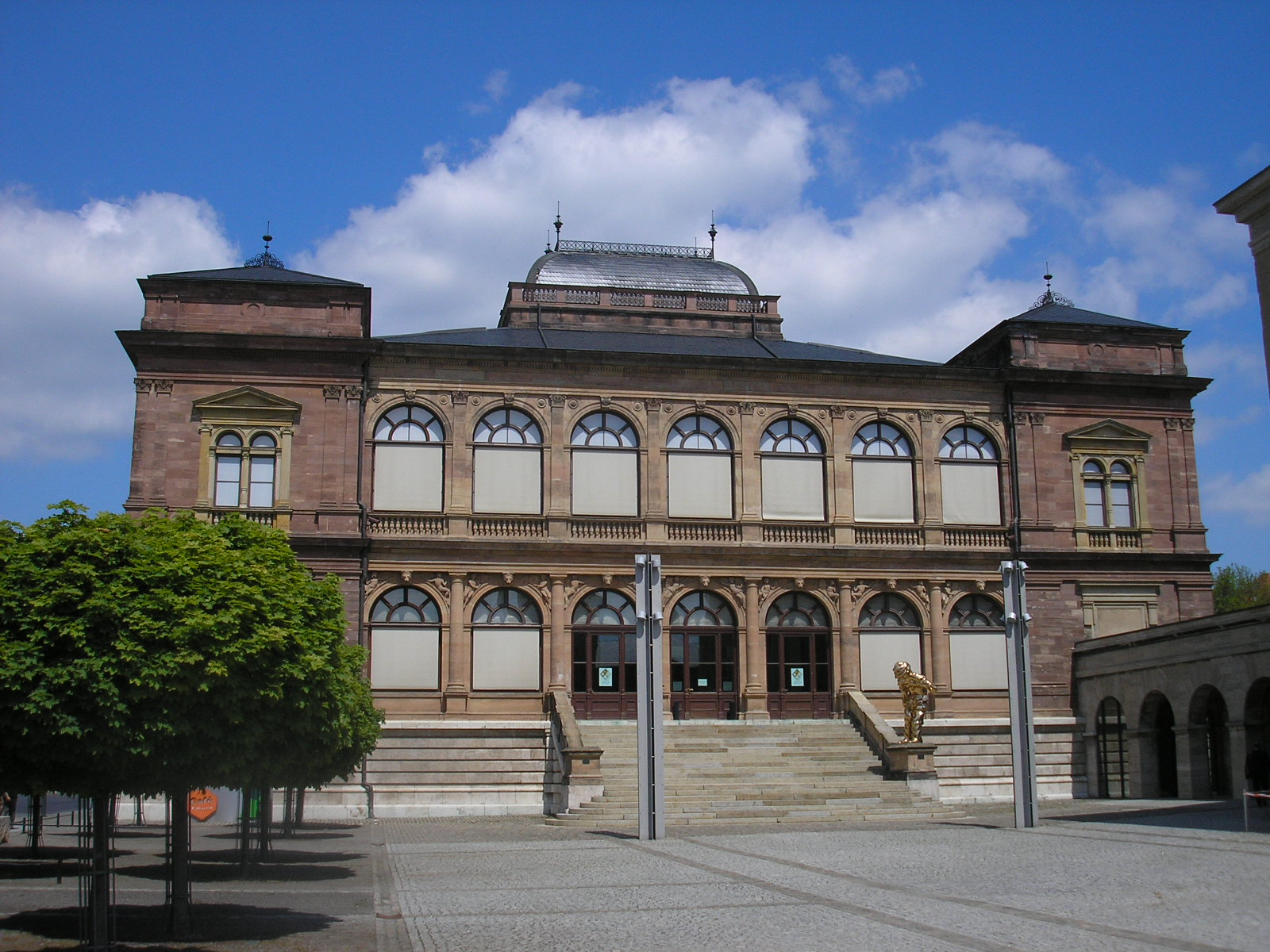
Neues Museum

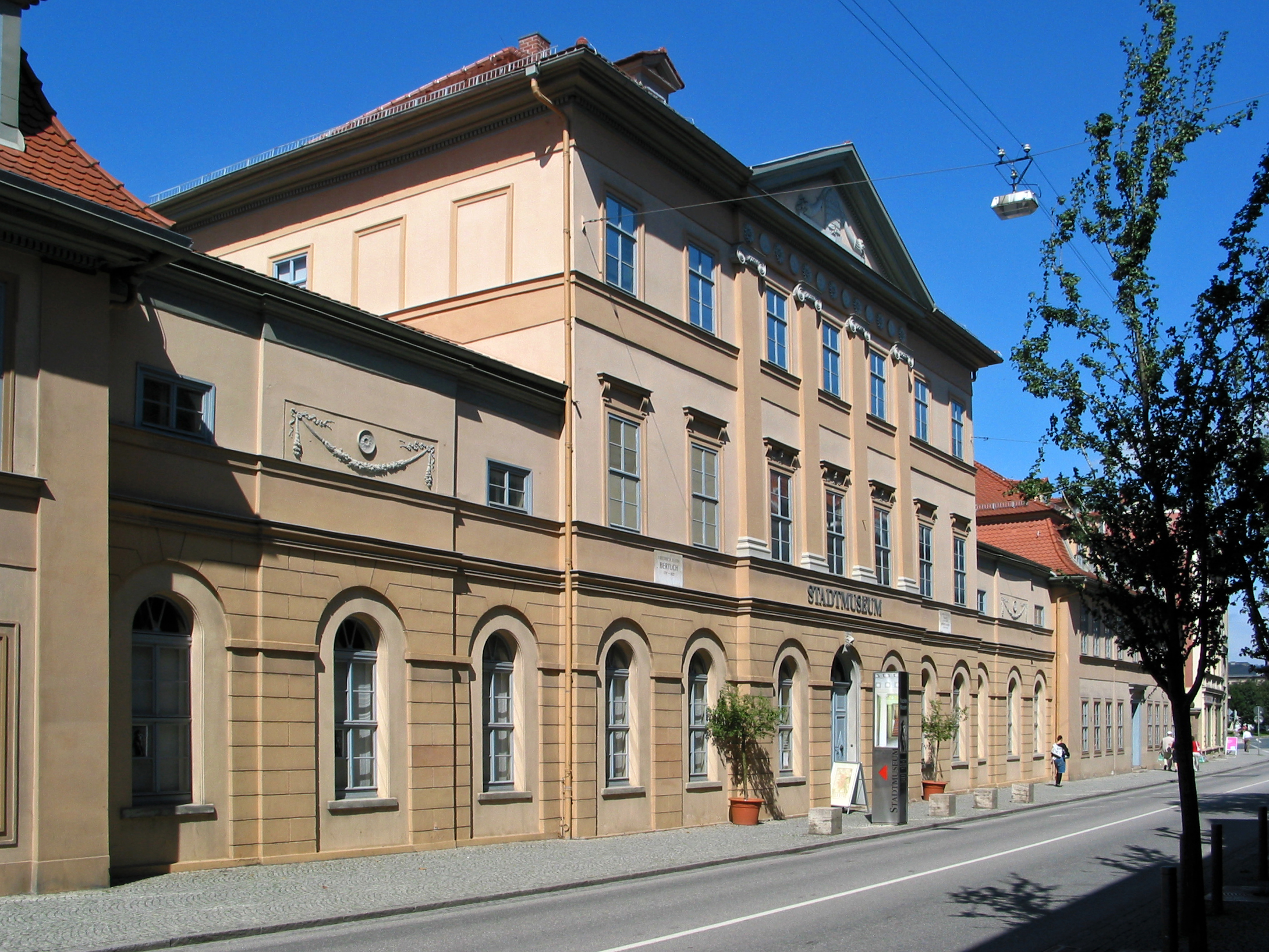
Stadtmuseum

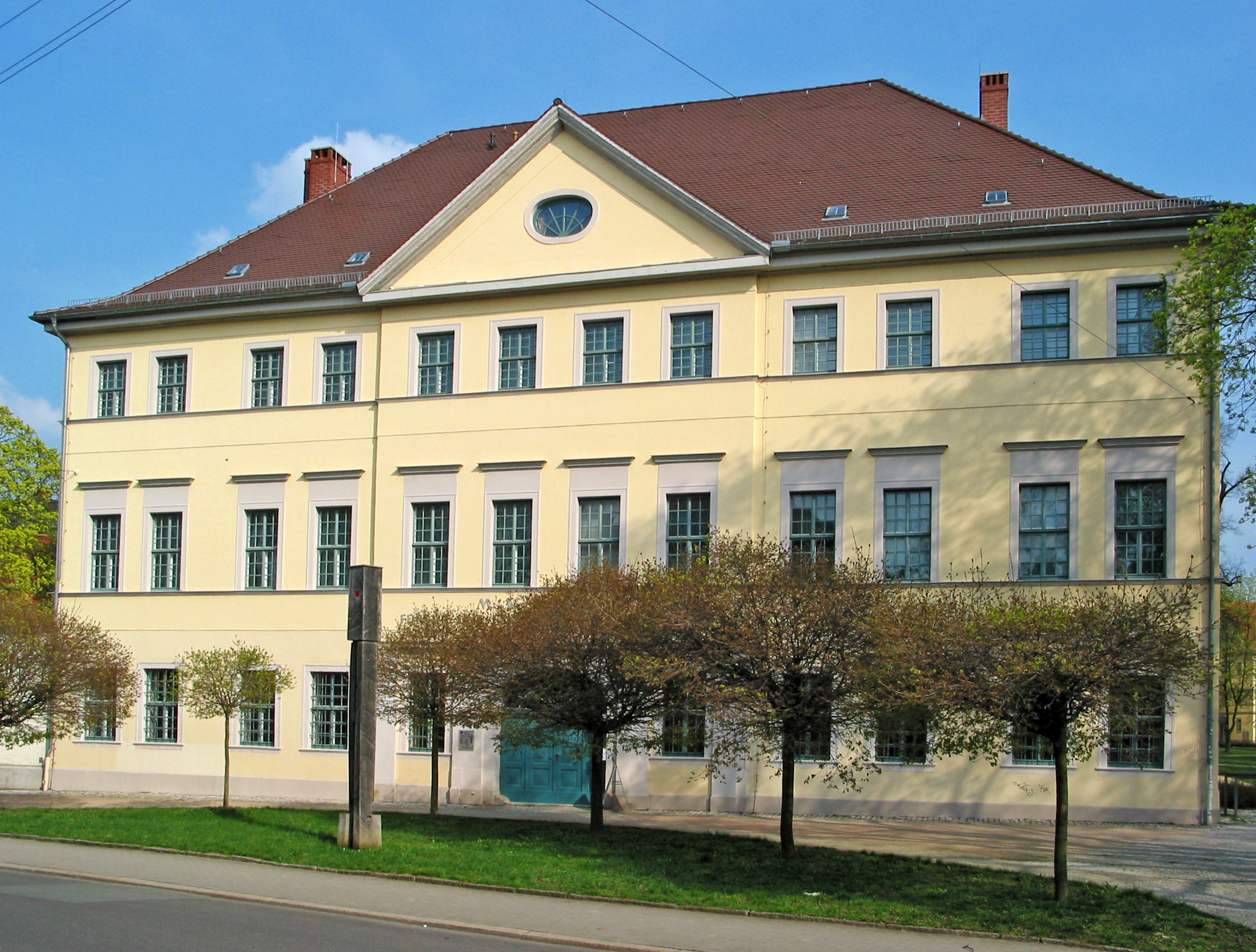
Museum für Ur- und Frühgeschichte Thüringens

=== Cityscape ===
The historic city centre of Weimar is situated between the Ilm river in the east, Grabenstraße in the north, Goetheplatz and Theaterplatz in the west and Schillerstraße in the south. Its two central squares are the Marktplatz in the south (with the town hall) and the Herderplatz in the north (with the main church). Despite its medieval origin, there are only a few medieval buildings, many being destroyed by frequent fires throughout the city's history. Most buildings in this area date back to the 17th and 18th century. Furthermore, Weimar has two old suburbs: in the north, the Jakobsvorstadt around St. James' Church (medieval origin) and another one in the south around Frauenplan square. The majority of buildings in these areas are also of 17th- and 18th-century origin. During the late 19th and early 20th century, Weimar grew in all directions. Because of its function as an "officials' city", the houses in these areas are more substantial than in many comparable Gründerzeit quarters in Germany. The most uptown areas are those right and left of the Park an der Ilm in the southeast, whereas the western and northern quarters are more basic and mixed with industrial areas in their outer parts. During the GDR period, two new Plattenbau settlements were developed in the west and the north of the city. After 1990, suburbanization occurred for a short time and the rural districts of Weimar saw significant growth as part of the larger city.

=== Sights and architectural heritage ===
==== Religious buildings ====
The city's main church is the Evangelical St. Peter and Paul on the Herderplatz (known as Die Herderkirche). It was rebuilt in late Gothic style after a fire around 1500. Between 1726 and 1735, the interior underwent a Baroque remodelling by Johann Adolf Richter. Johann Gottfried Herder was the dean of the church between 1766 and 1803. The second old Evangelical church of Weimar is St. James on Rollplatz, rebuilt in 1712 in Baroque style. The Roman Catholic parish church of Weimar is dedicated to the Sacred Heart and was built between 1888 and 1891 in historicist forms imitating Florence Cathedral. Another church is the Russian Orthodox Chapel within the historic cemetery. It was built in 1862 as the funerary chapel of Grand Duchess Maria Pavlovna and was one of the first Russian-styled buildings in Germany.

Interesting churches in the suburban districts are the Lutheran parish church of Gelmeroda, which was the inspiration for many paintings by Lyonel Feininger, and the Lutheran parish church of Oberweimar, which was a former monastery, and is a good example of Gothic architecture in Weimar.

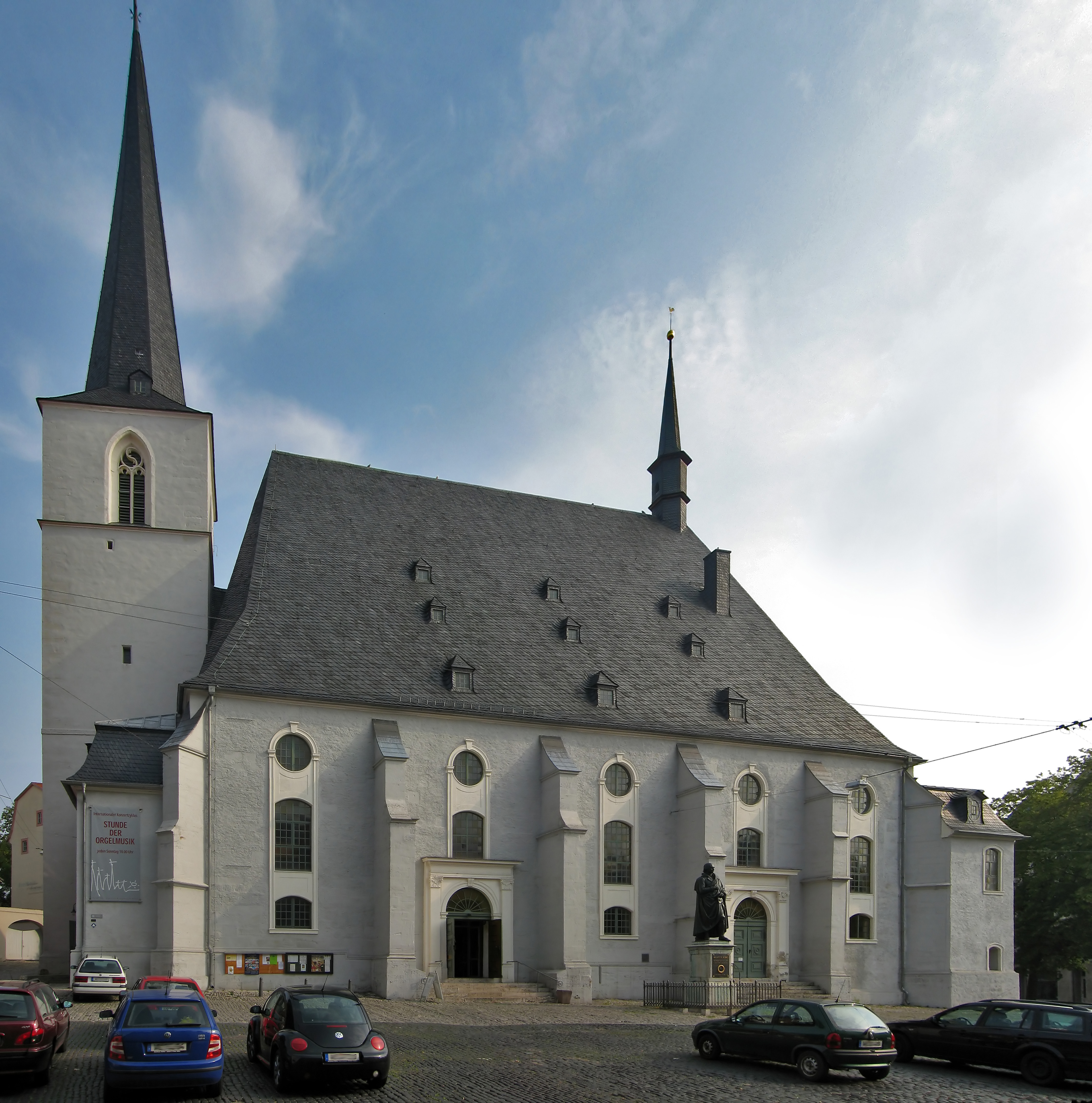
St. Peter and Paul's Church

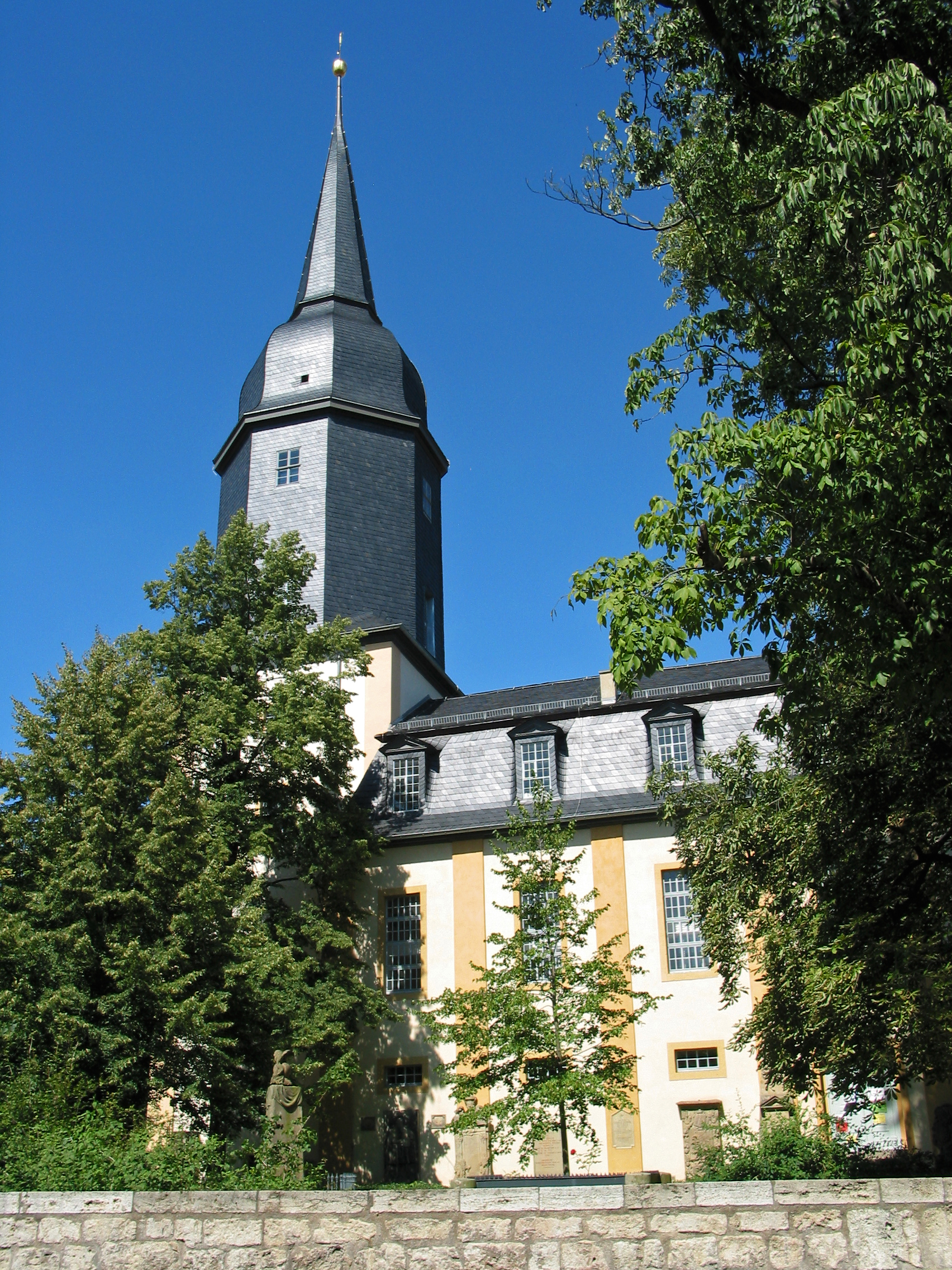
St. James' Church

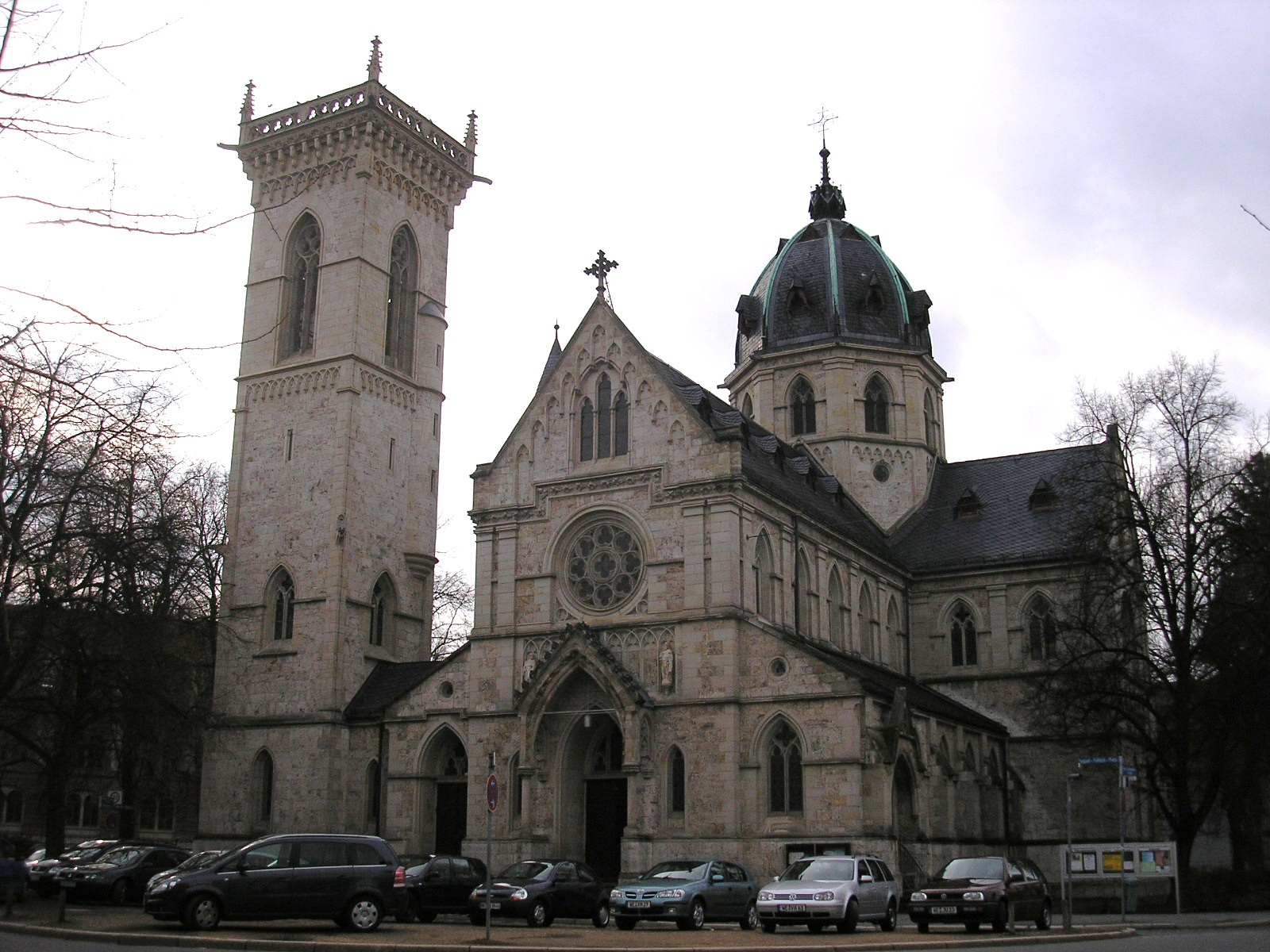
Sacred Heart Church

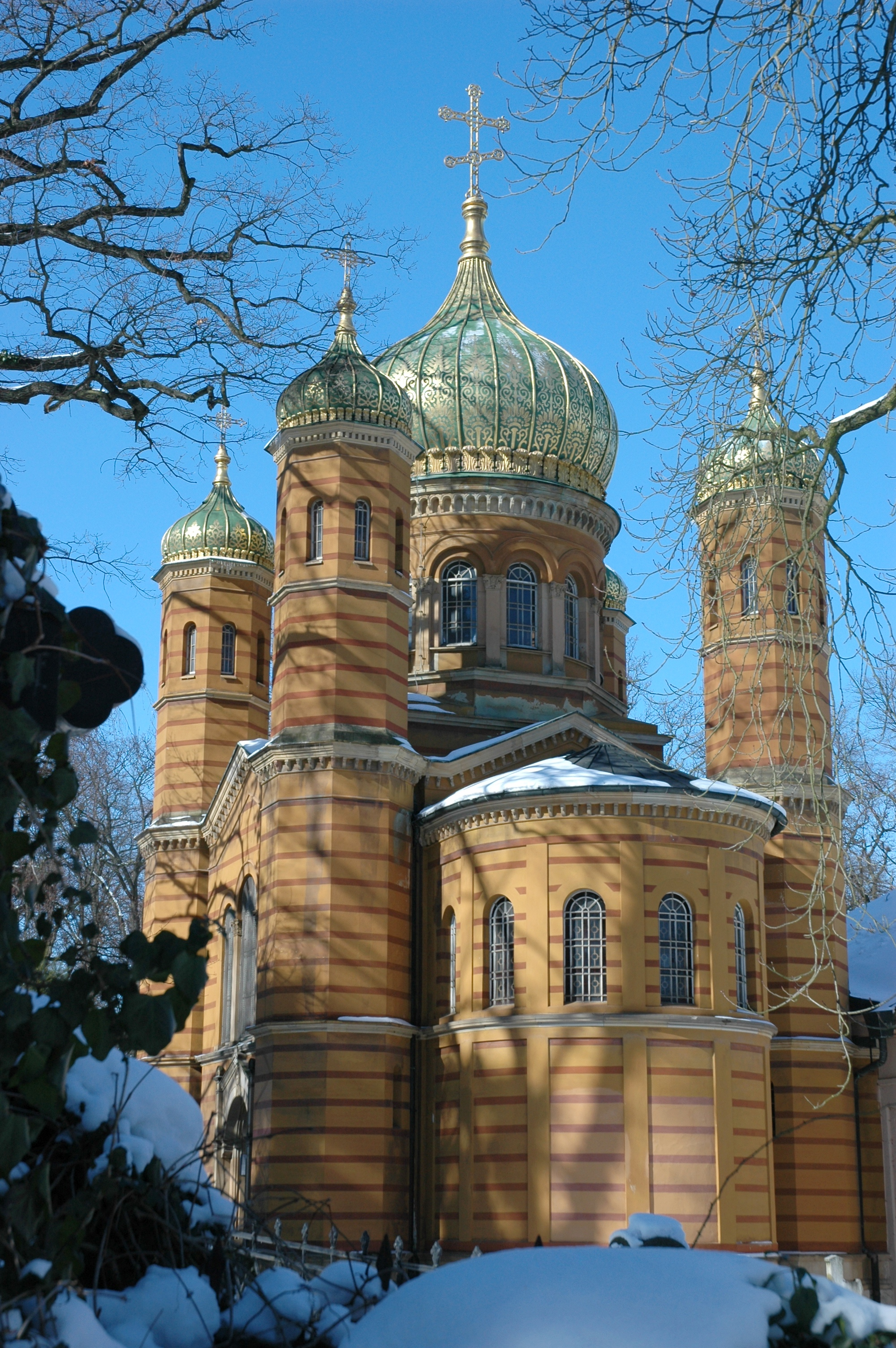
Russian-Orthodox Chapel

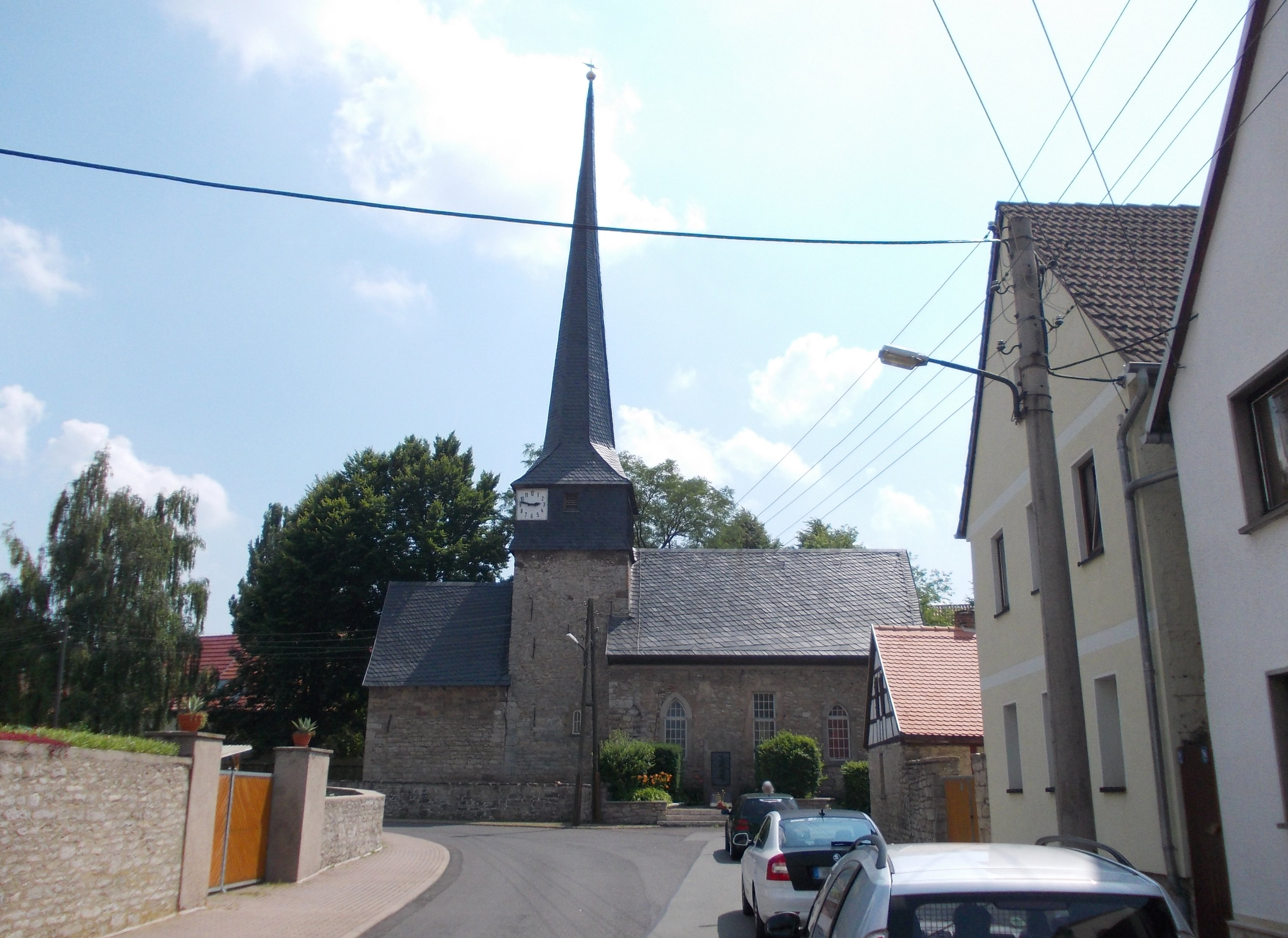
Gelmeroda Parish Church

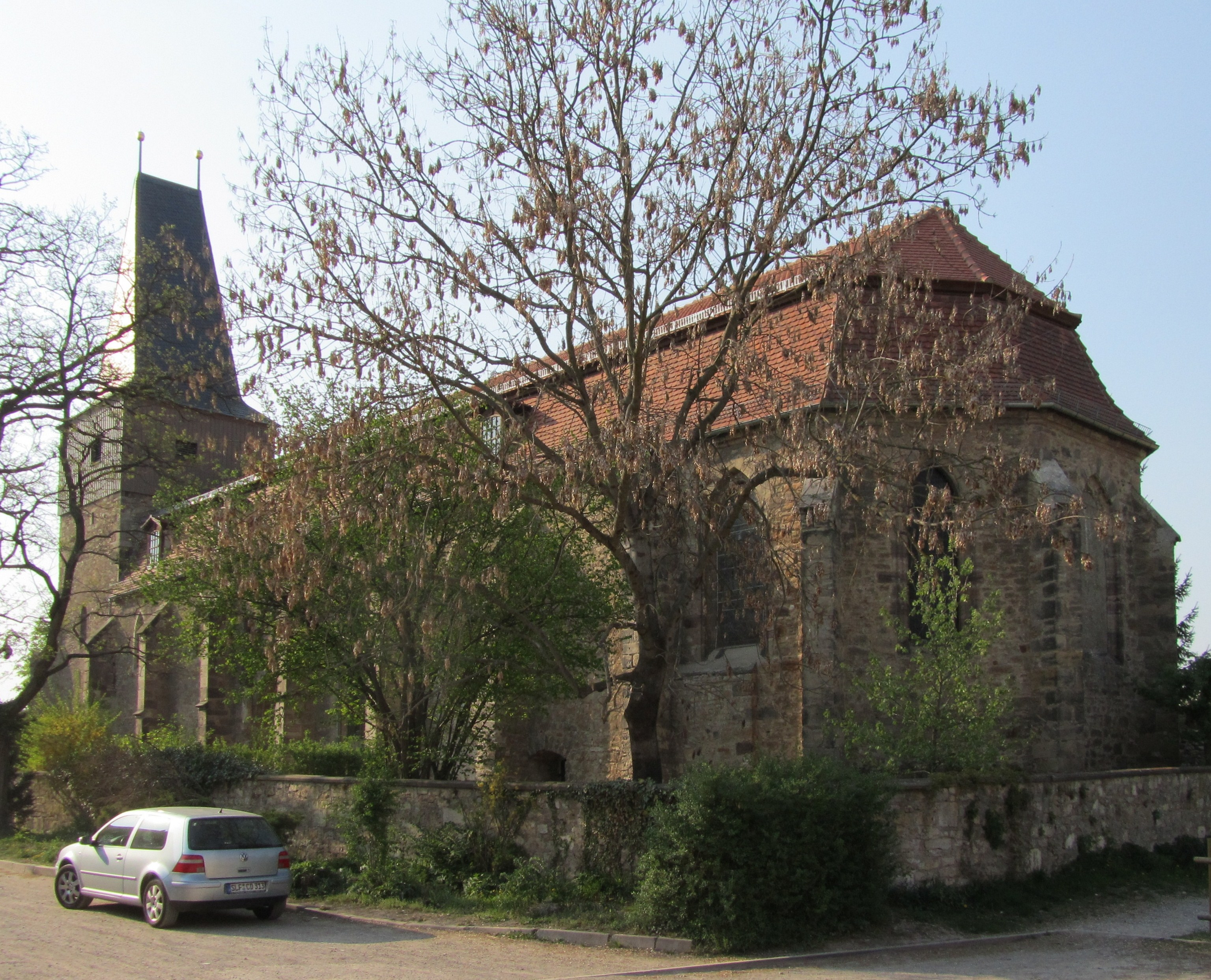
Oberweimar Parish Church

==== Castles and palaces ====
Due to its function as a ducal residence, Weimar is rich in early-modern castles and palaces. The biggest one is the Stadtschloss at Burgplatz in the city centre. Today's four-wing building was started after a great fire in 1774. The tower and the Bastille building at its south-western edge are relics of older castles in this place.

The Fürstenhaus at Platz der Demokratie was the first parliament building in Weimar, established in the 1770s. Today it is in use by the Weimar School of Music. The Green Castle next to the Fürstenhaus was built in the 1560s in Renaissance style and hosts today the Duchess Anna Amalia Library. The Yellow Castle at Grüner Markt was built in 1703 and is the municipal library today. The neighbouring Red Castle is also part of the library and was built in the 1570s. The Wittumspalais is a smaller widow mansion near Theaterplatz, established in 1768. Outbildings of the ducal residence are the Husarenstall (1770), the later residence of Charlotte von Stein at Ackerwand street, the Marstall (1870s) at Kegelplatz, today used as Thuringian State Archive and the Reithaus (1710s) within the Park an der Ilm.

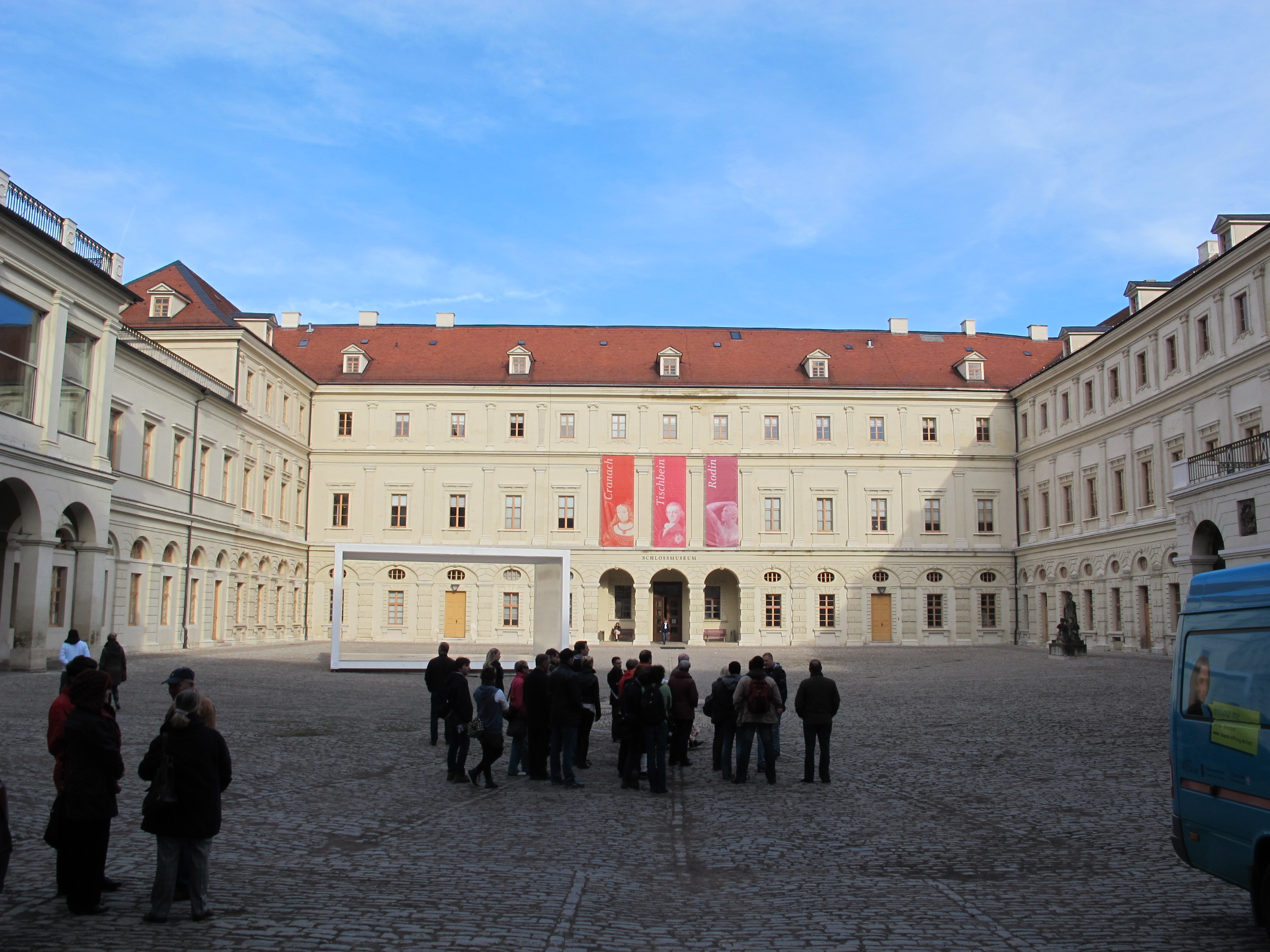
Court of the Stadtschloss

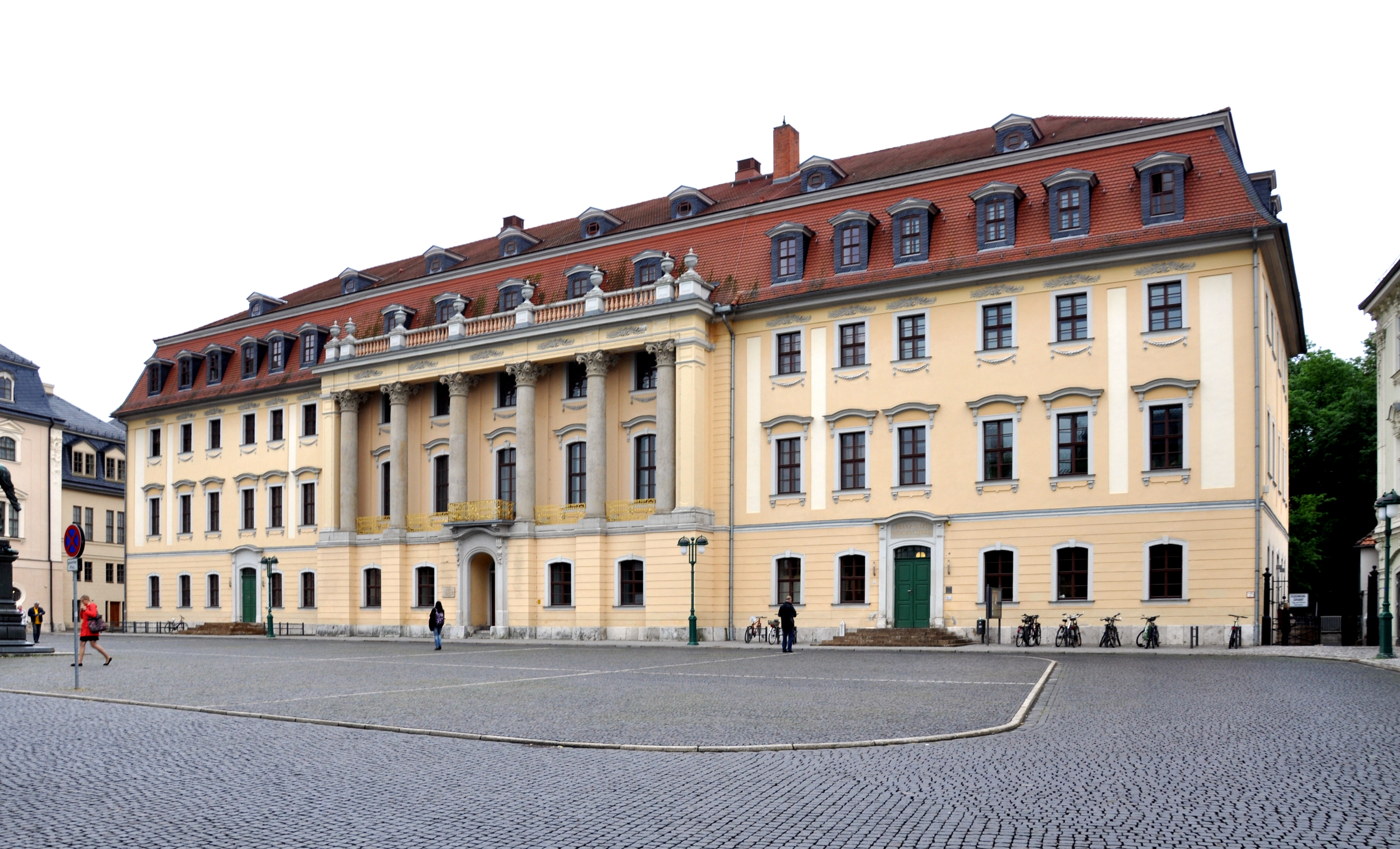
Fürstenhaus

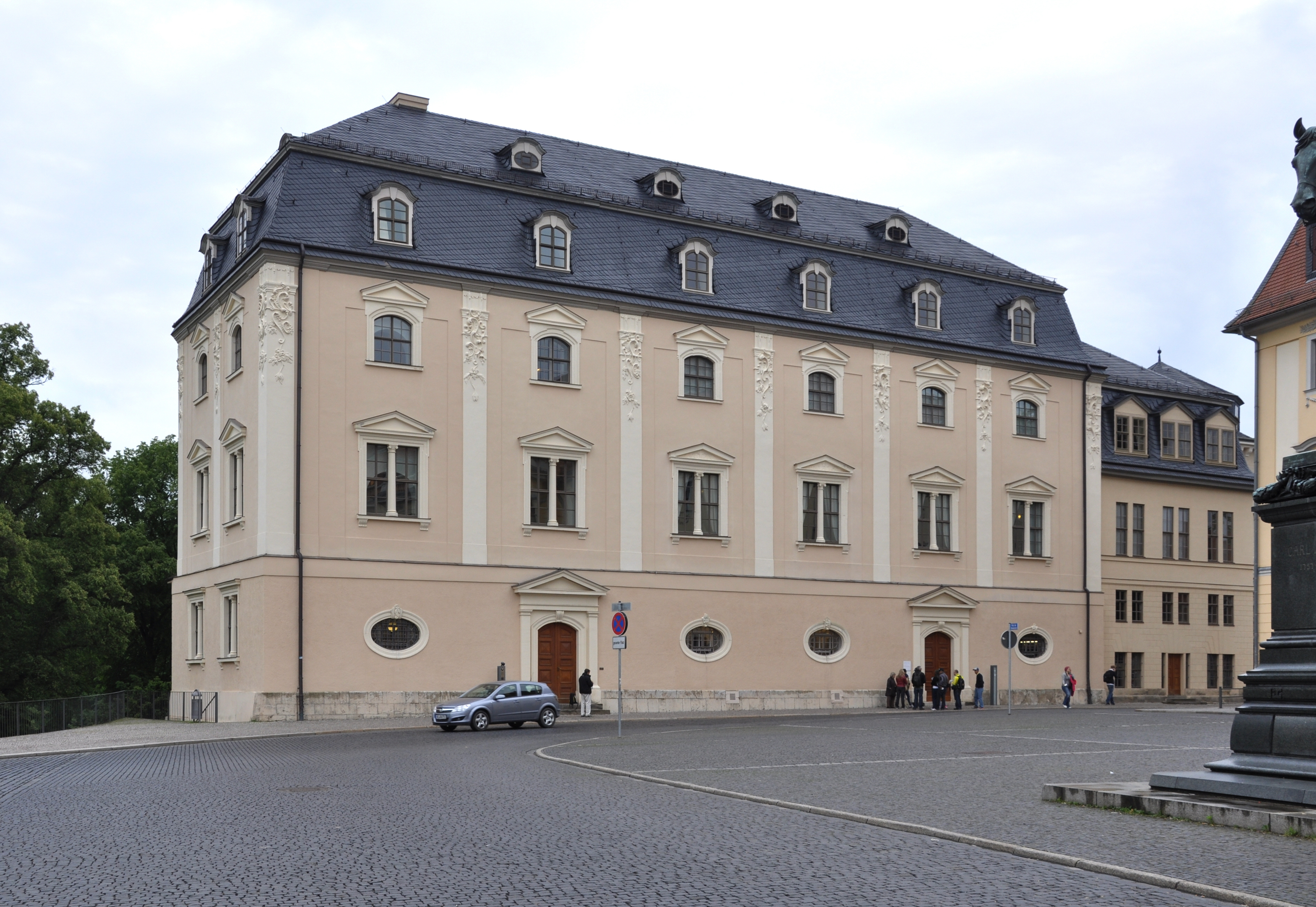
Green Castle

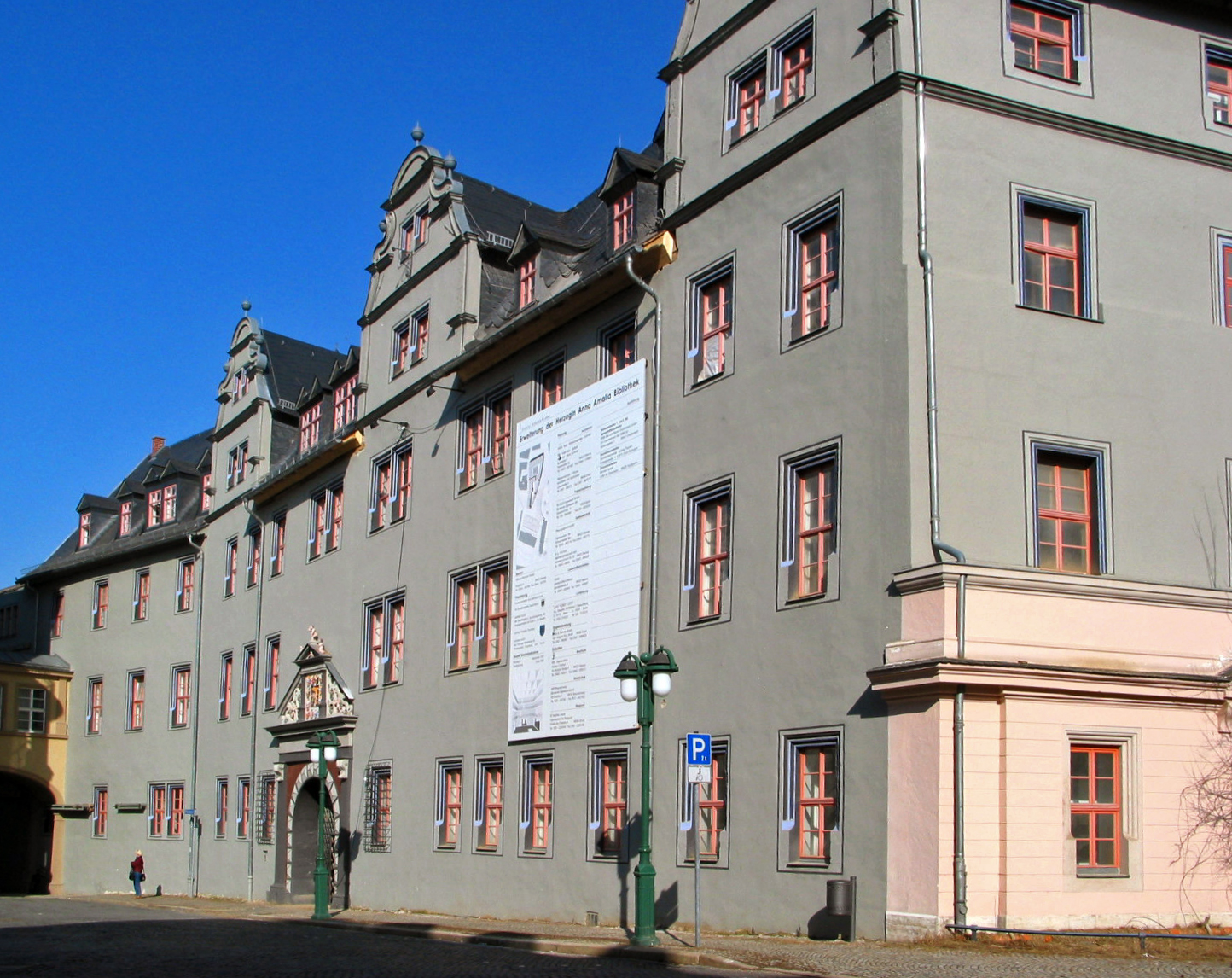
Red Castle

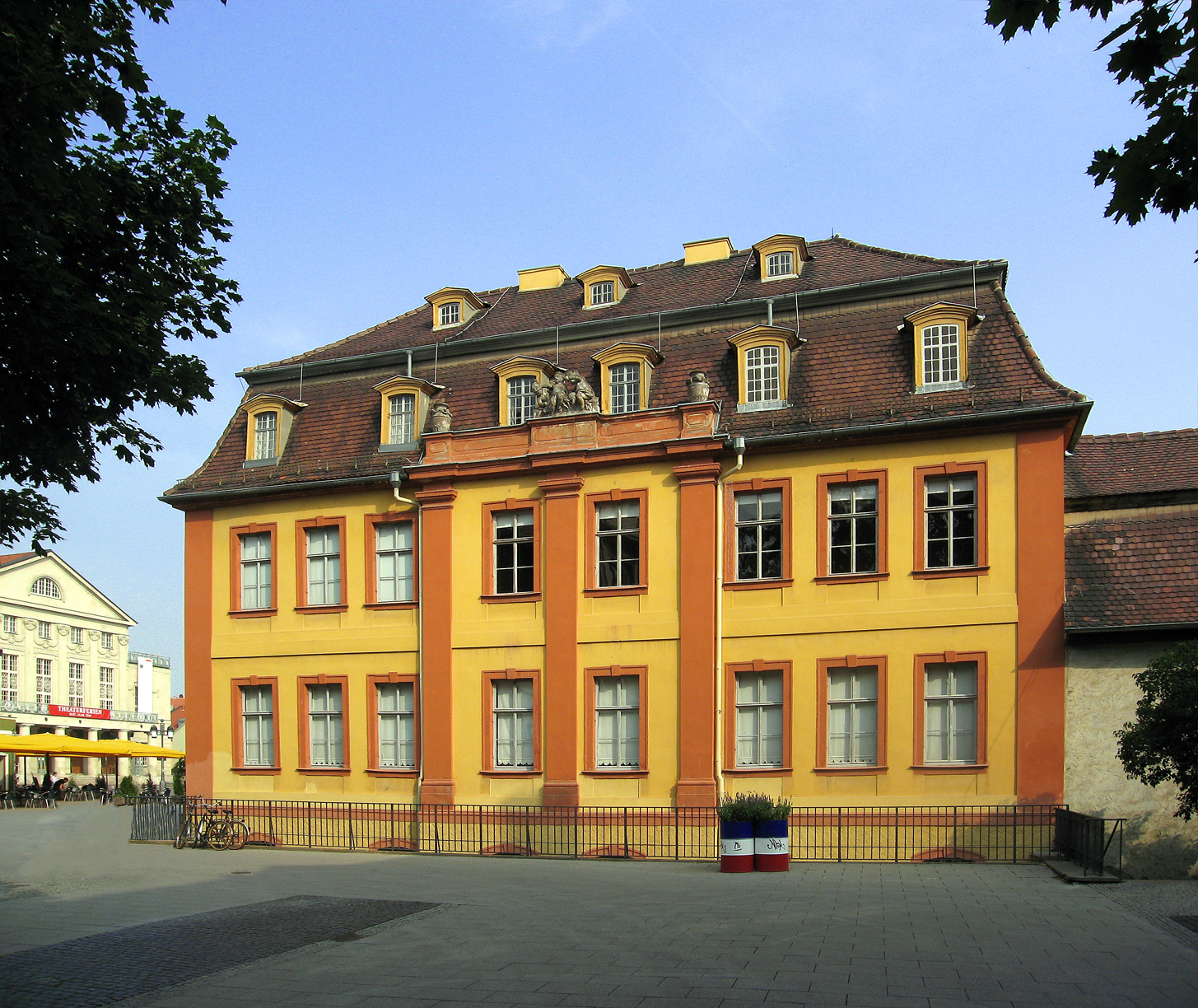
Wittumspalais

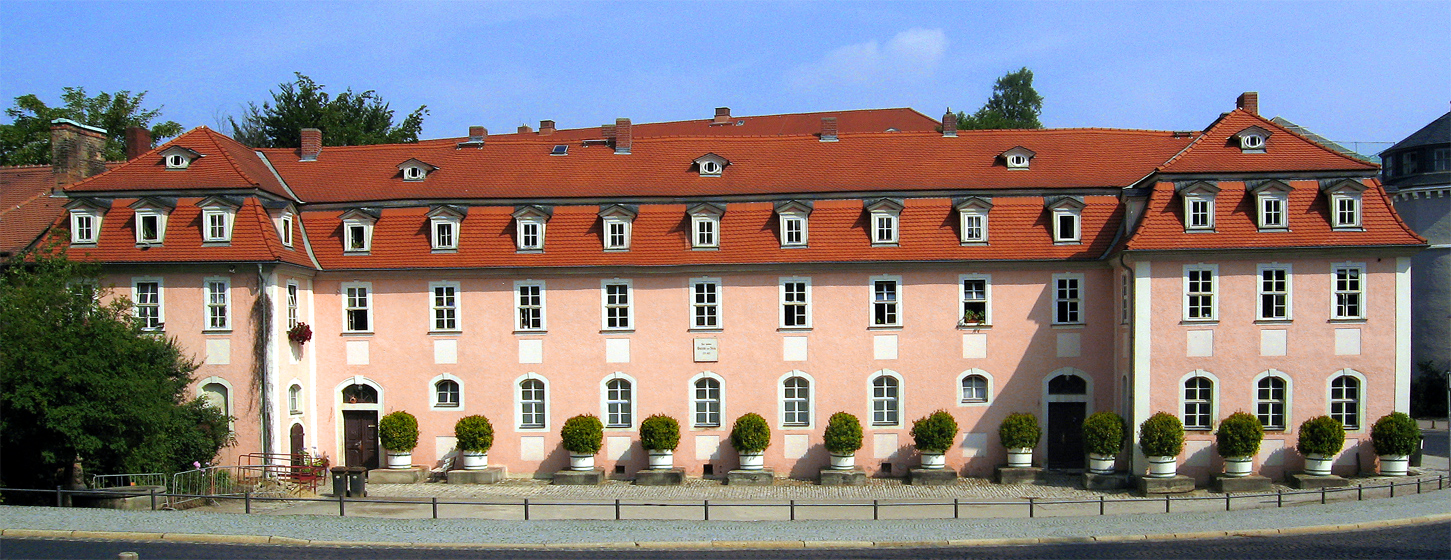
Husarenstall

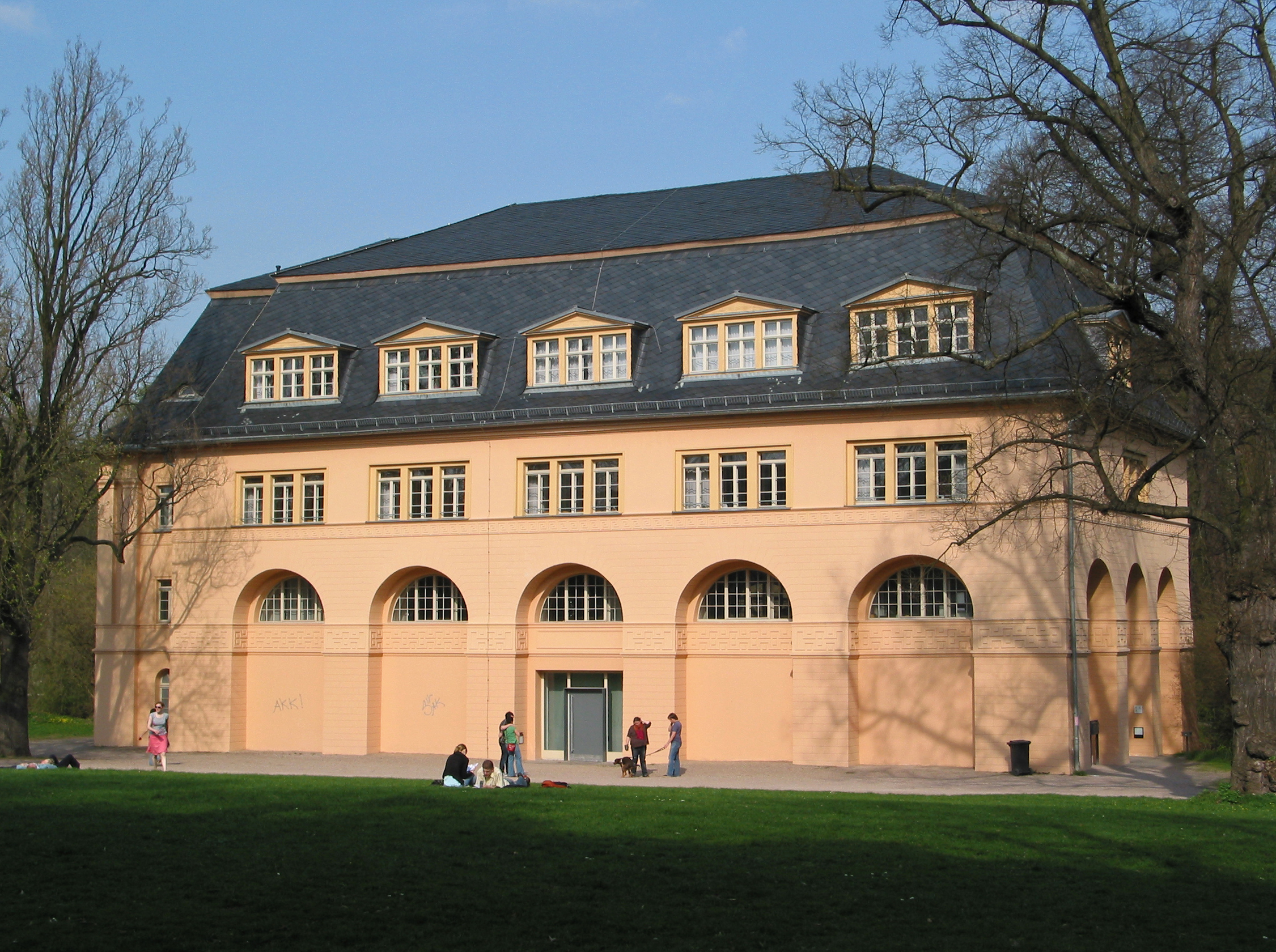
Reithaus

Furthermore, there are some impressive ducal country residences around Weimar. They are marked by their beautiful parks and gardens. Schloss Belvedere, south-east of Weimar was built between 1724 and 1732 in Baroque style with an orangery near to a ducal hunting forest. North-east of Weimar, at Ettersburg lies another ducal hunting lodge next to the Ettersberg mountain and its forest, Schloss Ettersburg. It was established between 1706 and 1711 also in Baroque style. The third summer residence, Schloss Tiefurt, is located in Tiefurt, north-east of Weimar. The small lodge in a wide park in Ilm valley was rebuilt in 1775 in late-Baroque forms.

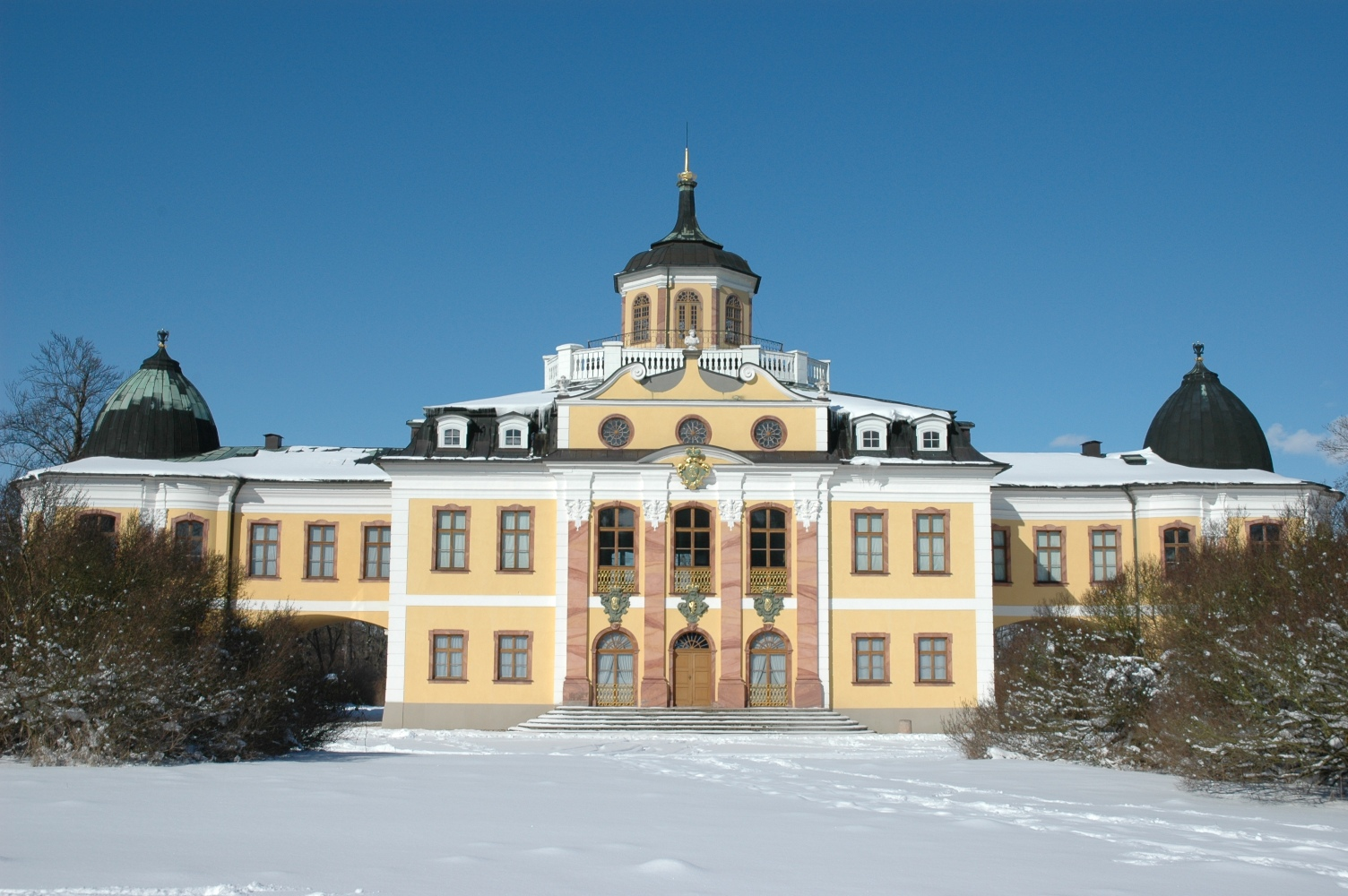
Schloss Belvedere, main building

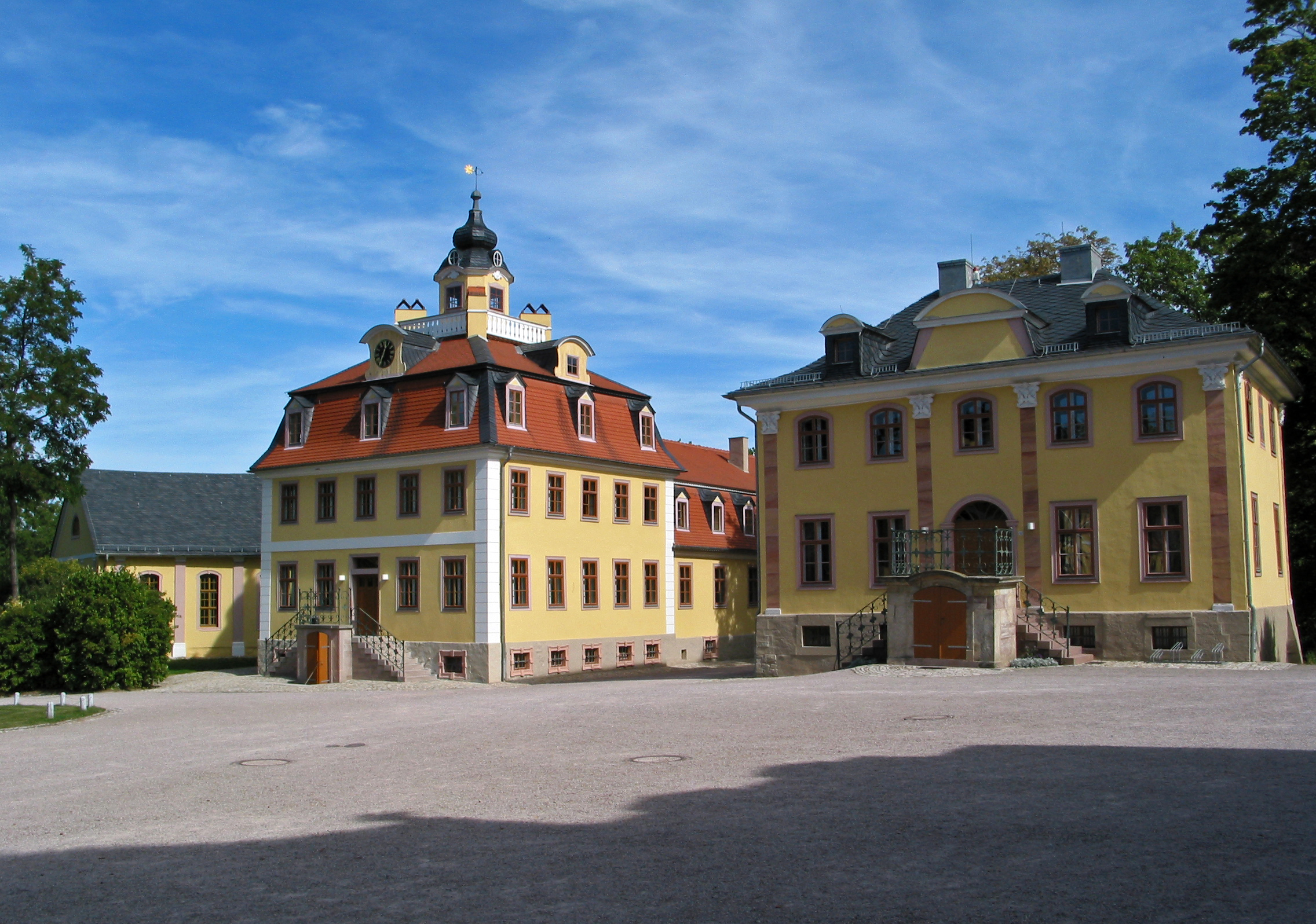
Schloss Belvedere, side buildings

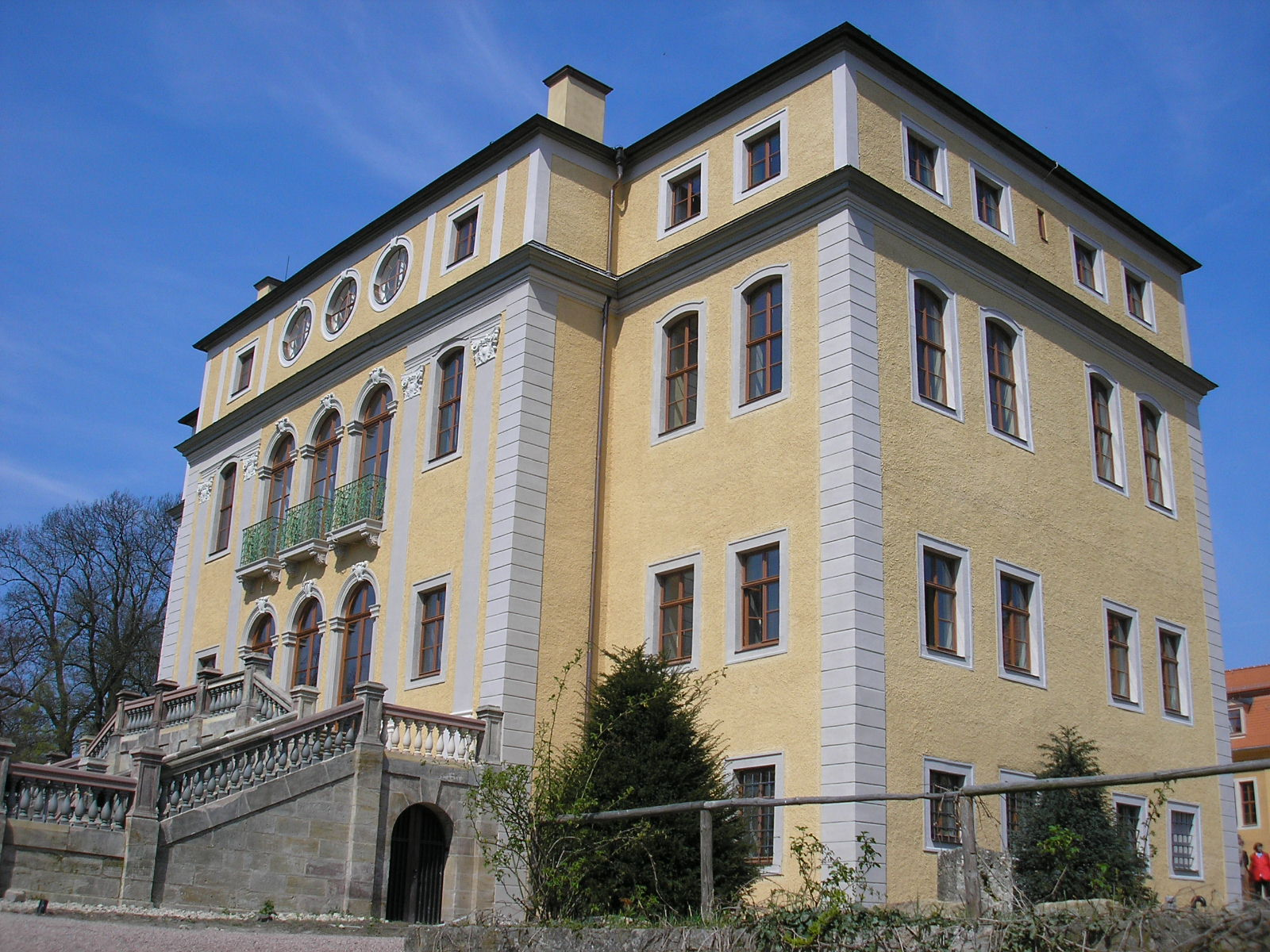
Schloss Ettersburg

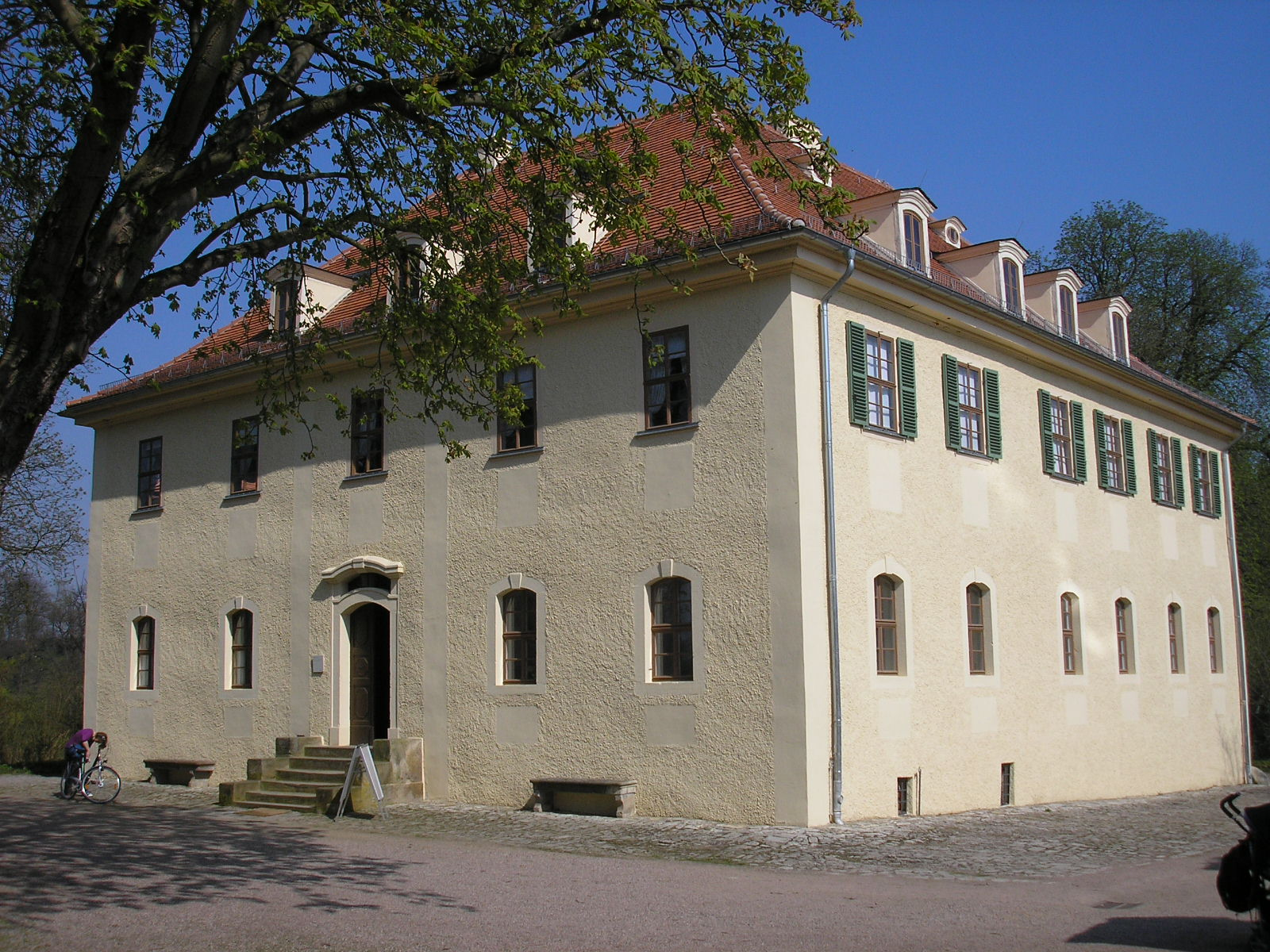
Schloss Tiefurt

==== Other sights ====
- The town hall at Marktplatz was built between 1837 and 1841 in Neo-Gothic style by Heinrich Heß after the former one (15th-century) burnt down.
- The two main buildings of Bauhaus University at Marienstraße are icons of 20th-century early-modern architecture. Both were built by Henry van de Velde between 1904 and 1911. They mark the transition from older Historicism and Art Nouveau to the new international modern style in Germany by their functional forms (e. g. skylights for better working conditions inside).
- The German National Theatre at Theaterplatz was built in 1906/07 in neo-classicist forms. Two predecessors were in use after 1779 and 1825 as ducal court theatres during Weimar's golden age. In 1919, the Weimar National Assembly developed the Weimar Constitution in this theatre.
- The Gauforum at Weimarplatz is a Roman-fascist style representative government district between the city centre and the main station. This Gauforum, designed by Hermann Giesler, was the only realized Nazi government district outside Berlin (whereas there were plans for all German state capitals). Today it hosts the Thuringian Administration State Department.
- The Park an der Ilm is the city's largest park along Ilm river between the ducal palace and the district of Oberweimar. It was established between 1778 and 1833 and is an English landscape garden today, part of UNESCO world heritage. Sights inside the park are Goethe's garden house (1690s) and Römisches Haus (in the style of a Roman temple, 1790s).
- The Historic Cemetery at Karl-Haußknecht-Straße was opened in 1818 and hosts the graves of Goethe, Schiller and many other famous people from Weimar.
- The Goethe-Schiller-Denkmal at Theaterplatz is the most famous memorial in Weimar. It was made by Ernst Rietschel between 1852 and 1857 and is dedicated to Goethe and Schiller, the most important poets of German classical literature.
- A rather unknown monument is the Lenin-light-box inside the theatre hall "La Redoute". It is a copy of a stained window by Alexander Leonidovich Korolev that shows Lenin in Petrograd (St. Petersburg).
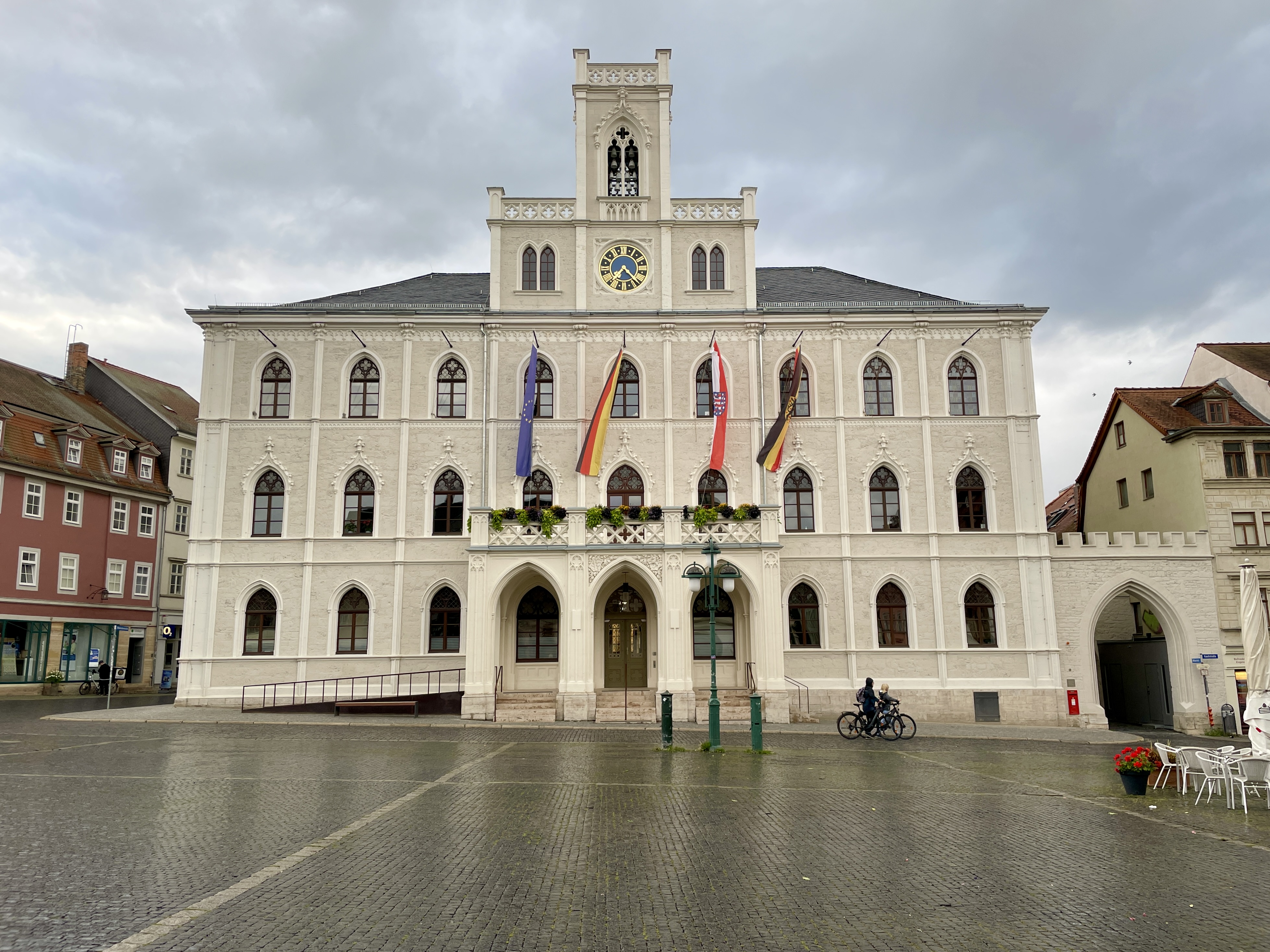
Town hall

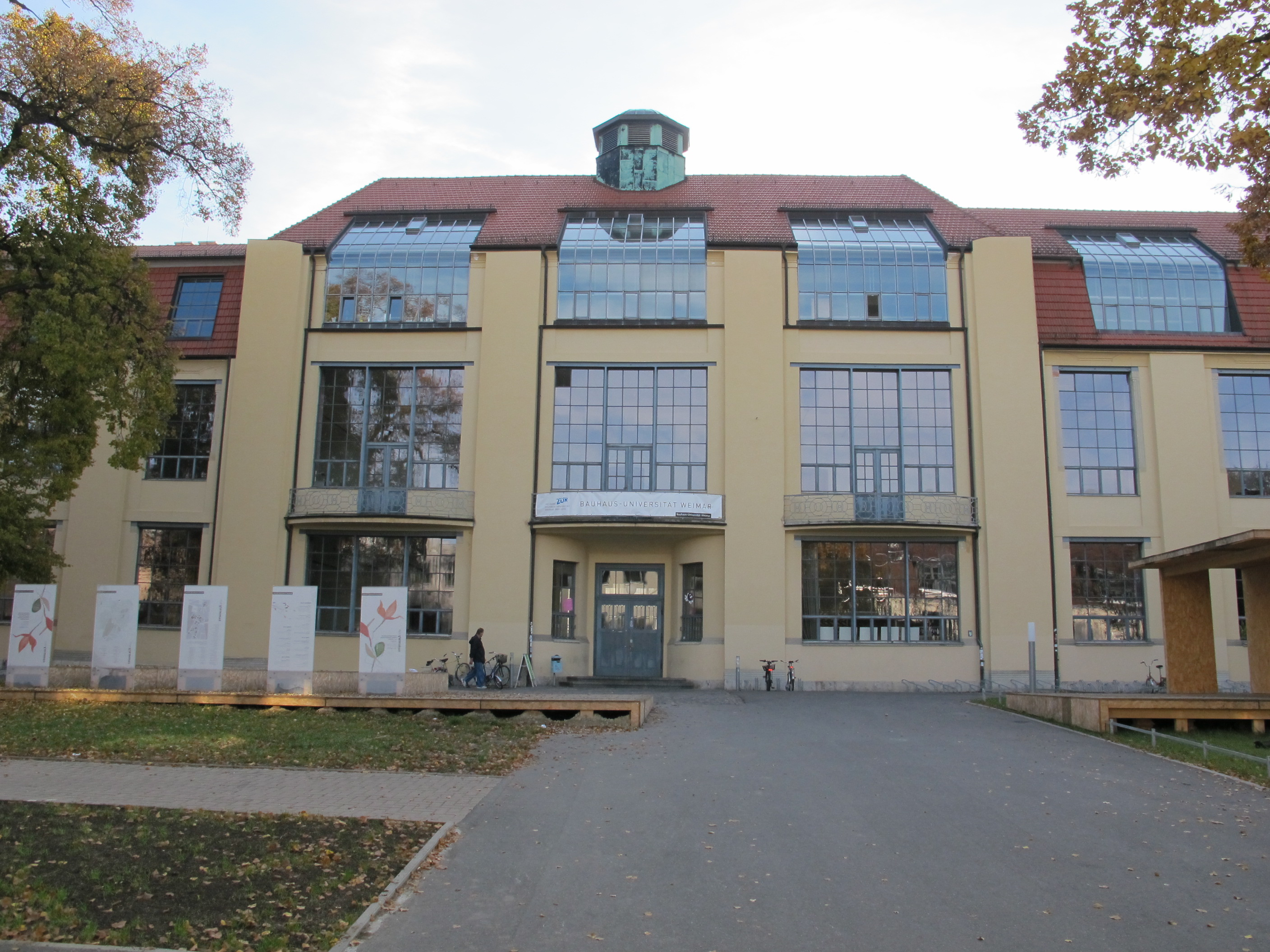
Southern main building of Bauhaus University

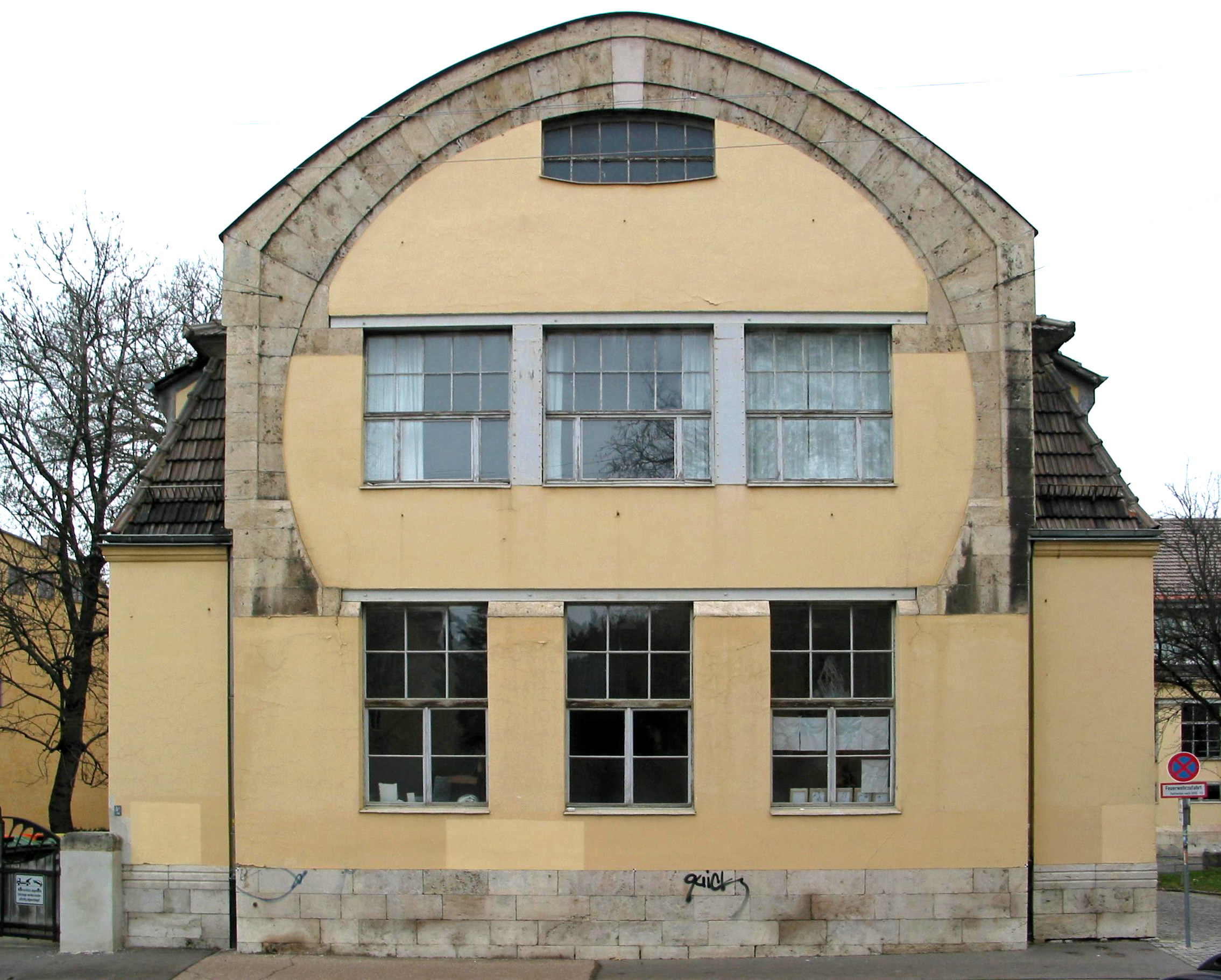
Northern main building of Bauhaus University

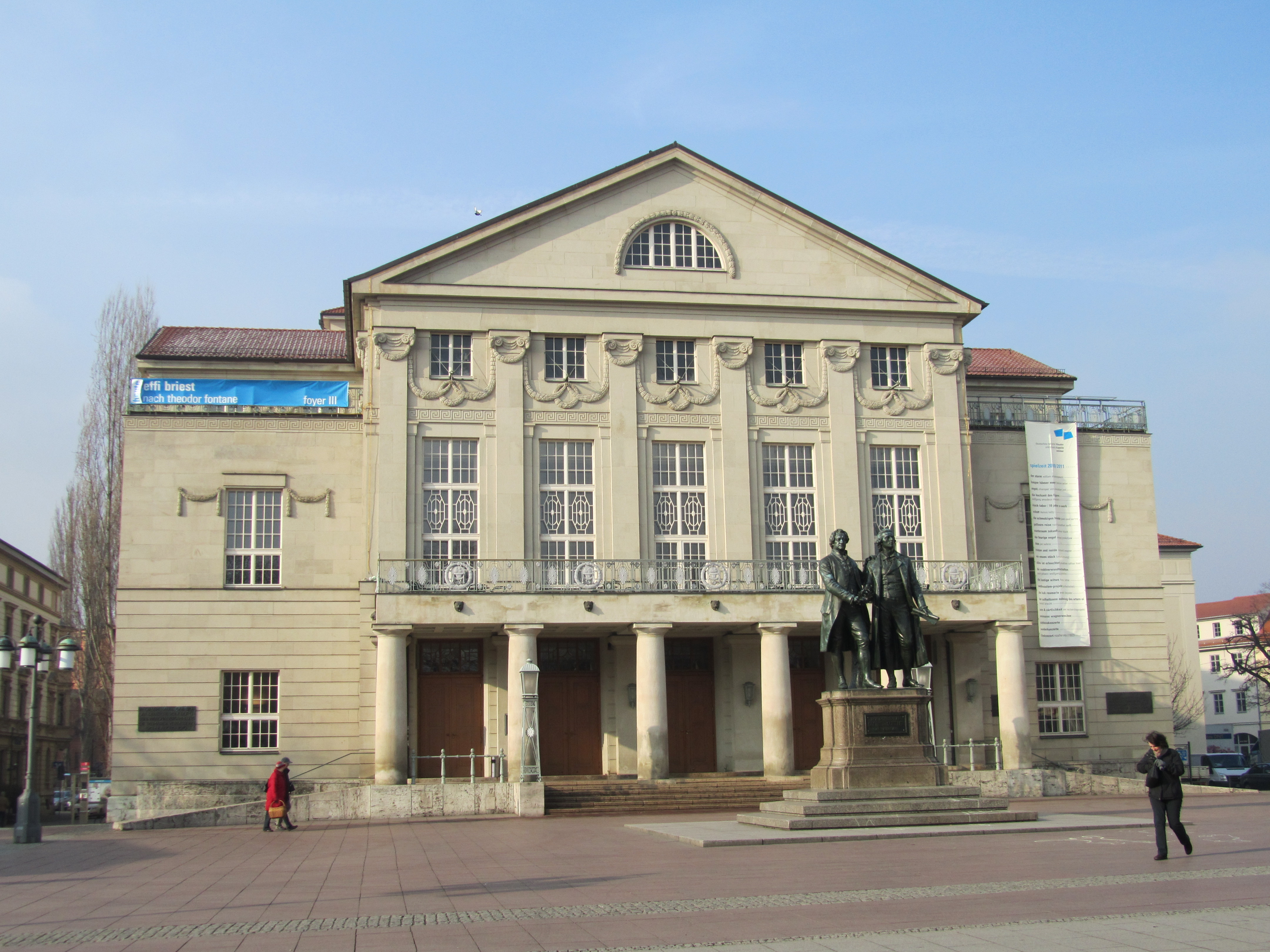
Theatre and Goethe-Schiller-Denkmal

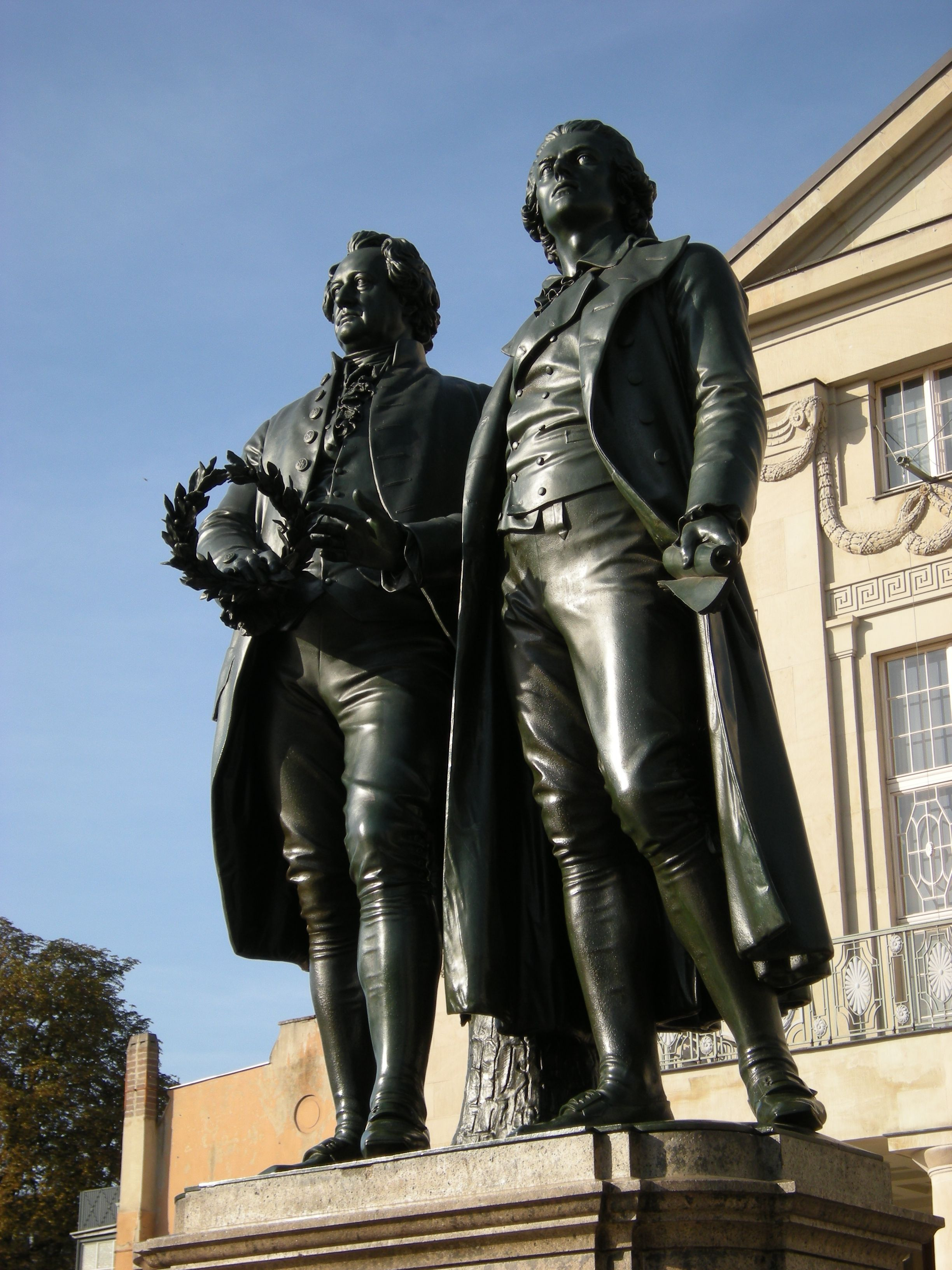
Goethe-Schiller-Denkmal

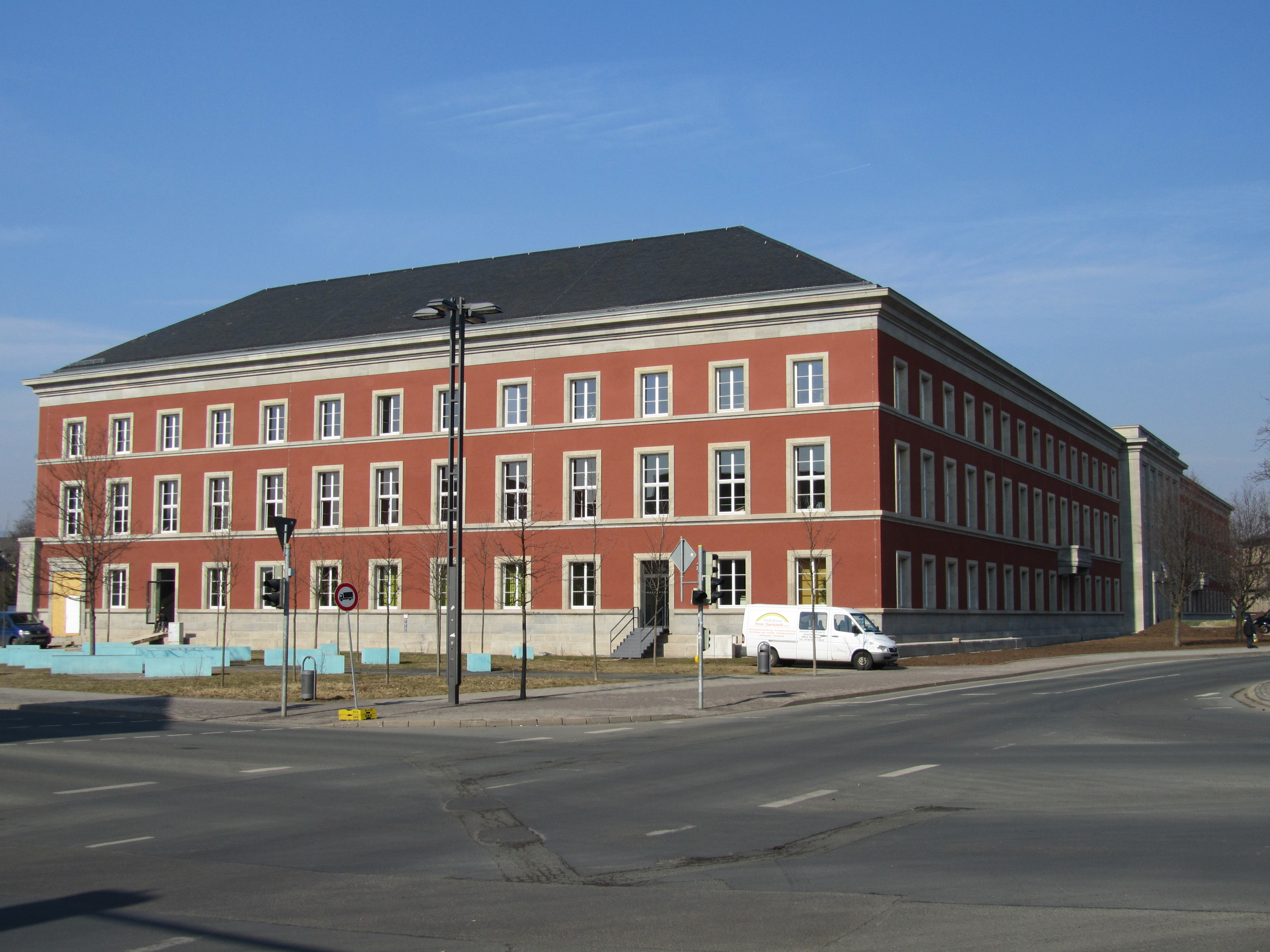
One building of the Gauforum

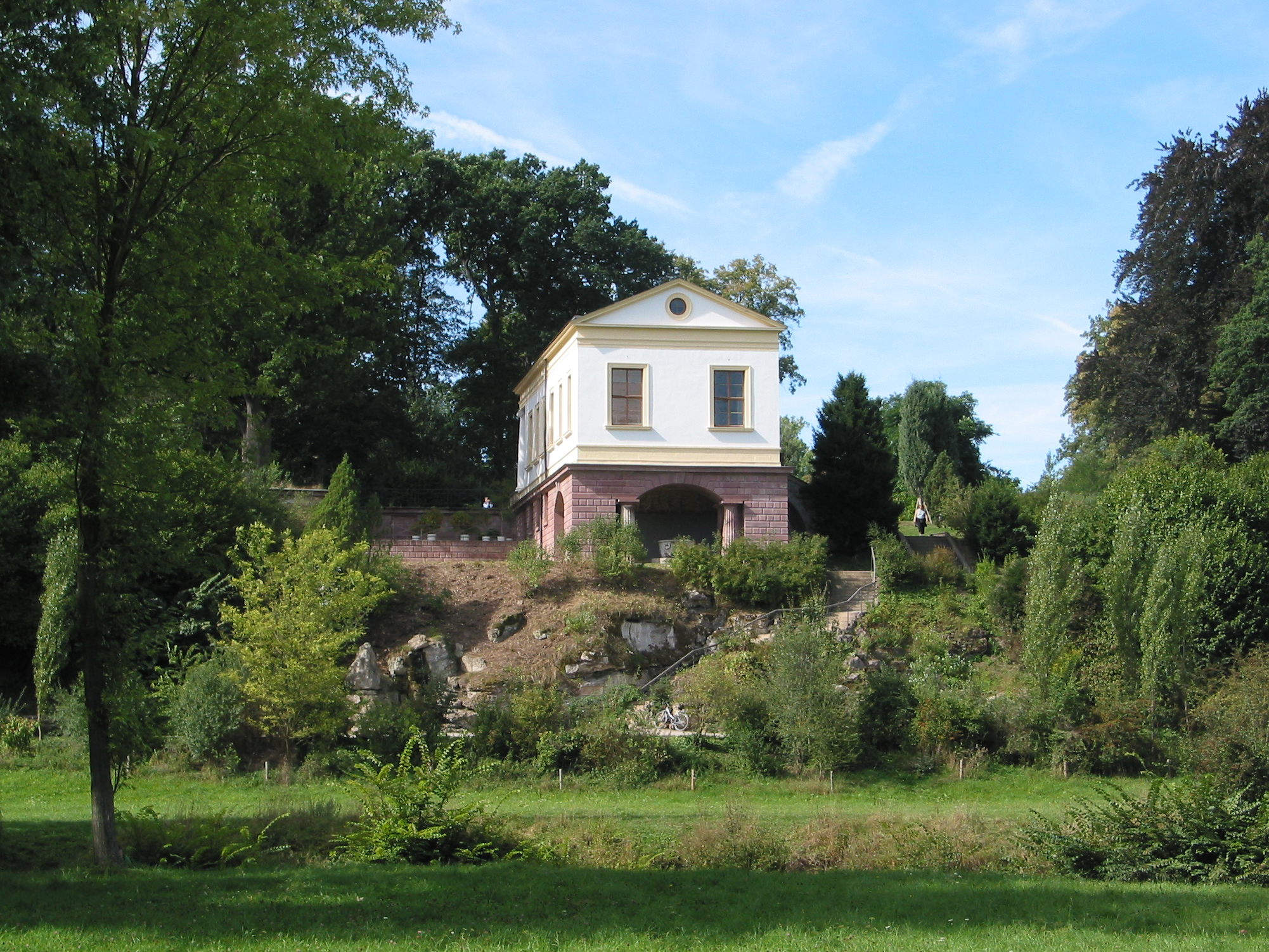
The Römisches Haus in Park an der Ilm

=== Events ===
Since 1998, Weimar has hosted the annual festival Yiddish Summer Weimar, a major celebration of klezmer music, Yiddish song, Yiddish Language, dance and culture.

The Onion Market (Weimarer Zwiebelmarkt) is an annual festival held in October in Weimar and it is Thuringia's largest festival. The festival is held over 3 days and approximately 500 stalls and more than 100 stage performances are put up across the city.

Weimar first celebrated the Onion Market in 1653. Stalls typically offer onion plaits, themed arts and crafts and numerous onion-based foods, including onion cakes, onion soups and onion breads. The festival also hosts numerous beer gardens, live music, fairground attractions and a Ferris wheel.

There are several clubs with live music once or twice a week. There is also a student club in the city centre which also features disco and live music events on Friday- and Saturday nights (Kasseturm). There are several smaller theatre and cabaret venues other than the large "DNT" (Deutsches National Theater). There are four cinemas including a 3-D cinema, and a Bowling Alley in the Weimar Atrium, the local mall.

== Economy and infrastructure ==
=== Agriculture, industry and services ===
The area around Weimar is relatively fertile and 48% of the municipal surface are used for agricultural production. Most common agricultures are cereals, maize and rapeseed, while famous agricultural products from the Weimar region are potatoes (especially from Heichelheim, 7 km (4.3 mi) to the north) for dishes with Thuringian dumplings (Knödel from potatoes), onions (from Heldrungen and Oldisleben, 45 km (28 mi) to the north), which are sold at Weimar Onion Market in October, and Saale-Unstrut wine from Bad Sulza, 25 km (16 mi) to the north-east.

Industry has never been dominant in Weimar, nevertheless there were several big factories from different sectors until 1990. After reunification, nearly all factories got closed, either because they failed the adoption of free market economy or because the German government sold them to west German businessmen who closed them to avoid competition to their own enterprises. On the other hand, the federal government started early in the 1990s to subsidize the foundation of new companies, but it took long time before the economic situation got stabilized around 2006. Since this time, unemployment decreased and overall, new jobs develop. Today, there are many small and medium-sized companies in Weimar with electro-technics and engineering in focus. Nevertheless, settlement of new factories isn't much in focus of the local government, because it concentrates itself on developing tourism and services. The biggest companies with production in Weimar are Bayer (pharmaceutical factory), Coca-Cola (beverages) and Hydrema (dump truck factory). A new big commercial zone was established in the 1990s in the neighbouring municipality of Nohra with focus on logistics and distribution.

Due to its tradition as a capital, Weimar is a centre of governmental services to date. Furthermore, creative branches like media, advertising, architecture and design are important for Weimar's economy. The most important sector is tourism with 3,500 hotel beds, 350,000 visitors and 650,000 overnight stays in hotels in 2012 and a large number of German one-day visitors. Other services like retail, trade fairs and specialized hospitals are more brought by the near neighbour cities Erfurt and Jena with their infrastructure.

=== Transport ===
==== By rail ====
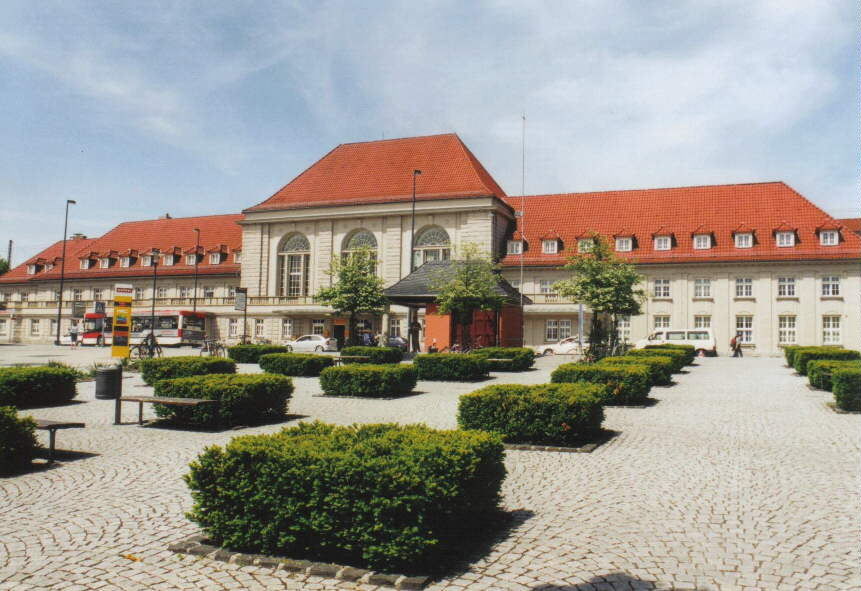
Weimar Railway Station

Weimar is connected by the Thuringian Railway to Leipzig in the east and to Frankfurt/Kassel in the west. Furthermore, there are some regional railways to Gera via Jena and to Kranichfeld via Bad Berka. Today, there are long-distance trains to Frankfurt via Erfurt and Fulda and to Dresden via Leipzig and regional trains to Göttingen and Eisenach via Erfurt, to Halle via Naumburg, to Altenburg, Glauchau, Zwickau and Greiz via Jena and Gera and to Kranichfeld. After the new Erfurt–Leipzig/Halle high-speed railway was opened in 2015, Weimar was disconnected from the German long-distance train network. However the regional train service are augmented to connect Weimar with ICE-stops in Erfurt, Halle and Leipzig.

In freight transport exists an intermodal terminal in Vieselbach (Güterverkehrszentrum/GVZ) with connection to rail and Autobahn, 15 km (9.3 mi) west of Weimar.

==== By road ====
Weimar is located at the Bundesautobahn 4 (Frankfurt–Dresden). Furthermore, there are two federal roads to Erfurt and Jena (Bundesstraße 7) and to Rudolstadt and Kölleda (Bundesstraße 85) as well as some regional roads to Sömmerda, Oßmannstedt and Magdala. A bypass road around Weimar was built in the 2000s in the north and west; the eastern and southern continuation are in discussion, but not in definite planning because of some difficulties in routing.

==== By aviation ====
The Erfurt-Weimar Airport lies approximately 30 km (19 mi) west of Weimar. It was largely extended in the 1990s, but the anticipated rise in passengers did not occur so that there is only rare air traffic, mostly to Mediterranean holiday regions. Other flights are carried out via Frankfurt Airport, which can be reached in 3 hours, and via Berlin Brandenburg Airport, which is also about 3 hours away.

==== By bike ====
Biking is becoming more popular since the construction of quality cycle tracks began in the 1990s. For tourism, there are the Ilm track and the Thuringian city string track (Radweg Thüringer Städtekette). Both connect points of tourist interest, the first along the Ilm valley from the Thuringian Forest to the Saale river and the second close to medieval Via Regia from Eisenach via Gotha, Erfurt, Weimar, and Jena to Altenburg. Additionally, there are themed routes like the Goethe cycle track and the Feininger cycle track. For inner city everyday traffic, some cycle lanes exist along several main streets. Bike rental is offered in the city centre.

==== Bus service ====
For a small city, Weimar is well served by city bus routes, which also serve all of the surrounding towns and villages. An hourly bus route serves the Buchenwald Memorial and oldtimer buses operate in the city's historical centre. All bus routes are connected at Goethe Square in the city centre, and many also serve the main railway station. Trams served the city from 1899 to 1937. Trolleybus service started in 1948 and was discontinued in 1993.

=== Education ===
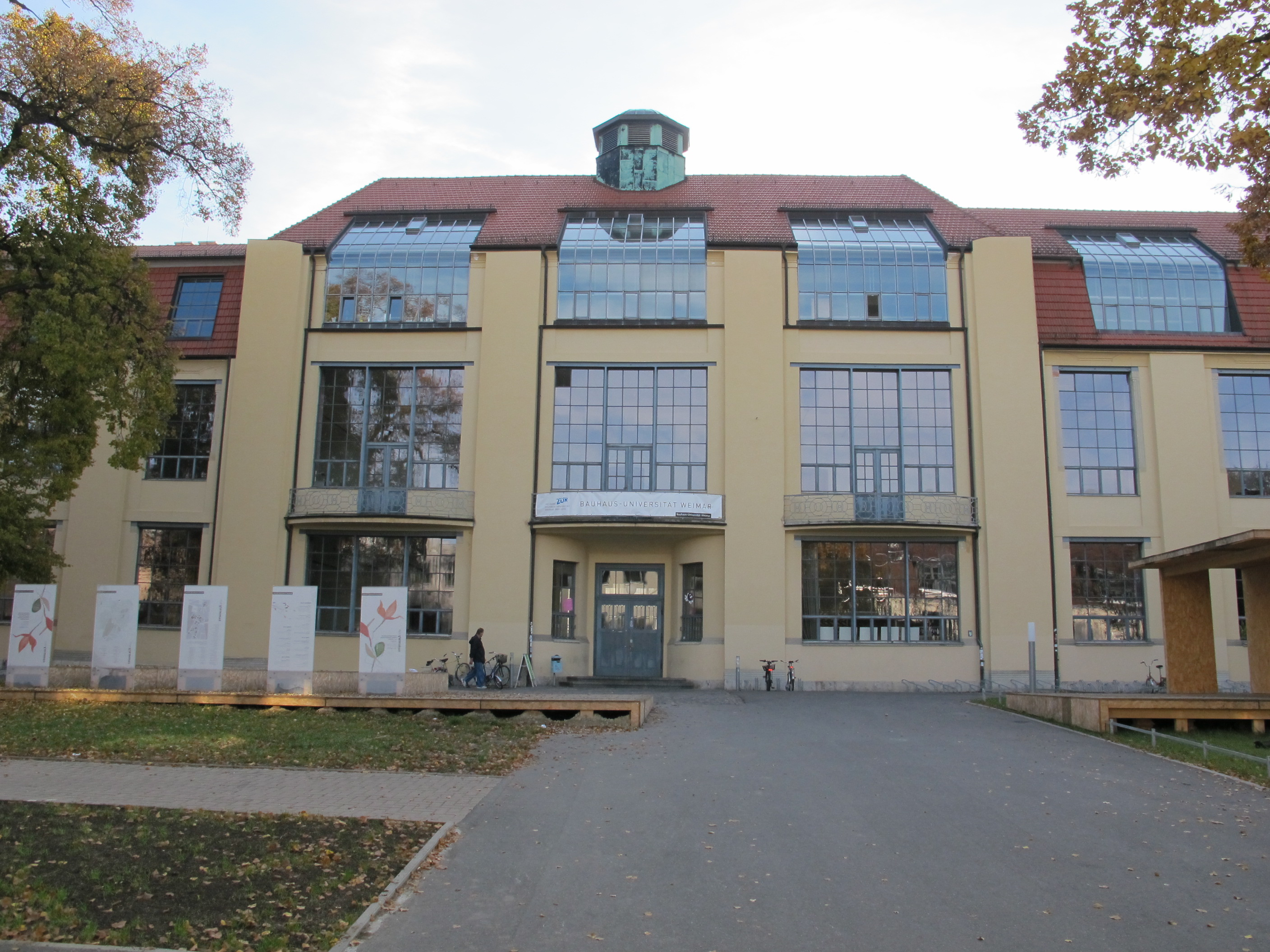
University's main building

After the reunification, the educational system was realigned. Some academies were combined into the new Bauhaus University, founded in 1996 with approximately 4,200 students and focus on architecture, design and media. The Liszt School of Music is a university focussed on music and music education founded in 1872 with 850 students today. Furthermore, there are three regular Gymnasiums, the Musikgymnasium Schloss Belvedere, an elite boarding school with focus on music, and the Thuringia International School with an international (and foreign language) curriculum.

The most important archives in Weimar are the Goethe- und Schiller-Archiv (member of UNESCO Memory of the World Programme) with focus on German literary history and the Thuringia Main State Archive with governmental documents from last 500 years. The Duchess Anna Amalia Library hosts books and documents of German literary and cultural history.

== Politics ==
=== Mayor and city council ===
The most recent mayoral election was held on 26 May 2024, and the results were as follows:

Candidate	Party	Votes	%
Peter Kleine	Independent (CDU/Weimarwerk)	21,808	72.7
Stefan Markus Giebel	The Left	3,057	10.2
Andreas Leps	Alliance 90/The Greens	2,923	9.7
André Störr	Social Democratic Party	2,192	7.3
Valid votes		29,980	97.6
Invalid votes		745	2.4
Total		30,725	100.0
Electorate/voter turnout		50,968	60.3
Source: Wahlen in Thüringen

The most recent city council election was held on 26 May 2024, and the results were as follows:

Party	Lead candidate	Votes	%	±	Seats	±
Christian Democratic Union (CDU)	Jörg Geibert	17,581	19.9	▲2.4	8	▲1
Weimarwerk Citizens' Alliance	Wolfgang Hölzer	15,558	17.6	▼0.3	7	0
Alliance 90/The Greens (Grüne)	Andreas Leps	13,579	15.4	▼3.1	6	▼2
Social Democratic Party (SPD)	Thomas Hartung	12,520	14.2	▲1.0	6	0
The Left (Die Linke)	Hubert Krüger	12,227	13.8	▼2.4	6	▼1
Alternative for Germany (AfD)	Karl-Heinz Stöpel	12,099	13.7	▲2.7	6	▲1
Free Democratic Party (FDP)	Angelika Hampicke	2,414	2.7	▼0.9	1	0
Pirate Party/Humanists (Piraten/PdH)	Oliver Kröning	1,195	1.4	New	1	New
dieBasis	Uwe Schnetter	1,200	1.4	New	1	New
Valid votes		88,373	100.0			
Invalid ballots		1,123	3.6			
Total ballots		30,776	96.4		42	±0
Electorate/voter turnout		50,968	60.4	▼1.1		
Source: Wahlen in Thüringen

=== Lord Mayor ===
List of mayors and lord mayors (since 1793)

The years behind the names indicate the years of office, whereby the year of office did not correspond to the calendar year.

Since 1838, the city has had a lord mayor.

- 1793–1797: Johann Heinrich Siegmund Rentsch
- 1798–1811: Carl Adolph Schultze
- 1811–1813: Daniel Wilhelm Brunnquell
- 1813: Carl Christian August Paulssen
- 1814–1820: Bernhard Friedrich Rudolph Kuhn
- 1820–1838: Carl Leberecht Schwabe
- 1838–1850: Carl Georg Hase
- 1851–1866: Wilhelm Christian Friedrich Bock
- 1867–1873: Otto Schäffer
- 1873–1875: Leo Fürbringer (conservative)
- 1875–1910: Karl Pabst (liberal)
- 1910–1920: Martin Donndorf (non-party)
- 1920–1937: Walther Felix Mueller (non-party)
- 1937–1945: Otto Koch (NSDAP)
- 15–30 April 1945: Erich Kloss (non-party)
- 1 April–5 November 1945: Fritz Behr (SPD)
- 1945–1946: Otto Faust (SPD/SED)
- 1946–1948: Gerhard Hempel (LDP)
- 1948–1953: Hermann Buchterkirchen (CDU)
- 1953–1959: Hans Wiedemann (politician) (CDU)
- 1960–1969: Luitpold Steidle (CDU)
- 1969–1970: Paul Ullmann (CDU)
- 1970–1982: Franz Kirchner (CDU)
- 1982–1989: Gerhard Baumgärtel (CDU)
- 1989–1990: Volkhardt Germer (acting) (SED)
- 6–2 June. July 1990: Wolfgang Hentzschel (CDU)
- 27 July 1990 – 1994: Klaus Büttner (CDU)
- 1994–2006: Volkhardt Germer (non-party)
- 2006–2018: Stefan Wolf (SPD)
- since 1 July 2018: Peter Kleine (independent, for CDU and Weimarwerk Civic Alliance)

== Twin towns – sister cities ==
Weimar is twinned with:

- Blois, France
- Hämeenlinna, Finland
- Siena, Italy
- Trier, Germany
- Zamość, Poland

=== Friendly cities ===
Weimar also has friendly relations with:

- Fulda, Germany
- Jerusalem, Israel
- Kamakura, Japan
- Shiraz, Iran

== Notable people ==
- Anna Amalia
- Johann Sebastian Bach
- Friedrich Baumbach
- Hector Berlioz
- Hans von Bülow
- Peter Cornelius
- Lucas Cranach the Elder
- Marlene Dietrich
- Johann Peter Eckermann
- Lyonel Feininger
- Paul Feyerabend
- Ute Freudenberg
- Caspar David Friedrich
- Uziel Gal
- Johann Wolfgang von Goethe
- Auguste Götze
- Walter Gropius
- Ulrike Grosse-Röthig
- Peter Gülke
- Nina Hagen
- Johann Gottfried Herder
- John Horrocks
- Johann Nepomuk Hummel
- Johannes Itten
- Joseph Joachim
- Wassily Kandinsky
- Andrey Kartapolov
- Harry Graf Kessler
- Paul Klee
- Serhiy Kulchytsky
- Christine Lieberknecht
- Ulrike Liedtke
- Franz Liszt
- Martin Luther
- László Moholy-Nagy
- Friedrich Nietzsche
- Andreas Oswald
- Jean Paul
- Friedrich Preller the Elder
- Friedrich Preller the Younger
- Joseph Joachim Raff
- Friedrich Schiller
- Baldur von Schirach
- Oskar Schlemmer
- Arthur Schopenhauer
- Frédéric Soret
- Rudolf Steiner
- Richard Strauss
- Harry Thürk
- Marcus Urban
- Henry van de Velde
- Christiane Vulpius
- Eberhard Wagner
- Richard Wagner
- Dorothea Juliana Wallich
- Johann Gottfried Walther
- Christoph Martin Wieland
- Carl Zeiss
