= Gramme-Aue =

Coordinates: 51.068°N 11.085°E

Gramme-Aue is a former Verwaltungsgemeinschaft ("collective municipality") in the district of Sömmerda, in Thuringia, Germany. The seat of the Verwaltungsgemeinschaft was in Großrudestedt. On 31 December 2019, it merged into the new Verwaltungsgemeinschaft Gramme-Vippach.

The Verwaltungsgemeinschaft Gramme-Aue consisted of the following municipalities:

1. Alperstedt
2. Großmölsen
3. Großrudestedt
4. Kleinmölsen
5. Nöda
6. Ollendorf
7. Udestedt
