= An der Marke =

Coordinates: 51.100°N 11.118°E

An der Marke is a former Verwaltungsgemeinschaft ("collective municipality") in the district of Sömmerda, in Thuringia, Germany. The seat of the Verwaltungsgemeinschaft was in Schloßvippach. On 31 December 2019 it merged into the new Verwaltungsgemeinschaft Gramme-Vippach.

The Verwaltungsgemeinschaft An der Marke consisted of the following municipalities:

1. Eckstedt
2. Markvippach
3. Schloßvippach
4. Sprötau
5. Vogelsberg
