= Gramme (disambiguation) =

Gramme (or gram) is a unit of mass.

Gramme may also refer to:

- Gramme (river), a river in Thuringia, Germany
- Gramme-Aue, a former Verwaltungsgemeinschaft ("collective municipality") in Thuringia, Germany
- Gramme-Vippach, a Verwaltungsgemeinschaft ("collective municipality") in Thuringia, Germany
- Gramme machine, an electrical generator
- 2666 Gramme, a minor planet
- Institut Gramme, a graduate school of engineering part of Haute École HELMo in Liege in Belgium

== People with that surname ==
- Zénobe Gramme (1826–1901), Belgian electrical engineer
