= Herrnschwende =

- Ortsteil of Weißensee
- Interactive map of Herrnschwende
- Location within Germany Location within Thuringia
- Coordinates: 51°13′30″N 11°01′20″E
- Country: Germany
- State: Thuringia
- District: Sömmerda
- Town: Weißensee
- Subdivisions: 2

Area
  - Total: 8.62 km^{2} (3.33 sq mi)
- Elevation: 150 m (490 ft)

Population (2017-12-31)
  - Total: 273
  - Density: 31.7/km^{2} (82.0/sq mi)
- Time zone: UTC+01:00 (CET)
  - Summer (DST): UTC+02:00 (CEST)
- Postal codes: 99631
- Dialling codes: 036374
- Vehicle registration: SÖM

Herrnschwende (German pronunciation: [ˈhɛʁnʃvɛndə]) is a village and a former municipality in the Sömmerda district of Thuringia, Germany. Since 1 January 2019, it is part of the town Weißensee.
