= Henschleben =

- Ortsteil of Straußfurt
- Interactive map of Henschleben
- Location within Germany Location within Thuringia
- Coordinates: 51°8′N 10°58′E
- Country: Germany
- State: Thuringia
- District: Sömmerda
- Municipality: Straußfurt

Area
  - Total: 6.98 km^{2} (2.69 sq mi)
- Elevation: 149 m (489 ft)

Population (2018-12-31)
  - Total: 333
  - Density: 47.7/km^{2} (124/sq mi)
- Time zone: UTC+01:00 (CET)
  - Summer (DST): UTC+02:00 (CEST)
- Postal codes: 99634
- Dialling codes: 036376
- Website: vgstraussfurt.de

Henschleben (German pronunciation: [ˈhɛnʃleːbn̩]) is a village and a former municipality in the Sömmerda district of Thuringia, Germany. Since December 2019, it is part of the municipality Straußfurt.
