= Ihab Ali Nawawi =

Ihab Mohamed Ali Nawawi
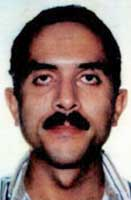
- Born: ~1962
- Other names: Nawawi; Abu al Tayar; Yousef Kanana; Abu Sulaiman

An Egyptian-American cab driver, Ihab Mohamed Ali Nawawi became a personal pilot to Osama bin Laden in the early 1990s.

== Life ==
Nawawi moved to the United States as a youth with his family, and attended an Orlando high school before traveling to fight in the Soviet invasion of Afghanistan.

He trained at the Airman Flight School in Norman, Oklahoma, before joining the fledgling al-Qaeda in the Sudan. In the 1990s, he worked for the Muslim World League in Pakistan.

L'Houssaine Kherchtou later testified in the United States that he had seen an Egyptian briefing Nawawi on air traffic control procedures, leading him to believe that an attack on an airplane, possibly in Saudi Arabia, was in the works.

== Sudan ==
After Wadih el-Hage asked Essam al-Ridi to sell a private Sabre-40 jet on the Egyptian market, al-Ridi traveled to Khartoum where he met with Nawawi and the pair of them tried to repair the plane; however the brakes failed after a test flight with both men flying, and the plane crashed into a sand dune. The event attracted public attention, since the plane was unique in being a private aircraft at Khartoum International Airport and known to belong to Osama bin Laden. Worried that the Egyptian Mukhabarat would learn of his whereabouts, al-Ridi fled the Sudan.

== Return to United States ==
Nawawi returned to the United States in 1996.

When Ali Mohamed moved to the United States, Nawawi helped him make the transition. When Mohamed was arrested as a double agent working for both Egyptian Islamic Jihad and the CIA, a letter from Nawawi was discovered in his house that urged him to give "best regards to your friend Osama".

He was arrested May 18, 1999, in Orlando. In September 2000, he was charged with contempt of court and perjury.

In March 2001, Nawawi pleaded guilty to perjury, criminal contempt and conspiring to kill U.S. nationals and agreed to cooperate with the prosecution. At a May 2009 sentencing, he received time served after spending a decade in prison and was released.
