= Kannawurf =

Village in Thuringia, Germany

- Ortsteil of Kindelbrück
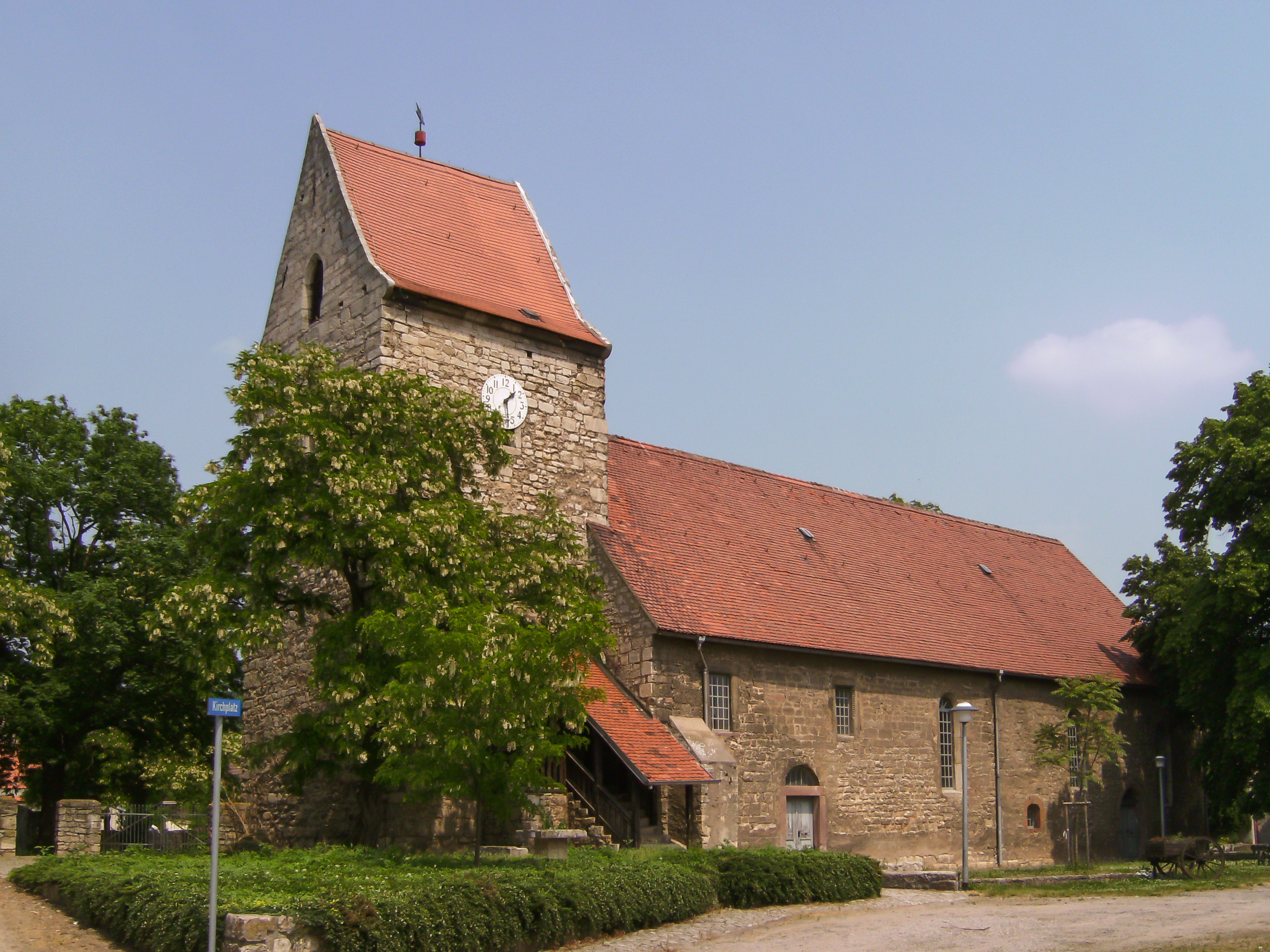
- Kannawurf, church
- Interactive map of Kannawurf
- Location within Germany Location within Thuringia
- Coordinates: 51°16′N 11°8′E
- Country: Germany
- State: Thuringia
- District: Sömmerda
- Municipality: Kindelbrück

Area
  - Total: 15.53 km^{2} (6.00 sq mi)
- Elevation: 138 m (453 ft)

Population (31 December 2018)
  - Total: 784
  - Density: 50.5/km^{2} (131/sq mi)
- Time zone: UTC+01:00 (CET)
  - Summer (DST): UTC+02:00 (CEST)
- Postal codes: 06578
- Dialling codes: 036375

Kannawurf (German pronunciation: [ˈkanaˌvʊʁf]) is a village and a former municipality in the Sömmerda district of Thuringia, Germany. Since 1 January 2019, it is part of the municipality Kindelbrück.

== Demographics ==
Historical population
Year	Pop.	±%
1994	1,093	—
1998	1,043	−4.6%
2003	1,014	−2.8%
2008	898	−11.4%
2013	805	−10.4%
2018	784	−2.6%
Source: "Thüringer Landesamt für Statistik" (in German).
