= Frömmstedt =

- Ortsteil of Kindelbrück
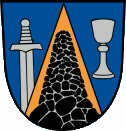
- Coat of arms
- Interactive map of Frömmstedt
- Location within Germany Location within Thuringia
- Coordinates: 51°15′N 11°1′E
- Country: Germany
- State: Thuringia
- District: Sömmerda
- Municipality: Kindelbrück

Area
  - Total: 12.11 km^{2} (4.68 sq mi)
- Elevation: 163 m (535 ft)

Population (2017-12-31)
  - Total: 500
  - Density: 41/km^{2} (110/sq mi)
- Time zone: UTC+01:00 (CET)
  - Summer (DST): UTC+02:00 (CEST)
- Postal codes: 99638
- Dialling codes: 036375
- Website: www.froemmstedt.de

Frömmstedt (German pronunciation: [ˈfʁœmʃtɛt]) is a village and a former municipality in the Sömmerda district of Thuringia, Germany. Since 1 January 2019, it is part of the municipality Kindelbrück.
