= Rüdiger Schnuphase =

East German footballer

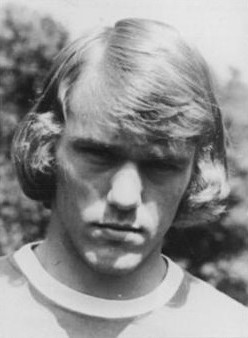
- Schnuphase in 1974

Personal information
- Date of birth: 23 January 1954 (age 72)
- Place of birth: Werningshausen, East Germany
- Height: 1.80 m (5 ft 11 in)
- Position: Midfielder

Senior career*
Years	Team	Apps	(Gls)
1971–1977	Rot-Weiß Erfurt	99	(24)
1977–1984	Carl Zeiss Jena	196	(94)
1984–1986	Rot-Weiß Erfurt	31	(6)
Total		326	(124)

International career
1973–1983	East Germany	45	(6)
- * Club domestic league appearances and goals

Olympic medal record

Men's Football

Representing East Germany
Silver medal – second place	1980 Moscow	Team competition

Rüdiger Schnuphase (born 23 January 1954 in Werningshausen) is a German former football player.

Schnuphase played for FC Rot-Weiß Erfurt (1971–1976), FC Carl Zeiss Jena (1976–1984) and again FC Rot-Weiß Erfurt (1984–1986).

On the national level he played for East Germany national team (45 matches/6 goals), and was a participant at the 1974 FIFA World Cup. Schnuphase played in two matches in Gelsenkirchen at football's biggest stage.

In 1982, he won the award for the GDR Footballer of the Year.
