= 1964 T-39 shootdown incident =

Cold War incident involving an American T-39 being shot down by a Soviet MiG-19

- Part of the Cold War
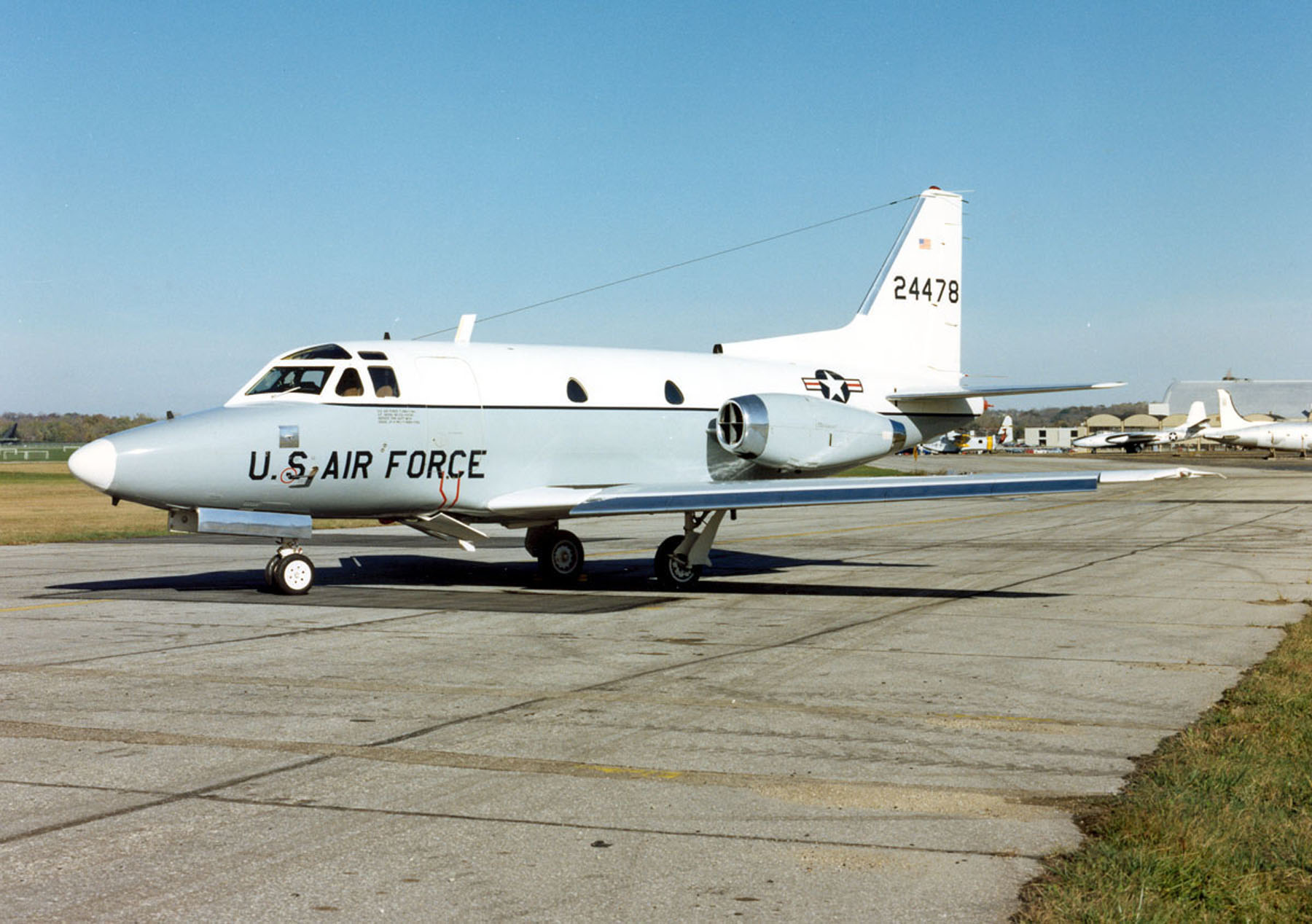
- A T-39 Sabreliner of the U.S. Air Force
| Date | 28 January 1964 |
| Location | Vogelsberg, East Germany 51°07′10″N 11°14′00″E |
| Result | One aircraft shot down |

Belligerents
| United States | Soviet Union |

Casualties and losses
| 3 USAF officers killed | None |
- Location within East Germany

On 28 January 1964, an unarmed T-39 Sabreliner aircraft of the United States Air Force (USAF) was shot down while on a training mission over Erfurt, East Germany, by a MiG-19 jet fighter of the Soviet Air Force. The occupants of the aircraft were Lieutenant Colonel Gerald K. Hannaford, Captain Donald Grant Millard, and Captain John F. Lorraine. All three died, becoming direct casualties of the Cold War in Europe.

== Background ==
The Cold War developed between the Soviet bloc and the United States, Canada, and Western European nations. Tensions were highest between the United States and the Soviet Union in the regions bordering the Iron Curtain, notably West Germany and East Germany, and relations between the two superpowers were characterized by hostile attitudes, spying, and numerous incidents resulting in loss of life and equipment. One of the most famous of these is the 1960 U-2 incident when the Soviets shot down a Lockheed U-2 spy plane piloted by Francis Gary Powers over the Soviet Union in May 1960.

== Event ==
On 28 January 1964, an unarmed USAF North American T-39A Sabreliner twin engine jet trainer, 62-4448, of the 7101st Air Base Wing, departed Wiesbaden Air Base, West Germany, at 14:10 hours on a routine three-hour training flight. On board the trainer were three men, Captain John F. Lorraine and students Lieutenant Colonel Gerald K. Hannaford and Captain Donald G. Millard. Lorraine was the qualified instructor, while Hannaford and Millard, both pilots with experience on other types, were being trained in order to qualify on the T-39.

The flight proceeded uneventfully until, 47 minutes after takeoff, radar at two U.S. air defense stations noticed that the trainer was heading toward East Germany at 500 miles per hour (800 km/h). Hoping to divert the T-39 back on course, each station began hailing the plane on USAF frequencies and a Soviet-monitored international distress band. Repeated calls to the T-39 went unanswered. It appeared that the T-39's radio systems malfunctioned and the crew were unable to respond.

The T-39 crossed the border into East Germany. Within five minutes, two blips appeared near the American jet. For 11 minutes, radar blips indicated the three planes were moving eastward, then two blips suddenly veered west and the third blip disappeared. American personnel monitoring the T-39's flight could not determine what had happened, although it was later reported that residents in Vogelsberg, 50 miles (80 km) from the border, had heard machine-gun and cannon fire and had witnessed the plane crash. The incident is believed to have occurred at 15:14 hours.

At 17:00 hours on 28 January the United States Military Liaison Mission (USMLM), in Berlin, received a warning to stand by for possible search and rescue of American airmen. By 18:00 hours, a search team left Berlin for the Erfurt area of East Germany. At 19:15 hours, the chief of the USMLM met with his Soviet counterpart to request help in finding the plane and rescuing survivors (in accordance with the Huebner–Malinin Agreement).

At 20:00 hours, a second search team left Berlin. About this same time, the first team arrived at the crash site, 20 kilometers (12 mi) north of Erfurt. The first team received a report from an East German civilian that a U.S. plane had crashed and burned, and that the crew was dead. Throughout the night, the American teams tried to approach the aircraft and were repeatedly sent away by the armed Soviet forces on site. These forces denied that any aircraft had crashed, and the two American search teams were detained briefly before being released at 14:00 hours on 29 January.

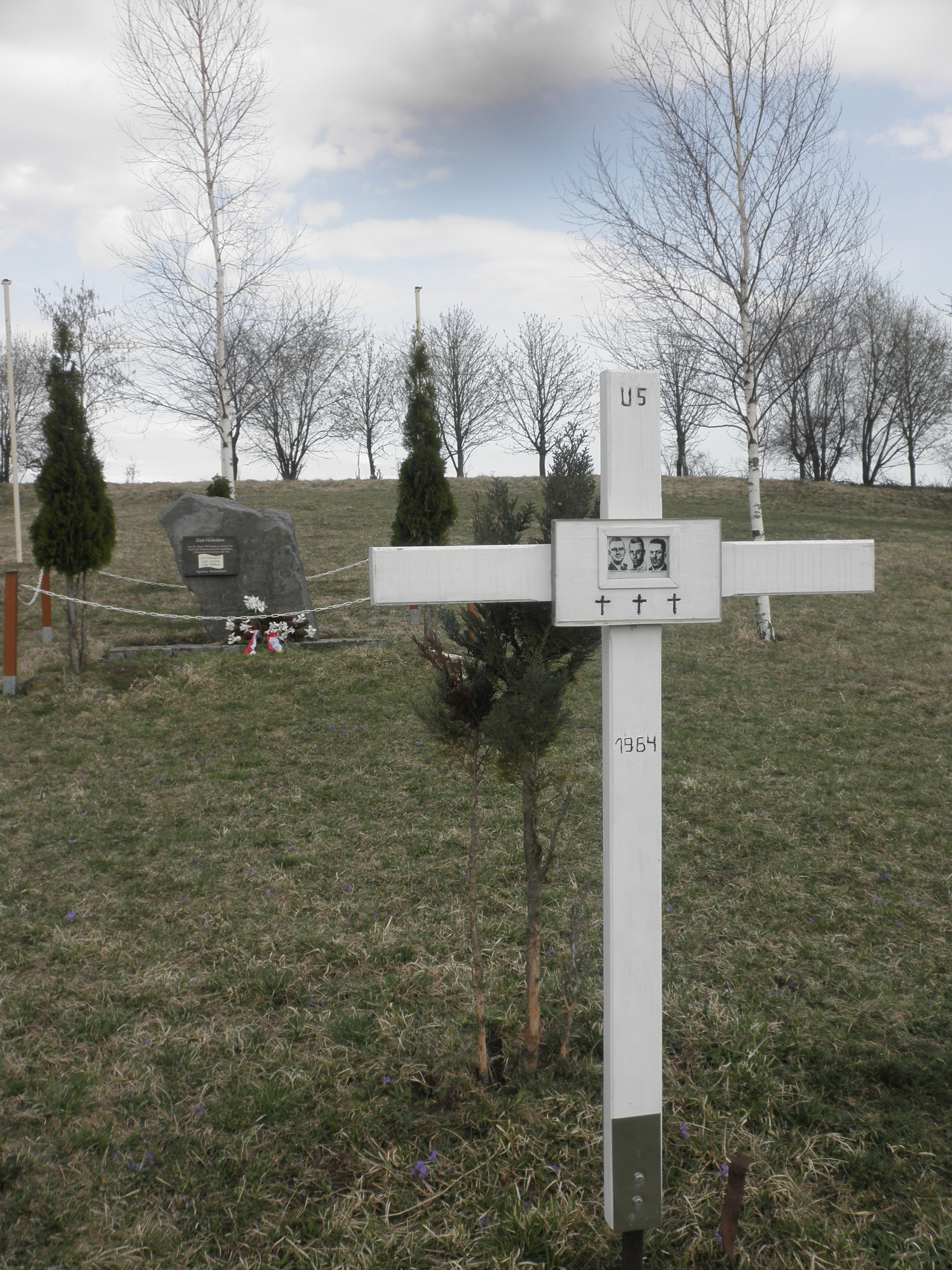
Memorial to the three aircrew, near Vogelsberg (Thuringia)

== Aftermath ==
By 29 January, the United States State Department charged that the Soviet Union shot down an unarmed plane and caused the needless deaths of three officers. Secretary of State Dean Rusk called the action a "shocking and senseless act." Through the Soviet press agency, Tass, Moscow claimed that the plane had intruded over East German territory and failed to react to signals, and then a warning shot. The Soviets said they were compelled to take the measure that brought down the U.S. plane.

On 30 January, the Soviets agreed to allow US personnel access to the crash site. This occurred the following day and later the bodies of all three servicemen were returned to the United States through Andrews Air Force Base in Maryland. General Curtis E. LeMay met the plane and participated in an honors ceremony. The aircraft wreckage was also recovered and was taken to Berlin, arriving there on 1 February 1964.

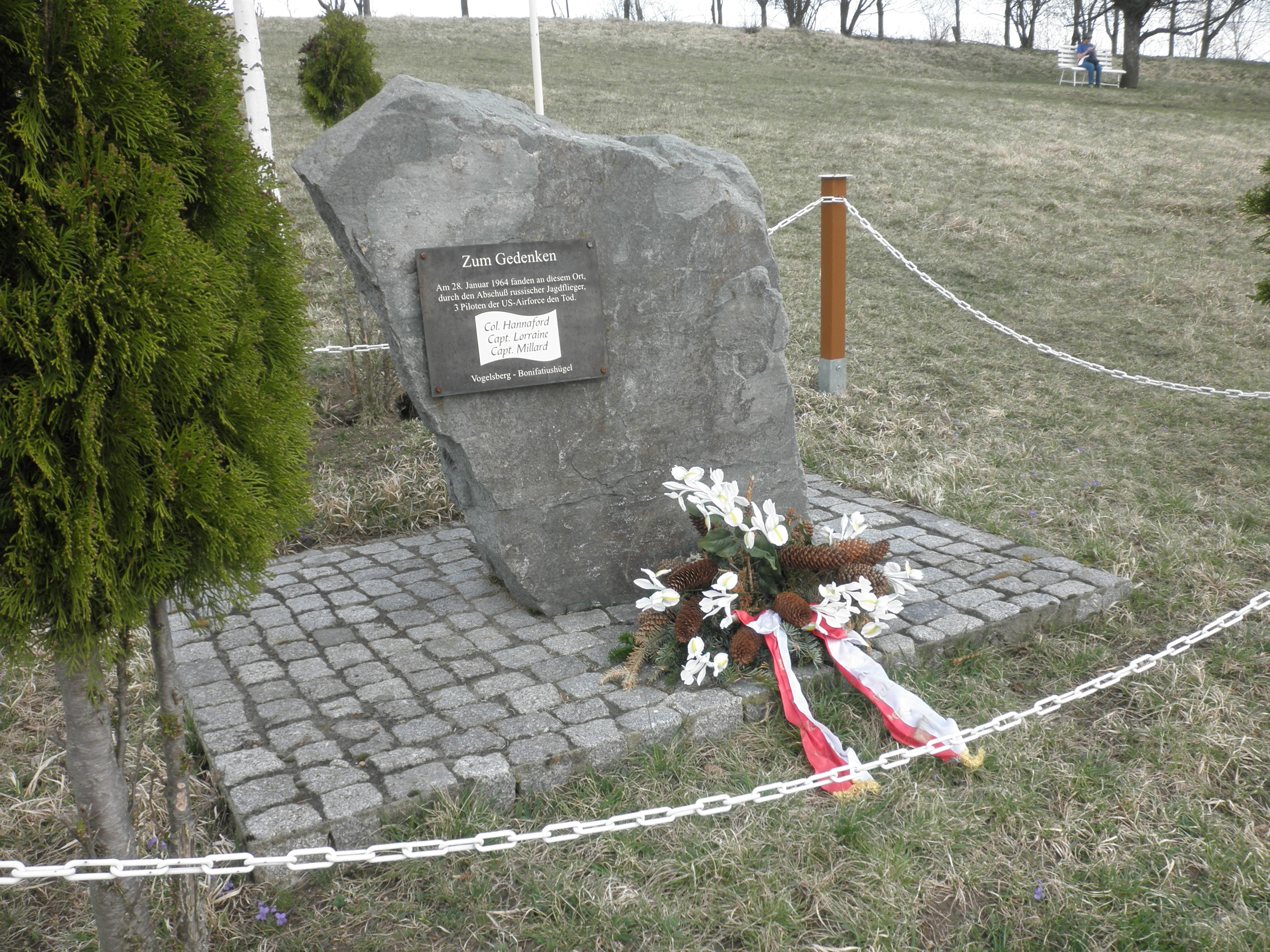
Memorial at the crash site near Vogelsberg

== Memorial ==
Residents from the nearby town of Vogelsberg in Thuringia erected a memorial to the three downed pilots, in 1998, once the Iron Curtain had been lifted.

== See also ==
- 1961 F-84 Thunderstreak incident
