= Riethgen =

- Ortsteil of Kindelbrück
- Interactive map of Riethgen
- Location within Germany Location within Thuringia
- Coordinates: 51°15′N 11°7′E
- Country: Germany
- State: Thuringia
- District: Sömmerda
- Municipality: Kindelbrück

Area
  - Total: 6.81 km^{2} (2.63 sq mi)
- Elevation: 131 m (430 ft)

Population (2021-12-31)
  - Total: 241
  - Density: 35.4/km^{2} (91.7/sq mi)
- Time zone: UTC+01:00 (CET)
  - Summer (DST): UTC+02:00 (CEST)
- Postal codes: 99638
- Dialling codes: 036375
- Website: www.riethgen.de

Riethgen (German pronunciation: [ˈʁiːtɡn̩]) is a village and a former municipality in the Sömmerda district of Thuringia, Germany. On 1 January 2023 it became part of the municipality Kindelbrück.
