= Riethnordhausen, Thuringia =

Riethnordhausen
- Municipality
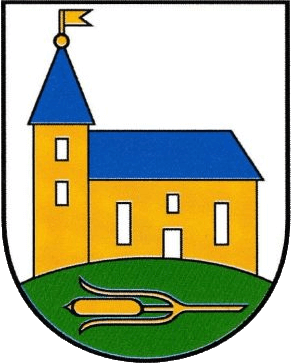
- Coat of arms

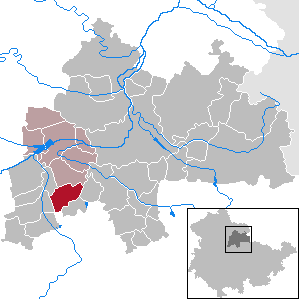
- Location of Riethnordhausen within Sömmerda district
- Interactive map of Riethnordhausen
- Location within Germany Location within Thuringia
- Coordinates: 51°5′N 11°0′E
- Country: Germany
- State: Thuringia
- District: Sömmerda
- Municipal assoc.: Straußfurt

Government
  - Mayor (2022–28): Ringo Kraft

Area
  - Total: 12.93 km^{2} (4.99 sq mi)
- Elevation: 160 m (520 ft)

Population (2025-12-31)
  - Total: 971
  - Density: 75.1/km^{2} (194/sq mi)
- Time zone: UTC+01:00 (CET)
  - Summer (DST): UTC+02:00 (CEST)
- Postal codes: 99195
- Dialling codes: 036204
- Vehicle registration: SÖM
- Website: www.riethnordhausen.de

Riethnordhausen is a municipality in the Sömmerda district of Thuringia, Germany.
