= Kindelbrück (Verwaltungsgemeinschaft) =

Municipal association in Thuringia, Germany

- Verwaltungsgemeinschaft
- Map of Sömmerda highlighting Kindelbrück
- Interactive map of Kindelbrück
- Location within Germany Location within Thuringia
- Coordinates: 51°16′N 11°04′E
- Country: Germany
- State: Thuringia
- District: Sömmerda
- Seat: Kindelbrück
- Subdivisions: 4 municipalities

Area
  - Total: 88.96 km^{2} (34.35 sq mi)

Population (2025-12-31)
  - Total: 4,973
  - Density: 55.90/km^{2} (144.8/sq mi)
- Time zone: UTC+01:00 (CET)
  - Summer (DST): UTC+02:00 (CEST)
- Website: www.vg-kindelbrueck.de

Kindelbrück is a Verwaltungsgemeinschaft ("collective municipality") in the district of Sömmerda, in Thuringia, Germany. The seat of the Verwaltungsgemeinschaft is in Kindelbrück.

The Verwaltungsgemeinschaft Kindelbrück consists of the following municipalities:

1. Büchel
2. Griefstedt
3. Günstedt
4. Kindelbrück
