= Günstedt =

- Municipality
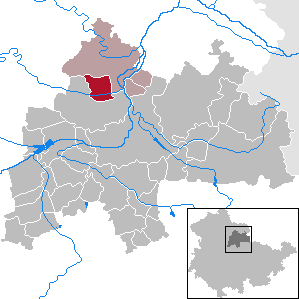
- Location of Günstedt within Sömmerda district
- Interactive map of Günstedt
- Location within Germany Location within Thuringia
- Coordinates: 51°13′28″N 11°04′42″E
- Country: Germany
- State: Thuringia
- District: Sömmerda
- Municipal assoc.: Kindelbrück

Government
  - Mayor (2022–28): Claudia Knirsch

Area
  - Total: 12.58 km^{2} (4.86 sq mi)
- Elevation: 133 m (436 ft)

Population (2025-12-31)
  - Total: 689
  - Density: 54.8/km^{2} (142/sq mi)
- Time zone: UTC+01:00 (CET)
  - Summer (DST): UTC+02:00 (CEST)
- Postal codes: 99631
- Dialling codes: 036374
- Vehicle registration: SÖM
- Website: www.guenstedt.de

Günstedt is a municipality in the Sömmerda district of Thuringia, Germany.
