= Witterda =

- Municipality
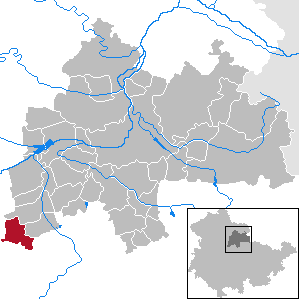
- Location of Witterda within Sömmerda district
- Interactive map of Witterda
- Location within Germany Location within Thuringia
- Coordinates: 51°2′N 10°53′E
- Country: Germany
- State: Thuringia
- District: Sömmerda

Government
  - Mayor (2024–30): René Heinemann

Area
  - Total: 12.47 km^{2} (4.81 sq mi)
- Elevation: 314 m (1,030 ft)

Population (2025-12-31)
  - Total: 1,068
  - Density: 85.65/km^{2} (221.8/sq mi)
- Time zone: UTC+01:00 (CET)
  - Summer (DST): UTC+02:00 (CEST)
- Postal codes: 99189
- Dialling codes: 036201
- Vehicle registration: SÖM

Witterda is a municipality in the Sömmerda district of Thuringia, Germany.
