= Ringleben, Sömmerda =

Ringleben
- Municipality
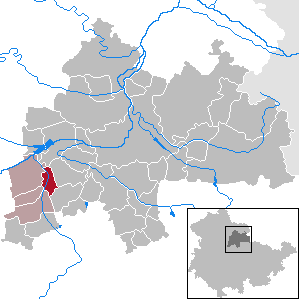
- Location of Ringleben within Sömmerda district
- Interactive map of Ringleben
- Location within Germany Location within Thuringia
- Coordinates: 51°22′4″N 11°13′18″E
- Country: Germany
- State: Thuringia
- District: Sömmerda
- Municipal assoc.: Gera-Aue

Government
  - Mayor (2024–30): Martin Müller

Area
  - Total: 6.56 km^{2} (2.53 sq mi)
- Elevation: 153 m (502 ft)

Population (2025-12-31)
  - Total: 471
  - Density: 71.8/km^{2} (186/sq mi)
- Time zone: UTC+01:00 (CET)
  - Summer (DST): UTC+02:00 (CEST)
- Postal codes: 99189
- Dialling codes: 036201
- Vehicle registration: SÖM
- Website: www.Ringleben.eu

Ringleben (German pronunciation: [ˈʁɪŋˌleːbn̩]) is a municipality in the Sömmerda district of Thuringia, Germany.
