= Straußfurt =

- Municipality
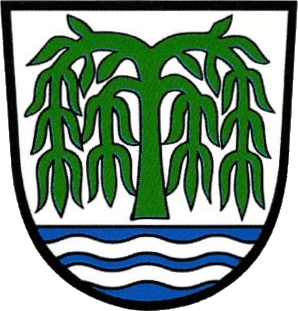
- Coat of arms

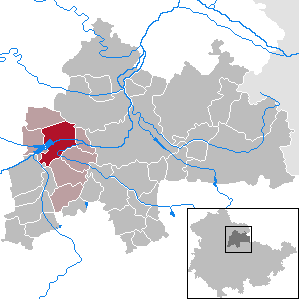
- Location of Straußfurt within Sömmerda district
- Interactive map of Straußfurt
- Location within Germany Location within Thuringia
- Coordinates: 51°10′N 10°59′E
- Country: Germany
- State: Thuringia
- District: Sömmerda
- Municipal assoc.: Straußfurt

Government
  - Mayor (2021–27): Olaf Starroske

Area
  - Total: 21.85 km^{2} (8.44 sq mi)
- Elevation: 150 m (490 ft)

Population (2025-12-31)
  - Total: 1,930
  - Density: 88.3/km^{2} (229/sq mi)
- Time zone: UTC+01:00 (CET)
  - Summer (DST): UTC+02:00 (CEST)
- Postal codes: 99634
- Dialling codes: 036376
- Vehicle registration: SÖM
- Website: www.straussfurt.de

Straußfurt (German pronunciation: [ˈʃtʁaʊsfʊʁt]) is a municipality in the Sömmerda district of Thuringia, Germany. The former municipality Henschleben was merged into Straußfurt in December 2019.
