= Gebesee =

- Town
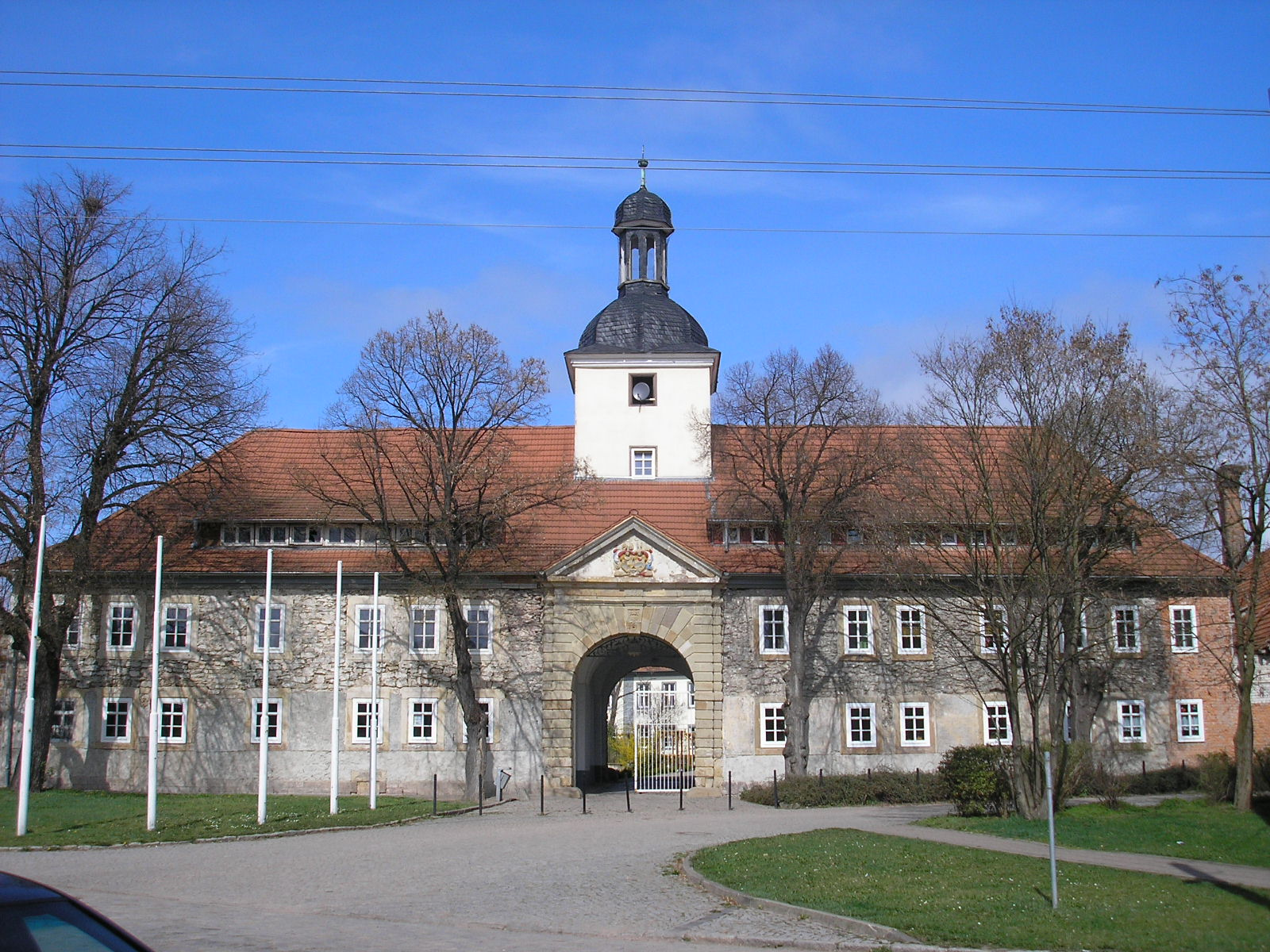
- Castle

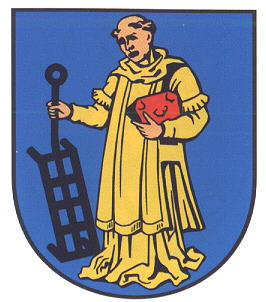
- Coat of arms

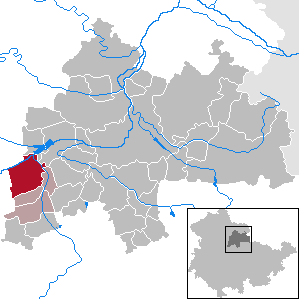
- Location of Gebesee within Sömmerda district
- Interactive map of Gebesee
- Location within Germany Location within Thuringia
- Coordinates: 51°6′50″N 10°56′05″E
- Country: Germany
- State: Thuringia
- District: Sömmerda
- Municipal assoc.: Gera-Aue

Government
  - Mayor (2023–29): Lukas Rothe

Area
  - Total: 24.08 km^{2} (9.30 sq mi)
- Elevation: 153 m (502 ft)

Population (2025-12-31)
  - Total: 2,181
  - Density: 90.57/km^{2} (234.6/sq mi)
- Time zone: UTC+01:00 (CET)
  - Summer (DST): UTC+02:00 (CEST)
- Postal codes: 99189
- Dialling codes: 036201
- Vehicle registration: SÖM

Gebesee (German pronunciation: [ˈɡeːbəzeː]) is a town in the district of Sömmerda, in Thuringia, Germany. It is situated near the confluence of the rivers Gera and Unstrut, 18 km northwest of Erfurt.
