= Gera-Aue =

- Verwaltungsgemeinschaft
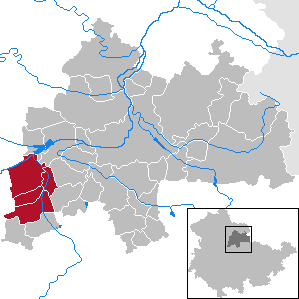
- Map of Sömmerda highlighting Gera-Aue
- Interactive map of Gera-Aue
- Location within Germany Location within Thuringia
- Coordinates: 51°07′N 10°55′E
- Country: Germany
- State: Thuringia
- District: Sömmerda
- Seat: Gebesee
- Subdivisions: 4 municipalities

Area
  - Total: 54.33 km^{2} (20.98 sq mi)

Population (2025-12-31)
  - Total: 5,020
  - Density: 92.4/km^{2} (239/sq mi)
- Time zone: UTC+01:00 (CET)
  - Summer (DST): UTC+02:00 (CEST)
- Website: www.vg-gera-aue.de

Gera-Aue is a Verwaltungsgemeinschaft ("collective municipality") in the district of Sömmerda, in Thuringia, Germany. The seat of the Verwaltungsgemeinschaft is in Gebesee.

The Verwaltungsgemeinschaft Gera-Aue consists of the following municipalities:

1. Andisleben
2. Gebesee
3. Ringleben
4. Walschleben
