= North American Sabreliner =

American business jet

Sabreliner
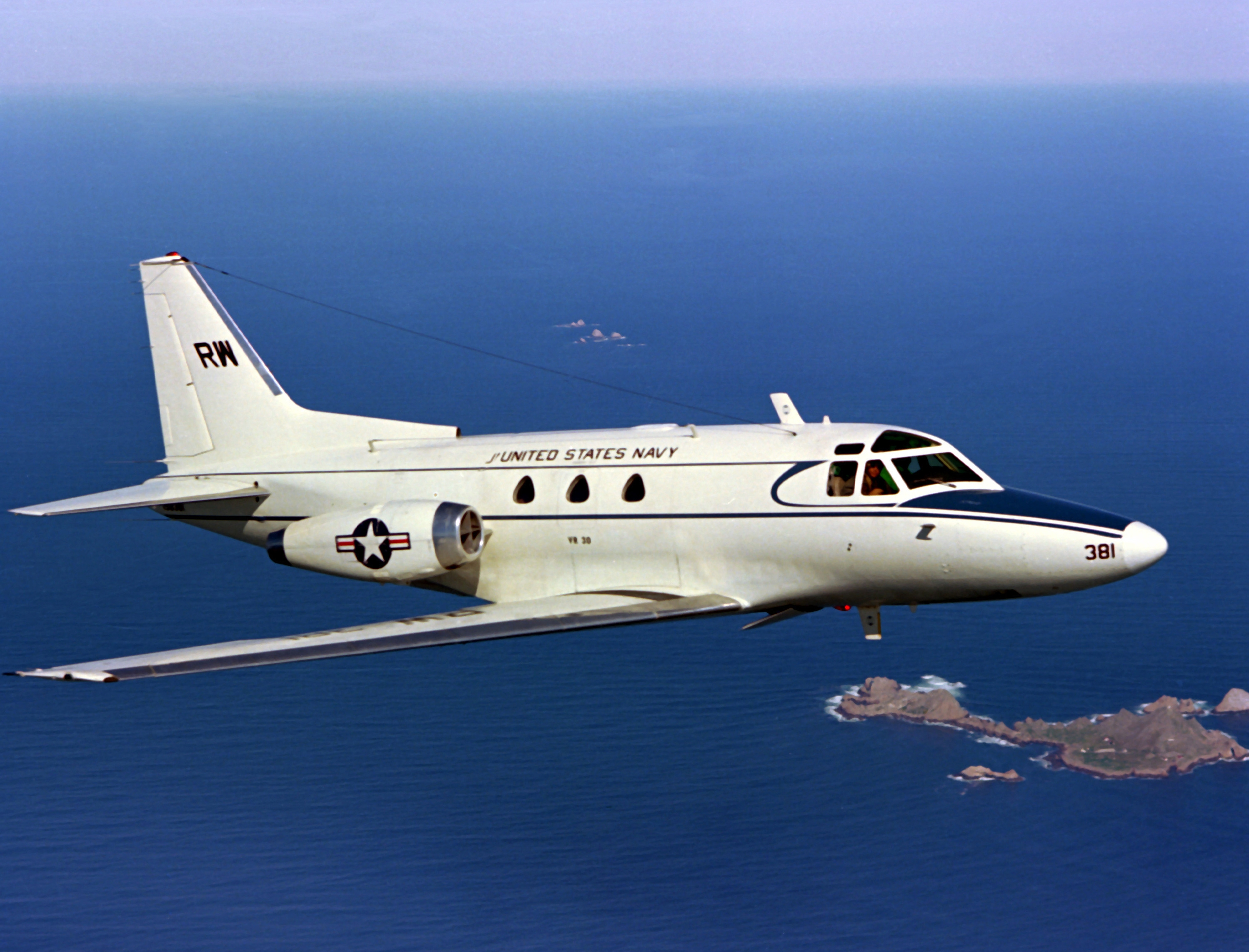
- United States Navy CT-39E of VR-30 in 1980

General information
- Type: Trainer aircraft Business jet
- Manufacturer: North American Aviation; Rockwell International
- Status: In active service
- Primary users: United States Air Force United States Navy; United States Marine Corps
- Number built: 800+

History
- Manufactured: 1959–1982
- Introduction date: 1962
- First flight: September 16, 1958

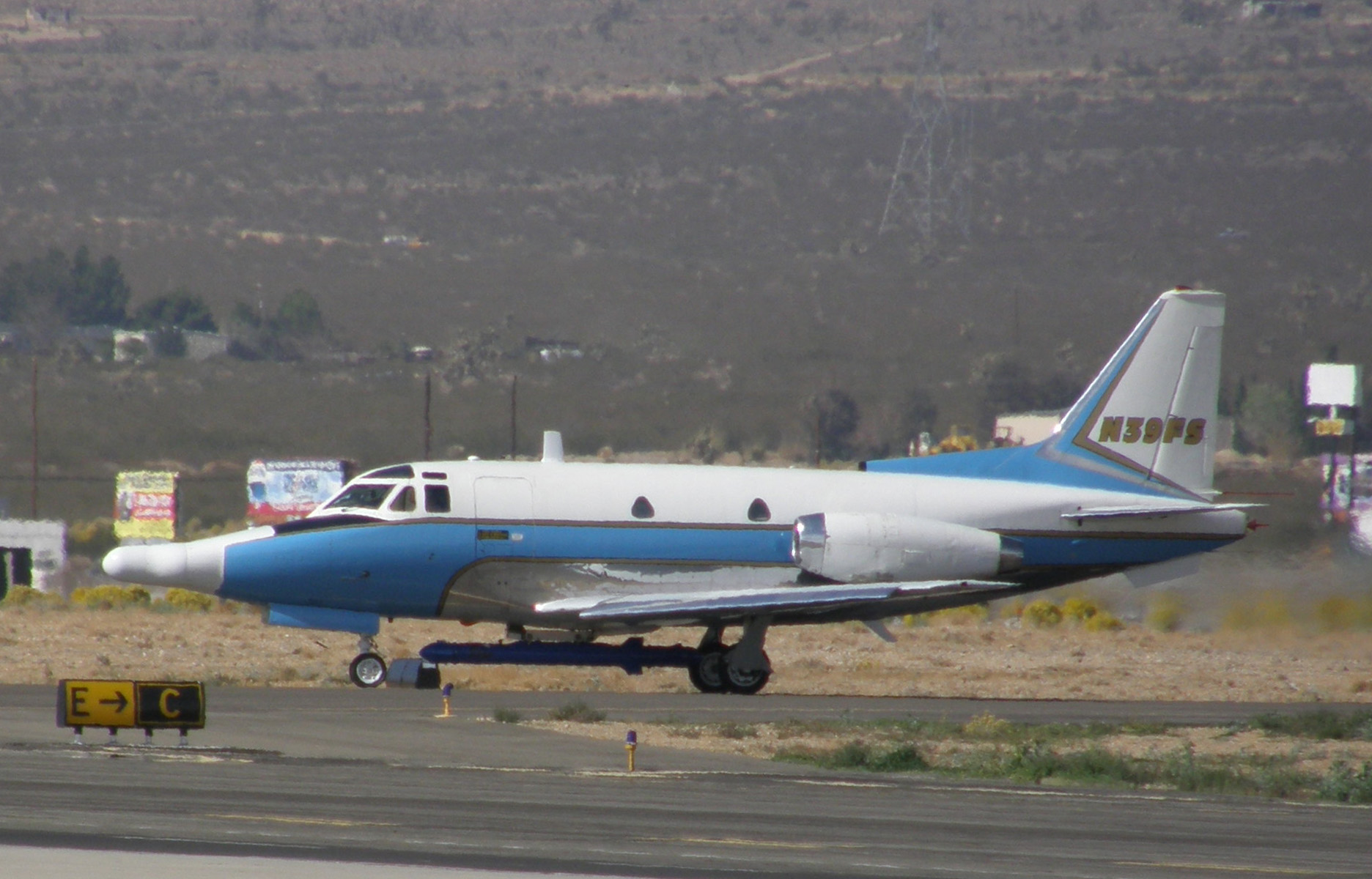
BAE Systems Flight Systems T-39A flight test aircraft at the Mojave Airport

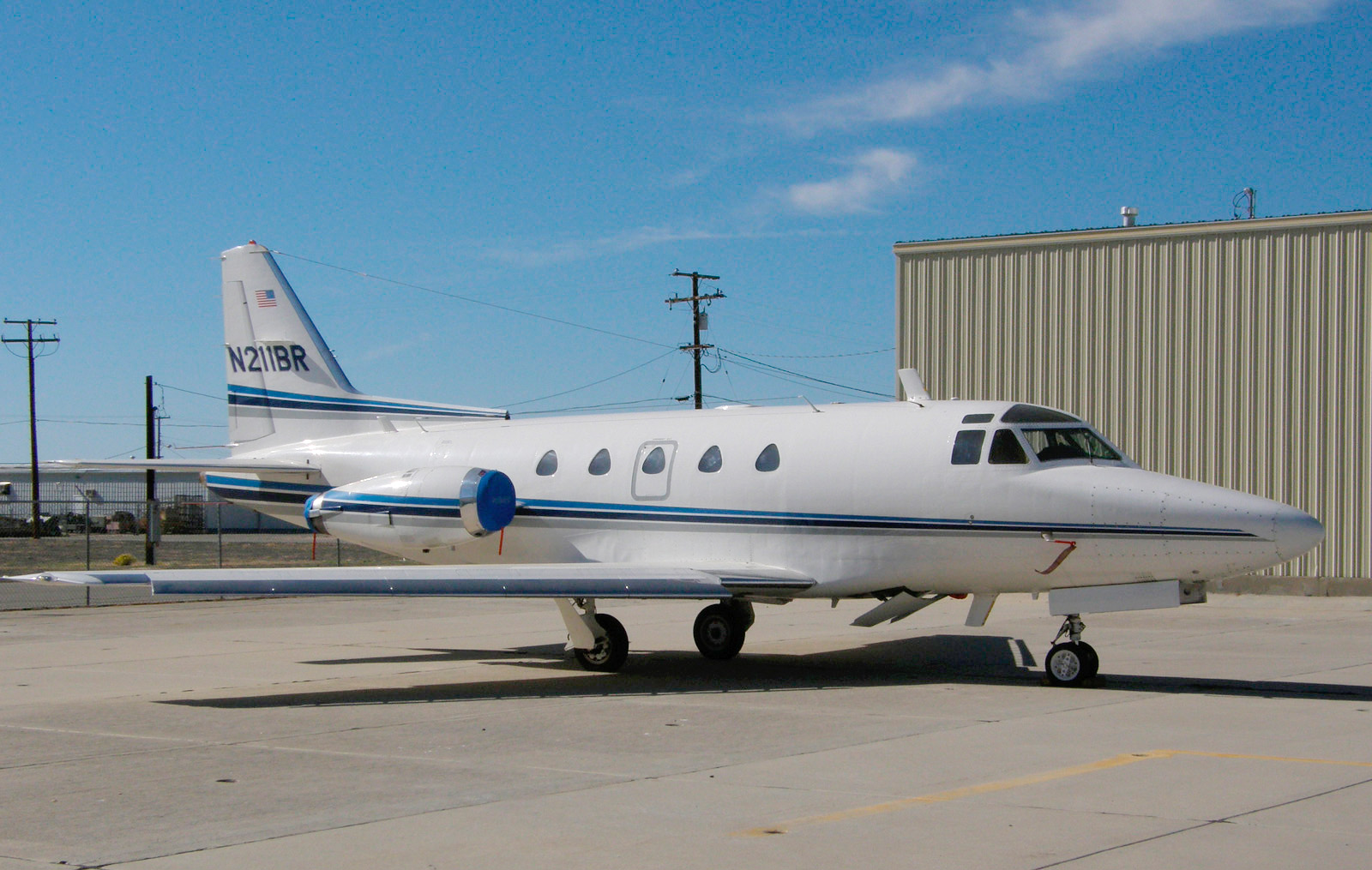
NA-265-60 Series 60 Sabreliner at NTPS, Mojave

The North American Sabreliner, later sold as the Rockwell Sabreliner, is a mid-sized business jet designed and produced by American aircraft manufacturer North American Aviation. It was named "Sabreliner" due to the similarity of the wing and tail to North American's F-86 Sabre jet fighter.

The Sabreliner was developed during the late 1950s and early 1960s. On September 16, 1958, the prototype Sabreliner made its maiden flight; it received a type certificate from the Federal Aviation Administration (FAA) in April 1963. It was offered to the United States Air Force (USAF) to fulfil its Utility Trainer Experimental (UTX) program. Introduced in 1962 under the T-39 Sabreliner designation, multiple military variants were operated by the USAF, United States Navy (USN), and United States Marine Corps (USMC) after the USAF placed an initial order in 1959. The type was deployed during the Vietnam War, replacing the Martin B-57 Canberra for transporting high-priority cargo. It was also operated as a trainer aircraft in several different capacities.

While early deliveries had been prioritised for the military, dedicated variants of the Sabreliner were produced for civilian service. Numerous ex-military aircraft have also been sold to various civil operators. Multiple high-profile figures, including US President Lyndon B. Johnson and Osama bin Laden, have been transported by the type. Due to its aerobatic capabilities, the Sabreliner has been used by multiple companies to perform inflight upset-recovery training. During the 1970s, a supercritical wing was designed for the Sabreliner and fitted to later models, as well as being available for retrofit. Production of the Sabreliner was terminated in 1981; subsequently, the Sabreliner Corporation was formed to upgrade, maintain, and support the type.

== Design and development ==
The Sabreliner was initiated by North American Aviation (NAA) as the NA-265, an in-house project, during the mid 1950s; it was promptly submitted in response to the USAF's UTX requirement, which sought combined two different roles, personnel transport and combat readiness training, into the same aircraft. Competing bids for the UTX requirement came from both Lockheed Corporation, who offered a twin-engined variant of the JetStar, and McDonnell Douglas, which proposed a four-engined aircraft that resembled a scaled-down DC-8.

In order to satisfy its intended military customers, the Sabreliner was developed to comply with military specifications for strength, performance, and flying qualities, along with additional transport category rules stipulated by the Federal Aviation Administration (FAA). Accordingly, the construction, handling, and systems are relatively heavy-duty and often had features, such as fuel heaters, that were normally absent on contemporary light jets. The Sabreliner's cockpit was both relatively wide and spacious, being provisioned with ten individual windows to provide a high level of external visibility. The cabin was relatively large for an aircraft of its class and era; a dedicated baggage area was positioned directly across from the door, permitting easy stowage and collection during boarding and disembarking. This cabin features a relatively high doorsill, which was originally implemented due to a military requirement intended to slow waterflow into the cabin in the event of a water landing. Some models were fitted with a lavatory in the aft cabin area.

The Sabreliner was furnished with a swept wing, the design of which being fairly unconventional for the era. The skin of the wing was created from milled aluminium and made use of bolts rather than rivets. The Leading-edge slats were controlled by aerodynamic forces rather than being directed by the pilot; they retract fully when the aircraft is flown at low angles of attack and gradually extend as the angle of attack is increased to increase both the lift and camber of the wing. A relatively large air brake was located on the belly just aft of the cockpit.

The flight controls were mechanically actuated via a series of cables and bellcranks; a yaw damper was not required at any altitude due to the aircraft lacking any tendency to Dutch roll. A stick pusher was also not installed, and early versions of the aircraft lack a stick shaker due to a naturally-occurring stall buffet that provides sufficient warning. In the event of a stall, the ailerons remain effective throughout. Throughout the flight envelope, the ailerons were particularly responsive, which contributed to the Sabreliner handling relatively well during crosswinds. It had relatively narrowly-spaced landing gear, ground steering was achieved via the rudder pedals, which drove the nose gear via an electrohydraulic system below 50 knots.

The prototype of the civilian version, which carried the model number NA-265, made its maiden flight on September 16, 1958. This prototype was powered by two General Electric YJ85 turbojet engines. The type received its type certificate from the FAA in April 1963. The UTX candidate, designated the T-39A, was identical in configuration to the NA-265, but when the contract was awarded and the T-39A entered production, it was powered by two Pratt & Whitney JT12A-8 turbojet engines; these proved to be both reliable and relatively affordable to overhaul.

The civilian production version, or Series 40, was slightly refined over the prototype, featuring a higher top speed and a roomier cabin. North American then stretched the design by 3 feet 2 inches (0.97 m), providing greater cabin space, and marketed it as the Series 60, which was certificated in April 1967. The cabin was made taller for the Series 70 and General Electric CF700 turbofans were installed for the Series 75A (also branded as the Series 80).

By 1973, North American had merged with Rockwell Standard under the name Rockwell International. In 1976, Rockwell contracted Raisbeck Engineering to redesign the wing of the Sabreliner series. The resulting Raisbeck Mark V wing was the first supercritical wing in service in the United States. The Mark V wing was combined with Garrett TFE731 turbofan engines, to create the Series 65. Sabreliner models 60 and 80 were retrofitted with the Mark V wing as the Series 60A (STC SA687NW) and Series 80A (STC SA847NW).

Sabreliner production came to a close in 1981. The next year, Rockwell sold its Sabreliner division to Wolsey & Co., a private equity company which formed Sabreliner Corporation, the support organization for continuing operators. Sabreliner Corporation based its operations from the same facility that had been the headquarters for Rockwell's Sabreliner division.

== Operational history ==
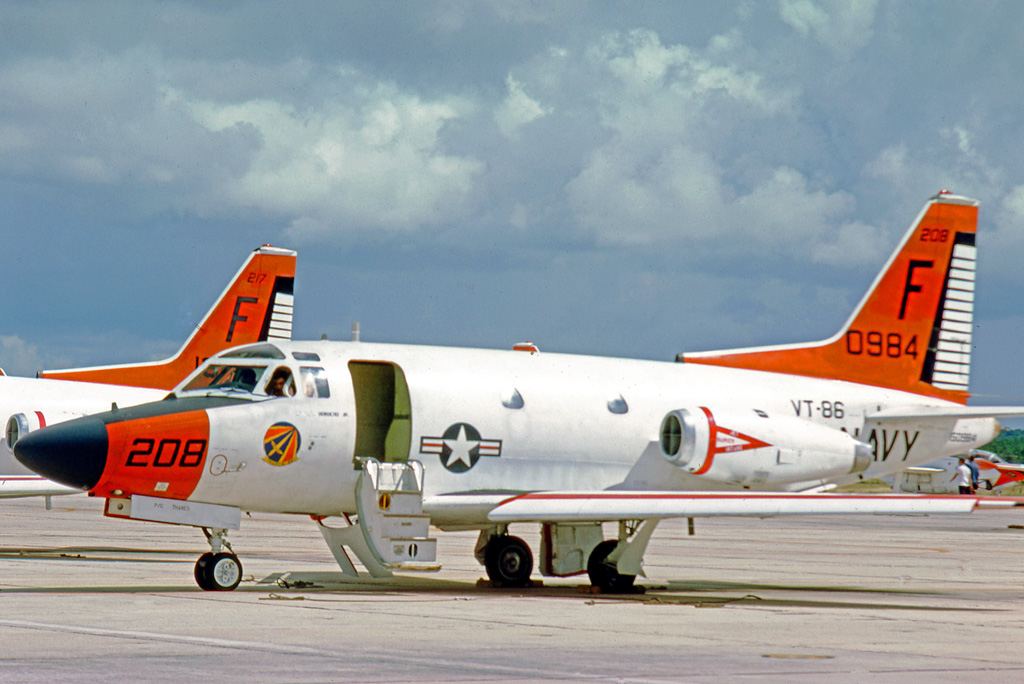
T-39D trainer of VT-86 Squadron US Navy at Pensacola NAS in 1975

T-39s were used in support of combat operations in Southeast Asia during the Vietnam War. In late 1965, T-39s replaced Martin B-57 Canberras on flights to transport high-priority cargo, such as exposed film from photoreconnaissance missions, from outlying bases to Saigon.

The original Navy version, the T3J-1, redesignated T-39D after the 1962 redesignation of US Navy/US Marine Corps/US Coast Guard aircraft, was initially fitted with the radar system from the McDonnell F3H-1 Demon all-weather fighter and used as a radar trainer for pilots of that aircraft. The T-39D aircraft was subsequently introduced into the Basic Naval Aviation Observer, later Student Naval Flight Officer program. Three versions of the T-39D were used throughout the 1960s, '70s, and '80s: one without radar for high altitude instrument navigation training and low altitude visual navigation training in the SNFO Intermediate syllabus; a second variant equipped with the APQ-126 radar from the LTV A-7 Corsair II for training primarily bombardier/navigators, reconnaissance attack navigators, and electronic countermeasures officers in attack aircraft; and a third variant with the APQ-94 radar for training pilots of the Vought F-8 Crusader.

The T-39N and T-39G are currently used in the NFO Strike and Strike Fighter syllabi in training US Navy and US Marine Corps student Naval Flight Officers, as well as various NATO/allied/coalition student navigators. Foreign students also train in the T-39 in place of the Beechcraft T-1 Jayhawk during the Intermediate Jet syllabus.

The Sabreliner requires a minimum crew of two and, depending on cabin configuration, can carry up to seven passengers (NA-265 through NA-265-40) or ten passengers (NA-265-60 and subsequent models). As a Navy flight training aircraft, it will typically fly with a pilot, one or two NFO instructors, and two to three student NFOs or student navigators/CSOs.

Being derived from the F-86, the Sabreliner is the only business jet authorised for aerobatics and is used by two California companies: Flight Research Inc. and Patriots Jet Team, for inflight upset-recovery training to reduce loss-of-control, involving full stalls, fully inverted flight, and 20-40° descents in a 2.8g envelope, within its 3g rating.

Over 800 Sabreliners were produced, of which 200 were T-39s. A number of retired military T-39s have also entered the civilian world since the military versions also carry FAA type certification. As of May 2007, 56 examples have been lost in accidents. The Series 65 was the last series run and 76 of them were produced, mostly for the private market. Monsanto has the oldest continuously operating company corporate jet division, which started with its purchase of a Sabreliner 40.

=== Al-Qaeda use ===
Between 1993 and 1994, Osama bin Laden reportedly owned and used a former USAF T-39A, which had been converted to civilian use and refurbished at Van Nuys Airport. An Egyptian pilot and bin Laden proxy, Essam al-Ridi, lawfully purchased the aircraft from a U.S. broker in California in 1992, claiming to represent wealthy Egyptians. Al Ridi reported to have personally delivered the plane to bin Laden—who was then exiled in Khartoum, Sudan—in January 1993. There, the jet was reportedly used to ferry five Al-Qaeda operatives to Kenya to agitate tribal insurgency against US peacekeeping troops in nearby Somalia; one of the passengers was allegedly senior bin Laden deputy Mohammed Atef.

More than a year later, around October 1994, the jet overran the runway in Khartoum Airport and crashed into a sand dune. The aircraft was badly damaged and subsequently abandoned due to high anticipated repair costs; both al Ridi and Al-Qaeda-trained pilot Ihab Mohammad Ali separately claimed to have been at the controls (the aircraft is fitted with dual controls). In later years, Ali testified that, in 1995, bin Laden asked him to ram the plane against that of Egyptian president Hosni Mubarak, despite the aircraft having never been repaired after the Khartoum accident.

== Variants ==
=== Civilian ===
Sabreliner
(NA-265 or NA-246) Prototype powered by two General Electric J85-GE-X turbojet engines, one built sometimes unofficially called XT-39.

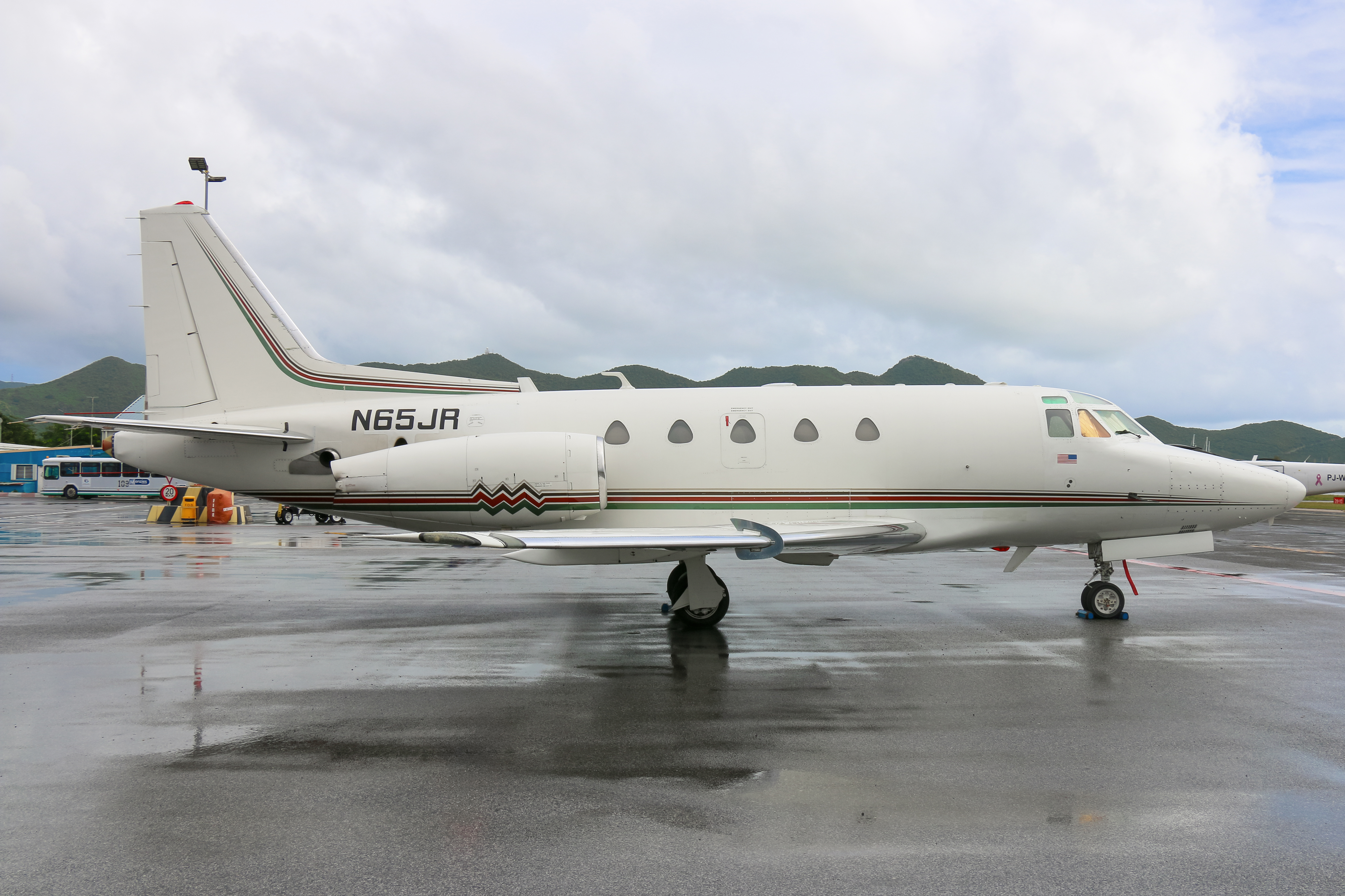
Sabreliner 65

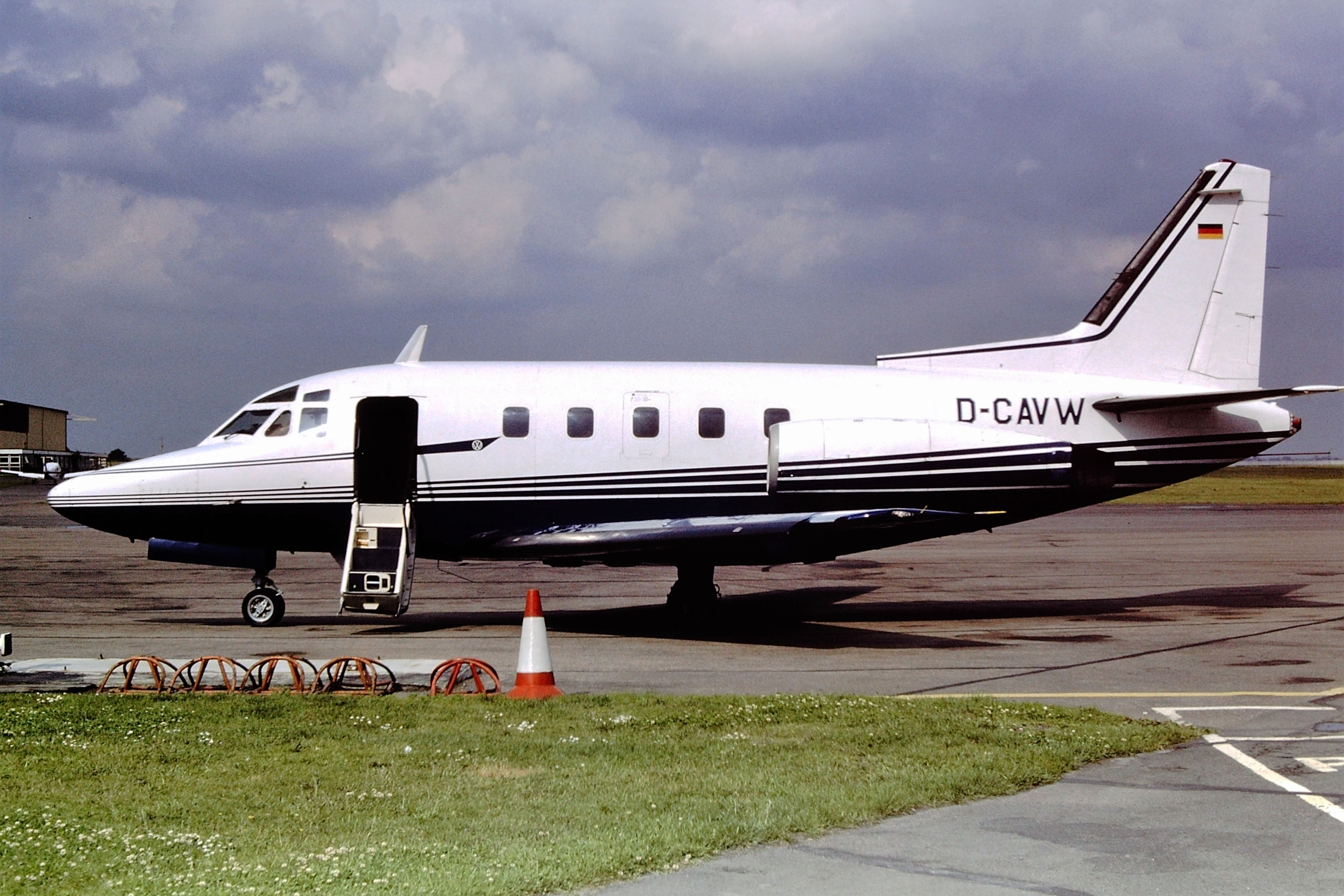
Sabreliner 75, displaying higher cabin roof than earlier variants

Sabreliner 40
(NA-265-40 or NA-282) Civil production variant for 11 passengers powered by two Pratt & Whitney JT12A-6A or -8 engines, two cabin windows each side; 65 built.
Sabreliner 40A
A Sabreliner marketing version of the Sabre 40 with lighter avionics similar to the Aero Commander, also produced by Rockwell International at the time. In addition to the lighter avionics package, the interior was redesigned for lighter construction.
Sabreliner 50
(NA-265-50 or NA-287) One built in 1964 as a Model 60 with Pratt & Whitney JT12A engines, experimental platform for radome nose cowling.
Sabreliner 60
(NA-265-60 or NA-306) Stretched Model 40 for 12 passengers with two Pratt & Whitney JT12A-8 engines, five cabin windows each side, 130 built.
Sabreliner 60A
Series 60 with Mark V super-critical wing.
Sabreliner 65
(NA-265-65 or NA-465) Based on the Series 60 with Garrett AiResearch TFE731-3R-1D engines and new Mark V super-critical wing, 76 built.
Sabreliner 75
(NA-265-70 or NA-370) Series 60A with a raised cabin roof for greater cabin headroom, two Pratt & Whitney JT12A-8 engines; nine built.
Sabreliner 75A (Sabreliner 80)
(NA-265-80 or NA-380) Sabreliner 75 powered by two General Electric CF700 turbofan engines, 66 built.
Sabreliner 80A
Series 80 with Mark V supercritical wing.

=== Military ===
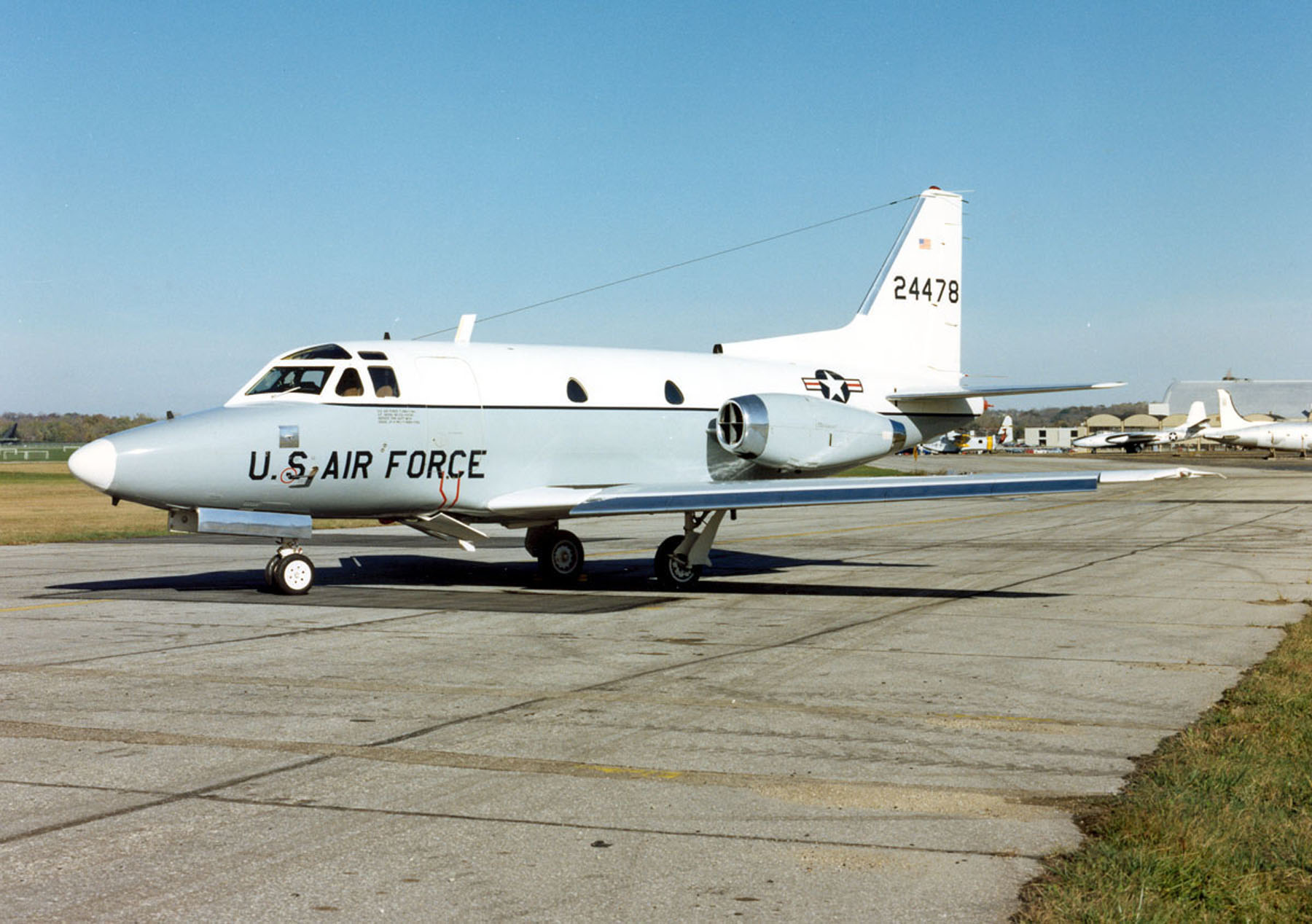
USAF T-39A

T-39A
Pilot proficiency trainer and utility transport for USAF, based on Sabreliner prototype but powered by two 3,000 lbf (13 kN) Pratt & Whitney J60-P3 engines, 143 built.
CT-39A
T-39A modified as a cargo and personnel transport, Pratt & Whitney J60-P3/-3A engines.
NT-39A
One T-39A modified for electronic systems testing.
T-39B
Radar systems trainer for USAF, fitted with avionics of the Republic F-105D Thunderchief fighter bomber (including R-14 NASARR main radar and AN/APN-131 doppler radar) and with stations for three trainees, six built.
T-39C
Proposed radar systems trainer for USAF fitted with avionics of McDonnell F-101B Voodoo all-weather interceptor. Unbuilt.
T3J-1
Pre-production designation for T-39D.
T-39D
Radar systems trainer for USN, 1962 redesignation of T3J-1, Pratt & Whitney J60-P3 engines, 42 delivered from 1963, equipped with AN/APQ-94 radar for radar intercept officer training and the AN/APQ-126 radar for bombardier/navigator training.
CT-39E
USN cargo/transport version, with JT12A-8 engines, originally designated VT-39E, seven second-hand aircraft.
T-39F
Electronic warfare crew training conversion of the T-39A for USAF training of F-105G "Wild Weasel" crews.
CT-39G
USN cargo/transport version based on the stretched fuselage Sabreliner 60, Pratt & Whitney JT12A engines equipped with thrust reversers, 13 bought.
T-39G
CT-39G modified for the Undergraduate Flight Officer Training program. Derivative of NA-265-60.

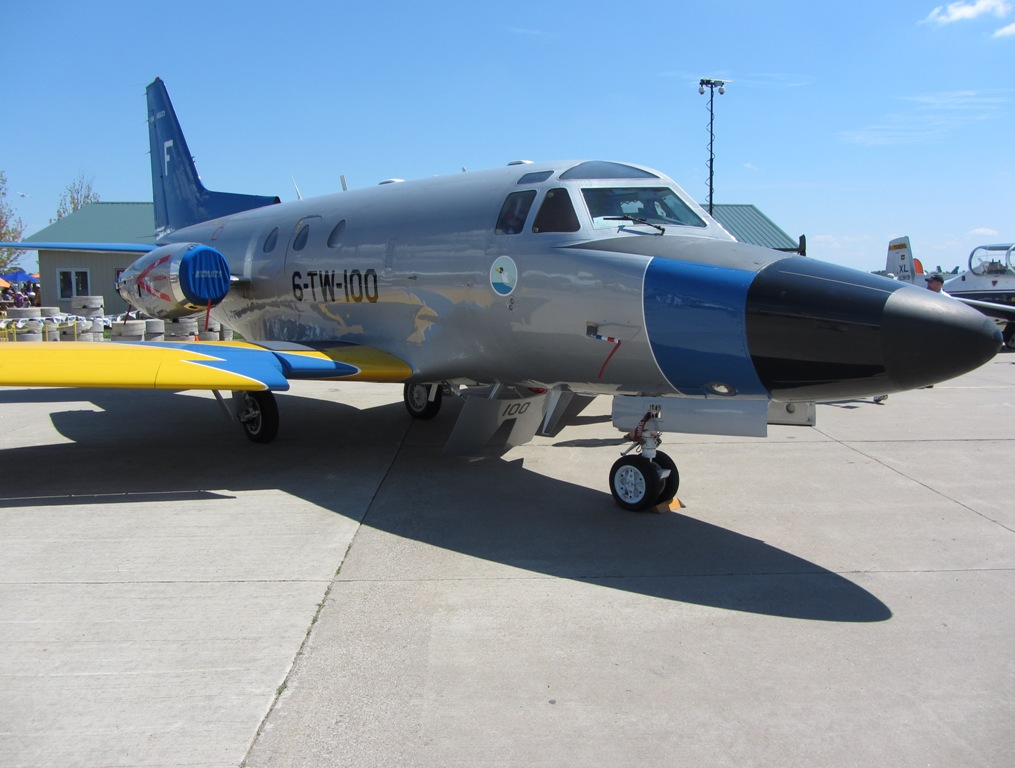
U.S. Navy T-39N in Centennial of Naval Aviation commemorative paint scheme in 2011.

T-39N
Navy trainer for the Undergraduate Flight Officer Training program. Derivative of NA-265-40.

== Operators ==
Argentina

- Argentine Air Force (One series 75A)
- Argentine Army Aviation (One series 75A)

Bolivia

- Bolivian Air Force (One series 65 FAB-005 used as military and Presidential transport)

Ecuador

- Ecuadorian Air Force

Mexico

- Mexican Air Force
- Mexican Navy

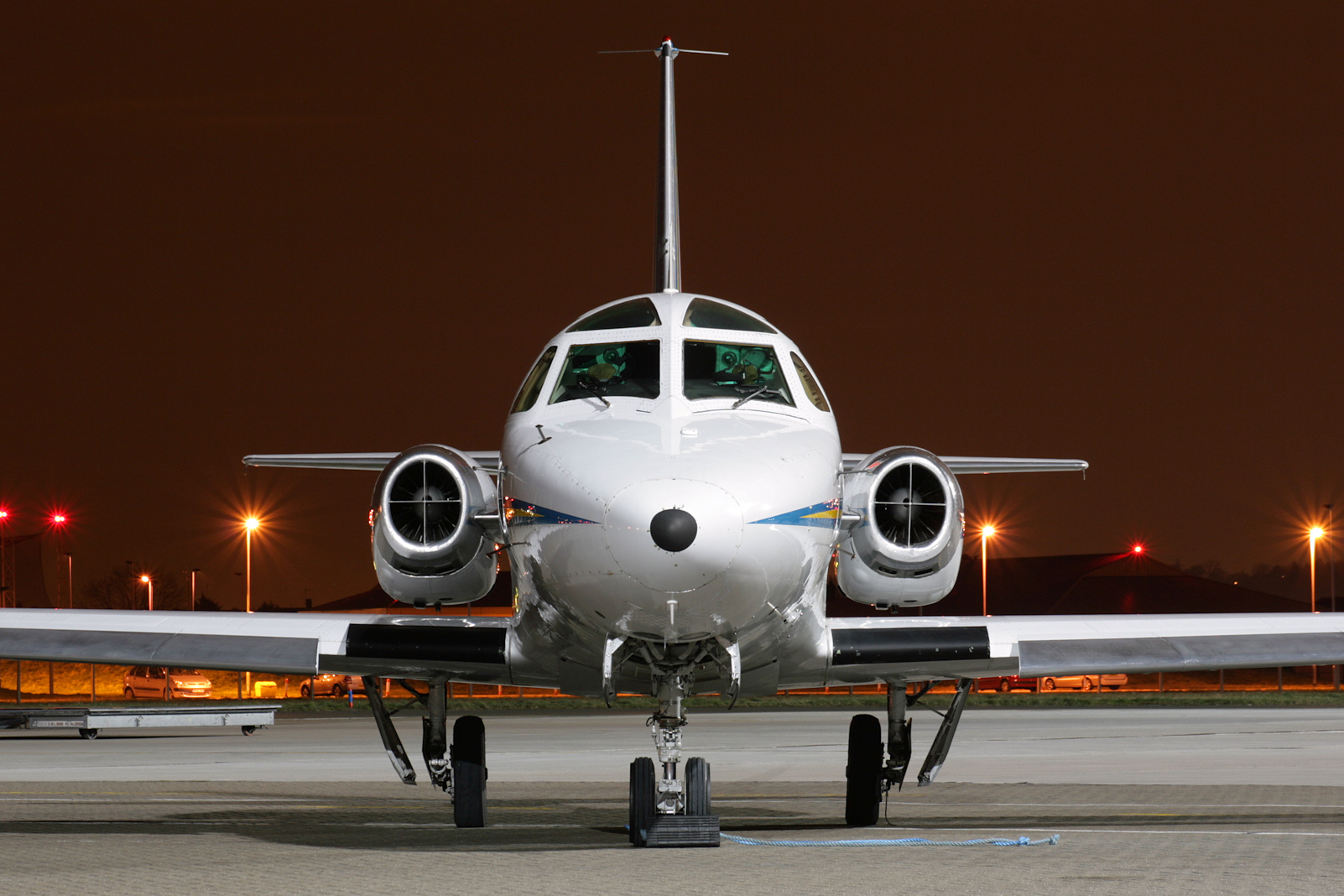
Swedish Air Force Sabreliner 40 at RAF Northolt in 2013

Sweden

- Swedish Air Force (One series 65, local designation Tp 86)

United States

- United States Air Force (149 with T-39 designations)
- United States Navy (51 with T-39 designations)
- BAE Systems Inc. (T-39A)
- Federal Aviation Administration (Series 80)
- National Test Pilot School
- Patriots Jet Team (Series 60/60SC for Aircraft upset Prevention and Recovery Training)
- Evergreen International Airlines

== Accidents and incidents ==
As of December 2019, there have been 62 recorded incidents and accidents involving the Sabreliner, resulting in 153 deaths. Listed below are a select few of the most notable ones.

- 28 January 1964: a USAF T-39 Sabreliner flying from West Germany on a training mission crosses into East German airspace and is shot down by a Soviet Mikoyan-Gurevich MiG-19 near Vogelsberg, killing all three on board.
- 13 April 1973: a Sabreliner NA-265-60 operated by Continental Airlines, N743R, crashes after takeoff at Montrose Airport following the uncommanded deployment of the port-side thrust reverser. The two pilots, the only occupants of the aircraft, are killed and the aircraft is destroyed by impact forces and a post-impact fire.
- 9 February 1974: a USAF T-39A Sabreliner reports landing gear problems while taking off from Peterson Air Force Base in Colorado Springs, Colorado, and a USAF Boeing NKC-135 flying from Seattle to Albuquerque meets it to conduct an airborne visual inspection of its landing gear at an altitude of 23,000 ft (7,000 m). The T-39 strikes the NKC-135's tail and crashes near Colorado Springs, killing all seven people aboard. The NKC-135 sustains only minor damage and lands safely at Kirtland Air Force Base in Albuquerque.
- 20 April 1985: a USAF CT-39A, 62-4496, overruns the runway at Wilkes-Barre/Scranton International Airport due to brake failure on landing. The aircraft coasts down an embankment and burns, killing all five persons aboard, including General Jerome F. O'Malley, Commander, Tactical Air Command.
- 5 July 2007: a CT-39A cargo aircraft operated by Mexican carrier Jett Paqueteria, XA-TFL, overruns Runway 02 at Culiacán International Airport after the pilots are unable to lift off and initiate a rejected takeoff. The aircraft crashes into vehicles on a nearby highway, killing all three crew members on the Sabreliner and seven persons on the ground. The accident is attributed to possible horizontal stabilizer failure, poor aircrew training and crew resource management, a failure to follow proper procedures, and crew pressure to depart before the airfield was to be temporarily closed for a presidential visit.
- 16 August 2015: a private Sabreliner NA265-60SC, N442RM, collides with a Cessna 172M, N1285U, on approach to Brown Field Municipal Airport in California, killing the five people on board the two aircraft. The cause was found to be air traffic control (ATC) error. This accident, together with another fatal 2015 mid-air collision under similar circumstances, prompts the U.S. National Transportation Safety Board to recommend that the FAA more strongly emphasize scenario-based training for controllers.

== Aircraft on display ==
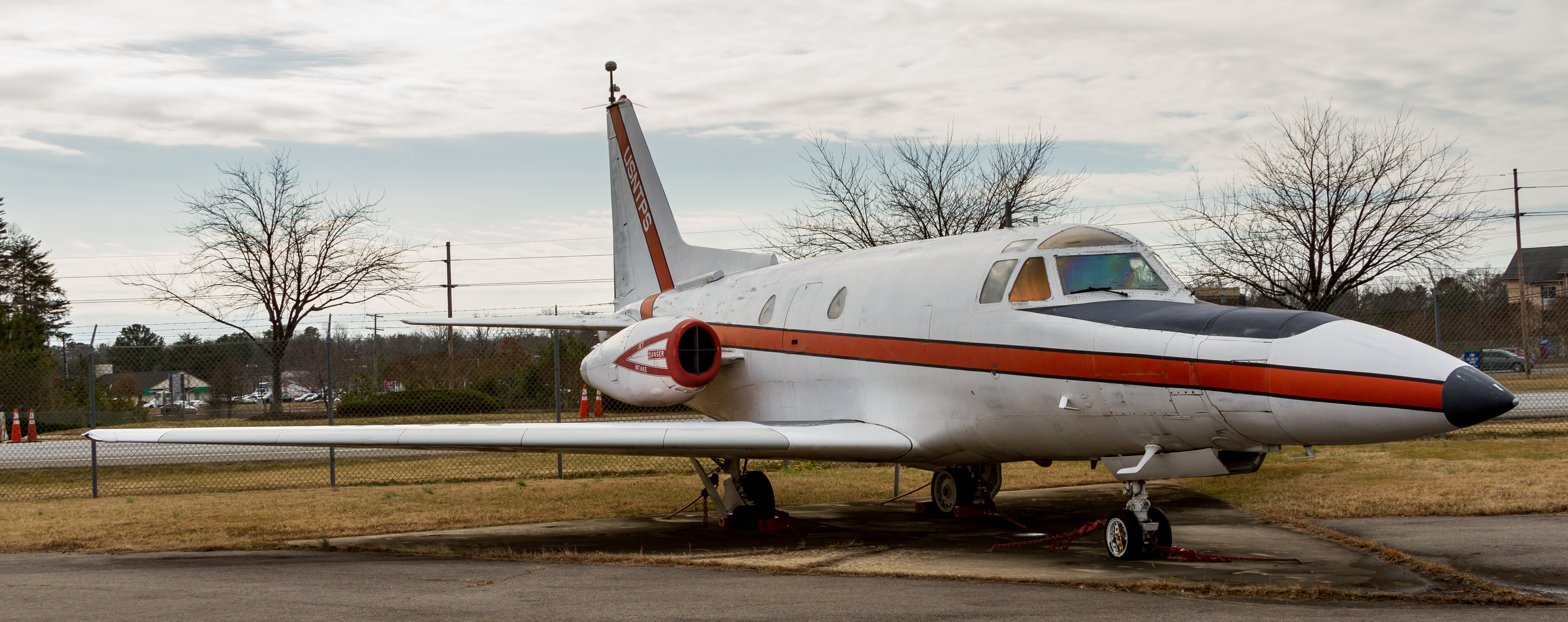
T-39D display at the Patuxent River Naval Air Museum

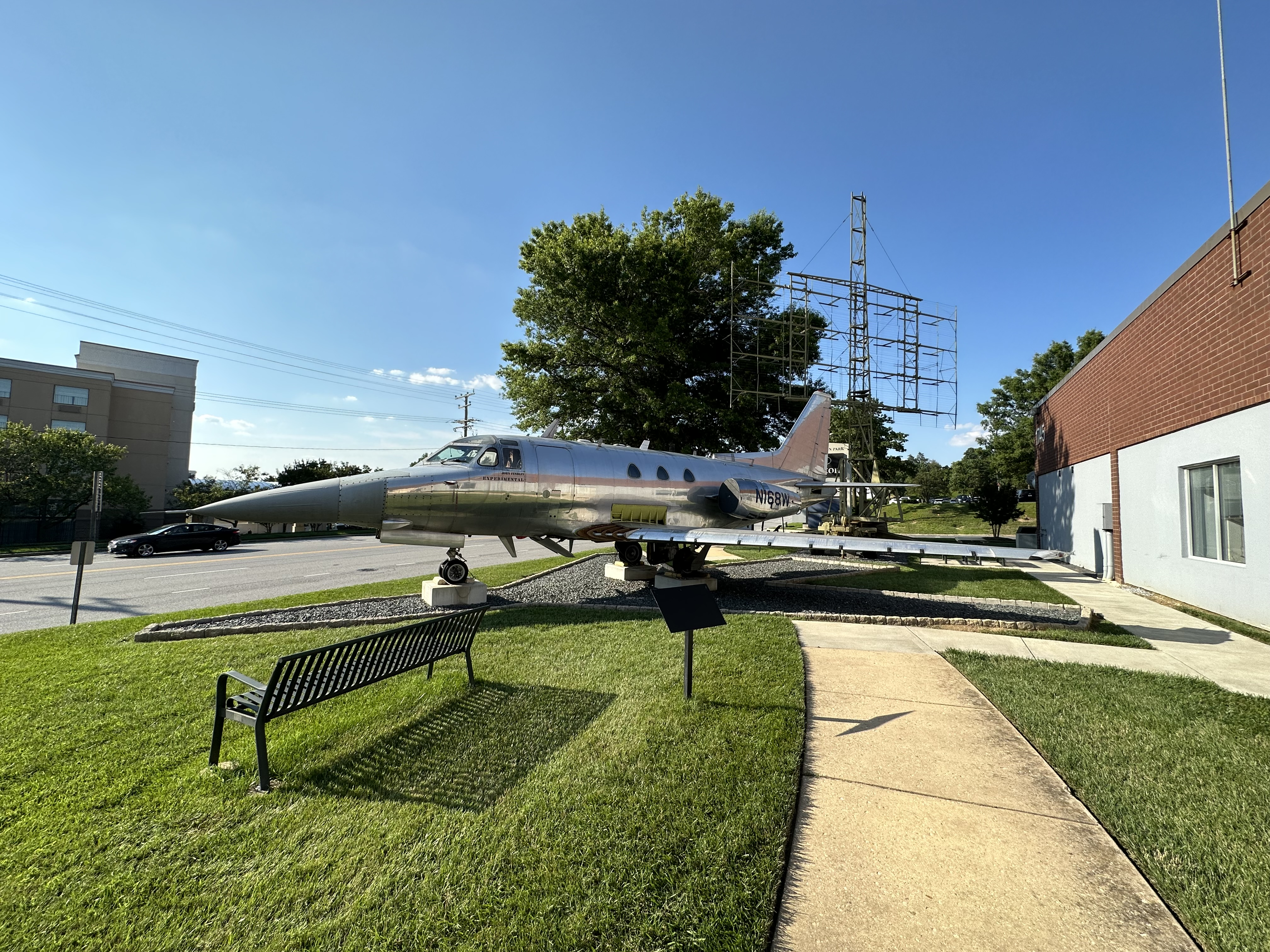
Sabreliner on display at National Electronics Museum, used as test bed for development of radars

- CT-39A, AF Ser. No. 60-3495, on pylon display at Scott Air Force Base, Illinois
- T-39A, AF Ser. No. 61-0634, Dyess Linear Air Park, Dyess Air Force Base, Texas
- CT-39A, AF Ser. No. 61-0650, Snohomish County Airport/Paine Field, Washington
- CT-39A, AF Ser. No. 62-4449, Pima Air and Space Museum, adjacent to Davis-Monthan Air Force Base, Tucson, Arizona
- CT-39A, AF Ser. No. 62-4461, at the Museum of Aviation, Robins Air Force Base, Warner Robins, Georgia
- CT-39A, AF Ser. No. 62-4462, at Travis Air Force Base Heritage Center / Jimmy Doolittle Air & Space Museum, Travis Air Force Base, Fairfield, California
- CT-39A, AF Ser. No. 62-4465, at March Field Air Museum, March Air Reserve Base (former March Air Force Base), Riverside, California
- CT-39A, AF Ser. No. 62-4478, at the Presidential Gallery of the National Museum of the United States Air Force, Wright-Patterson Air Force Base, Ohio
- CT-39A, AF Ser. No. 62-4487, at the Strategic Air Command & Aerospace Museum, Ashland, Nebraska
- T-39D, BuNo 150985, Sherman Field area, Naval Air Station Pensacola, Florida
- T-39D, BuNo 150992 The Naval Museum of Armament & Technology, Ridgecrest, CA
- T-39D, BuNo 151338, Southern Museum of Flight, Birmingham-Shuttlesworth International Airport, Birmingham, Alabama
- T–39D, BuNo 150987, Patuxent River Naval Air Museum, Lexington Park, Maryland
- T-39E, AF Ser. No. undetermined, Air Classics Museum of Aviation, Aurora Municipal Airport, Sugar Grove, Illinois
- CT-39G, BuNo 160056, National Naval Aviation Museum, Naval Air Station Pensacola, Florida
- Sabreliner 40 at City Museum in St. Louis, Missouri. Two are displayed as interactive works of art.
- Sabreliner 40 at National Electronics Museum in Linthicum, Maryland. Tail #N168W was a flying test bed used by Northrop Grumman’s Mission Systems Flight Test Facility.
- Sabreliner 50 at Evergreen Aviation & Space Museum in McMinnville, Oregon. It was donated to the museum in January 2013

== Specifications (T3J-1/T-39D) ==
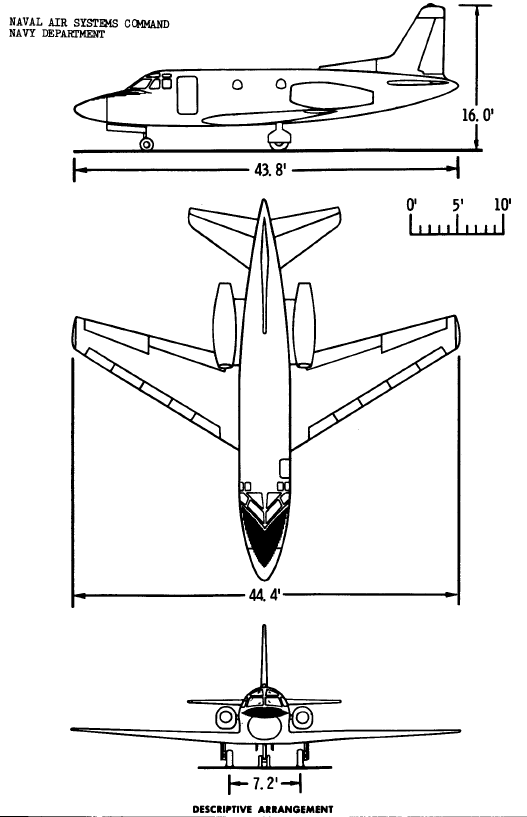
Three-view of the Navy's T-39N version

Data from T-39 Sabreliner on Boeing History site

General characteristics

- Crew: four–five
- Capacity: five–seven passengers
- Length: 44 ft 0 in (13.41 m)
- Wingspan: 44 ft 6 in (13.56 m)
- Height: 16 ft 0 in (4.88 m)
- Wing area: 342.1 sq ft (31.79 m^{2})
- Empty weight: 9,257 lb (4,199 kg)
- Max takeoff weight: 17,760 lb (8,056 kg)
- Powerplant: 2 × Pratt & Whitney J60-P-3 turbojet, 3,000 lbf (13 kN) thrust each

Performance

- Maximum speed: 478 kn (550 mph, 885 km/h)
- Cruise speed: 435 kn (500 mph, 800 km/h)
- Range: 2,170 nmi (2,500 mi, 4,020 km)
- Service ceiling: 40,000 ft (12,200 m)
- Thrust/weight: 0.338

== See also ==
Aircraft of comparable role, configuration, and era

- British Aerospace 125
- IAI Westwind
- Raytheon T-1 Jayhawk
