= Weißensee, Thuringia =

Weißensee
- Town
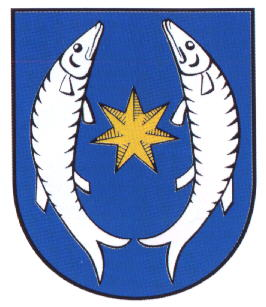
- Coat of arms

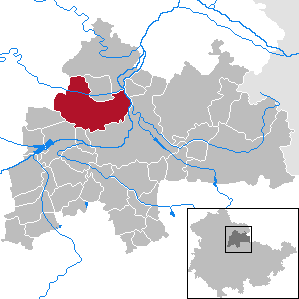
- Location of Weißensee within Sömmerda district
- Interactive map of Weißensee
- Location within Germany Location within Thuringia
- Coordinates: 51°11′N 11°4′E
- Country: Germany
- State: Thuringia
- District: Sömmerda

Government
  - Mayor (2023–29): Daniel Ecke

Area
  - Total: 55.33 km^{2} (21.36 sq mi)
- Elevation: 143 m (469 ft)

Population (2025-12-31)
  - Total: 3,598
  - Density: 65.03/km^{2} (168.4/sq mi)
- Time zone: UTC+01:00 (CET)
  - Summer (DST): UTC+02:00 (CEST)
- Postal codes: 99631
- Dialling codes: 036374
- Vehicle registration: SÖM
- Website: www.weissensee.de

Weißensee (German pronunciation: [ˈvaɪsn̩ˌzeː], lit. 'white lake') is a town in the district of Sömmerda, in Thuringia, Germany. It is situated 6 km northwest of Sömmerda, and 25 km north of Erfurt. The former municipality Herrnschwende was merged into Weißensee in January 2019.

== History ==
Weissensee is one of a very few towns which was actually planned in the Middle Ages. Founded in the second half of the 12th century by Jutta Claricia, Landgravine of Thuringia and sister of Emperor Frederick I, it gained market rights in 1198 and city rights in 1265. Due to its excellent strategic position between two lakes – from which the town takes its name – and a ridge of hills, Weissensee rapidly became a very important trade centre, especially for fish and woad.

Some notable figures lived on the Runneburg and in 1446 William III, Landgrave of Thuringia adopted the first Thuringian constitution. During the Renaissance the town became less important and the two lakes were drained. But after the Congress of Vienna in 1814 it was awarded to Prussia and underwent a revival as district capital.

Weissensee is famous for its medieval castle, one of the largest in Thuringia, and for its annual Bierfest.

== Climate ==
Since October 2017, there has been a private weather station in Weißensee, whose data measured at an altitude of 143 m above sea level are permanently available on the Internet. A maximum temperature of 38.2 °C was measured there on 20 July 2022, and a minimum temperature of -24.4 °C on 10 February 2021.

== Notable people ==
- Johann Christian Daniel von Schreber (1739–1810), naturalist, born in Weißensee
