= Kindelbrück =

- Municipality
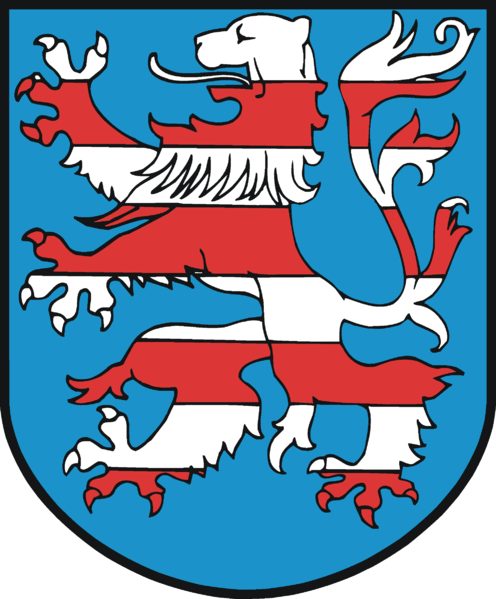
- Coat of arms

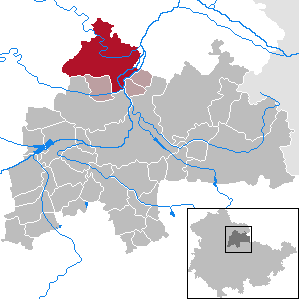
- Location of Kindelbrück within Sömmerda district
- Interactive map of Kindelbrück
- Location within Germany Location within Thuringia
- Coordinates: 51°16′N 11°5′E
- Country: Germany
- State: Thuringia
- District: Sömmerda
- Municipal assoc.: Kindelbrück

Government
  - Mayor (2019–25): Roman Zachar

Area
  - Total: 64.65 km^{2} (24.96 sq mi)
- Elevation: 140 m (460 ft)

Population (2025-12-31)
  - Total: 3,823
  - Density: 59.13/km^{2} (153.2/sq mi)
- Time zone: UTC+01:00 (CET)
  - Summer (DST): UTC+02:00 (CEST)
- Postal codes: 99638
- Dialling codes: 036375
- Vehicle registration: SÖM
- Website: www.vg-kindelbrueck.de

Kindelbrück (German: [ˈkɪndl̩ˌbʁʏk]) is a municipality in the district of Sömmerda, in Thuringia, Germany. It is situated on the river Wipper, 12 km north of Sömmerda. The former municipalities Bilzingsleben, Frömmstedt and Kannawurf were merged into Kindelbrück in January 2019. In January 2023 Kindelbrück absorbed the former municipality Riethgen.

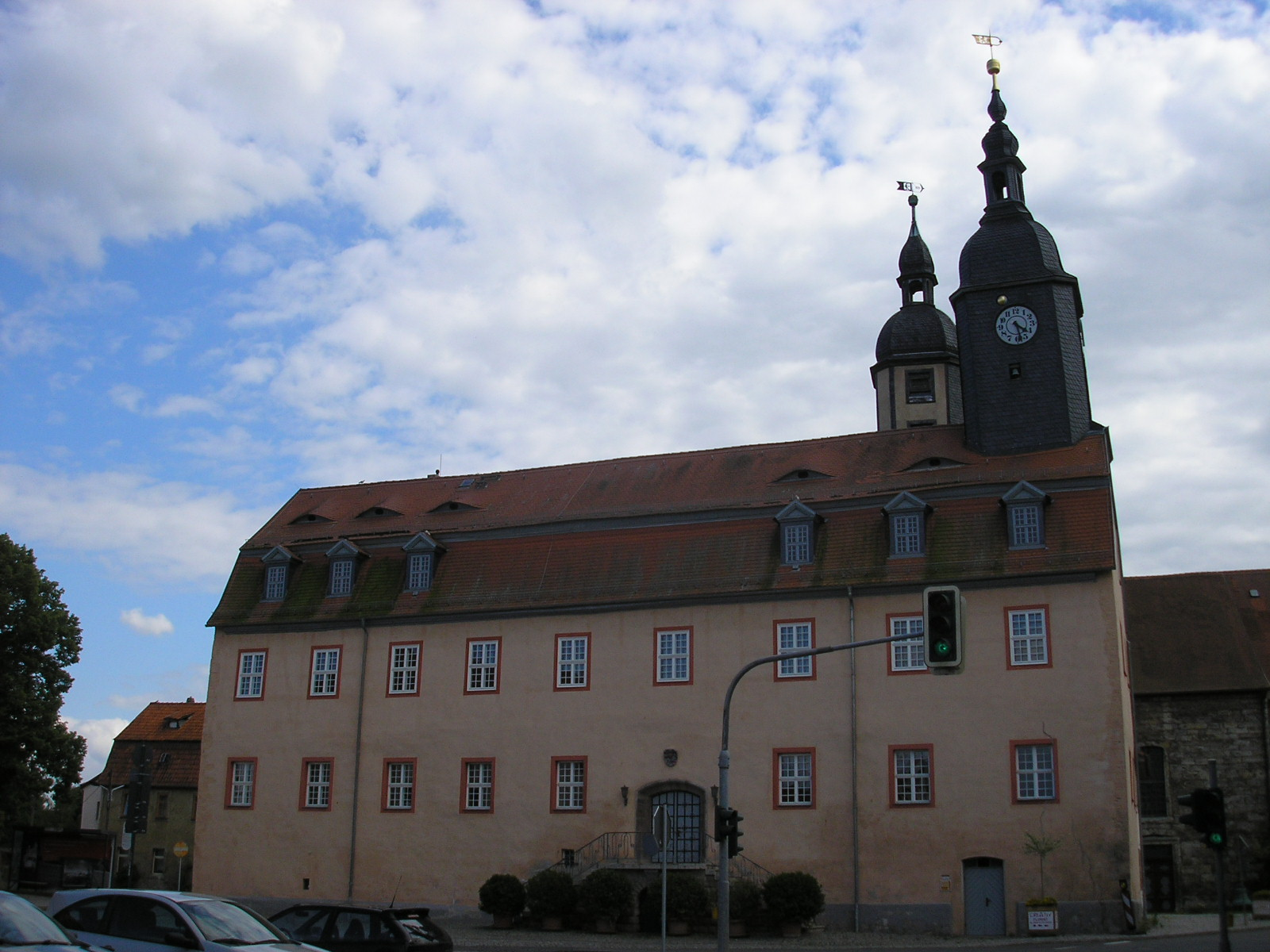
Town hall Kindelbrück

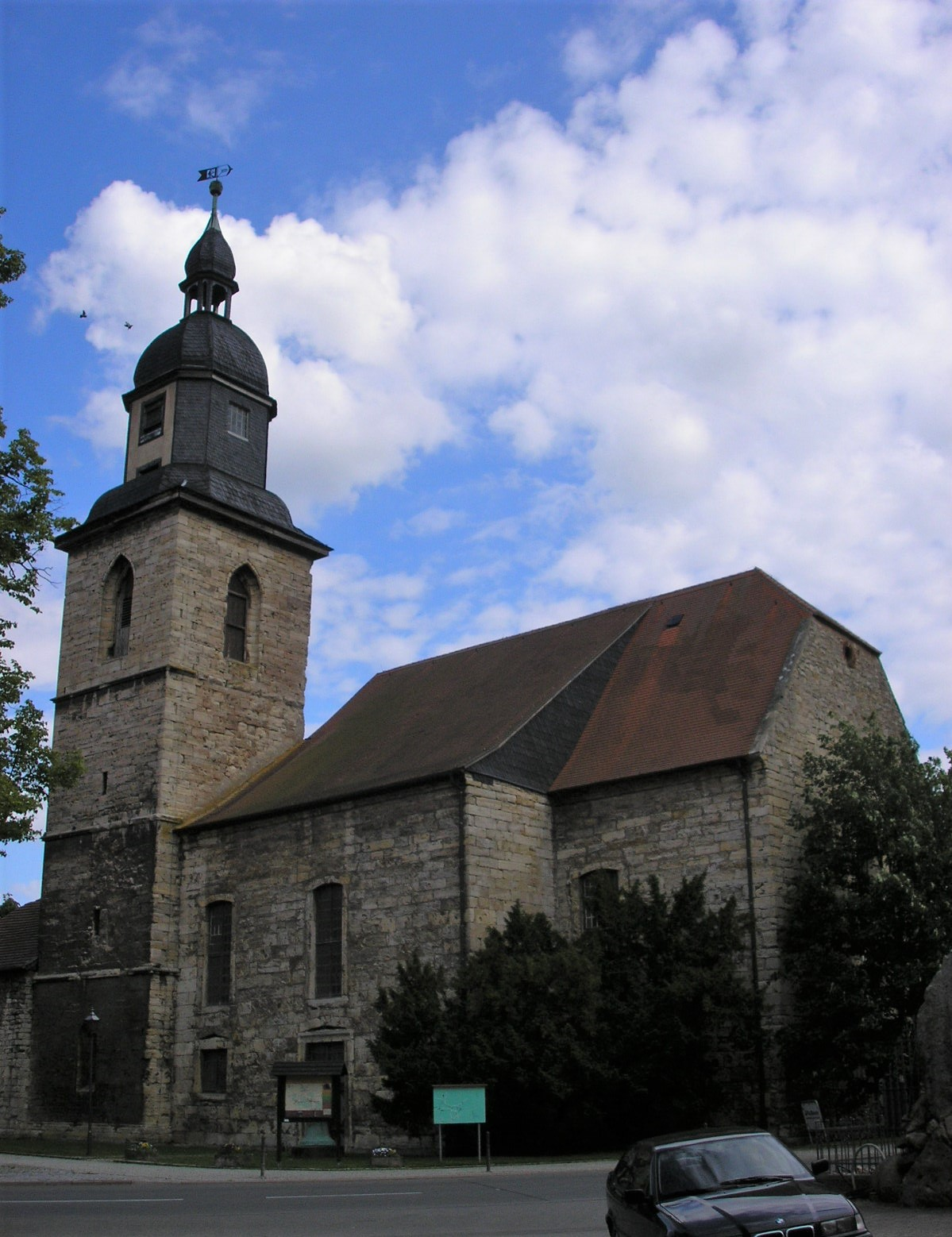
Church Kindelbrück

== Inhabitants ==
Historical population
Year	Pop.	±% p.a.
1994	2,207	—
1998	2,081	−1.46%
2000	2,024	−1.38%
2005	1,918	−1.07%
2010	1,734	−2.00%
2012	1,829	+2.70%
2014	1,958	+3.47%
Source: Statistical Office of Thuringia
