= Büchel, Thuringia =

Büchel
- Municipality
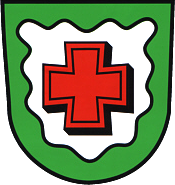
- Coat of arms

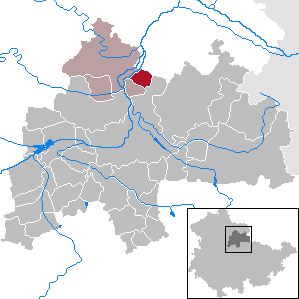
- Location of Büchel within Sömmerda district
- Interactive map of Büchel
- Location within Germany Location within Thuringia
- Coordinates: 51°15′N 11°9′E
- Country: Germany
- State: Thuringia
- District: Sömmerda
- Municipal assoc.: Kindelbrück

Government
  - Mayor (2020–26): Beate Setzepfandt

Area
  - Total: 6.58 km^{2} (2.54 sq mi)
- Elevation: 130 m (430 ft)

Population (2025-12-31)
  - Total: 226
  - Density: 34.3/km^{2} (89.0/sq mi)
- Time zone: UTC+01:00 (CET)
  - Summer (DST): UTC+02:00 (CEST)
- Postal codes: 99638
- Dialling codes: 036375
- Vehicle registration: SÖM
- Website: www.buechelonline.de

Büchel (German pronunciation: [ˈbyːçl̩]) is a municipality in the Sömmerda district of Thuringia, Germany.
