= Walschleben =

- Municipality
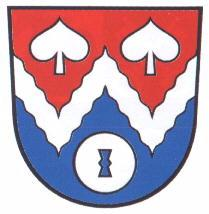
- Coat of arms

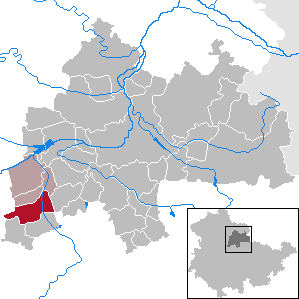
- Location of Walschleben within Sömmerda district
- Interactive map of Walschleben
- Location within Germany Location within Thuringia
- Coordinates: 51°4′0″N 10°56′10″E
- Country: Germany
- State: Thuringia
- District: Sömmerda
- Municipal assoc.: Gera-Aue

Government
  - Mayor (2022–28): Marcel Bube (SPD)

Area
  - Total: 16.79 km^{2} (6.48 sq mi)
- Elevation: 160 m (520 ft)

Population (2025-12-31)
  - Total: 1,768
  - Density: 105.3/km^{2} (272.7/sq mi)
- Time zone: UTC+01:00 (CET)
  - Summer (DST): UTC+02:00 (CEST)
- Postal codes: 99189
- Dialling codes: 036201
- Vehicle registration: SÖM
- Website: www.walschleben.de

Walschleben is a municipality in the Sömmerda district of Thuringia, Germany.
