= Andisleben =

- Municipality
- Coat of arms

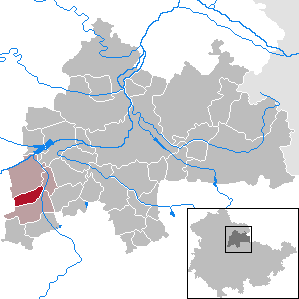
- Location of Andisleben within Sömmerda district
- Interactive map of Andisleben
- Location within Germany Location within Thuringia
- Coordinates: 51°4′57″N 10°55′40″E
- Country: Germany
- State: Thuringia
- District: Sömmerda
- Municipal assoc.: Gera-Aue

Government
  - Mayor (2022–28): Hans Vollrath (SPD)

Area
  - Total: 6.81 km^{2} (2.63 sq mi)
- Elevation: 155 m (509 ft)

Population (2025-12-31)
  - Total: 600
  - Density: 88/km^{2} (230/sq mi)
- Time zone: UTC+01:00 (CET)
  - Summer (DST): UTC+02:00 (CEST)
- Postal codes: 99189
- Dialling codes: 036201
- Vehicle registration: SÖM
- Website: www.andisleben.de

Andisleben is a municipality in the Sömmerda district of Thuringia, Germany.
