= Straußfurt (Verwaltungsgemeinschaft) =

Municipal association in Thuringia, Germany

- Verwaltungsgemeinschaft
- Map of Sömmerda highlighting Straußfurt
- Interactive map of Straußfurt
- Location within Germany Location within Thuringia
- Coordinates: 51°10′N 10°59′E
- Country: Germany
- State: Thuringia
- District: Sömmerda
- Seat: Straußfurt
- Subdivisions: 7 municipalities

Area
  - Total: 95.63 km^{2} (36.92 sq mi)

Population (2025-12-31)
  - Total: 6,536
  - Density: 68.35/km^{2} (177.0/sq mi)
- Time zone: UTC+01:00 (CET)
  - Summer (DST): UTC+02:00 (CEST)
- Website: www.vgstraussfurt.de

Straußfurt is a Verwaltungsgemeinschaft ("collective municipality") in the district of Sömmerda, in Thuringia, Germany. The seat of the Verwaltungsgemeinschaft is in Straußfurt.

The Verwaltungsgemeinschaft Straußfurt consists of the following municipalities:

1. Gangloffsömmern
2. Haßleben
3. Riethnordhausen
4. Schwerstedt
5. Straußfurt
6. Werningshausen
7. Wundersleben
