= Wundersleben =

- Municipality
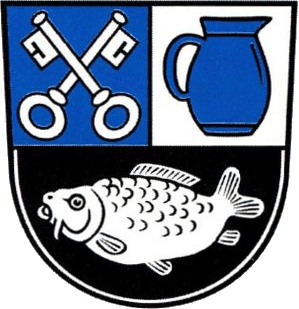
- Coat of arms

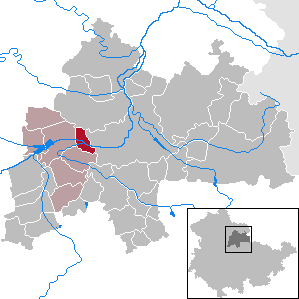
- Location of Wundersleben within Sömmerda district
- Interactive map of Wundersleben
- Location within Germany Location within Thuringia
- Coordinates: 51°9′N 11°2′E
- Country: Germany
- State: Thuringia
- District: Sömmerda
- Municipal assoc.: Straußfurt

Government
  - Mayor (2022–28): Thomas Frey

Area
  - Total: 6.85 km^{2} (2.64 sq mi)
- Elevation: 139 m (456 ft)

Population (2025-12-31)
  - Total: 617
  - Density: 90.1/km^{2} (233/sq mi)
- Time zone: UTC+01:00 (CET)
  - Summer (DST): UTC+02:00 (CEST)
- Postal codes: 99610
- Dialling codes: 036376
- Vehicle registration: SÖM
- Website: www.vgstraussfurt.de

Wundersleben is a municipality in the Sömmerda district of Thuringia, Germany. Wundersleben means "life of miracles", or "miracles in life".
