= Schwerstedt, Sömmerda =

Schwerstedt
- Municipality
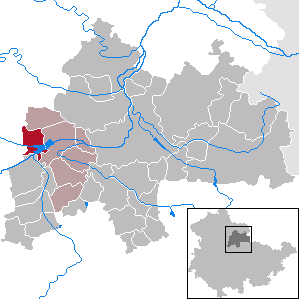
- Location of Schwerstedt within Sömmerda district
- Interactive map of Schwerstedt
- Location within Germany Location within Thuringia
- Coordinates: 51°8′N 10°55′E
- Country: Germany
- State: Thuringia
- District: Sömmerda
- Municipal assoc.: Straußfurt

Government
  - Mayor (2022–28): Thomas Wagner

Area
  - Total: 12.64 km^{2} (4.88 sq mi)
- Elevation: 155 m (509 ft)

Population (2025-12-31)
  - Total: 538
  - Density: 42.6/km^{2} (110/sq mi)
- Time zone: UTC+01:00 (CET)
  - Summer (DST): UTC+02:00 (CEST)
- Postal codes: 99634
- Dialling codes: 036376
- Vehicle registration: SÖM
- Website: www.vg-straussfurt.de

Schwerstedt (German pronunciation: [ˈʃveːɐ̯ʃtɛt]) is a municipality in the Sömmerda district of Thuringia, Germany.
