= Essam al-Ridi =

A veteran of the Soviet invasion of Afghanistan, Essam al-Ridi was an American who was tasked to purchase a light aircraft by Osama bin Laden in 1993; but fled after accidentally crashing the plane into a sand dune.

== Life ==
Born in Egypt, al-Ridi moved to the United States and settled down in Texas where he took flight lessons. Eventually he became a flight instructor himself, teaching at the Ed Boardman Aviation School.

In 1982, he went to repel the Soviet invasion of Afghanistan, becoming close colleagues with Osama bin Laden. He participated in the Battle of Jaji, but claimed that Arab claims of victory disillusioned him, and later returned to the United States.

== Sabrejet incident ==
When al-Qaeda was moving into the Sudan in 1993, bin Laden asked al-Ridi, then living in Texas, to buy a light aircraft to ferry FIM-92 Stinger missiles and other materiel the group had acquired in Afghanistan. With $250,000, al-Ridi purchased a 1960s Sabre-40 jet from the 309th Aerospace Maintenance and Regeneration Group in Arizona.

Since the plane had a range of only 1,500 miles, al-Ridi was forced to make a seven-leg journey to deliver the plane, flying to Sault Sainte Marie, then to Frobisher Bay where -65 weather cracked a windshield and burst the hydraulics, causing him to lose a week repairing the aircraft. Finally he embarked to Iceland, through Europe and finally arriving in Cairo, before embarking on the final leg of his trip.

A year and a half after delivering the plane, al-Ridi was called back to Khartoum, where he met with Ihab Ali Nawawi, and was informed that improper maintenance made the plane inoperable. Wadi el-Hage requested that the pair fix the aircraft, and then take it back to Cairo to re-sell it.

The pair of them tried to repair the plane, its tires had melted to the runway and its engines were filled with sand. The brakes failed after a test flight with both men flying, and the plane crashed into a sand dune.

The event attracted public attention, since the plane was unique in being a private aircraft at Khartoum International Airport and known to belong to Osama bin Laden. Worried that the Egyptian Mukhabarat would learn of his whereabouts, al-Ridi fled the Sudan.

== Later life ==
In 1998, he was called to testify against Wadi el-Hage.
