= Haßleben =

- Municipality
- Coat of arms

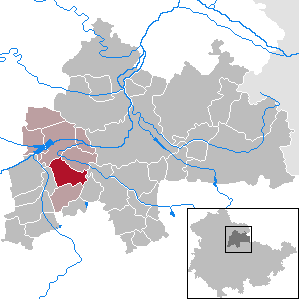
- Location of Haßleben within Sömmerda district
- Interactive map of Haßleben
- Location within Germany Location within Thuringia
- Coordinates: 51°7′N 11°0′E
- Country: Germany
- State: Thuringia
- District: Sömmerda
- Municipal assoc.: Straußfurt

Government
  - Mayor (2022–28): Norman Mönchgesang

Area
  - Total: 14.34 km^{2} (5.54 sq mi)
- Elevation: 152 m (499 ft)

Population (2025-12-31)
  - Total: 930
  - Density: 65/km^{2} (170/sq mi)
- Time zone: UTC+01:00 (CET)
  - Summer (DST): UTC+02:00 (CEST)
- Postal codes: 99189
- Dialling codes: 036201
- Vehicle registration: SÖM
- Website: www.vg-straussfurt.de

Haßleben is a municipality in the Sömmerda district of Thuringia, Germany.
