= Griefstedt =

- Municipality
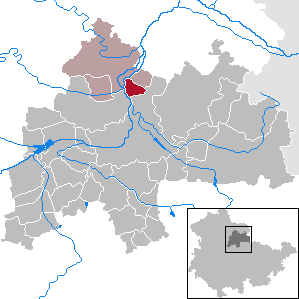
- Location of Griefstedt within Sömmerda district
- Interactive map of Griefstedt
- Location within Germany Location within Thuringia
- Coordinates: 51°14′N 11°08′E
- Country: Germany
- State: Thuringia
- District: Sömmerda
- Municipal assoc.: Kindelbrück

Government
  - Mayor (2022–28): Norbert Mücke

Area
  - Total: 5.06 km^{2} (1.95 sq mi)
- Elevation: 136 m (446 ft)

Population (2025-12-31)
  - Total: 235
  - Density: 46.4/km^{2} (120/sq mi)
- Time zone: UTC+01:00 (CET)
  - Summer (DST): UTC+02:00 (CEST)
- Postal codes: 99638
- Dialling codes: 036375
- Vehicle registration: SÖM
- Website: Gemeinde Griefstedt

Griefstedt is a municipality in the Sömmerda district of Thuringia, Germany.
