= Nöda =

- Municipality
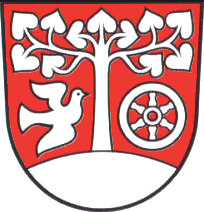
- Coat of arms

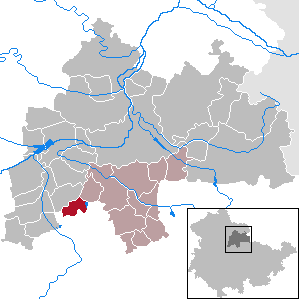
- Location of Nöda within Sömmerda district
- Interactive map of Nöda
- Location within Germany Location within Thuringia
- Coordinates: 51°04′N 11°01′E
- Country: Germany
- State: Thuringia
- District: Sömmerda
- Municipal assoc.: Gramme-Vippach

Government
  - Mayor (2022–28): Stefan Berth (CDU)

Area
  - Total: 6.44 km^{2} (2.49 sq mi)
- Elevation: 170 m (560 ft)

Population (2025-12-31)
  - Total: 789
  - Density: 123/km^{2} (317/sq mi)
- Time zone: UTC+01:00 (CET)
  - Summer (DST): UTC+02:00 (CEST)
- Postal codes: 99195
- Dialling codes: 036204
- Vehicle registration: SÖM

Nöda (German pronunciation: [ˈnøːdaː]) is a municipality in the Sömmerda district of Thuringia, Germany.
