= Udestedt =

- Municipality
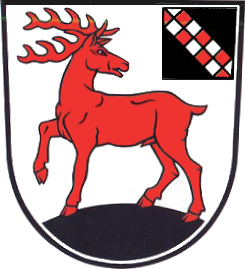
- Coat of arms

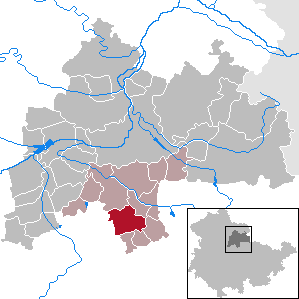
- Location of Udestedt within Sömmerda district
- Interactive map of Udestedt
- Location within Germany Location within Thuringia
- Coordinates: 51°3′N 11°8′E
- Country: Germany
- State: Thuringia
- District: Sömmerda
- Municipal assoc.: Gramme-Vippach

Government
  - Mayor (2022–28): Gunnar Dieling

Area
  - Total: 16.30 km^{2} (6.29 sq mi)
- Elevation: 174 m (571 ft)

Population (2025-12-31)
  - Total: 755
  - Density: 46.3/km^{2} (120/sq mi)
- Time zone: UTC+01:00 (CET)
  - Summer (DST): UTC+02:00 (CEST)
- Postal codes: 99198
- Dialling codes: 036203
- Vehicle registration: SÖM

Udestedt is a municipality in the Sömmerda district of Thuringia, Germany.
