= Großrudestedt =

- Municipality
- Coat of arms

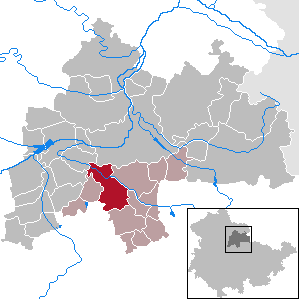
- Location of Großrudestedt within Sömmerda district
- Interactive map of Großrudestedt
- Location within Germany Location within Thuringia
- Coordinates: 51°05′N 11°06′E
- Country: Germany
- State: Thuringia
- District: Sömmerda
- Municipal assoc.: Gramme-Vippach

Government
  - Mayor (2022–28): Andreas Müller

Area
  - Total: 23.87 km^{2} (9.22 sq mi)
- Elevation: 163 m (535 ft)

Population (2025-12-31)
  - Total: 1,840
  - Density: 77.1/km^{2} (200/sq mi)
- Time zone: UTC+01:00 (CET)
  - Summer (DST): UTC+02:00 (CEST)
- Postal codes: 99195
- Dialling codes: 036204
- Vehicle registration: SÖM

Großrudestedt is a municipality in the Sömmerda district of Thuringia, Germany.
