= Kleinmölsen =

- Municipality
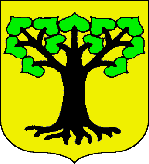
- Coat of arms

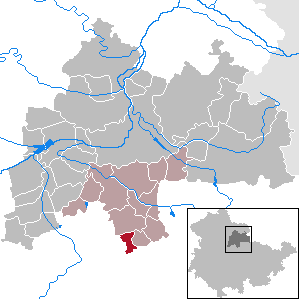
- Location of Kleinmölsen within Sömmerda district
- Interactive map of Kleinmölsen
- Location within Germany Location within Thuringia
- Coordinates: 51°02′N 11°07′E
- Country: Germany
- State: Thuringia
- District: Sömmerda
- Municipal assoc.: Gramme-Vippach

Government
  - Mayor (2022–28): Axel Zur

Area
  - Total: 4.30 km^{2} (1.66 sq mi)
- Elevation: 180 m (590 ft)

Population (2025-12-31)
  - Total: 299
  - Density: 69.5/km^{2} (180/sq mi)
- Time zone: UTC+01:00 (CET)
  - Summer (DST): UTC+02:00 (CEST)
- Postal codes: 99198
- Dialling codes: 036203
- Vehicle registration: SÖM
- Website: www.kleinmoelsen.de

Kleinmölsen is a municipality in the Sömmerda district of Thuringia, Germany.
