= Alperstedt =

- Municipality
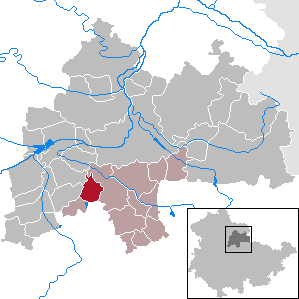
- Location of Alperstedt within Sömmerda district
- Interactive map of Alperstedt
- Location within Germany Location within Thuringia
- Coordinates: 51°6′N 11°3′E
- Country: Germany
- State: Thuringia
- District: Sömmerda
- Municipal assoc.: Gramme-Vippach

Government
  - Mayor (2021–27): Torsten Richardt

Area
  - Total: 8.88 km^{2} (3.43 sq mi)
- Elevation: 157 m (515 ft)

Population (2025-12-31)
  - Total: 732
  - Density: 82.4/km^{2} (213/sq mi)
- Time zone: UTC+01:00 (CET)
  - Summer (DST): UTC+02:00 (CEST)
- Postal codes: 99195
- Dialling codes: 036204
- Vehicle registration: SÖM
- Website: www.gemeinde-alperstedt.de

Alperstedt is a municipality in the Sömmerda district of Thuringia, Germany.
