= Ollendorf =

- Municipality
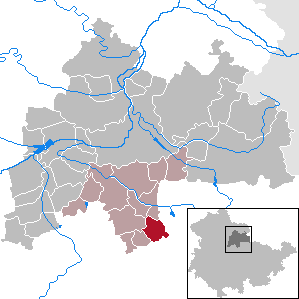
- Location of Ollendorf within Sömmerda district
- Interactive map of Ollendorf
- Location within Germany Location within Thuringia
- Coordinates: 51°2′12″N 11°11′18″E
- Country: Germany
- State: Thuringia
- District: Sömmerda
- Municipal assoc.: Gramme-Vippach

Government
  - Mayor (2022–28): Volker Reifarth

Area
  - Total: 9.15 km^{2} (3.53 sq mi)
- Elevation: 212 m (696 ft)

Population (2025-12-31)
  - Total: 424
  - Density: 46.3/km^{2} (120/sq mi)
- Time zone: UTC+01:00 (CET)
  - Summer (DST): UTC+02:00 (CEST)
- Postal codes: 99198
- Dialling codes: 036203
- Vehicle registration: SÖM

Ollendorf is a municipality in the Sömmerda district of Thuringia, Germany.
