= Markvippach =

- Municipality
- Coat of arms

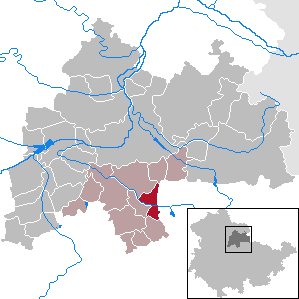
- Location of Markvippach within Sömmerda district
- Interactive map of Markvippach
- Location within Germany Location within Thuringia
- Coordinates: 51°4′N 11°10′E
- Country: Germany
- State: Thuringia
- District: Sömmerda
- Municipal assoc.: Gramme-Vippach

Government
  - Mayor (2024–30): Jeannine Zeuner

Area
  - Total: 9.18 km^{2} (3.54 sq mi)
- Elevation: 172 m (564 ft)

Population (2025-12-31)
  - Total: 535
  - Density: 58.3/km^{2} (151/sq mi)
- Time zone: UTC+01:00 (CET)
  - Summer (DST): UTC+02:00 (CEST)
- Postal codes: 99195
- Dialling codes: 036371
- Vehicle registration: SÖM

Markvippach is a municipality in the Sömmerda district of Thuringia, Germany.
