= Eckstedt =

- Municipality
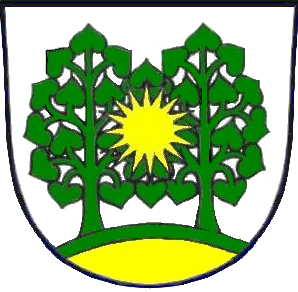
- Coat of arms

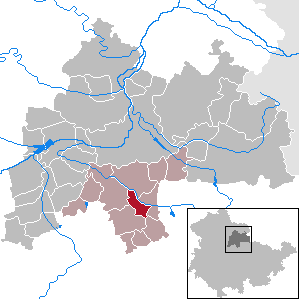
- Location of Eckstedt within Sömmerda district
- Interactive map of Eckstedt
- Location within Germany Location within Thuringia
- Coordinates: 51°4′N 11°7′E
- Country: Germany
- State: Thuringia
- District: Sömmerda
- Municipal assoc.: Gramme-Vippach

Government
  - Mayor (2022–28): Sabine Schnabel

Area
  - Total: 6.57 km^{2} (2.54 sq mi)
- Elevation: 167 m (548 ft)

Population (2025-12-31)
  - Total: 570
  - Density: 87/km^{2} (220/sq mi)
- Time zone: UTC+01:00 (CET)
  - Summer (DST): UTC+02:00 (CEST)
- Postal codes: 99195
- Dialling codes: 036371
- Vehicle registration: SÖM
- Website: www.eckstedt.de

Eckstedt (German pronunciation: [ˈɛkʃtɛt]) is a municipality in the Sömmerda district of Thuringia, Germany.
