= Sprötau =

- Municipality
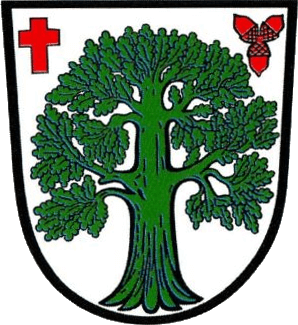
- Coat of arms

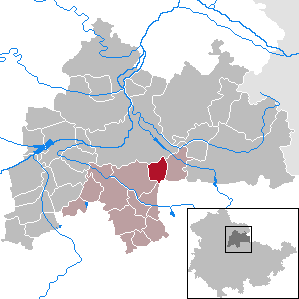
- Location of Sprötau within Sömmerda district
- Interactive map of Sprötau
- Location within Germany Location within Thuringia
- Coordinates: 51°7′N 11°11′E
- Country: Germany
- State: Thuringia
- District: Sömmerda
- Municipal assoc.: Gramme-Vippach

Government
  - Mayor (2022–28): Sabine Redam

Area
  - Total: 8.02 km^{2} (3.10 sq mi)
- Elevation: 200 m (660 ft)

Population (2025-12-31)
  - Total: 835
  - Density: 104/km^{2} (270/sq mi)
- Time zone: UTC+01:00 (CET)
  - Summer (DST): UTC+02:00 (CEST)
- Postal codes: 99610
- Dialling codes: 036371
- Vehicle registration: SÖM
- Website: www.sproetau.de

Sprötau is a municipality in the Sömmerda district of Thuringia, Germany.
