= Großmölsen =

- Municipality
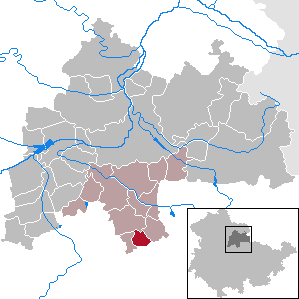
- Location of Großmölsen within Sömmerda district
- Interactive map of Großmölsen
- Location within Germany Location within Thuringia
- Coordinates: 51°2′N 11°8′E
- Country: Germany
- State: Thuringia
- District: Sömmerda
- Municipal assoc.: Gramme-Vippach

Government
  - Mayor (2023–29): Tobias Ballin

Area
  - Total: 4.99 km^{2} (1.93 sq mi)
- Elevation: 177 m (581 ft)

Population (2025-12-31)
  - Total: 226
  - Density: 45.3/km^{2} (117/sq mi)
- Time zone: UTC+01:00 (CET)
  - Summer (DST): UTC+02:00 (CEST)
- Postal codes: 99198
- Dialling codes: 036203
- Vehicle registration: SÖM

Großmölsen is a municipality in the Sömmerda district of Thuringia, Germany.
