= Gramme-Vippach =

- Verwaltungsgemeinschaft
- Map of Sömmerda highlighting Gramme-Vippach
- Interactive map of Gramme-Vippach
- Location within Germany Location within Thuringia
- Coordinates: 51°06′N 11°08′E
- Country: Germany
- State: Thuringia
- District: Sömmerda
- Seat: Schloßvippach
- Subdivisions: 12 municipalities

Area
  - Total: 131.67 km^{2} (50.84 sq mi)

Population (2025-12-31)
  - Total: 8,965
  - Density: 68.09/km^{2} (176.3/sq mi)
- Time zone: UTC+01:00 (CET)
  - Summer (DST): UTC+02:00 (CEST)
- Website: www.gramme-vippach.de

Gramme-Vippach is a Verwaltungsgemeinschaft ("collective municipality") in the district of Sömmerda, Thuringia, Germany. The seat of the Verwaltungsgemeinschaft is in Schloßvippach. It was formed on 31 December 2019 by the merger of the former Verwaltungsgemeinschaften An der Marke and Gramme-Aue.

The Verwaltungsgemeinschaft Gramme-Vippach consists of the following municipalities:

1. Alperstedt
2. Eckstedt
3. Großmölsen
4. Großrudestedt
5. Kleinmölsen
6. Markvippach
7. Nöda
8. Ollendorf
9. Schloßvippach
10. Sprötau
11. Udestedt
12. Vogelsberg
