= Werningshausen =

- Municipality
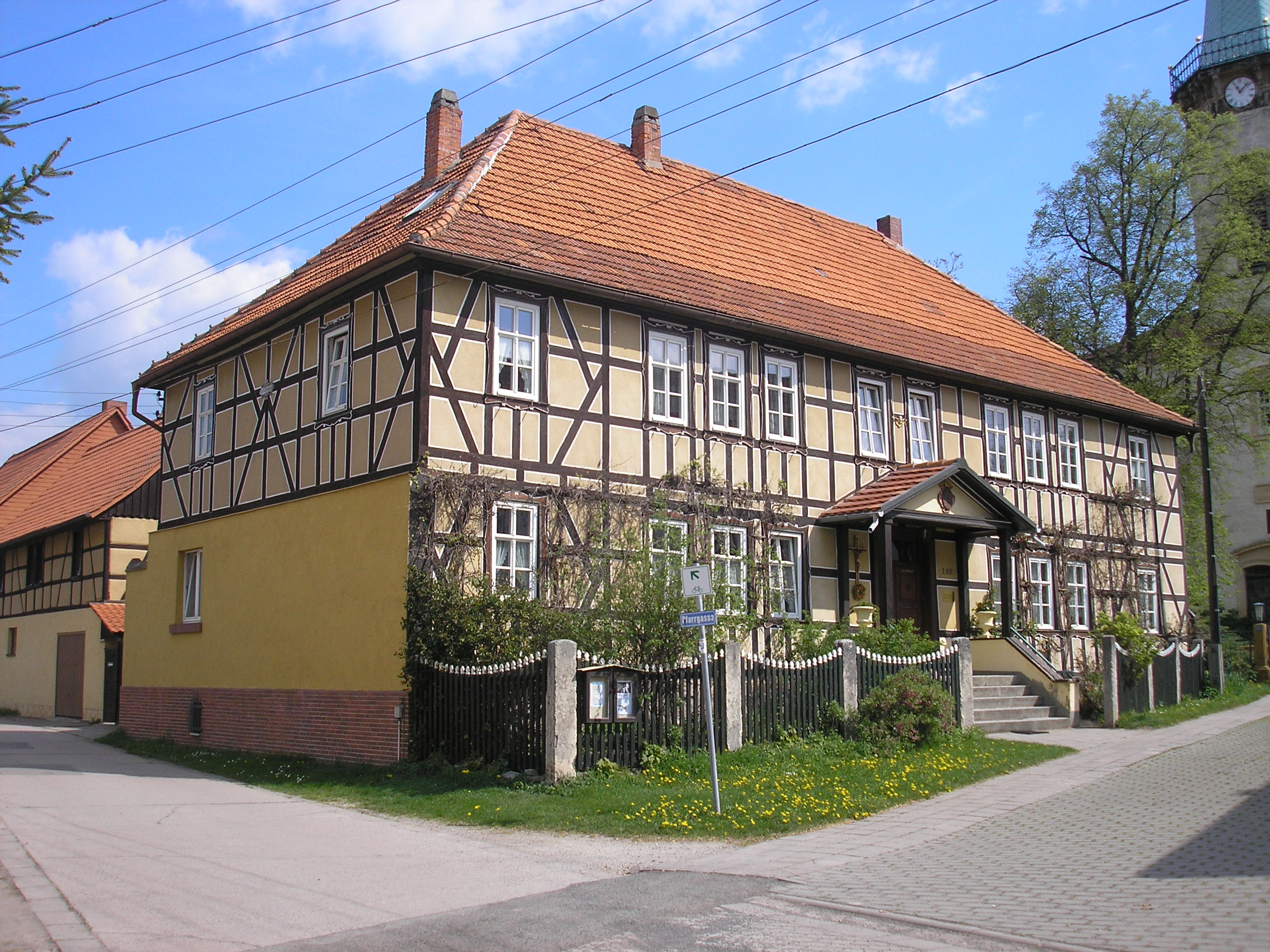
- Rectory

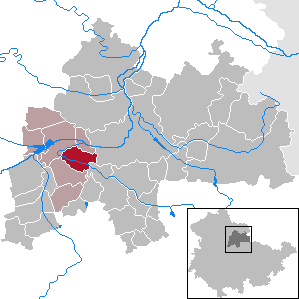
- Location of Werningshausen within Sömmerda district
- Interactive map of Werningshausen
- Location within Germany Location within Thuringia
- Coordinates: 51°8′N 11°0′E
- Country: Germany
- State: Thuringia
- District: Sömmerda
- Municipal assoc.: Straußfurt

Government
  - Mayor (2022–28): Stefan Rudolph

Area
  - Total: 12.78 km^{2} (4.93 sq mi)
- Elevation: 147 m (482 ft)

Population (2025-12-31)
  - Total: 635
  - Density: 49.7/km^{2} (129/sq mi)
- Time zone: UTC+01:00 (CET)
  - Summer (DST): UTC+02:00 (CEST)
- Postal codes: 99634
- Dialling codes: 036376
- Vehicle registration: SÖM
- Website: www.vg-straussfurt.de

Werningshausen is a municipality in the Sömmerda district of Thuringia, Germany.
