= Schloßvippach =

- Municipality
- Coat of arms

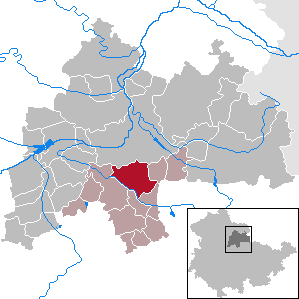
- Location of Schloßvippach within Sömmerda district
- Interactive map of Schloßvippach
- Location within Germany Location within Thuringia
- Coordinates: 51°6′N 11°7′E
- Country: Germany
- State: Thuringia
- District: Sömmerda
- Municipal assoc.: Gramme-Vippach

Government
  - Mayor (2022–28): Uwe Köhler (CDU)

Area
  - Total: 20.92 km^{2} (8.08 sq mi)
- Elevation: 175 m (574 ft)

Population (2025-12-31)
  - Total: 1,309
  - Density: 62.57/km^{2} (162.1/sq mi)
- Time zone: UTC+01:00 (CET)
  - Summer (DST): UTC+02:00 (CEST)
- Postal codes: 99195
- Dialling codes: 036371
- Vehicle registration: SÖM
- Website: www.schlossvippach.de

Schloßvippach is a municipality in the Sömmerda district of Thuringia, Germany.
