= Vogelsberg, Thuringia =

Vogelsberg
- Municipality
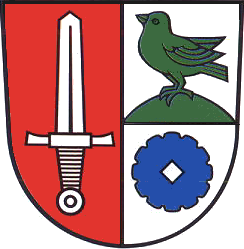
- Coat of arms

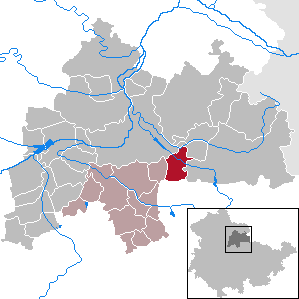
- Location of Vogelsberg within Sömmerda district
- Interactive map of Vogelsberg
- Location within Germany Location within Thuringia
- Coordinates: 51°8′2″N 11°14′37″E
- Country: Germany
- State: Thuringia
- District: Sömmerda
- Municipal assoc.: Gramme-Vippach

Government
  - Mayor (2024–30): Christopher Harsch

Area
  - Total: 12.84 km^{2} (4.96 sq mi)
- Elevation: 155 m (509 ft)

Population (2025-12-31)
  - Total: 651
  - Density: 50.7/km^{2} (131/sq mi)
- Time zone: UTC+01:00 (CET)
  - Summer (DST): UTC+02:00 (CEST)
- Postal codes: 99610
- Dialling codes: 036372
- Vehicle registration: SÖM
- Website: www.vogelsberg-thueringen.de

Vogelsberg is a municipality in the Sömmerda district of Thuringia, Germany.
