= Sömmerda (district) =

Coordinates: 51°10′N 11°10′E

- District
- Flag Coat of arms
- Country: Germany
- State: Thuringia
- Capital: Sömmerda

Government
  - District admin.: Christian Karl (CDU)

Area
  - Total: 806.84 km^{2} (311.52 sq mi)

Population (31 December 2022)
  - Total: 69,646
  - Density: 86/km^{2} (220/sq mi)
- Time zone: UTC+01:00 (CET)
  - Summer (DST): UTC+02:00 (CEST)
- Vehicle registration: SÖM
- Website: www.landkreis-soemmerda.de

Sömmerda (German: Landkreis Sömmerda) is a Kreis (district) in the north of Thuringia, Germany. Neighboring districts are (from the north clockwise) the districts Kyffhäuserkreis, the Burgenlandkreis in Saxony-Anhalt, the district Weimarer Land and the district-free city Erfurt, and the districts Gotha and Unstrut-Hainich-Kreis.

== History ==
The district Sömmerda was created in 1952. In 1994, the districts of Thuringia were reorganized, and the district Sömmerda was enlarged significantly by adding municipalities from the dissolved districts Artern and Erfurt-Land.

== Geography ==
The main river in the district is the Unstrut. The nearby town of Kölleda is known locally as the Peppermint City because of its long history of growing aromatic and medicinal herbs.

== Coat of arms ==
The coat of arms shows the three historic states which Sömmerda belonged to in the past. In the left is the Saxon symbol, to the right is the lion as symbol of Thuringia, and in the bottom is the Wheel of Mainz as the symbol of Mainz.

== Towns and municipalities ==
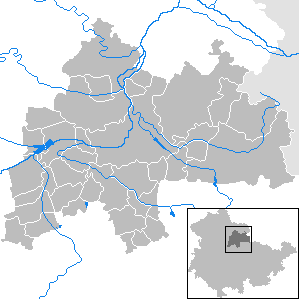
Clickable map of towns and municipalities in the district

Verwaltungsgemeinschaft-free towns
1. Kölleda
2. Sömmerda
3. Weißensee
and municipalities
1. Buttstädt
2. Elxleben
3. Witterda

Verwaltungsgemeinschaften
1. Gera-Aue; 1. Andisleben; 2. Gebesee^{1, 2}; 3. Ringleben; 4. Walschleben	2. Gramme-Vippach; 1. Alperstedt; 2. Eckstedt; 3. Großmölsen; 4. Großrudestedt; 5. Kleinmölsen; 6. Markvippach; 7. Nöda; 8. Ollendorf; 9. Schloßvippach^{1}; 10. Sprötau; 11. Udestedt; 12. Vogelsberg	3. Kindelbrück; 1. Büchel; 2. Griefstedt; 3. Günstedt; 4. Kindelbrück^{1}; 4. Kölleda; [seat: Kölleda]: 1. Großneuhausen; 2. Kleinneuhausen; 3. Ostramondra; 4. Rastenberg^{2}	5. Straußfurt; 1. Gangloffsömmern; 2. Haßleben; 3. Riethnordhausen; 4. Schwerstedt; 5. Straußfurt^{1}; 6. Werningshausen; 7. Wundersleben
^{1}seat of the Verwaltungsgemeinschaft;^{2}town
