= Buttstädt (Verwaltungsgemeinschaft) =

Coordinates: 51.117°N 11.417°E

Buttstädt is a former Verwaltungsgemeinschaft ("collective municipality") in the district of Sömmerda, in Thuringia, Germany. The seat of the Verwaltungsgemeinschaft was in Buttstädt. The Verwaltungsgemeinschaft was founded on 1 January 1991. On 4 February 1995, it was expanded to include the municipalities of Großbrembach and Kleinbrembach. It was disbanded at the start of 2019.

The Verwaltungsgemeinschaft Buttstädt consisted of the following municipalities:

1. Buttstädt (Municipality)
2. Ellersleben
3. Eßleben-Teutleben
4. Großbrembach
5. Guthmannshausen
6. Hardisleben
7. Kleinbrembach
8. Mannstedt
9. Olbersleben
10. Rudersdorf
