= Wilhelm-Ernst-Gymnasium =

Former high school in Weimar, Germany

Coordinates: 50°58′53″N 11°19′47″E

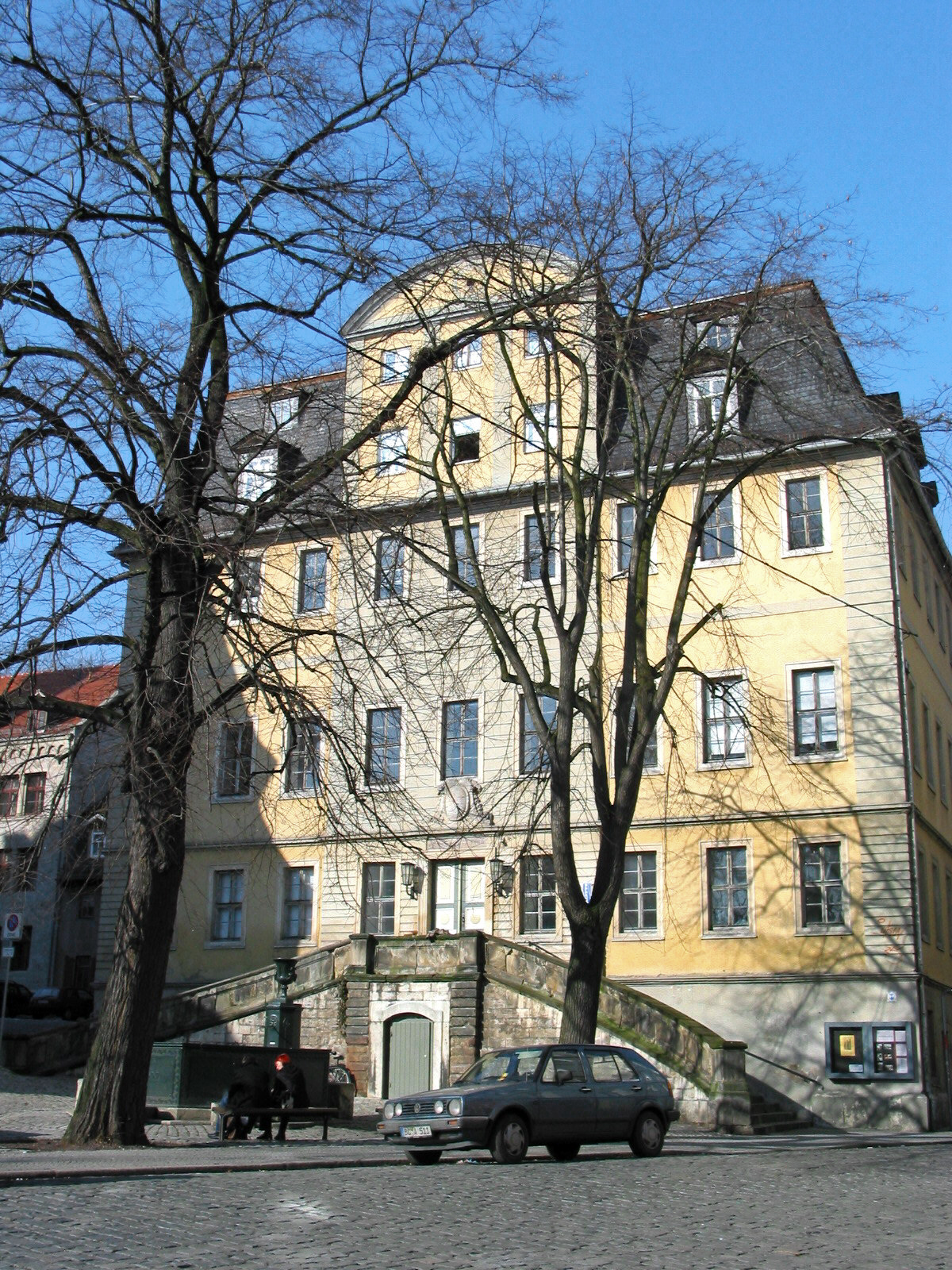
Wilhelm-Ernst-Gymnasium

The Wilhelm-Ernst-Gymnasium is a secondary school on Herderplatz 14 in Weimar, Germany. Founded in 1712 by Duke William Ernest of Saxe-Weimar, it is the oldest school building in the city. Numerous notable figures such as Johann Gottfried Herder, Johann Heinrich Voss, Friedrich Wilhelm Riemer and Johann Karl August Musäus studied here. It is a designated historic site and is one of the few secular buildings of the pre-classical period still remaining in Weimar. It is prominently located in the urban center and is one of three sites forming the UNESCO World Heritage Site Classical Weimar, created in 1998.

== History ==
The Wilhelm-Ernst-Gymnasium was founded in 1712 at the behest of William Ernest, Duke of Saxe-Weimar, to replace the Stadt- und Landschule (school of the town and the region) of 1561. Among the teachers were Johann Heinrich Voss, Friedrich Wilhelm Riemer and Johann Karl August Musäus. In 1776 Weimar General Superintendent Johann Gottfried Herder took over as the director and headmaster, and was also superintendent of all the schools of the Duchy of Saxe-Weimar-Eisenach. From 1784, Karl August, Grand Duke of Saxe-Weimar-Eisenach, of Saxe-Weimar-Eisenach permitted the Reformed congregation to use the hall for church services. By 1800 the school installed a library. In the 19th century the building served as a humanistisches Gymnasium. Growing numbers of students led to a move to a larger school building on 10 October 1887, called Goethe Gymnasium Weimar since 1991. The old building served from 1910 as the Großherzoglich-Sächsische Baugewerkenschule Weimar. From 1953, the building housed a Museum of Natural History and a Polytechnisches Zentrum, classrooms and production areas for technical teaching.

== Building ==
The school building, in the Baroque style, was built from 1712 to 1716 next to the church St. Peter und Paul on the Herderplatz and inaugurated by state architect Christian II Richter. It bears the inscription "Soli Deo Gloria" (Glory to God alone). It is a three-storey building with a high mansard roof. The facade is highlighted by a three-axis avant-corps, crowned by a spire light. A sweeping, double flight staircase dominates the square. In 1976, the once spacious foyer, which linked the ground floor to the top floor, was closed in favor of an additional classroom, and a massive staircase was built as a steel structure with concrete steps. On the ground floor and the first floor, the building has six large classrooms and a hall with a preserved stucco ceiling. The upper floors held previously apartments for the teachers.

== Later usage ==
The premises of were used after 1990 by a non-commercial local broadcaster, Radio Lotte, to 2008, and by the Volkshochschule Weimar. The Classical Weimar, an ensemble of the former high school, the Herder House and the church St. Peter und Paul, is currently restored for € 5,4 million from the Investitionsprogramm Nationale UNESCO Welterbestätten (National Investment Program UNESCO World Heritage Sites) of the Federal Government. No agreement for a future use was reached. One idea is to set up a Herder museum", to commemorate the work of the poet, translator, philosopher and theologian at the site of his former workplace.

== Directors ==
Senior Deputy Vice Presidents and Directors of the high school (in order of tenure):

- Johann Matthias Gesner (1691–1761), classical scholar and librarian – vice-principal from 1715 to 1729
- Johann Friedrich Hirt (1719–1783), Protestant theologian, orientalist, philosopher – vice-principal from 1748 to 1758
- Johann Gottfried Herder (1744–1803), poet, translator, theologian, philosopher, etc. – Director from 1776 to 1791
- Karl August Böttiger (1760–1835), philologist, archaeological writer – director from 1791 to 1806
- Johann Friedrich Röhr (1777–1848), theologian, author, speaker – headmaster from 1820
- Hermann Sauppe (1809–1893), classical scholar, educator and epigraphist – Director from 1845 to 1856
- Gustav Weiland, Director from 1856 to 1860
- Hermann Rassow (1819–1907), a classicist and Aristotle researchers – Director from 1860 to 1881
- Hugo Ilberg (1828–1883), a respected high school teacher – vice principal from 1861 to 1862
- Ludwig Weniger, Director from 1881 to 1908

== Professors ==
Known teachers and professors of the high school (in order of teaching time):

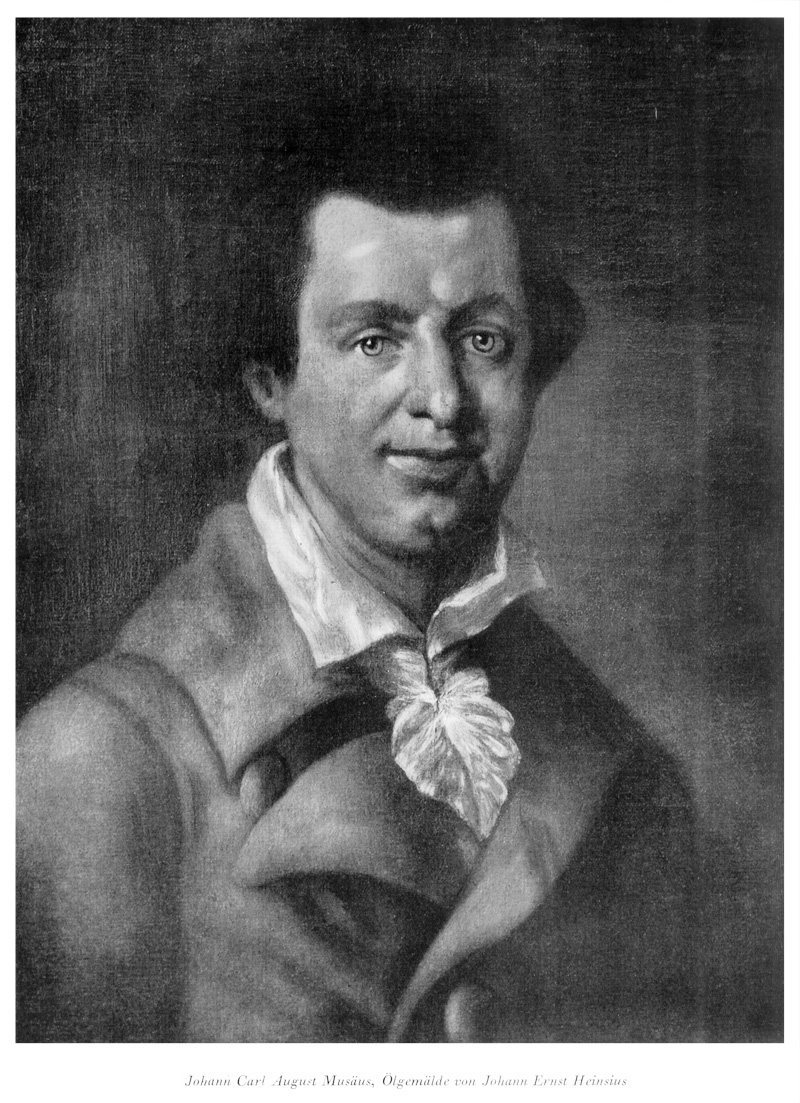
Johann Karl August Musäus

- Johann Karl August Musäus (1735–1787), writer, philologist – 1769 Professor of Ancient Languages and History
- Johann Traugott Leberecht Danz (1769–1851), German church historian and theologian – Teacher until 1798
- Johann Heinrich Voß (1751–1826), poet, translator – Professor from 1804 to 1806
- Franz Passow (1786–1833), classical scholar – from 1807 to 1810 professor of Greek
- Ferdinand Gotthelf Hand (1786–1851), classical scholar – from 1810 Professor of Philosophy and Greek Literature
- Johannes Schulze (1786–1869), Prussian theologian, scholar, educator and cultural officer – Professor from 1808 to 1812
- Friedrich Wilhelm Riemer (1774–1845), philologist, writer, librarian, Goethe's secretary – a professor from 1812 to 1821
- Heinrich Graefe (1802–1868), German educator – spiritual master of the grammar school
- Christian Gottlob Tröbst (1811–1888), theologian, philosopher and mathematician – Professor from 1847
- Otto Apelt (1845–1932), classical scholar and translator – from 1869 to 1898 head teacher or professor

== Alumni ==
Notable students and graduates of the high school (in order of birth):

- August Wilhelm Hupel (1737–1819), Baltic German pastor, writer
- Friedrich Justin Bertuch (1747–1822), publisher and philanthropist
- Johann Gottlob Bernstein (1747–1835), German physician, professor of medicine
- August von Kotzebue (1761–1819), dramatist and author
- Christian August Vulpius (1762–1827), German writer, librarian
- Carl Leberecht Schwabe (1778–1851), mayor of the city of Weimar, Saxony-Weimar Councilor
- Gottlob König (1779–1849), a German forest scientist – student from 1790 to 1794
- Charles Benoît Hase (Charles Benedict Hase) librarian (1780–1864), a classicist, paleographer, professord
- Wilhelm Martin Leberecht de Wette (1780–1849), theologian
- Hieronymus Müller (1785–1861), philologist and translator
- Johann Gottlob Töpfer (1791–1870), organist and composer – student from 1804 to 1808
- Karl Wilhelm Göttling (1793–1869), classical scholar
- Emil Huschke (1797–1858), anatomist, zoologist and embryologist – student from 1811
- Johann Christian Lobe (1797–1881), composer and music theorist – student from 1804 to 1811
- Henry Aemilius August Danz (1806–1881), German jurist – student from 1820
- Carl Zeiss (1816–1888), engineer and entrepreneur – student from 1832
- Karl Eckermann (1834–1891), German landscape painter
- Alfred Götze (1865–1948), German prehistorian, museum director – student from 1875 to 1886
- Hans Wahl (1885–1949), Goethe scholar, museum and archive manager – student from 1894
- George Haar (1887–1945), founder and notary – student from 1897 to 1906
- Felix Raabe (1900–1996), conductor and musicologist – graduated in 1919
