= Kunst and Albers =

Former German trading company in Russia

Coordinates: 43.1155°N 131.8879°E

Kunst and Albers (German: Kunst und Albers, Russian: Кунст и Альберс) or Kunst & Albers was a German trading company in Russia. Founded by Gustav Kunst, a merchant, and Gustav Albers, a sailor, it operated the first department store in Vladivostok. At its height, it was a vast business empire and the largest trading company in the Russian Far East.

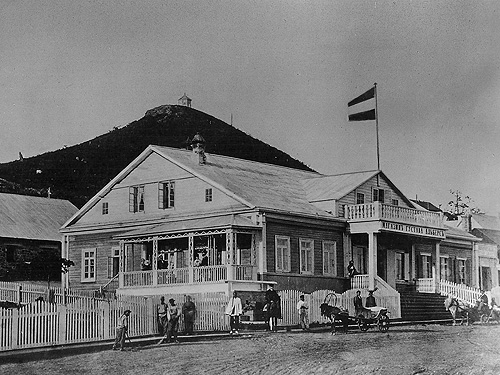
The first building of Kunst and Albers in Vladivostok, 1876

== Establishment and growth ==
On September 16, 1864, Gustav Albers (1838-1911), the son of a Hamburg jeweller, arrived in Vladivostok on board the schooner "Meta". He unloaded a cargo of food staples and building materials. Shortly before that, he had met the Hamburg merchant Gustav Kunst (1836-1905) in Shanghai and they decided to go into business together. At the time, the town of Vladivostok consisted of 44 wooden buildings.

The first store, constructed of wood, was built in 1865. In 1875, Adolph Dattan (1854-1924), a young man from Rudersdorf, Thuringia, who had worked as a bookkeeper for Albers' brother in Hamburg, joined the firm. In 1884, the store moved to a new stone building. Apart from the bricks, all the building materials used in the store had come by boat from Hamburg. The new store had 18 departments and the company was also to offer banking services.

The construction of the Trans-Siberian Railway, heading west from Vladivostok, began in 1891, and this meant an economic boom for the city and the department store. Gustav Kunst left the company in 1898, taking up residence in Hawaii and Samoa. Dattan became a partner and, in 1914, was elevated to the Russian nobility for his contributions to the development of the Primorye region.

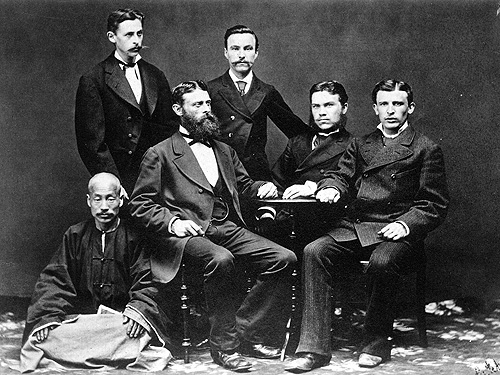
The heads of the company in 1880: seated at the table from left to right are Gustav Albers, Gustav Kunst and Adolph Dattan.

During his many business trips, Dattan amassed extensive collections which he donated to various European museums, including a large ethnological collection given to the Museum of Ethnology, Vienna, Austria and a zoological collection donated to the Naturhistorisches Museum, Braunschweig, Germany.

In 1907, the German architect Georg Junghändel, who also designed St. Paul's Lutheran Church in Vladivostok, built a new department store on Svetlanskaya Ulitsa in the Art Nouveau style. It now houses the GUM department store. Junghändel also built an elegant house in the villa style for Dattan, opposite the department store.

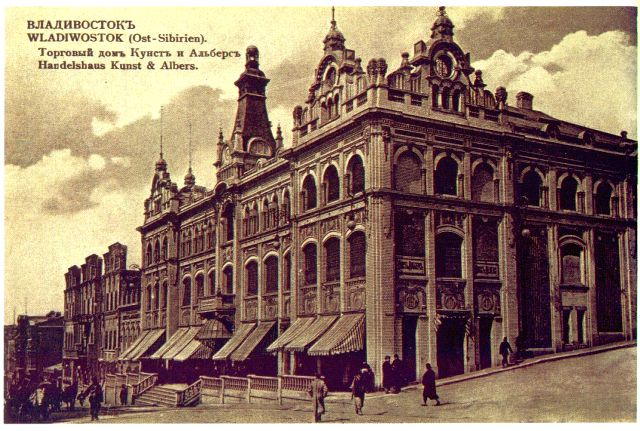
The department store of Kunst and Albers, erected in 1907 on Svetlanskaya Street in Vladivostok

== Later years and decline of the firm ==
By 1914, Kunst & Albers had 32 branch stores. World War I brought an end to the flow of merchandise from Germany. Multiple publications spread the rumour that the firm was operating a German spying network, the main source of such rumours being the publicist Ferdynand Antoni Ossendowski. In the 1950s, George F. Kennan wrote that: "it is doubtful whether the history of journalism could produce another instance of such a violent and prolonged personal vendetta". Adolph Dattan was exiled in 1915 to Siberia, and did not return to Vladivostok until 1919/1920, at the age of 65. Alfred Albers (1877-1960), son of Gustav Albers and junior partner in the company, was drafted into the Tsar's army.

Some of the branch stores were destroyed and others expropriated, and in the end the whole company was expropriated under Bolshevik rule. In 1924, Alfred Albers moved the company's main business to China. In the same year, Adolph Dattan died in Naumburg. In 1930, the Vladivostok store was forced to close its doors because of overwhelming taxation by the Soviet authorities. One year later, the shipping office also closed.

In China, and under the direction of Georg von Dattan, the company remained active largely as a wholesaler and general representative for German companies, eventually opening ten branches between the Amur region and Hong Kong. The start of World War II brought an end to that business, too. After the war, Alfred Albers continued to operate an export business under the Kunst and Albers name. His death, in 1960, brought the history of the company to an end.

== Notable employees ==
Asta Hampe early German woman engineer

== See also ==
- List of trading companies

== Sources ==
- Lothar Deeg. Kunst & Albers Wladiwostok. Ein deutsches Handelshaus jenseits von Sibirien (1864–1924). Norderstedt: BoD - Books on Demand, 2020. ISBN 978-3-7504-2588-0.
- Lothar Deeg. Kunst und Albers Vladivostok: The History of a German Trading Company in the Russian Far East (1864-1924), trans. Sarah Bohnet. Vladivostok: Far Eastern Federal University Press, 2012. ISBN 978-5-7444-2812-9.
- Lothar Deeg. Kunst & Albers: Die Kaufhauskönige von Wladiwostok: Aufstieg und Untergang eines deutschen Handelshauses jenseits von Sibirien. Essen: Klartext Verlag, 2012 ISBN 978-3-8375-0764-5.
- Ludmila Thomas. „Das Handelshaus Kunst und Albers im russischen Fernen Osten bis 1917: Zum Problem des deutschen Kapitals in Rußland“. Jahrbuch für Geschichte der sozialistischen Länder Europas, no. 28. Berlin: Deutscher Verlag der Wissenschaften, 1984. ISSN 0075-2657.
