= Adolph Dattan =

German-Russian merchant (1854–1924)

Adolph Traugott Arthur Dattan
- Адольф Васильевич Даттан
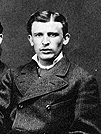
- Dattan in 1880
- Born: 22 October 1854; Rudersdorf, Thuringia, Germany
- Died: 14 August 1924 (aged 69); Naumburg (Saale), Germany

Adolph Traugott Arthur Dattan (Russian: Адольф Васильевич Даттан, romanized: Adolf Vasilyevich Dattan; 22 October 1854 – 14 August 1924) was a German-Russian merchant and part-owner of Kunst and Albers, a large trading company in Vladivostok, Russia. He made a name for himself as a philanthropist and supporter of the sciences. During World War I, he was exiled under suspicion of espionage to a remote area of Siberia.

== Life ==
Adolph Dattan was born in Rudersdorf, near Buttstädt, Germany, the youngest of ten children. His father was a Lutheran village pastor and the family was of modest means. He completed all ten years of his schooling at home, as was not unusual for pastors' children at that time. His father, as a young man, had been a private tutor in the home of a Prussian baron in Southern France.

=== Training and early work ===
Dattan completed a four-year merchant's apprenticeship in the business of his brother-in-law in Naumburg, where he continued to make do with limited means. At the age of 18 he moved to Hamburg, a first step toward his goal of emigrating to South America. For the next two years, he worked in various positions, mostly as a bookkeeper, while at the same time furthering his schooling. He earned additional income by keeping the books for a Hamburg jeweller by the name of Fritz Albers, the brother of Gustav Ludewig Albers, who in 1864 together with Gustav Kunst had founded the trading company Kunst & Albers in Vladivostok.

=== Career with Kunst & Albers ===
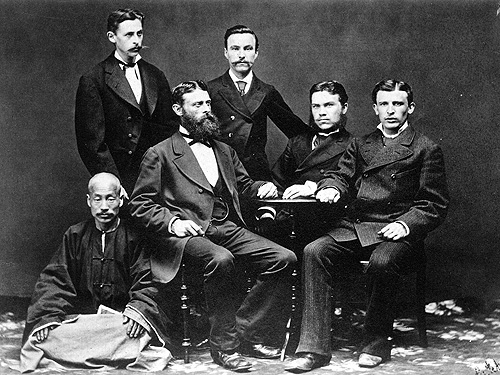
The heads of the Kunst and Albers company, Vladivostok 1880: seated at the table from left to right are Gustav Albers, Gustav Kunst and Adolph Dattan

Dattan's career with Kunst & Albers began when Gustav Albers, then on his first vacation home, hired him as an accountant, the first German employee of the Vladivostok company. His salary was set at 50 roubles a month plus free room and board. In December, 1874, the then twenty-year-old accompanied a cargo of merchandise on board the three-master "Saturnus", bound for East Asia, reaching Vladivostok in the summer of 1875 after two stops in Shanghai and Nagasaki.

In 1879, the company owners gave Dattan signing authority for the Vladivostok firm, and from 1881 onward it was he who actually ran it, since the owners by then lived only intermittently in the city. He was initially granted a ten-percent share of the earnings, with a guaranteed minimum of 5,000 roubles a year, in addition to an annual salary of 2,000 roubles.

Dattan adapted well to the rough conditions and customs of the new Russian territory, and he was especially skilled at building good relations with government agencies and influential officers in the Russian military, a dominant presence in Vladivostok:

“It is distasteful, at least for us Germans, to see two large, bearded fellows embrace and kiss each other on the mouth; as much as I admire Mr. Dattan for making all Russian customs his own, this is one habit I could never adopt. Merchants certainly like to make money, but no money in the world could make me kiss a general or an admiral on his cigar hole, not even to obtain a major contract".

Under Dattan's leadership the company grew rapidly, in terms of both its earnings and its geographical reach: the 1880s saw the opening of the first branch stores in the interior and the Amur region. By 1914, Kunst & Albers had established a network of more than 30 branch stores in the Russian Far East as well as in cross-border areas of China. Running the company involved extensive travel over still largely undeveloped terrain, even in winter when transportation was by horse and sleigh.

By 1886 Dattan was already a partner with a 33 percent profit share in the company. He decided to become a Russian subject, since a new law barred foreigners from acquiring land in the border regions of the Russian empire. The company from then on bought all real estate in the Russian Far East under Dattan's name.

In 1904, when Gustav Kunst gave up his partnership, Dattan became 50 percent owner of both Kunst & Albers in Vladivostok and the Hamburg firm of the same name that was primarily responsible for the financing and purchasing of merchandise in Europe and shipping it to the Russian Far East.

In 1924, shortly before he died, Dattan's Russian assets were transferred to his business partner Alfred Albers in order to forestall expropriation under Soviet inheritance law.

=== Family ===
Dattan did not return to Germany for a vacation until 1887, by which time he was already a wealthy young merchant. He traveled by land, although there was as yet no rail line going through Siberia. During this stay he married Marie Fendler in Naumburg and she accompanied him back to Vladivostok. They had seven children. In 1901, Dattan and his family took up residence in Naumburg, but he continued to return to Vladivostok, where he spent a large part of each year. During World War I, his eldest son Alexander (born 1890), a Russian officer, was killed in action, while his son Adolf (born 1894), who was a German officer, was killed on the western front.

=== Titles and honorary positions ===
In 1887, Dattan was named German trade representative for Vladivostok and the Amur region. In 1904, the German emperor gave him the title of Vice Consul, and by 1908 Dattan was signing his reports to Berlin as "Imperial Consul". He was discharged from that office in 1911, as the German consulate was now being staffed by career diplomats, but he was allowed to use the title of "German Imperial Consul" for the rest of his life.

During the same time, Dattan was also rising in the Russian hierarchy: in 1900, the Tsar named him Commerce Councillor, in 1904, he became State Councillor, and in 1911, Actual State Councillor. Early in 1914, together with his wife and children, Dattan received a hereditary peerage from the Tsar. He was given all these distinctions largely to honour his philanthropic endeavours in funding the Institute of Oriental Studies, the first institute of higher learning in Vladivostok, in which he also held the position of honorary curator.

In addition, Dattan received a total of 24 medals and decorations, twelve from Russia and twelve from other countries. Five of these distinctions were given to honour his support for the sciences.

=== Ethnological and zoological collector ===
During business travel throughout eastern Siberia, Dattan began acquiring, both personally and through purchasing agents, artifacts of native peoples. These he put together into ethnological collections, which he then donated to various museums in Europe, mainly, it seems, in the hope of receiving state honours in exchange from the various countries. In later years he expanded his collector's activities to include zoological specimens. There is nothing to indicate that Dattan conducted any studies himself.

Collections, some of them quite large, were donated to the following museums:

- Naturhistorisches Museum, Braunschweig, Germany; this collection, donated in 1907, includes the skeleton of a Steller's sea cow, over 7 metres in length.
- Städtisches Museum (Braunschweig, Germany): an ethnological collection
- Museum of Ethnology (Dresden, Germany)
- Museum of Ethnology, Vienna, Austria
- National Museum of Ethnology (Leiden, Netherlands)
- Ethnographic collection of the University of Oslo (Norway)

=== Exile ===
At the beginning of World War I, some competitors of Kunst & Albers took advantage of an anti-German climate to spread slanderous rumours through the press that the company was involved in spying activities on behalf of Germany. This drove the company, which was already severely affected by the war between Russia and Germany, to the brink of ruin.

In October 1914, Adolph Dattan, after a search of his house, was imprisoned for nine days. He was then released without any charges being brought against him, but suddenly, in January 1915, by order of the Governor General, he was exiled to the village of Kolpashevo in the Tomsk Gouvernement of central Siberia. In 1917 he was given permission to move to Tomsk. During this time of exile Dattan, powerless to act, could only watch as his company fell apart. It was not until the winter of 1919-1920 that he managed to reach Vladivostok by rail through Siberia, then in the grips of civil war.

== Sources ==
- Lothar Deeg. Kunst und Albers Vladivostok: The History of a German Trading Company in the Russian Far East (1864–1924), trans. Sarah Bohnet. particularly: Dietrich Bernecker: „Adolph Wassilewitsch Dattan zum 150. Geburtstag“ (in the appendix). Berlin: epubli GmbH, 2013 ISBN 978-3-8442-5819-6
- Miz, Nelly. Sidorov, G. Andrej J, Turmov, Gennadi P. Russkii nemets Adolf Vasilevich Dattan, Vladivostok, 2002 (in Russian)
