= Park an der Ilm =

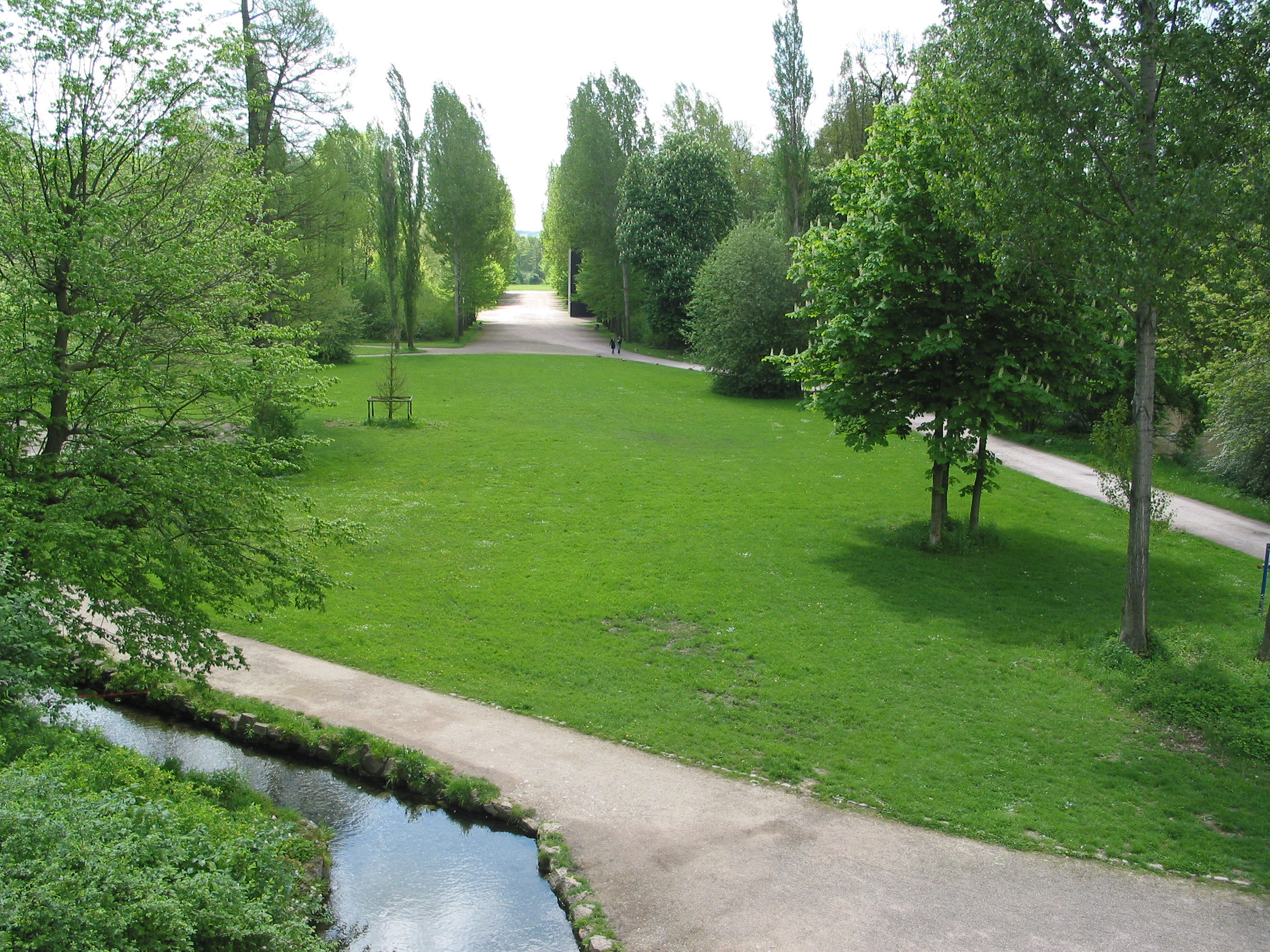
- View of the park from the Schlossbrücke
- Interactive map of Park an der Ilm
- Location: Weimar
- Coordinates: 50°58′23″N 11°20′11″E
- Created: 1778
- Designation: World Heritage Site "Classical Weimar"

The Park an der Ilm (Park on the Ilm, short Ilmpark) is a large Landschaftspark (landscaped park) in Weimar, Thuringia. It was created in the 18th century, influenced by Johann Wolfgang von Goethe, and has not been changed much, preserving a park of the period. It forms part of the World Heritage Site "Classical Weimar along with other sites across Weimar bearing testimony to the city's historical importance as a cultural hub during the Weimar Classicism movement in the late 18th and 19th centuries".

== Location ==
The park is located on both banks of the river Ilm for 1.0 kilometre (0.62 mi) from the Schloss in the north to the suburb of Oberweimar in the south. The park is part of a much longer greenway along the river, including the park of Schloss Belvedere in the north and the park of Schloss Tiefurt. The Park an der Ilm is divided into the Goethe-Park and the Dux-Garten.

== History ==
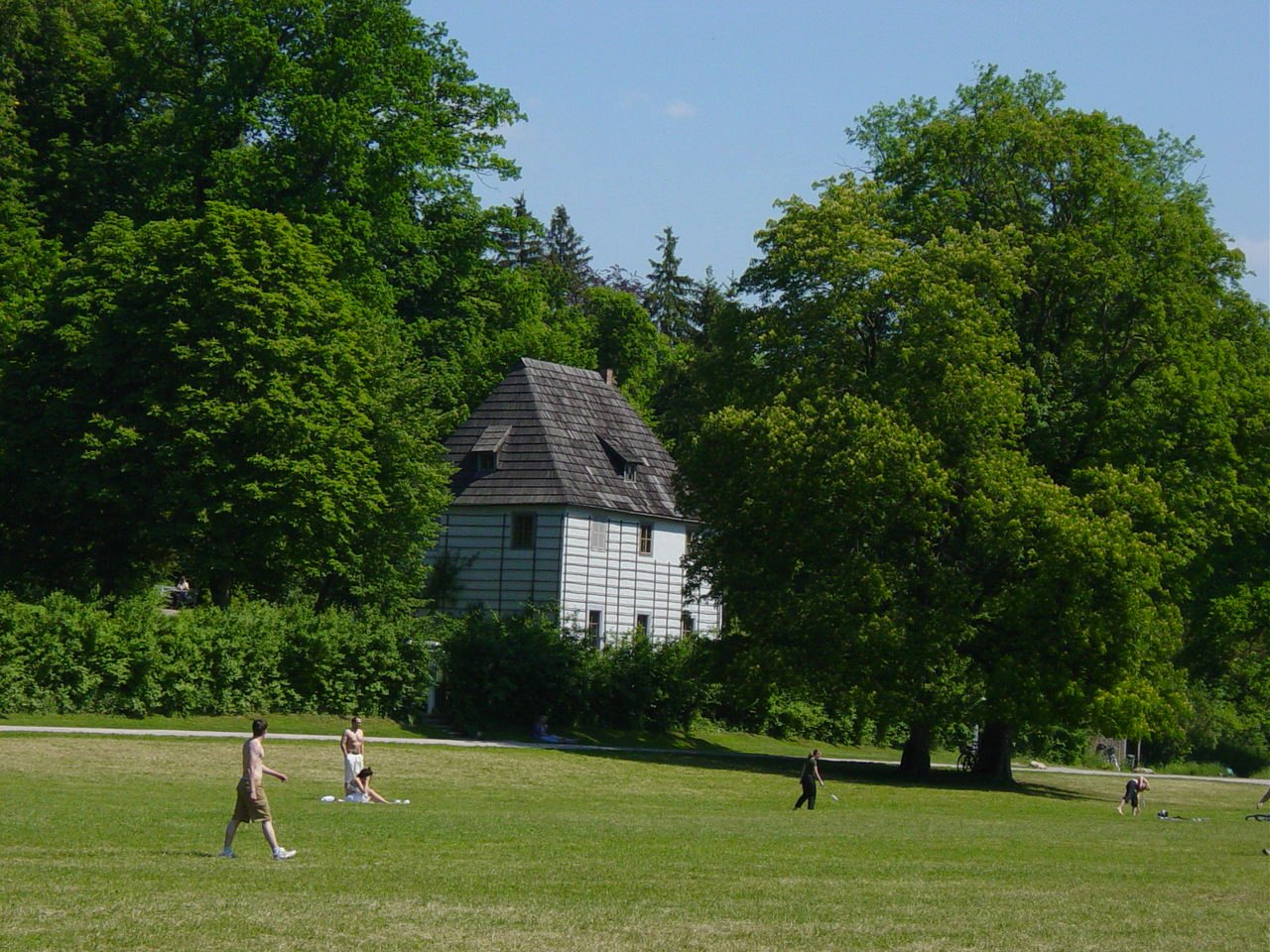
Goethe's garden house on the eastern slope of the park

Landscaping for the park began in 1778, influenced by Johann Wolfgang von Goethe, in the style of an English landscape garden, in modification of a Baroque garden. Goethe had purchased a garden house in the park in 1776, which now carries his name. The Wörlitz park, which Goethe had visited regularly from 1776 and which served as the setting of his 1809 novel Die Wahlverwandtschaften, was a model. After planting special trees from 1778, systematic work began in 1785. Goethe's house and the opposite Roman House (de) are among many architectural features of the park, including bridges and monuments. The design was finished in 1823 with the Tempelherrenhaus. A suspension bridge was built in 1833. From 1848 to 1852, court gardener Eduard Petzold created views to Goethe's garden house and the Roman house. A monument to Shakespeare was erected in 1904 by Otto Lessing on a commission of the Deutsche Shakespeare-Gesellschaft, founded in Weimar in 1864. Poets Louis Fürnberg, Adam Mickiewicz, Sándor Petőfi and Alexander Puschkin were also honoured by busts in the park.

The park contains valuable trees, mostly local varieties, but also some foreign trees, especially from North America. In 1993, 770 maples, 455 ash trees, 381 linden, 291 chestnuts and 257 hornbeams were counted, with an average age of 80 to 150 years at the time.

From 1969, the park was taken care of by Gartendirektion der Nationalen Forschungs- und Gedenkstätten der klassischen deutschen Literatur. Since 1998, it has become part of the World Heritage Site "Classical Weimar".

Park architecture

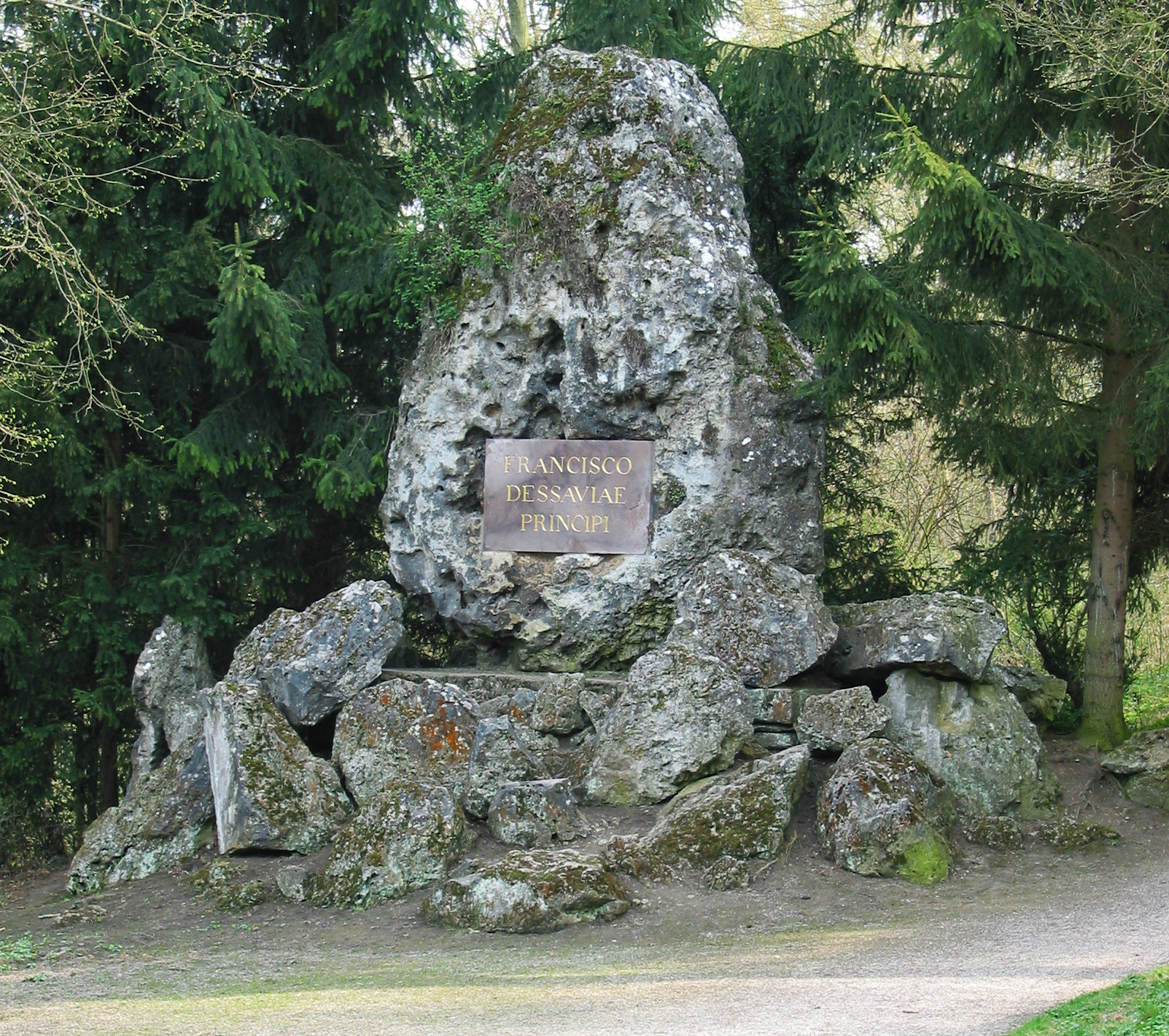
Dessauer Stein, 1782

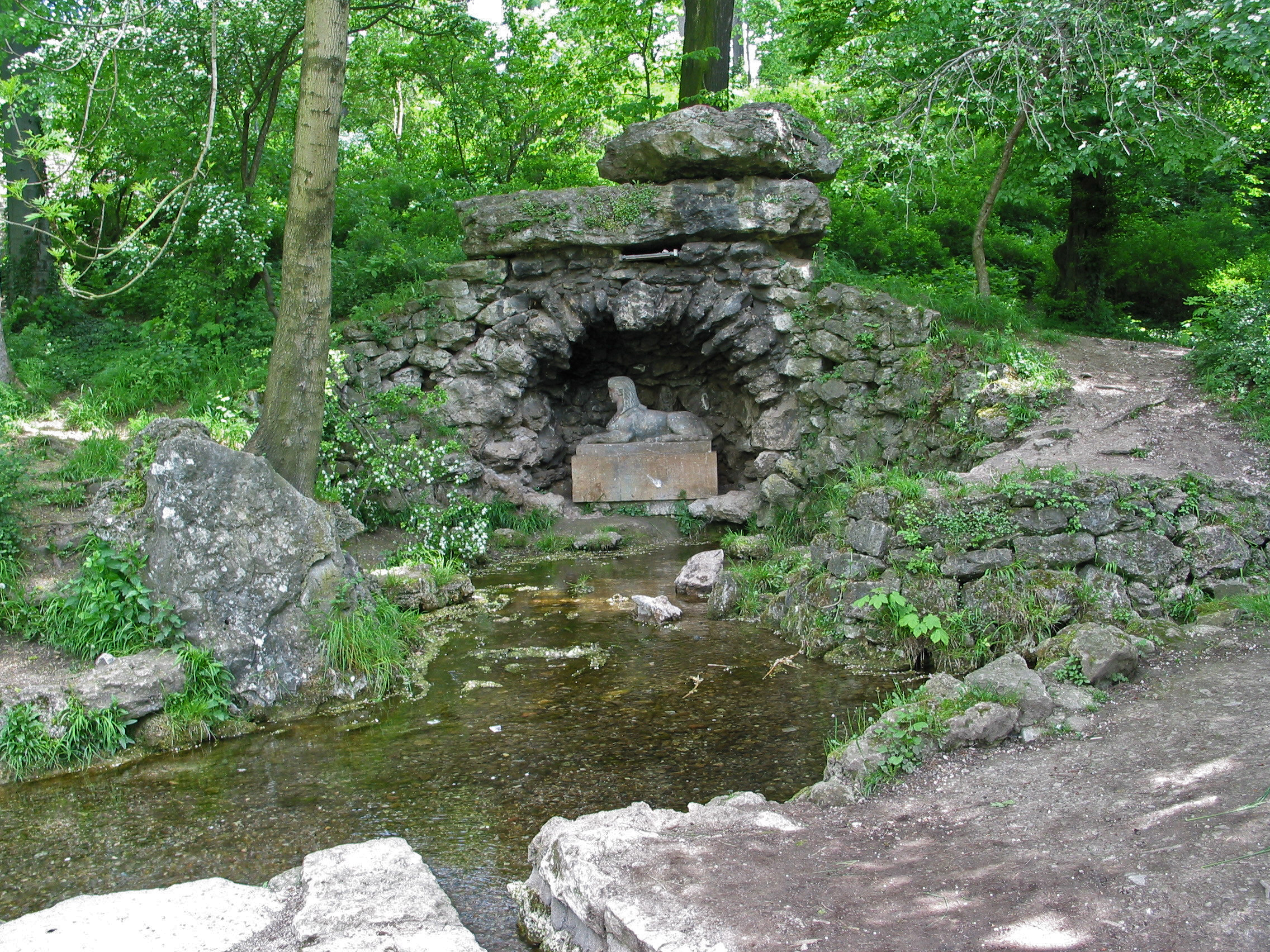
Sphinxgrotte, 1784–86

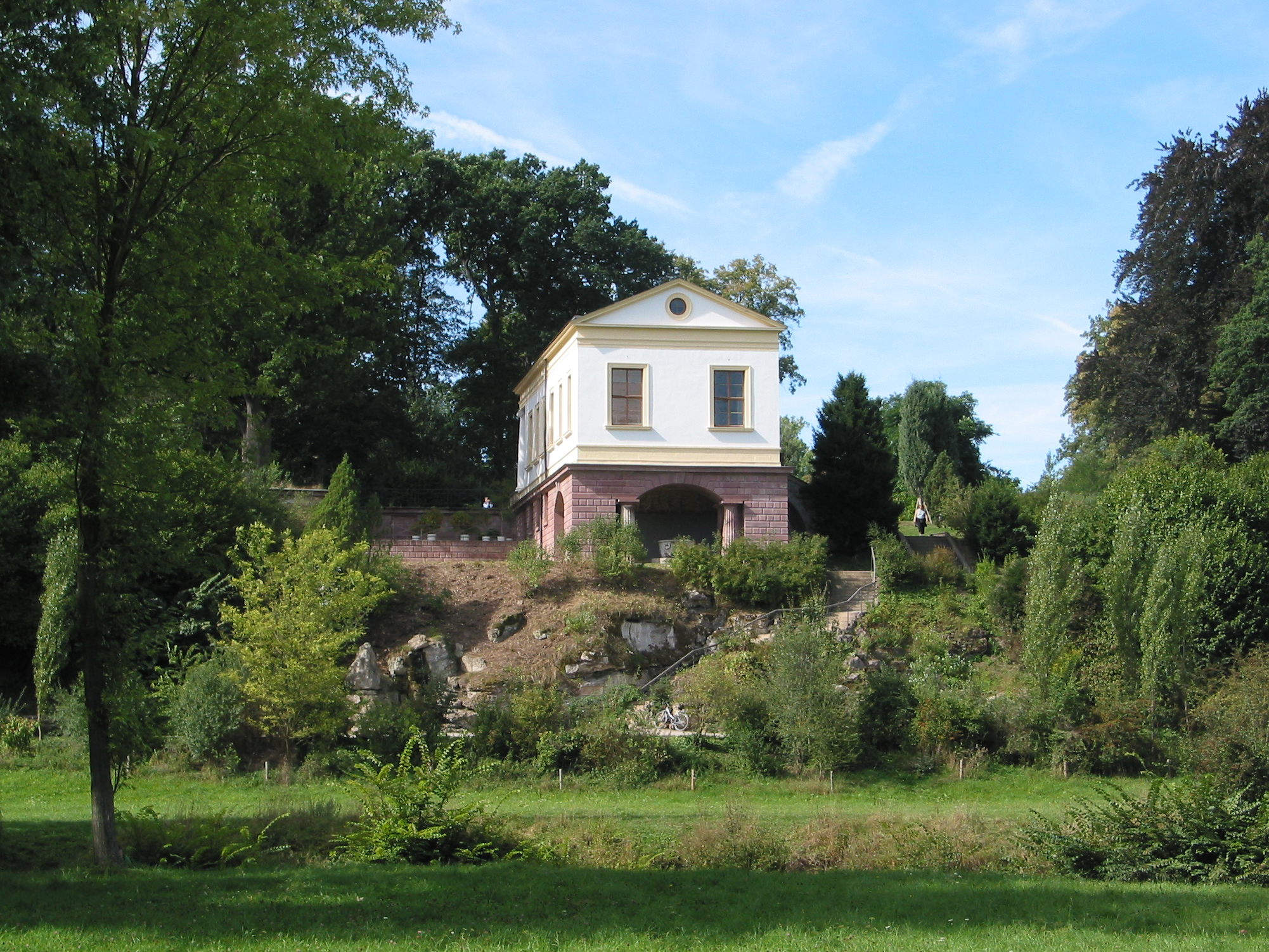
Roman House, 1791–98

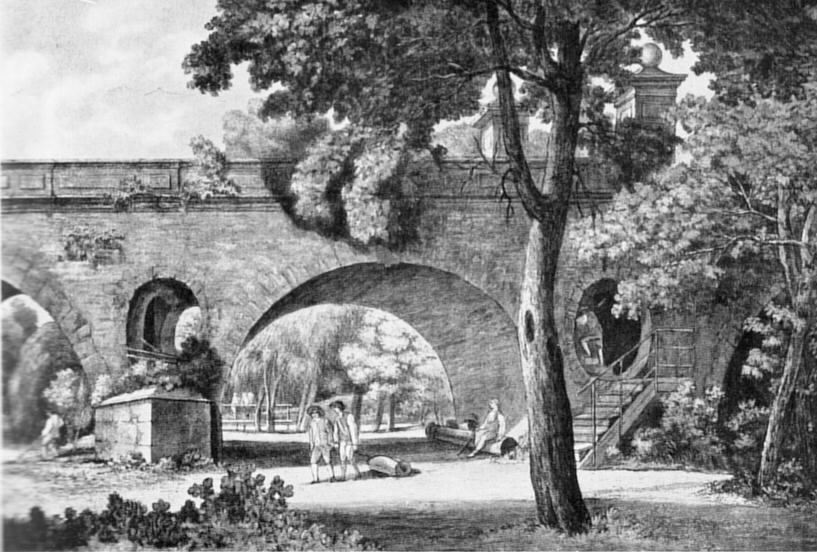
Sternbrücke, by Georg Melchior Kraus

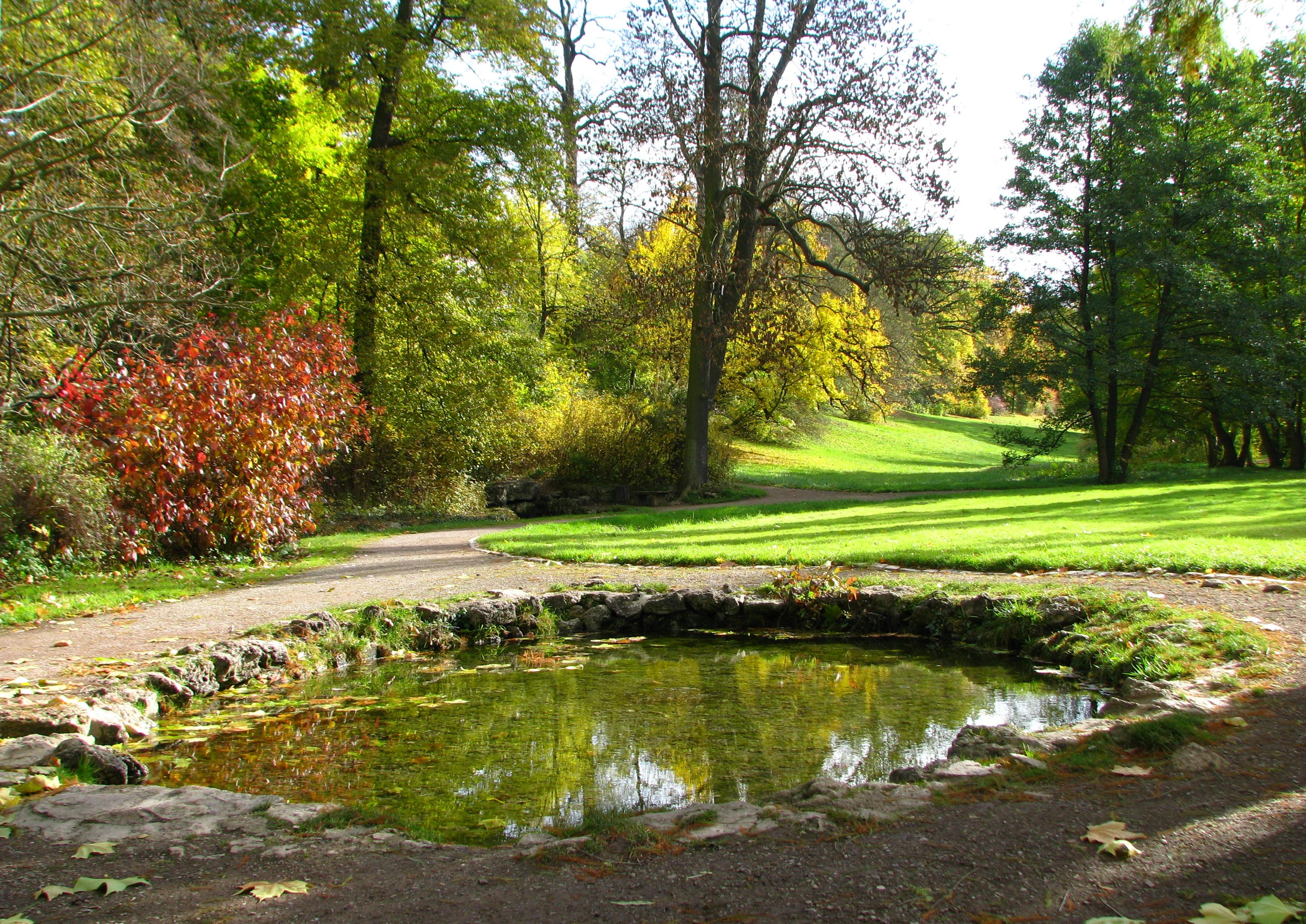
Ochsenauge, a Leutra source

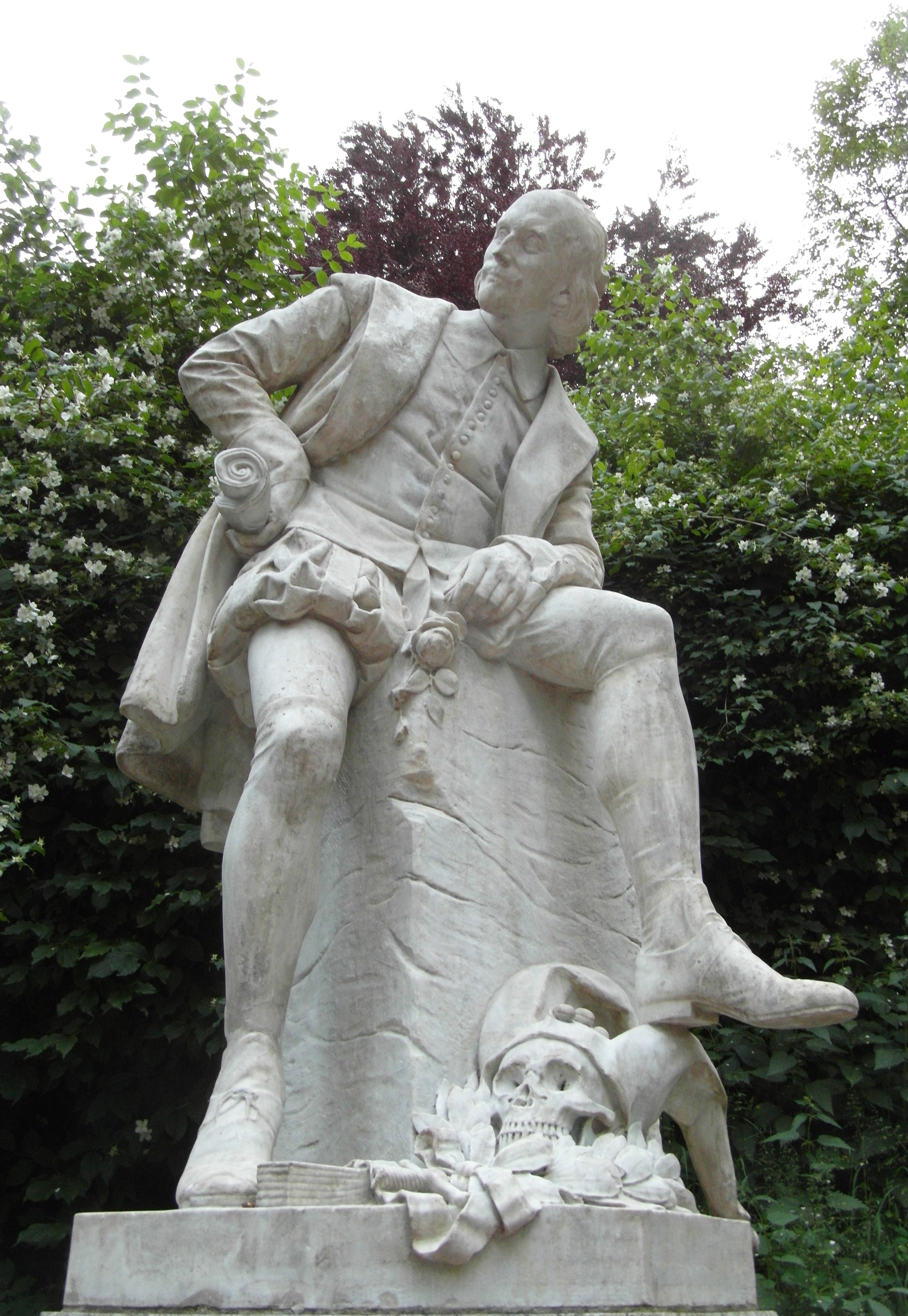
Shakespeare monument by Otto Lessing

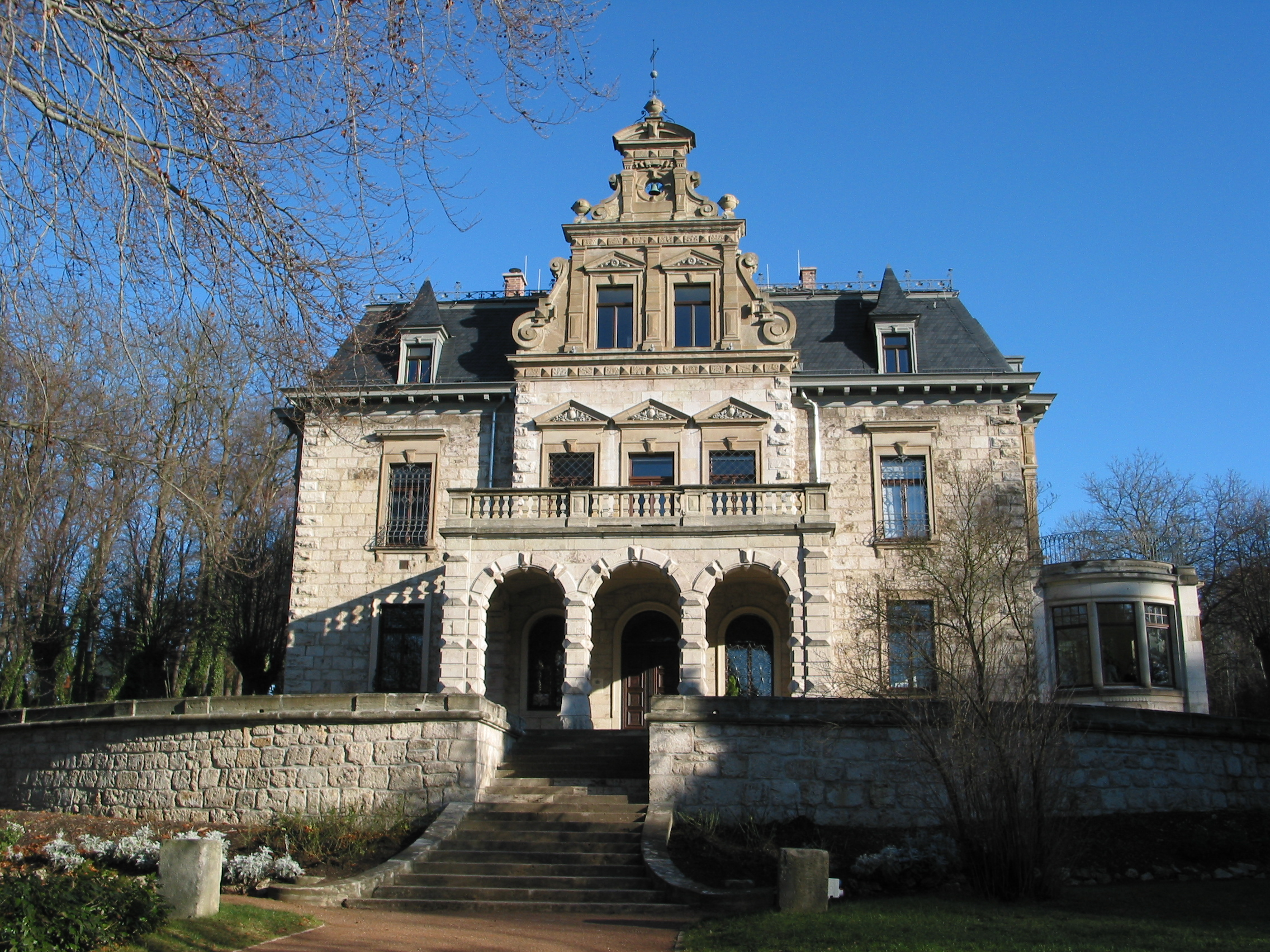
Villa Haar

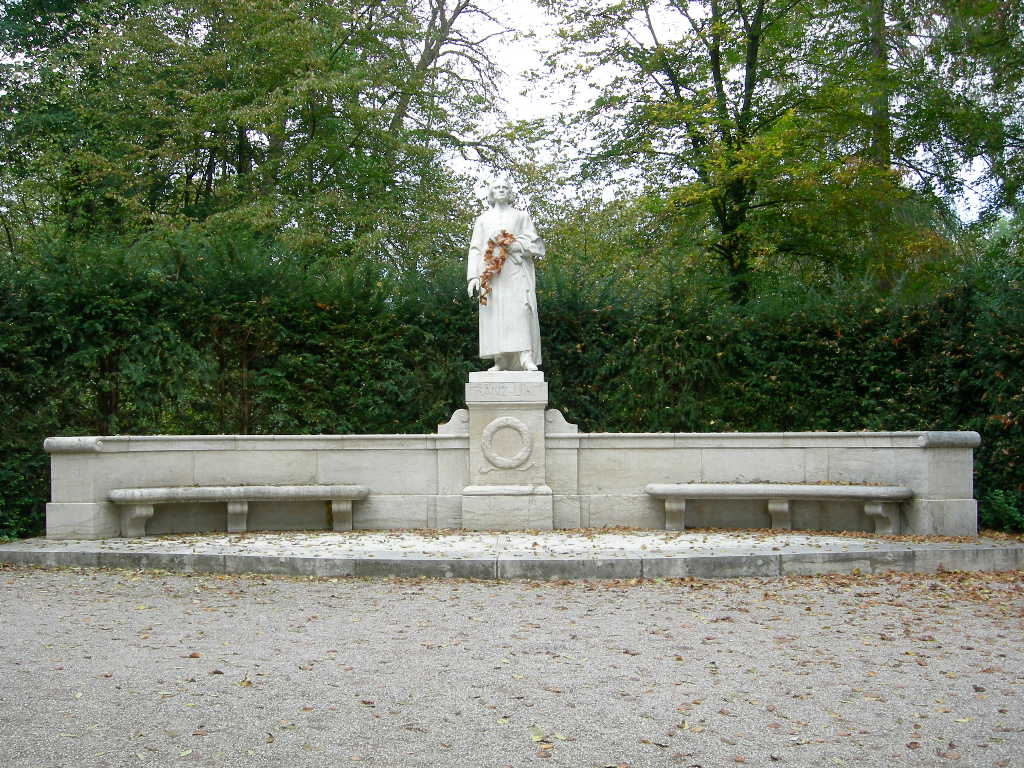
Liszt monument

== Literature ==
- Wolfgang Huschke: Die Geschichte des Parkes von Weimar. Weimar 1951.
- Susanne Müller-Wolff: Ein Landschaftsgarten im Ilmpark: Die Geschichte des herzoglichen Gartens in Weimar. Köln-Weimar-Wien 2007. ISBN 978-3-412-20057-2
- Georg Melchior Kraus: Aussichten und Parthien des Herzogl. Parks bey Weimar. Hrsg. von Ernst-Gerhard Güse und Margarete Oppel, Weimar 2006, ISBN 3-7443-0137-0.

== See also ==
- Klassik Stiftung Weimar
