= Max Meyer-Olbersleben =

German composer and pianist (1850-1927)

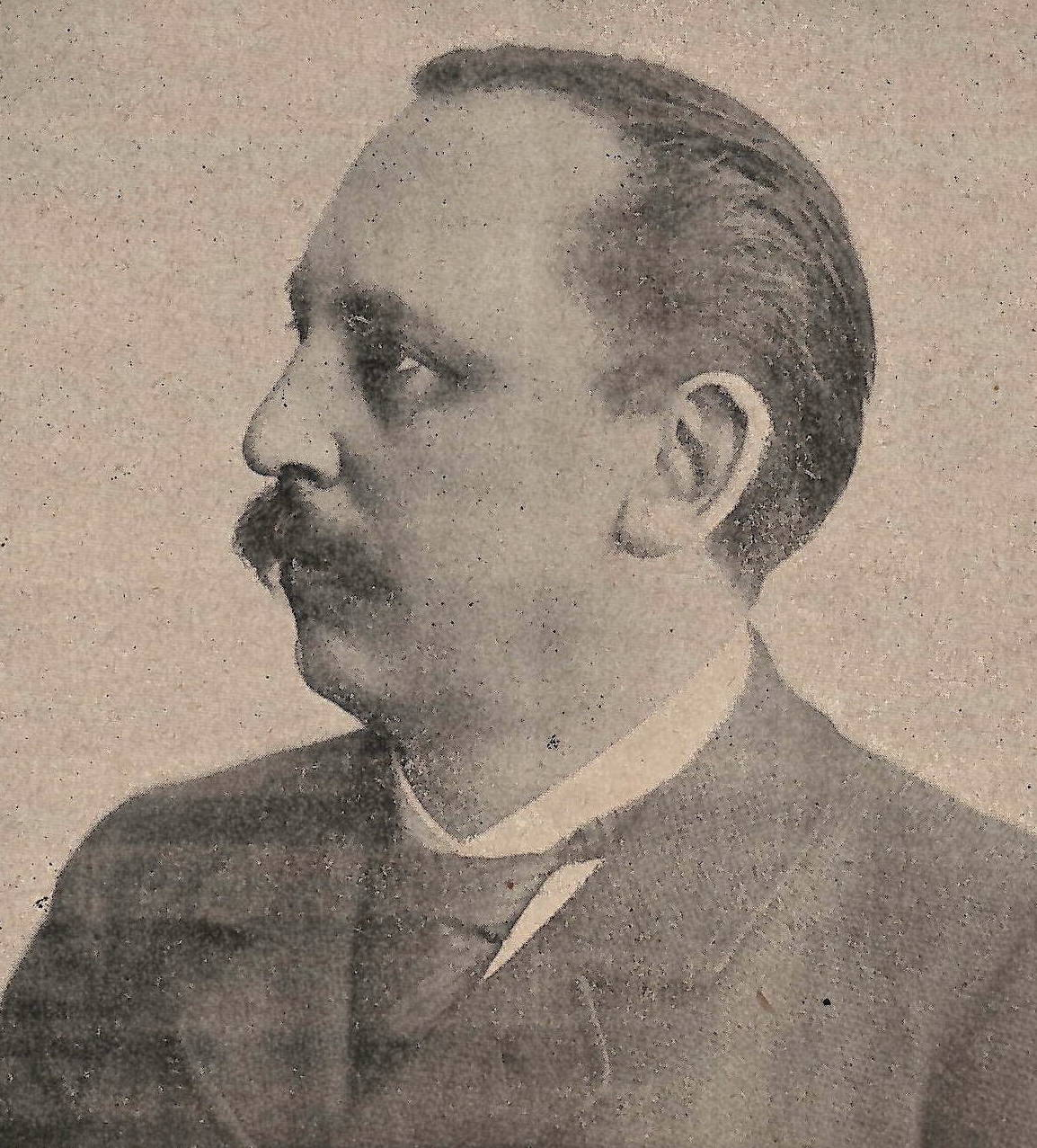
- Born: 5 April 1850; Olbersleben, Thuringia, Germany
- Died: 31 December 1927 (aged 77); Würzburg, Bavaria, Germany
- Occupations: Composer and pianist
- Children: 1; Ernst Ludwig Meyer-Olbersleben

Max Meyer-Olbersleben (5 April 1850 in Olbersleben – 31 December 1927 in Würzburg) was a German composer and pianist.

== Biography ==
Meyer-Olbersleben studied with Carl Müllerhartung and Franz Liszt at the Weimar Orchestra School, and with Josef Rheinberger, Franz Wüllner, and Peter Cornelius at the Munich Conservatory. After graduation, he became Professor of piano and theory in Weimar. Later, he was Professor of counterpoint and composition at the Bavarian State Conservatory of Music in Würzburg, and became its director from 1907 to 1920. Some notable students were Adolf Sandberger, Heinrich Steinbeck, Bernard Homola and Marc Roland. In addition, he conducted the Würzburg Liedertafel from 1879 and was Court Kapellmeister of Prince-Bishop of Würzburg.

Meyer-Olberleben became known primarily as a composer of songs and choral works.

His son is the composer Ernst Ludwig Meyer-Olbersleben.

== Selected works ==
Stage

- Clare Dettin, Opera in 3 acts, Op. 41 (1894)

Orchestral

- Feierklänge, Concert Overture, Op. 18 (1884)
- Fest-Ouverture, Op. 30 (1888)
- Sonnenhymnus, Tone Poem, Op. 90

Concertante

- Concerto in D major for viola and orchestra, Op. 112

Chamber music

- Piano Trio in E major, Op. 7 (1879)
- Sonata in C major for viola and piano, Op. 14 (1881)
- Fantasie-Sonate in A major for flute and piano, Op. 17 (1883)
- Elegische Sonate (Elegiac Sonata) for viola, cello and piano, Op. 113

Piano

- 4 Mazurken (4 Mazurkas), Op. 1 (1873)
- Schneeflocken, 6 Little Pieces for piano 4-hands, Op. 4
- Reise-Erinnerungen, 9 Pieces, Op. 6 (1879)
- 2 Balladen (2 Ballades), Op. 8
- Ballade in G♯ minor, Op. 9
- Albumblätter für kleine Leute (Album Leaves from Young People), 12 Piano Pieces, Op. 11 (1881)
- 2 Silhouetten (4 Silhouettes), Op. 13
- Aus launigen Stunden ..., 3 Pieces, Op. 19 (1885)
- Aus meinem Skizzenbuche ..., 3 Pieces, Op. 20
- Strombilder, 6 Pieces for piano 4-hands, Op. 21 (1885)
- Herr Frühling, Cycle of 7 piano pieces after a poem by Robert Prutz, Op. 22 (1885)
- Für Jung und Alt!, 10 Tanzweisen, Op. 24
- 3 Dichtungen for piano 4-hands, Op. 25 (1886)
- Zum Gedenken, 4 Pieces, Op. 28 (1888)
- Freudvoll und leidvoll, 7 Pieces after the poem by Johann Wolfgang von Goethe, Op. 32 (1890)
- Arabesken, 5 Pieces, Op. 42 (1895)

Choral

- 3 Lieder for mixed chorus, Op. 33 (1891)
- Das begrabene Lied for soprano, baritone, mixed chorus and orchestra, Op. 40 (1894)
- Der Blumen Rache for mixed chorus and orchestra, Op. 54 (1897); words by Ferdinand Freiligrath

Vocal

- 4 Lieder for voice and piano, Op. 12 (1881)
- 6 Lieder for voice and piano, Op. 16 (1884)
- Lied der Loreley: „Der Donner rollt um Berg und Thal“ for soprano and orchestra, Op. 26 (1887)
- 4 Lieder for voice and piano, Op. 55 (1897)
