= Classical Weimar (World Heritage Site) =

UNESCO World Heritage Site
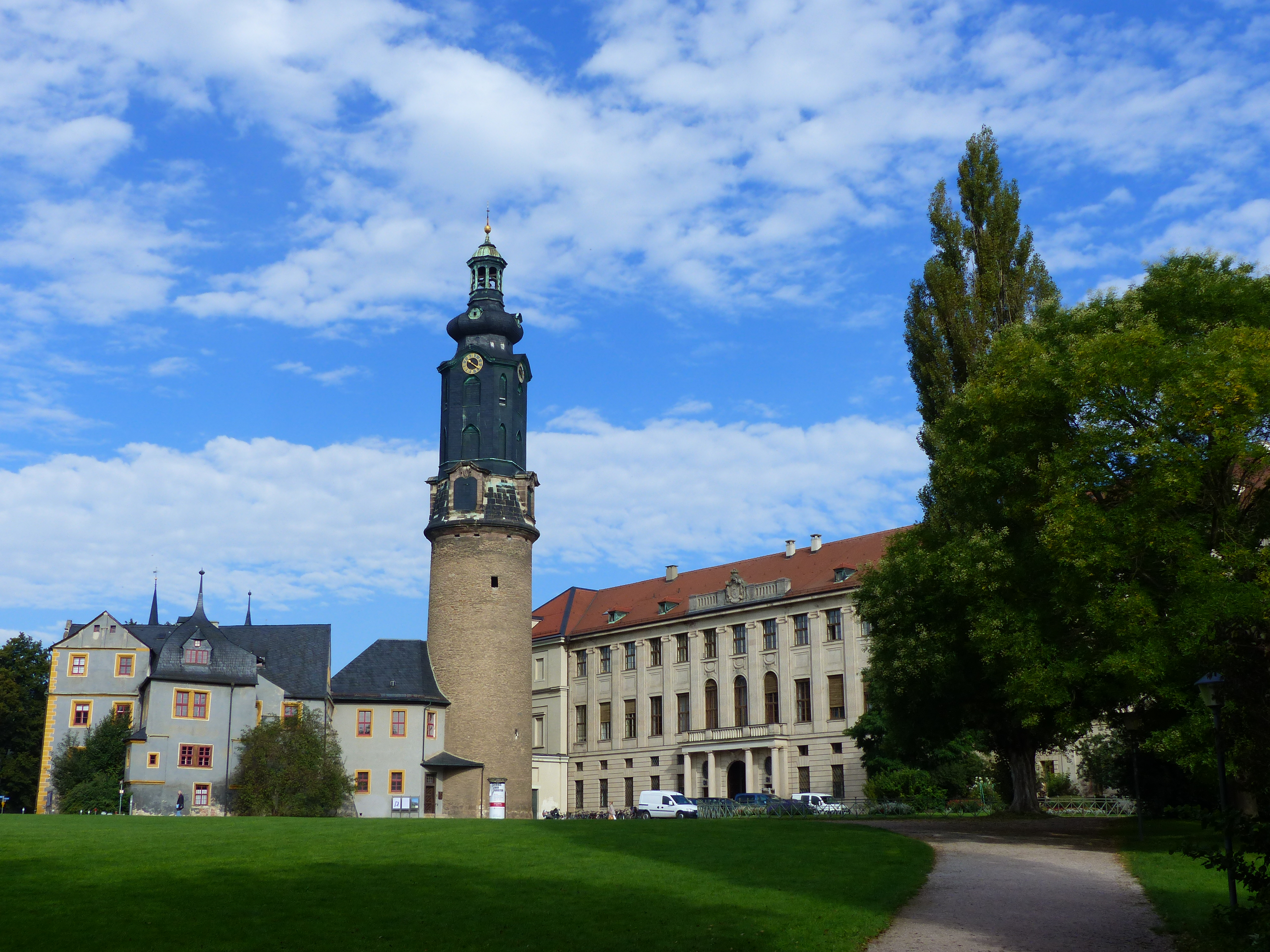
- Schloss Weimar (Residence Palace)

- Location within Germany Location within Thuringia
- Location: Weimar, Germany
- Includes: Schloss Belvedere, Goethe House, St. Peter und Paul, Herders residence, Duchess Anna Amalia Library, Historical Cemetery, Weimar, Park an der Ilm, Schillerhaus Weimar, Tiefurt House, Ettersburg Castle and Park, Schloss Weimar, Wilhelm-Ernst-Gymnasium, Wittumspalais
- Criteria: Cultural: (iii), (vi)
- Reference: 846
- Inscription: 1998 (22nd Session)
- Coordinates: 50°58′39″N 11°19′43″E

Classical Weimar (German: Klassisches Weimar) is a UNESCO World Heritage Site consisting of 11 sites located in and around the city of Weimar, Germany. The site was inscribed on 2 December 1998. The properties all bear testimony to the influence of Weimar as a cultural centre of the Enlightenment during the eighteenth and early nineteenth centuries. A number of notable writers and philosophers lived in Weimar between 1772 and 1805, including Johann Wolfgang von Goethe, Johann Gottfried Herder, Friedrich Schiller, and Christoph Martin Wieland. These figures ushered in and participated in the Weimar Classicism movement, and the architecture of the sites across the city reflects the rapid cultural development of the Classical Weimar era.

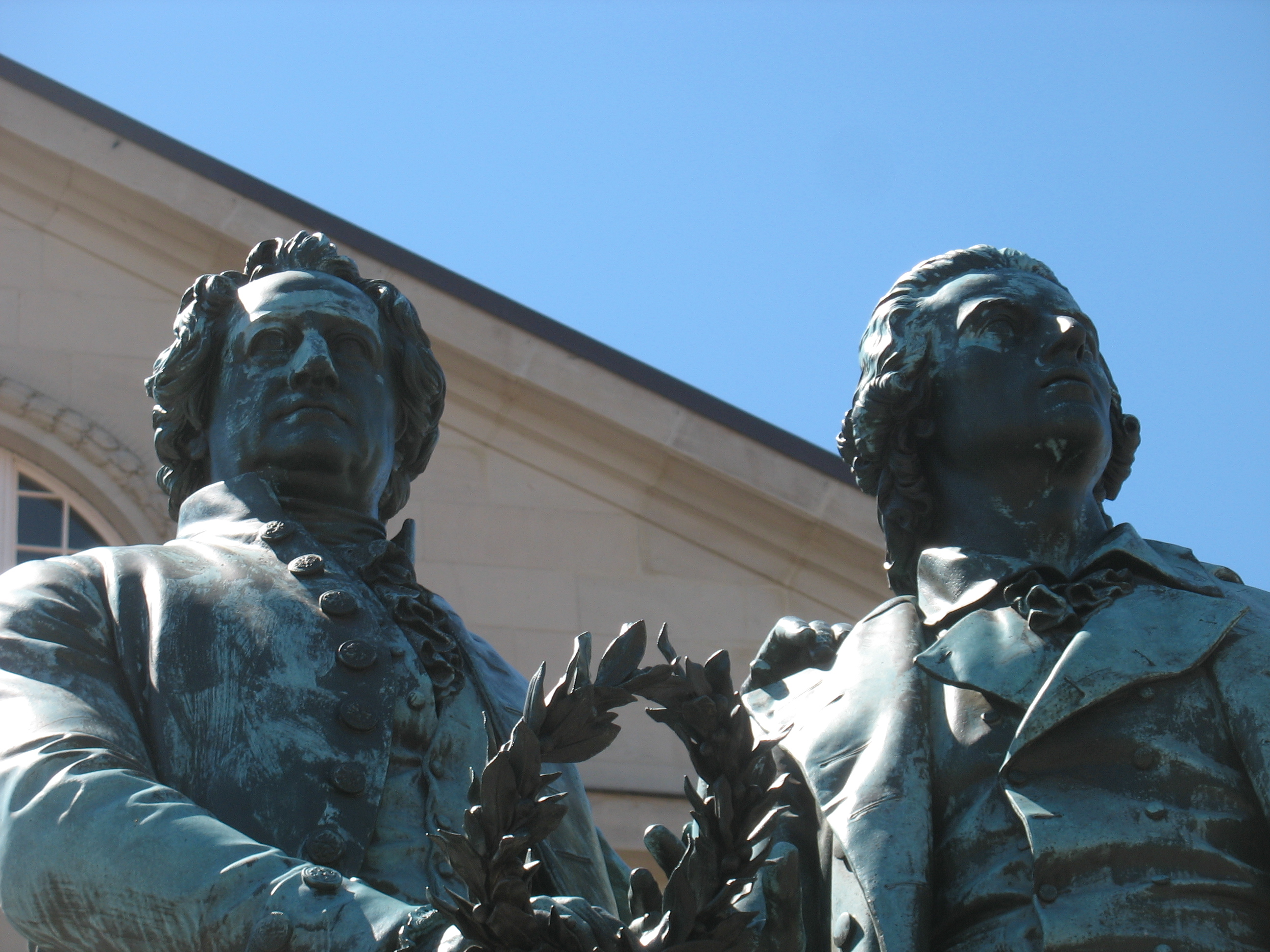
Statues of Goethe and Schiller

== Component sites ==
- Goethe's House, the home of Johann Wolfgang von Goethe, built in the Baroque style between 1707 and 1709, and Goethe´s Garden and Garden House in Park an der Ilm
- Schiller's House, also a Baroque-styled house, built in 1777, though incorporating a sixteenth-century outbuilding
- Herder Church (Church of St Peter and Paul), Herder House and Old High School, all associated with the philosopher, theologian and poet Johann Gottfried Herder (1774–1803).
- Schloss Weimar (Residence Castle) and Bastille ensemble
- The Dowager's Palace (Wittumspalais), consisting of a group of two- and three-storey Baroque buildings
- Duchess Anna Amalia Library
- Park on the Ilm with the Roman House
- Schloss Belvedere and Orangery a two-storey Baroque palace with a U-shaped orangery
- Schloss Ettersburg and Park, a four-storey structure consisting of three wings and a courtyard
- Schloss Tiefurt and Park, a stately home that was the summer residence of duchess Anna Amalia of Brunswick-Wolfenbüttel (1739–1807).
- Historical Cemetery, Weimar and the Princes' Tomb

== See also ==
- Klassik Stiftung Weimar
