= Ilse Knott-ter Meer =

German mechanical engineer (1899–1996)

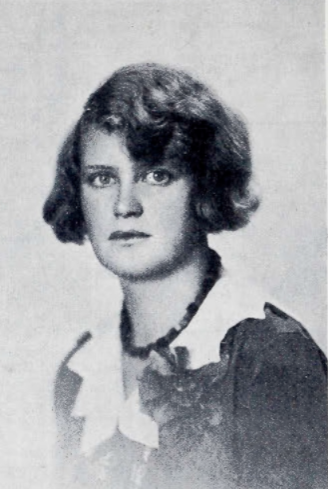
- Born: 14 October 1899; Hanover, German Empire
- Died: 3 November 1996 (aged 97); Rottach-Egern, Germany
- Occupation: Engineer
- Children: 2 sons (b. 1932 and 1935)
- Parent(s): Paula ter Meer (née Behrens) (mother), Gustav ter Meer (father)

Ilse Knott-ter Meer, born Ilse ter Meer, (14 October 1899 - 3 November 1996) was one of the first female German mechanical engineers with a degree in engineering.

== Early life ==
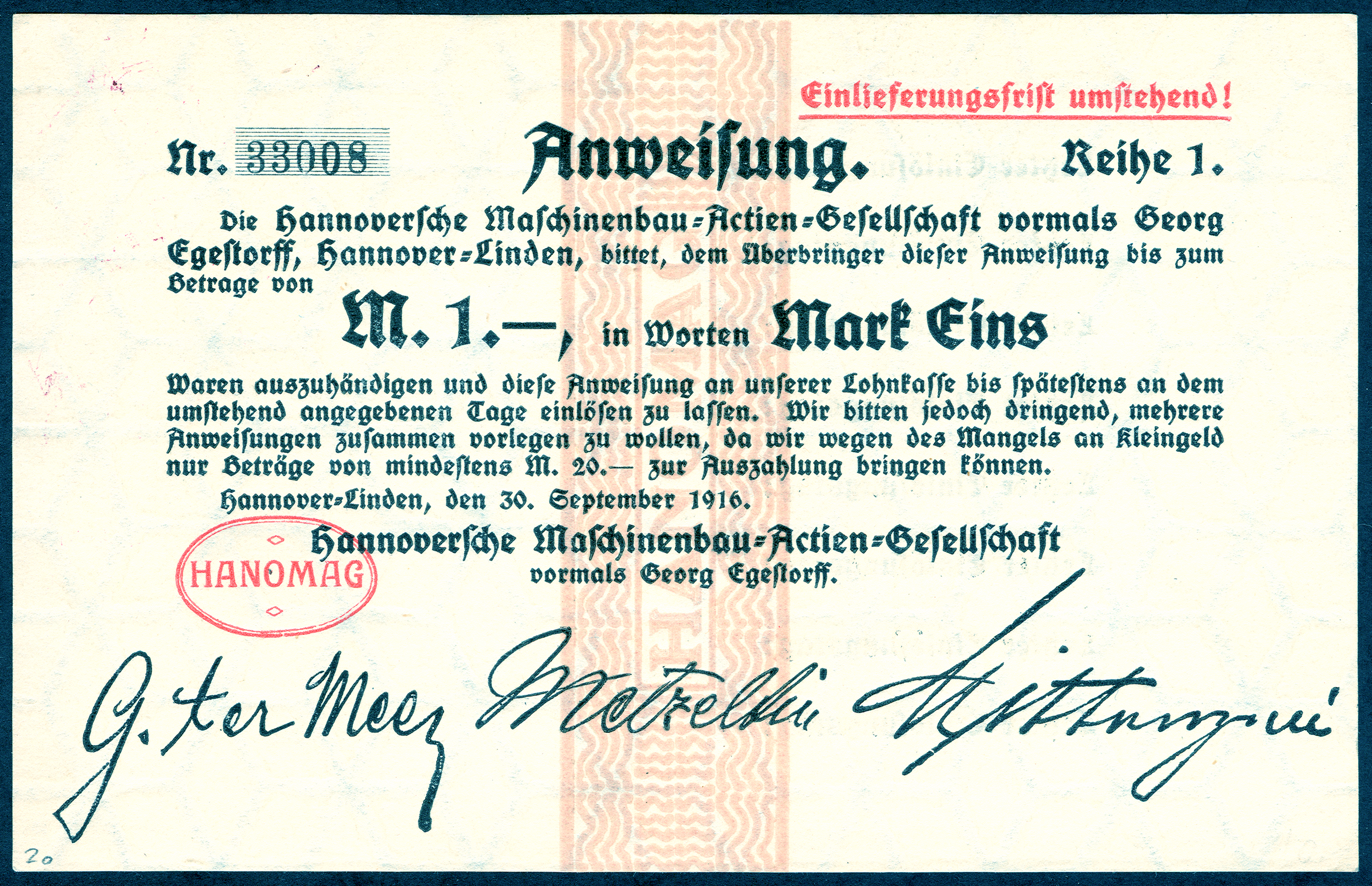
Hanomag's emergency money (Notgeld) from 1916 with signatures of father Gustav ter Meer, and railway engineer Erich Metzeltin

Ilse ter Meer was born on 14 October 1899 in Hanover. Her parents were engineer Gustav ter Meer (born 15 July 1860, one of 12 children of Edmund and Marie ter Meer) and Paula (née Behrens), daughter of a canvas manufacturer from Einbeck. Her paternal grandparents owned a jam factory in Klein-Heubach. Ilse had two younger siblings, a sister, Anneliese, and a brother, Hans.

Through her father, engineer Gustav ter Meer, Ilse ter Meer developed an interest in steam engines, cars and technology. He gave her a steam engine to play with as a child.

== Education ==
She completed her Abitur (secondary school education) at the Realgymnasium in Hanover (usually only attended by boys) and then studied mechanical engineering from 1919 to 1922 at the Technical University of Hanover and from 1922 to 1924 at the Technical University of Munich. Many male students objected to a woman student in the lecture halls and made their displeasure clear by stomping and whistling. But there were also fellow students who protected her against verbal harassment.

In 1924 Ilse ter Meer (with one other female student, Wilhelmine Vogler) completed her mechanical engineering degree at the Technical University of Munich. She wrote an article for the VDI News on road testing a Hanomag car with her sister, probably the Hanomag 2/10 PS.

== Career ==
In 1925 Ilse ter Meer married the electrical engineer Carl Knott, becoming known as Ilse Knott-ter Meer and the couple moved to Aachen, where she ran her own office. She represented the patents on centrifugal wastewater treatment machines that her engineer father, Gustav ter Meer, had developed as a director at Hanomag. The same year Knott-ter Meer became the first female member of the Verein Deutscher Ingenieure (VDI), the Association of German Engineers.

During this time she worked as a freelancer and accompanied her husband on trips. In 1929 she joined the British Women's Engineering Society (WES), at the time the only women's engineering organisation in the world. The next year she wrote an article on Sanitary Engineering and the part it plays in maintaining heath in towns and cities for The Woman Engineer journal. In 1930, she was elected to the WES Council to represent German women engineers, at the same time that Elsa Gardner became the representative for America.

In the 1930s, Knott-ter Meer worked at Siemens & Halske in Berlin, and gave birth to two sons (one in 1932 and the second in 1935). During the World Power Conference in Berlin in 1930, she organised the first ever formal meeting of German female engineers in conjunction with fellow engineer Käthe Böhm at which Caroline Haslett spoke about the Women's Engineering Society and the Electrical Association for Women, British organisations keen to build international links to benefit women through engineering and technology. Leading American engineer Kate Gleeson also attended the meeting. By 1933, there were as many as 618 female mechanics and engineers registered in Germany. For some women engineers, such as fellow WES members Asta Hampe and Ira Rischowski, the changes in the political landscape as the Nazi party came to power meant that their careers were badly affected, as some women and those with Jewish heritage were sacked from their jobs. During this period the VDI became heavily Nazified.

Knott-ter Meer continued to work at Siemens & Halske through the Nazi era. Details about her work during this time are sketchy.

In 1950, Knott-ter Meer was living in Nurenburg. From 1956 she was a member of the advisory board of the VDI specialist group VDI-Fachgruppe Haustechnik (a committee on domestic technology) and headed the office of the general agency of a US electrical appliance manufacturer.

In 1960 she was one of the six founders of Frauen im Ingenieurberuf, the women's arm of the VDI. In 1964, she represented the Federal Republic of Germany in the first International Conference of Women Engineers and Scientists (ICWES) in New York, and attended the second conference in held in Cambridge in 1967. At the VDI, she gave lectures on household technology and worked on the REFA (the Association for Work Studies and Business) committee on housekeeping.

== Awards ==
In 1975, Knott-ter Meer was awarded the VDI gold medal for 50 years’ of membership, alongside her husband Carl Knott. They were the first married couple to receive the awards. In June 1983, She attended the Women's Engineering Society's AGM and was awarded Honorary Membership of the organisation, alongside aeronautical engineer Beatrice Shilling and metallurgist Sir Monty Finneston.

== Retirement and death ==
In 1987 her husband Carl Knott died after 62 years of marriage. She spent her last years in the Rupertihof residential complex in Rottach-Egern, where in her nineties she kept up to date on electrical engineering and electronics through specialist magazines.

She died in Rottach-Egern on 3 November 1996. Her urn was buried alongside her husband on 18 November 1996.

== Commemoration ==
- In 1998 Ilse-ter-Meer-Weg (Ilse-ter-Meer Way) in the Ahrberg district in Hanover's Linden-Süd was named in her honour.
- Ilse Knott-ter Meer Haus (IK Haus), which offers accommodation for students at the Maschinenbau Garbsen campus of Leibniz University Hanover is named after her.
- The new Audimax at the main site of the Technical University of Munich in Arcisstrasse is also named in honour of Ilse Knott-ter Meer.

== See also ==
- Cécile Butticaz, first European female engineering graduate.
- Asta Hampe, a German female electrical engineer, mechanical engineer, physicist, statistician, economist
