= Tempelherrenhaus, Weimar =

Venue in Park an der Ilm, Weimar, Germany

Tempelherrenhaus
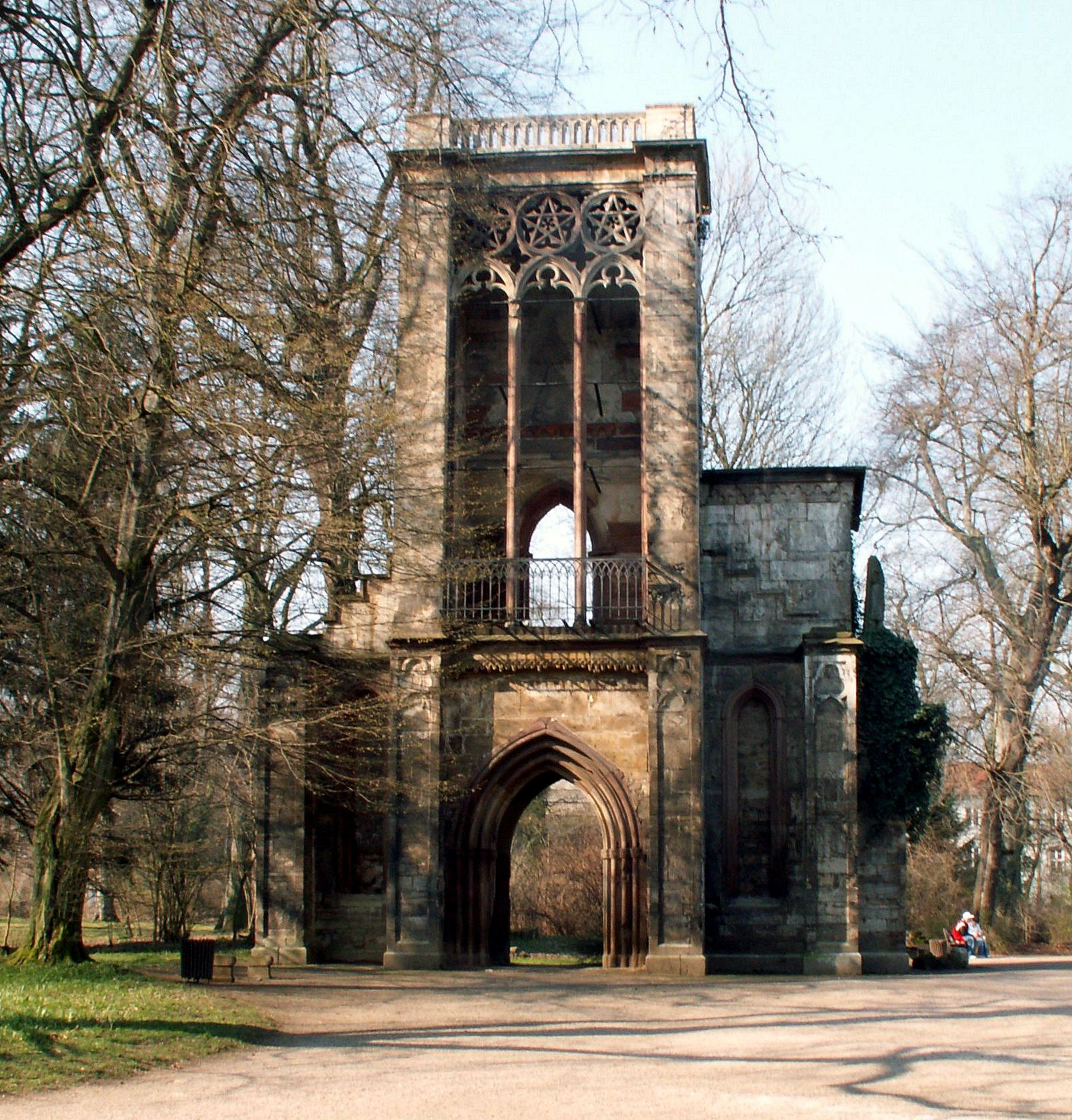
- The ruins of the former venue at the Park an der Ilm

- Location within Germany

General information
- Location: Weimar, Germany
- Coordinates: 50°58′33″N 11°19′56″E
- Renovated: 18th century
- Destroyed: 1945

Tempelherrenhaus (House of the Templers) was a venue in Park an der Ilm, Weimar, Germany, which emerged in the 18th century. It was ruined during a bombing during the Second World War.

== History ==
When the Park an der Ilm was developed in the 1780s, the former Welsche Garten was included in the park. An old greenhouse, the Alte Orangerie, was converted to a romantic lounge in the park for the ducal court. The conversion was based on a design by Johann Friedrich Rudolf Steiner (de). It is located near the Roman House. It was used for social events, small receptions, exhibitions and concerts.

The upper corners of the roof were adorned in 1788 by court sculptor Martin Gottlieb Klauer, who created four wooden life-size sculptures representing Templar knights. The name of the house, derived from them, came in use around 1820. The wooden statues were replaced in 1818 by sandstone statues by Johann Peter Kaufmann.

In March 1945, the end of the Second World War, the house was destroyed by a bomb attack on the town. All that remained was the 1816 tower. Only one torso of a Templar figure remained in place. The other three are located in the basement of the Roman house, in an exhibition of the history of the Park an der Ilm. The tower was restored in 1998.
