= Asta Hampe =

German engineer and statistician

- Aste Hampe in 1935
- Born: Asta Hampe; 24 May 1907; Helmstedt, German Empire
- Died: 22 October 2003 (aged 96); Hamburg, Germany (presumably)
- Education: Klosterschule (the first female high school in Hamburg), Technischen Hochschule München, Technische Universität Berlin, Universität Hamburg
- Occupations: Electrical engineer, mechanical engineer, physicist, statistician, economist
- Employers: Barmbek Hospital (Krankenhaus Barmbek), Philips-Valvo, Nachrichtenmittel-Versuchskommando der Kriegsmarine, Universität Hamburg, Exportfirma Kunst & Albers
- Partner: Andy Röper (librarian)
- Parent(s): Emmy Busch, Hans Hampe

Asta Hampe (24 May 1907 – 22 October 2003) was a German electrical engineer, mechanical engineer, physicist, economist, and statistician. According to The Woman Engineer, Hampe was the first German member of the Women's Engineering Society, which she joined in 1929.

== Early life and education ==
Asta Hampe was born on 24 May 1907 in Helmstedt, one of four children of Hans Hampe and Emmy Busch owners of the Hampe worsted spinning mill (founded in 1823) and the Friedrich Hampe soap factory. She had two sisters, and her older brother was reported as missing in action in the First World War. As a child, her father and uncle encouraged her to get involved in the family businesses.

In 1924, Hampe began to tinker with a small radio set, which she had found the plan for in a trade journal. Fascinated by the new technology, she announced her intention to become an engineer, although her father did not approve, expecting her to learn to type then get married.

Asta Hampe's secondary education was at the Klosterschule, Hamburg, where she graduated in 1926. She then attended the Technische Hochschule, Munich, where she studied physics and engineering, and was one of five women among 500 male students.

After preliminary exams and company internships, she transferred to Technische Hochschule in Berlin to study telecommunications engineering. The 200-300 male students were more welcoming to the three female students than in Munich. While still a student there, Hampe founded the Gemeinschaft Deutscher Ingenieurinnen (Association of German Women Engineers). She took her Diplom-Hauptprüfung in the field of telecommunications engineering from the mechanical engineering department in 1931. Between 1929 and 1935, she improved her English language skills during stays abroad in London, Exeter and Sheffield.

Her further studies were financially supported by her grandfather and uncle.

== Career ==
=== Engineering ===
Hampe went on to work as an assistant at the Research Laboratory at Friedrich Krupp AG, in Essen. Following the rise of the Nazi party to power in 1933, women's rights began to be suppressed and she was fired from her job at Barmbek Hospital for being a woman, with the dismissal stating that "Physics is no profession for a woman, therefore, Hampe must be dismissed".

Hampe then joined the East Asia export company Kunst & Albers as a supply engineer. In 1938, she wrote to the Women's Engineering Society about her position at Philips' radio. During the Second World War, Hampe was recruited to work as a physicist for the Kriegsmarine at the Nachrichtenmittel-Versuchskommando in Kiel. She undertook the laboratory work, and a man would field test it for her which always annoyed her.

=== Economics ===
In 1943, she returned to Hamburg and began her second career in economics at the University of Hamburg. After the end of the Second World War, with the process of reorganisation and denazification, Hampe's expertise is thought to have made it simpler to continue her career. In 1947, she received her doctorate for her dissertation on "The Influence of War-Related Building Destruction on Urban Land Credit". She became a staff member in important housing associations and, from 1951, assistant to Prof. Dr. Albert von Mühlenfels and a lecturer in statistics at the University of Hamburg.

In 1957, Hampe habilitated (post doctoral work) with the economic theory paper: 'Die freie Mietpreisbildung'. She then became an associate professor at the University of Hamburg. In 1962, she was awarded the newly created chair of 'Economic Statistics' at the Faculty of Law and Political Science at Philipps University in Marburg. There she had the unique opportunity to completely rebuild this subject, which she did with passion. A generation of economists was shaped by her.

From 1968-69, she held a professor position at the Philips University in Marburg.

== Membership of the Women's Engineering Society ==
Hampe became a member of the Women's Engineering Society (WES) in 1929, becoming the society's first German member. Hampe was an active WES member, She provided a listing for herself in the 1935 Register of Women Engineers and, in the same year, attended the thirteenth annual conference for the society speaking to delegates about her experiences as an engineer in Germany. In response to the toast by Amy Johnson (under her married name Mrs. J Mollison) to women engineers across the world, Hampe is reported to have outlined some of the changes for women in engineering in Germany following the election of the National Socialist party, though mostly there were training opportunities for women and some employment options. In The Woman Engineer in 1986, there is a listing for Professor Dr. Asta Hampe as a full member.

== See also ==
- Ilse Knott-ter Meer, the first German female mechanical engineer
