= Ellersleben =

- Ortsteil of Buttstädt
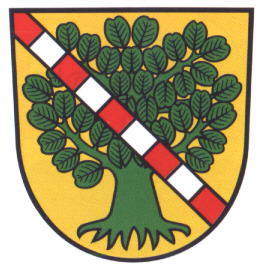
- Coat of arms
- Interactive map of Ellersleben
- Location within Germany Location within Thuringia
- Coordinates: 51°8′N 11°19′E
- Country: Germany
- State: Thuringia
- District: Sömmerda
- Municipality: Buttstädt

Area
  - Total: 6.48 km^{2} (2.50 sq mi)
- Elevation: 154 m (505 ft)

Population (2017-12-31)
  - Total: 253
  - Density: 39.0/km^{2} (101/sq mi)
- Time zone: UTC+01:00 (CET)
  - Summer (DST): UTC+02:00 (CEST)
- Postal codes: 99628
- Dialling codes: 036372

Ellersleben (German pronunciation: [ˈɛlɐsˌleːbn̩]) is a village and a former municipality in the Sömmerda district of Thuringia, Germany. Since 1 January 2019, it is part of the municipality Buttstädt.
