= St. Peter und Paul, Weimar =

Church in Weimar, Germany

St. Peter und Paul (Herderkirche)
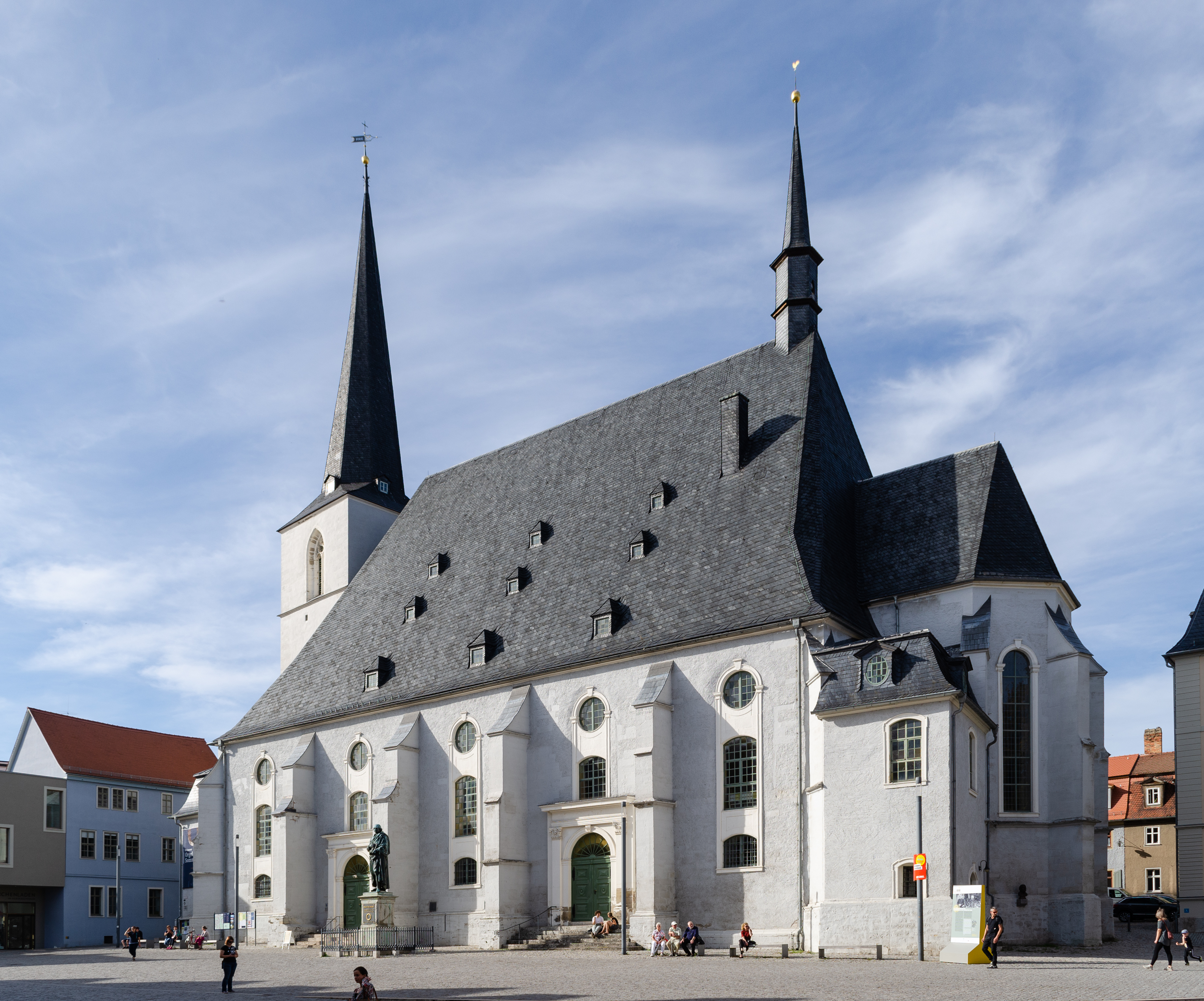
- St. Peter und Paul, from the southeast

Religion
- Affiliation: Lutheran
- Ecclesiastical or organisational status: Parish church of the Church in Middle Germany

Location
- Location: Weimar, Germany
- Interactive map of St. Peter und Paul (Herderkirche)
- Coordinates: 50°58′52″N 11°19′45″E

Architecture
- Type: Hall church
- Style: Gothic
- UNESCO World Heritage Site
- Official name: Classical Weimar
- Type: Cultural
- Criteria: iii, vi
- Designated: 1998
- Reference no.: 846
- State Party: Germany
- Region: Europe and North America

Website
- www.ek-weimar.de

St. Peter und Paul, Weimar

The church of St Peter and Paul in Weimar, Germany, is also known as Herderkirche (Herder Church) after Johann Gottfried Herder. It is the most important church building of the town, and is called Stadtkirche (town church), opposed to the courtly Schloßkirche (court chapel). It has been the church of a Lutheran parish since 1525, after the Reformation. The church is part of the World Heritage Site Classical Weimar, together with other sites affiliated with the Weimar Classicism movement. Inscribed on the World Heritage List in 1998, these sites bear testimony to the cultural importance of Weimar during the late 18th and 19th centuries and the outstanding architecture that arose in response to the cultural values of the time.

== History ==
The first church was built on the same location from 1245 to 1249, but destroyed by fire in 1299. Only the foundations remain. The second building was badly damaged in the 1424 town fire. The present building dates back to the a hall church in late Gothic style, built between 1498 and 1500. The choir served as the burial place of members of nobility of the House of Wettin in the Ernestine duchies. The church has been Lutheran since 1525, and Martin Luther gave sermons there.

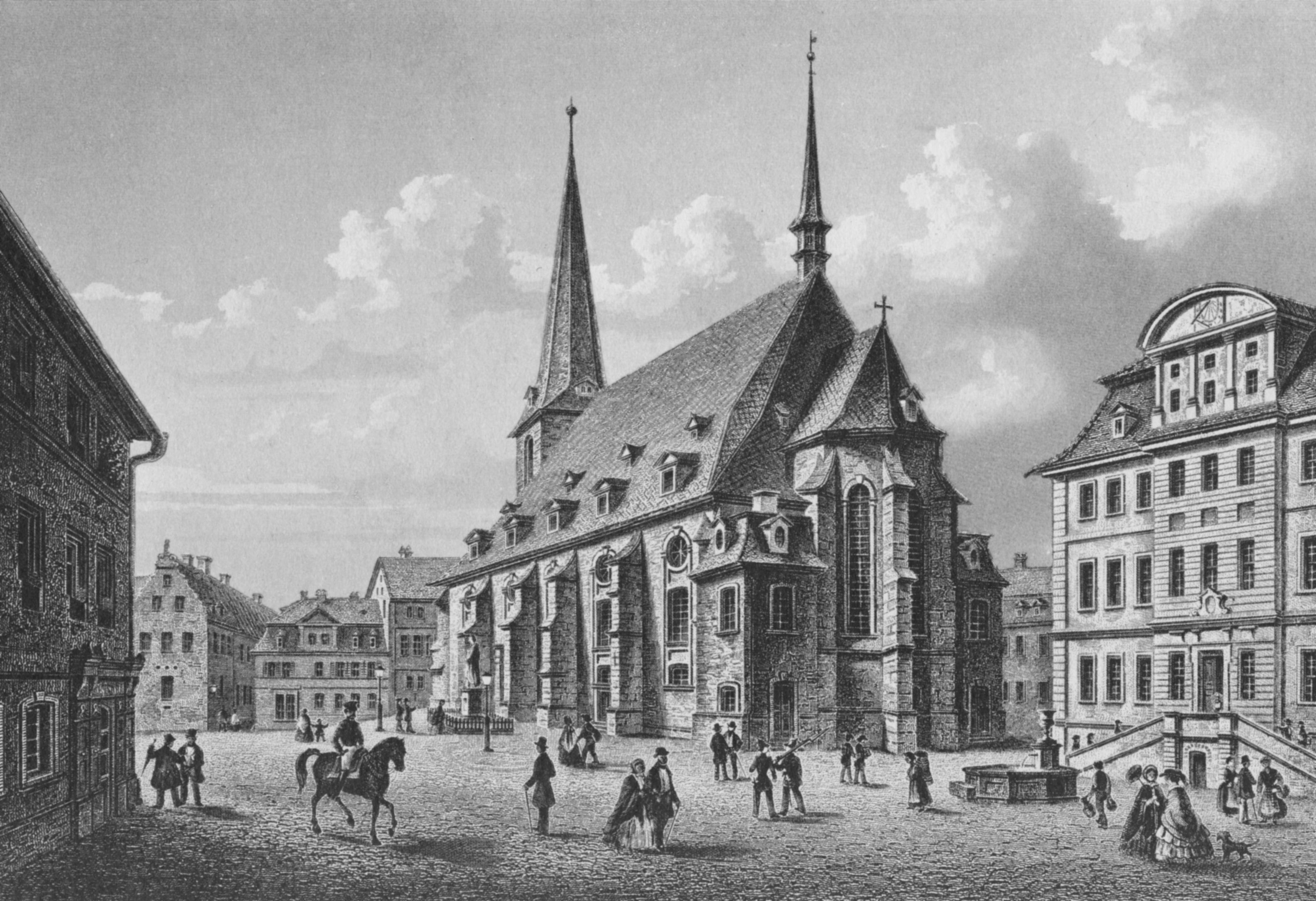
Herderplatz from the southeast, steel engraving by L. Oeder, c.1840)

The ducal family evidently attended services not only in the small Schloßkirche, but also in the town church. John Eliot Gardiner suggests that Bach cantatas using a festive orchestra were first performed there, including his first cantata for Christmas, Christen, ätzet diesen Tag, BWV 63 and Der Himmel lacht! Die Erde jubilieret, BWV 31 for the Easter Sunday of 1715, scored for soloists, a five-part choir and three instrumental groups. Bach frequently played the organ, and two of his sons were baptized in the church.

The church is often called "Herderkirche" after the famous theologian and philosopher Johann Gottfried Herder, who worked from in 1776 until his death in 1803 as general superintendent. He is buried in the church. In 1807, the Duchess Anna Amalia, who venerated the philosopher, was also buried there. The square in front of the church was named after Herder when the Herder Memorial was established in 1850.

Towards the end of the Second World War, the church was severely damaged by bombing on 9 February 1945. The pitched roof and the wooden vaults were largely destroyed, the remaining stone vaults in the eastern portions collapsed. The entire interior was badly affected. The church was opened again after reconstruction on 14 June 1953. The repair and restoration of the interior was performed until 1977.

== Features ==
Not much is left of the original Gothic interior, the baptismal font, the stairs to the pulpit and parts of a mural of St. Ursula.

=== Altarpiece by Cranach ===
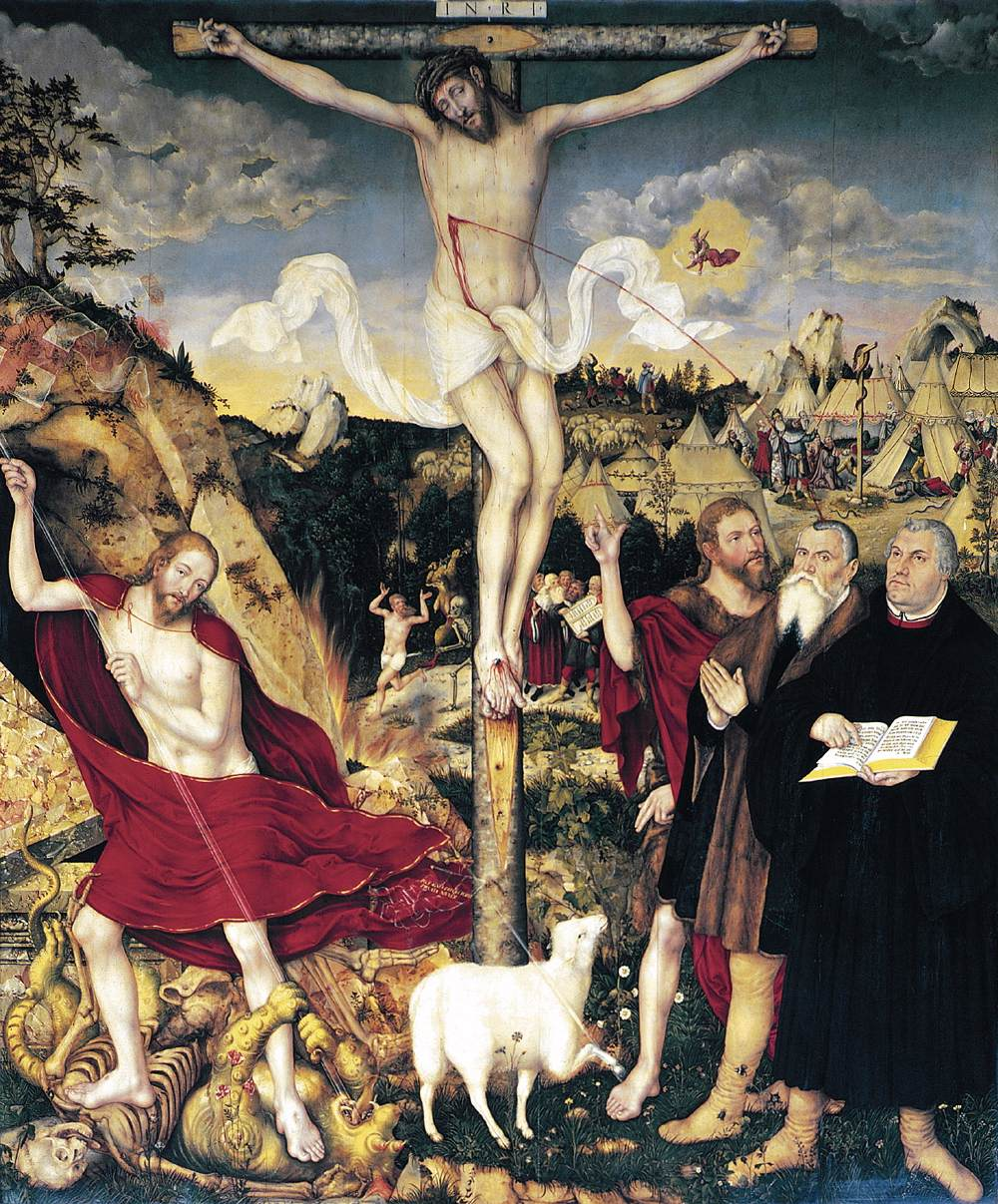
Christus am Kreuz by Cranach

The remarkable triptych image of the city was begun by Lucas Cranach the Elder in 1552/53, shortly before his death, and completed in 1555 by his son Lucas Cranach the Younger. It is regarded as a major work of art of the 16th century in Saxony and Thuringia.

=== Organ ===
Today's organ was built in 2000 by the organ builder Wilhelm Sauer (Frankfurt (Oder)) in the historic case of 1812. It is a reconstruction of the previous organ, which was built in 1907 by Eberhard Friedrich Walcker (Ludwigsburg). The instrument has 53 stops, it has slider chests and a mechanical key action, with electric stops and coupling.

The church is a concert venue of the festival Thüringer Bachwochen.
