= Schloss Belvedere, Weimar =

UNESCO World Heritage Site
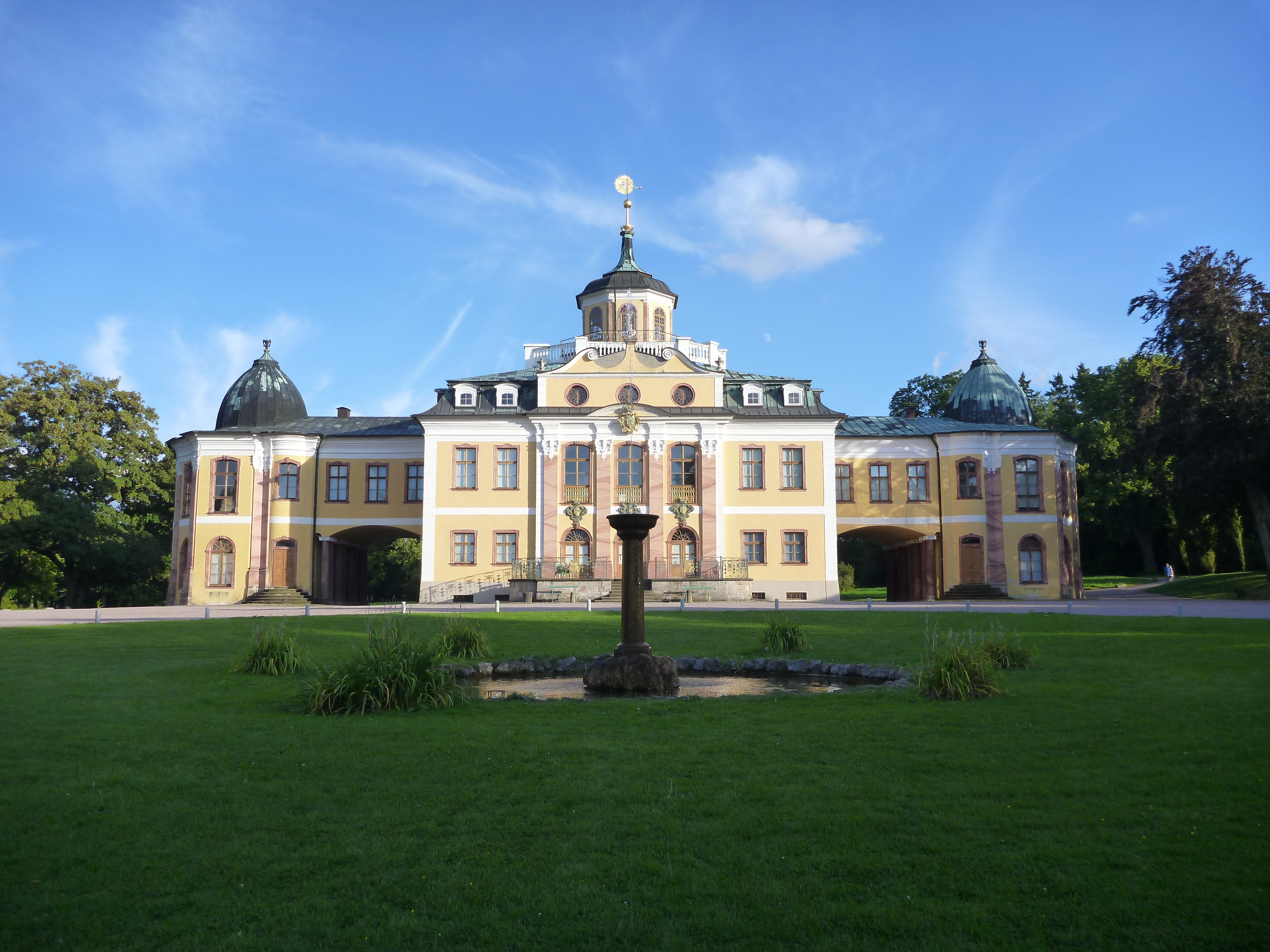
- Schloss Belvedere

- Location within Germany Location within Thuringia
- Location: Weimar, Germany
- Part of: Classical Weimar
- Criteria: Cultural: (iii), (vi)
- Reference: 846
- Inscription: 1998 (22nd Session)
- Coordinates: 50°56′54″N 11°20′57″E

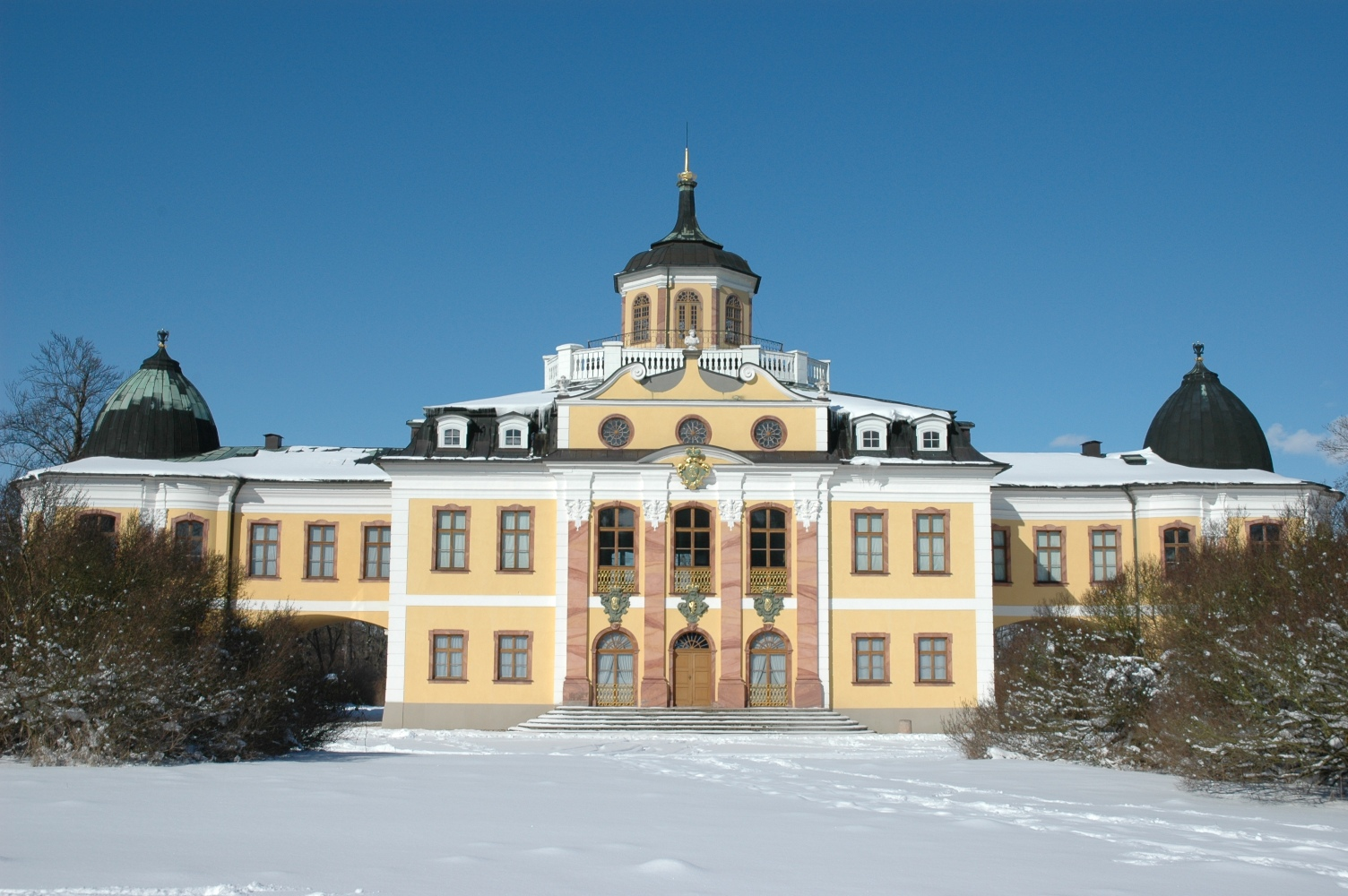
Belvedere seen from the garden in winter

The Baroque palace Schloss Belvedere on the outskirts of Weimar, is a pleasure-house (Lustschloss) built for house-parties, built in 1724–1732 to designs of Johann August Richter and Gottfried Heinrich Krohne for Ernst August, Duke of Saxe-Weimar. The corps de logis is flanked by symmetrical pavilions. Today it houses part of the art collections of Weimar, with porcelains and faience, furniture and paintings of the eighteenth century. As the summer residence, its gardens, laid out in the French style in 1728–1748, were an essential amenity. A wing of the Orangery in the Schlosspark contains a collection of historical carriages.

After 1811, much of the outer gardens was altered to conform to the English landscape garden style, as an Englischer Garten, for Grand Duke Carl Friedrich, who died at Belvedere in 1853. The enriched collection of exotic plants was published as Hortus Belvedereanus in 1820.

Because of its testimony to the cultural influence of Weimar during the height of Weimar Classicism in the late 18th and early 19th centuries, the Schloss Belvedere was inscribed on the UNESCO World Heritage List in 1998 as part of the Classical Weimar site.

== See also ==
- List of Baroque residences
