= Guthmannshausen =

- Ortsteil of Buttstädt
- Coat of arms
- Interactive map of Guthmannshausen
- Location within Germany Location within Thuringia
- Coordinates: 51°8′N 11°22′E
- Country: Germany
- State: Thuringia
- District: Sömmerda
- Municipality: Buttstädt

Area
  - Total: 10.12 km^{2} (3.91 sq mi)
- Elevation: 164 m (538 ft)

Population (2017-12-31)
  - Total: 712
  - Density: 70.4/km^{2} (182/sq mi)
- Time zone: UTC+01:00 (CET)
  - Summer (DST): UTC+02:00 (CEST)
- Postal codes: 99628
- Dialling codes: 036373

Guthmannshausen (German pronunciation: [ɡuːtmansˈhaʊzn̩]) is a village and a former municipality in the Sömmerda district of Thuringia, Germany. Since 1 January 2019, it is part of the municipality Buttstädt.
