= Heinrich Gräfe =

German educator (1802–1868)

Heinrich Gräfe or Graefe (3 March 1802 – 22 July 1868) was a German educator.

== Biography ==
Gräfe was born on 3 March 1802 at Buttstädt in Saxe-Weimar. He studied mathematics and theology at Jena, and in 1823 obtained a curacy in the town church of Weimar. He was transferred to Jena as rector of the town school in 1825; in 1840 he was also appointed extraordinary professor of the science of education (Pädagogik) in that university; and in 1842 he became head of the Burgersckule (middle class school) in Kassel.

After reorganizing the schools of the town, he became director of the new Realschule in 1843; and, devoting himself to the interests of educational reform in the Electorate of Hesse, he became in 1849 a member of the school commission, and also entered the house of representatives, where he made himself somewhat formidable as an agitator.

In 1852, for having been implicated in the September riots and in the movement against the unpopular minister Hassenpflug, who had dissolved the school commission, he was condemned to three years imprisonment, a sentence afterwards reduced to one of twelve months. On his release he withdrew to Geneva, where he engaged at the International Boarding School La Châtelaine (owner and director Achilles Roediger) until 1855, when he was appointed director of the Realschule in der Altstadt at Bremen until his death on 21 July 1868. His successor was Franz Georg Philipp Buchenau.

Besides being the author of many text-books and occasional papers on educational subjects, he wrote Des Rechisverhaltnis der Volksschule von innen und aussen (1829); Die Schulreform (1834); Schule fend Unterricht (1839); Allgemeine Pädagogik (1845); Die deutsche Volksschule (1847). Together with Naumann, he also edited the Archiv für das praktische Volksschulwesen (1828-1835).
