= Großbrembach =

- Ortsteil of Buttstädt
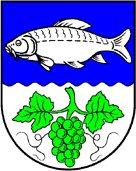
- Coat of arms
- Interactive map of Großbrembach
- Location within Germany Location within Thuringia
- Coordinates: 51°7′N 11°19′E
- Country: Germany
- State: Thuringia
- District: Sömmerda
- Municipality: Buttstädt

Area
  - Total: 16.28 km^{2} (6.29 sq mi)
- Elevation: 178 m (584 ft)

Population (2017-12-31)
  - Total: 694
  - Density: 42.6/km^{2} (110/sq mi)
- Time zone: UTC+01:00 (CET)
  - Summer (DST): UTC+02:00 (CEST)
- Postal codes: 99610
- Dialling codes: 036451

Großbrembach (German pronunciation: [ɡʁoːsˈbʁɛmbax], lit. 'Big Breːmbach', in contrast to "Little Brembach") is a village and a former municipality in the state of Thuringia, Germany. It is part of the district Sömmerda. Since 1 January 2019, it is part of the municipality Buttstädt.
