= Friedrich Wilhelm Riemer =

German writer (1774–1845)

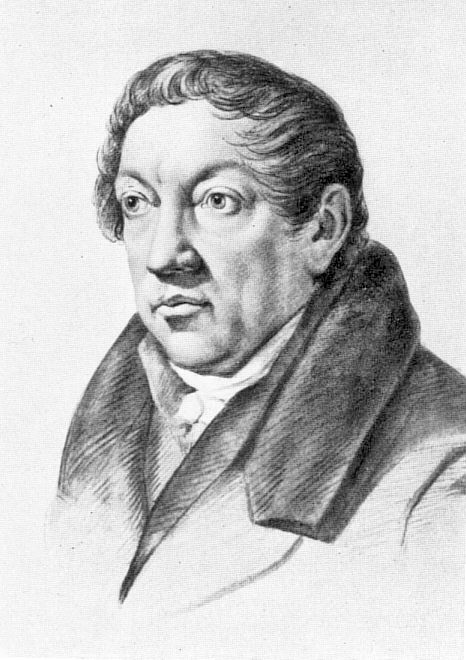
- Born: 19 April 1774
- Died: 19 December 1845 (aged 71)

Friedrich Wilhelm Riemer (19 April 1774 – 19 December 1845) was a German scholar and literary historian. He worked in the households of Wilhelm von Humboldt and Johann Wolfgang von Goethe.

== Biography ==
Riemer was born at Glatz. He studied theology and philology at Halle, was a tutor in the family of Wilhelm von Humboldt from 1801 to 1803, and then for nine years lived with Goethe as his literary assistant and his son's tutor. In 1812, he became professor at the Weimar gymnasium; from 1814 to 1820 he was assistant librarian, and from 1837 to his death he was librarian-in-chief at Weimar.

== Works ==
Riemer published some poetry, a Greek lexicon (1802–04), and Mitteilungen über Goethe (Notifications of Goethe, 1841). He edited the correspondence between Goethe and Carl Friedrich Zelter (Briefwechsel zwischen Goethe und Zelter, 1833–34), and his own correspondence with Goethe was published in two volumes, Briefe von und an Goethe (1846) and in Aus dem Goethehause (1892, edited by Franz Ferdinand Heitmüller).
