= Kleinbrembach =

- Ortsteil of Buttstädt
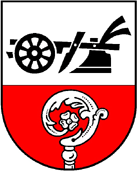
- Coat of arms
- Interactive map of Kleinbrembach
- Location within Germany Location within Thuringia
- Coordinates: 51°7′N 11°16′E
- Country: Germany
- State: Thuringia
- District: Sömmerda
- Municipality: Buttstädt

Area
  - Total: 8.15 km^{2} (3.15 sq mi)
- Elevation: 160 m (520 ft)

Population (2017-12-31)
  - Total: 304
  - Density: 37.3/km^{2} (96.6/sq mi)
- Time zone: UTC+01:00 (CET)
  - Summer (DST): UTC+02:00 (CEST)
- Postal codes: 99610
- Dialling codes: 036372

Kleinbrembach (German pronunciation: [klaɪnˈbʁɛmbax], lit. 'Little Brembach', in contrast to "Big Brembach") is a village and a former municipality in the Sömmerda district of Thuringia, Germany. Since 1 January 2019, it is part of the municipality Buttstädt.
