= Hardisleben =

- Ortsteil of Buttstädt
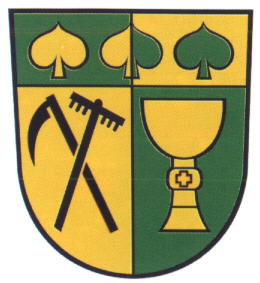
- Coat of arms
- Interactive map of Hardisleben
- Location within Germany Location within Thuringia
- Coordinates: 51°10′N 11°25′E
- Country: Germany
- State: Thuringia
- District: Sömmerda
- Municipality: Buttstädt

Area
  - Total: 9.43 km^{2} (3.64 sq mi)
- Elevation: 180 m (590 ft)

Population (2017-12-31)
  - Total: 551
  - Density: 58.4/km^{2} (151/sq mi)
- Time zone: UTC+01:00 (CET)
  - Summer (DST): UTC+02:00 (CEST)
- Postal codes: 99628
- Dialling codes: 036377

Hardisleben (German pronunciation: [ˈhaʁdɪsˌleːbn̩]) is a village and a former municipality in the Sömmerda district of Thuringia, Germany. Since 1 January 2019, it is part of the municipality Buttstädt.
