= Eßleben-Teutleben =

- Ortsteil of Buttstädt
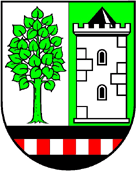
- Coat of arms
- Interactive map of Eßleben-Teutleben
- Location within Germany Location within Thuringia
- Coordinates: 51°8′39″N 11°27′22″E
- Country: Germany
- State: Thuringia
- District: Sömmerda
- Municipality: Buttstädt

Area
  - Total: 7.65 km^{2} (2.95 sq mi)
- Elevation: 210 m (690 ft)

Population (2017-12-31)
  - Total: 287
  - Density: 37.5/km^{2} (97.2/sq mi)
- Time zone: UTC+01:00 (CET)
  - Summer (DST): UTC+02:00 (CEST)
- Postal codes: 99628
- Dialling codes: 036373
- Vehicle registration: SÖM

Eßleben-Teutleben (German pronunciation: [ˈɛsˌleːbn̩ ˈtɔʏtˌleːbn̩]) is a village and a former municipality in the Sömmerda district of Thuringia, Germany. Since 1 January 2019, it is part of the municipality Buttstädt.
