= Olbersleben =

- Ortsteil of Buttstädt
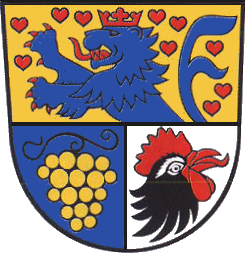
- Coat of arms
- Interactive map of Olbersleben
- Location within Germany Location within Thuringia
- Coordinates: 51°8′52″N 11°20′18″E
- Country: Germany
- State: Thuringia
- District: Sömmerda
- Municipality: Buttstädt

Area
  - Total: 13.16 km^{2} (5.08 sq mi)
- Elevation: 157 m (515 ft)

Population (2017-12-31)
  - Total: 711
  - Density: 54.0/km^{2} (140/sq mi)
- Time zone: UTC+01:00 (CET)
  - Summer (DST): UTC+02:00 (CEST)
- Postal codes: 99628
- Dialling codes: 036372
- Vehicle registration: SÖM

Olbersleben (German pronunciation: [ˈɔlbɐsˌleːbn̩]) is a village and a former municipality in the Sömmerda district of Thuringia, Germany. Since 1 January 2019, it is part of the municipality Buttstädt.

== History ==
It was first mentioned as Albrechsleybyn or Albrechtisleiben in 1264. The church called St. Wigbert was built up in 1500.
