= Buttstädt =

- Municipality
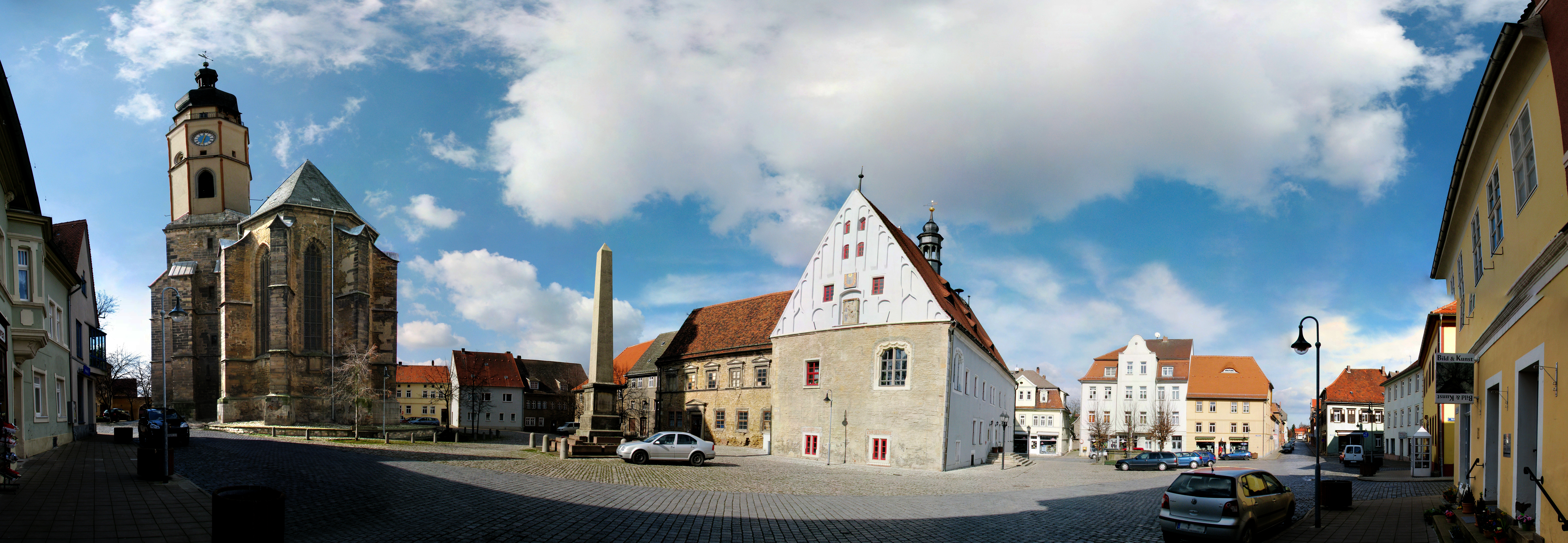
- Market place with St. Michael's church to the left

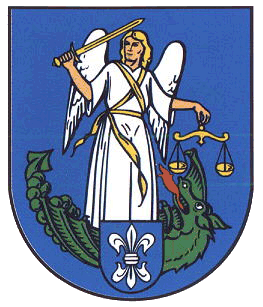
- Coat of arms

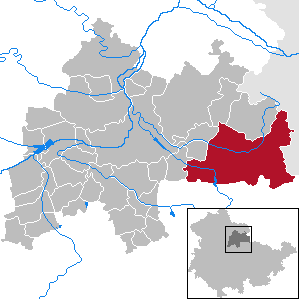
- Location of Buttstädt within Sömmerda district
- Interactive map of Buttstädt
- Location within Germany Location within Thuringia
- Coordinates: 51°7′N 11°25′E
- Country: Germany
- State: Thuringia
- District: Sömmerda

Government
  - Mayor (2019–25): Hendrik Blose (CDU)

Area
  - Total: 104.8 km^{2} (40.5 sq mi)
- Elevation: 201 m (659 ft)

Population (2025-12-31)
  - Total: 6,470
  - Density: 61.7/km^{2} (160/sq mi)
- Time zone: UTC+01:00 (CET)
  - Summer (DST): UTC+02:00 (CEST)
- Postal codes: 99628
- Dialling codes: 036373
- Vehicle registration: SÖM
- Website: stadt-buttstaedt.de

Buttstädt (German pronunciation: [ˈbʊtˌʃtɛt]) is a municipality in the district of Sömmerda, in Thuringia, Germany. It is situated 16 km northeast of Weimar. The former municipalities Ellersleben, Eßleben-Teutleben, Großbrembach, Guthmannshausen, Hardisleben, Kleinbrembach, Mannstedt, Olbersleben and Rudersdorf were merged into Buttstädt in January 2019.

== History ==
Within the German Empire (1871–1918), Buttstädt was part of the Grand Duchy of Saxe-Weimar-Eisenach.

== Personalities ==
=== Honorary citizen ===
- Ernst Behr (1847–1929), evangelical superintendent

=== Sons and daughters of the town ===
- Heinrich Gräfe (1802–1868), German educator
- Ortrun Wenkel (1942–2025), operatic contralto
- Henry Lauterbach (born 1957), athlete in long jump and high jump

=== People connected to Buttstädt ===
- Johann Samuel Schröter (1735–1808), theologian
- Johannes Enke (1899–1945), communist, resistance fighter against the Nazi regime, Nazi victim
