= Rudersdorf, Germany =

Rudersdorf
- Ortsteil of Buttstädt
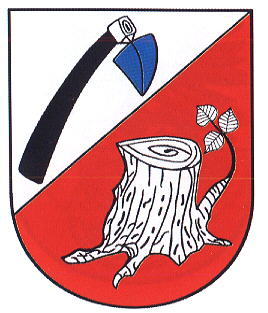
- Coat of arms
- Interactive map of Rudersdorf
- Location within Germany Location within Thuringia
- Coordinates: 51°6′N 11°27′E
- Country: Germany
- State: Thuringia
- District: Sömmerda
- Municipality: Buttstädt

Area
  - Total: 7.8 km^{2} (3.0 sq mi)
- Elevation: 200 m (660 ft)

Population (2017-12-31)
  - Total: 328
  - Density: 42/km^{2} (110/sq mi)
- Time zone: UTC+01:00 (CET)
  - Summer (DST): UTC+02:00 (CEST)
- Postal codes: 99628
- Dialling codes: 036373

Rudersdorf (German pronunciation: [ˈʁuːdɐsdɔʁf]) is a village and a former municipality in the Sömmerda district of Thuringia, Germany. Since 1 January 2019, it is part of the municipality Buttstädt.
