= Frédéric Soret =

Frédéric Soret (12 May 1795 in Saint Petersburg – 18 December 1865 at Plainpalais in Geneva) was a Swiss private scholar in physics and Oriental numismatics.

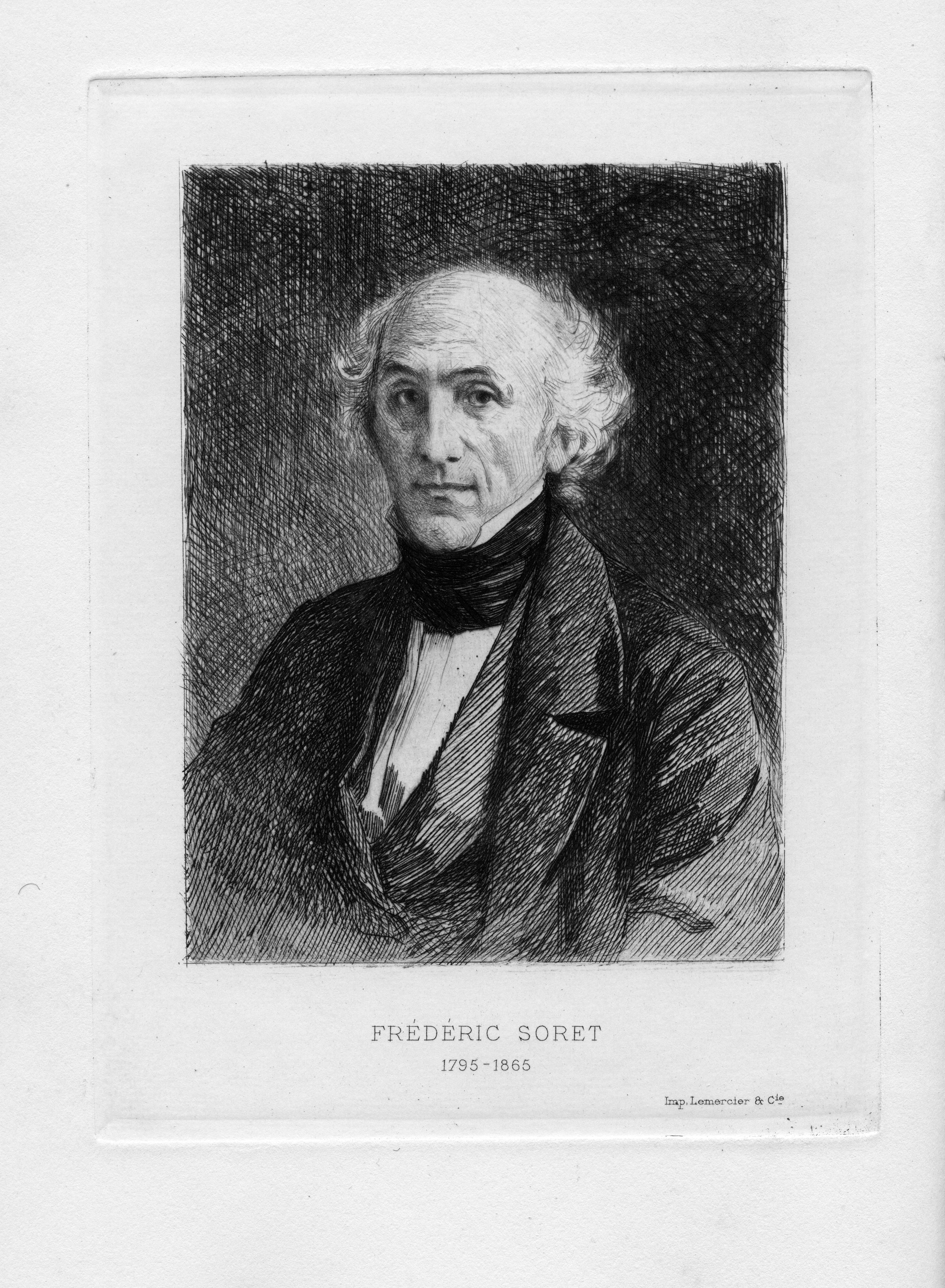
Frédéric Soret

== Biography ==
The Soret family originates from Geneva. Frédéric Soret was born in Saint Petersburg, where his father served as artist at the imperial court. In his youth the family returned to Geneva. There he studied physics. Between 1822 and 1836 Frédéric Soret served as princely tutor in the Grand Dukedome of Saxe-Weimar-Eisenach. He took care for the education of the later Grand Duke Carl Alexander, a son of the Maria Pavlovna and heir apparent. During his time in Weimar, he was a close acquaintance to Johann Wolfgang von Goethe. Soret translated several of Goethe's books about natural sciences into French.

After Soret's return to Geneva in 1836, he turned his attention to Islamic numismatics. The initial interest might have aroused by a coin hoard of the 9th century containing North-African dirhams of the caliphate. This hoard was found near the close by town of Steckborn in the Thurgau. He built up the greatest private collection of Oriental coins of his time, comprising about 5,000 coins. He became one of the most prolific and outstanding private scholars of Islamic numismatics. Due to his old ties to Saxe-Weimar and Eisenach he became a close friend to Johann Gustav Stickel, another founding father of Islamic numismatics. After the death of F. Soret 1865 Johann Gustav Stickel arranged the acquisition of the famous Soret collection by the Grand Ducal house. It entered then the Oriental Coin Cabinet Jena.

== References to his relation to Goethe and the court in Weimar ==
- Burkhardt, Carl August Hugo (ed.): Goethes Unterhaltungen mit Fr. Soret, Weimar 1905.
- Hazard, Paul (ed.): Frédéric Soret, Un Genevois a la cour de Weimar. Journal inédit de Frédéric Soret (1795–1865), Paris 1932.
- Houben, Hans Heinrich (tr. and ed.): Frédéric Soret, Zehn Jahre bei Goethe. Erinnerungen an Weimars klassische Zeit. Aus Sorets handschriftlichem Nachlaß, seinen Tage-büchern und seinem Briefwechsel, Leipzig 1929.
- Uhde, Hermann (ed.): Goethe's Briefe an Soret, Stuttgart 1877.
