= Goethe Federation =

German anti-censorship league

The General German Goethe Federation (Allgemeine Deutsche Goethe-Bund), or Goethe Federation for short, was a league created in March 1900 to counter the censorship attempts of the Lex Heinze by gathering all intellectual and artistic forces to protect the freedom of art and science. Its first central meeting took place in Weimar in November that year, with Charles Alexander, Grand Duke of Saxe-Weimar-Eisenach writing a petition to the Reichstag against theater censorship. In 1902, its Berlin branch founded the Volks-Schillerpreis.
