= Johann Gottfried Gruber =

German critic and literary historian (1774–1851)

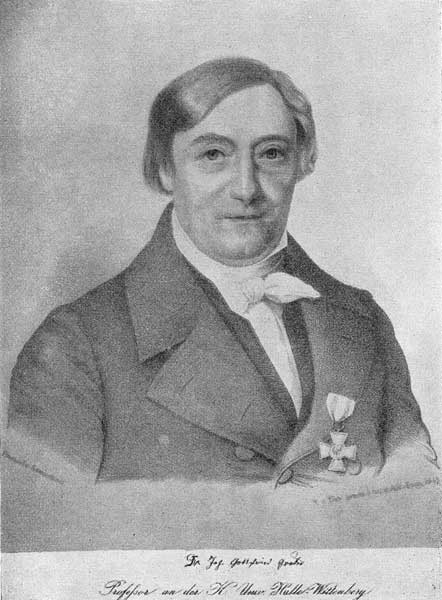
Johann Gottfried Gruber

Johann Gottfried Gruber (29 November 1774 – 7 August 1851) was a German critic and literary historian.

== Biography ==
Gruber was born at Naumburg on the Saale, in the Electorate of Saxony.

He received his education at the town school of Naumburg and the University of Leipzig, after which he resided successively at Göttingen, Leipzig, Jena and Weimar, occupying himself partly in teaching and partly in various literary enterprises, and enjoying in Weimar the friendship of Herder, Wieland and Goethe.

In 1811 he was appointed professor at the University of Wittenberg, and after the division of Saxony he was sent by the senate to Berlin to negotiate the union of the University of Wittenberg with that of Halle. After the union was effected he became in 1815 professor of philosophy at Halle. He was associated with Johann Samuel Ersch in the editorship of the great work Allgemeine Encyclopädie der Wissenschaften und Künste; and after the death of Ersch he continued the first section from vol. xviii. to vol. liv. He also succeeded Ersch in the editorship of the Allgemeine Literaturzeitung.

Gruber was the author of a large number of works, the principal of which are Charakteristik Herders (Leipzig, 1805), in conjunction with Johann T. L. Danz (1769–1851), afterwards professor of theology at Jena; Geschichte des menschlichen Geschlechts (2 volumes, Leipzig, 1806); Wörterbuch der altklassischen Mythologie (3 volumes, Weimar, 1810–1815); a life of Christoph Martin Wieland (Wielands Leben, 2 parts, Weimar, 1815–1816), and of Friedrich Gottlieb Klopstock (Klopstocks Leben, Weimar, 1832). He also edited Wieland's collected works (Wielands sämmtliche Werke, Leipzig, 1818–1828).
