= Charles Alexander, Grand Duke of Saxe-Weimar-Eisenach =

German grand duke (1818–1901)

Charles Alexander
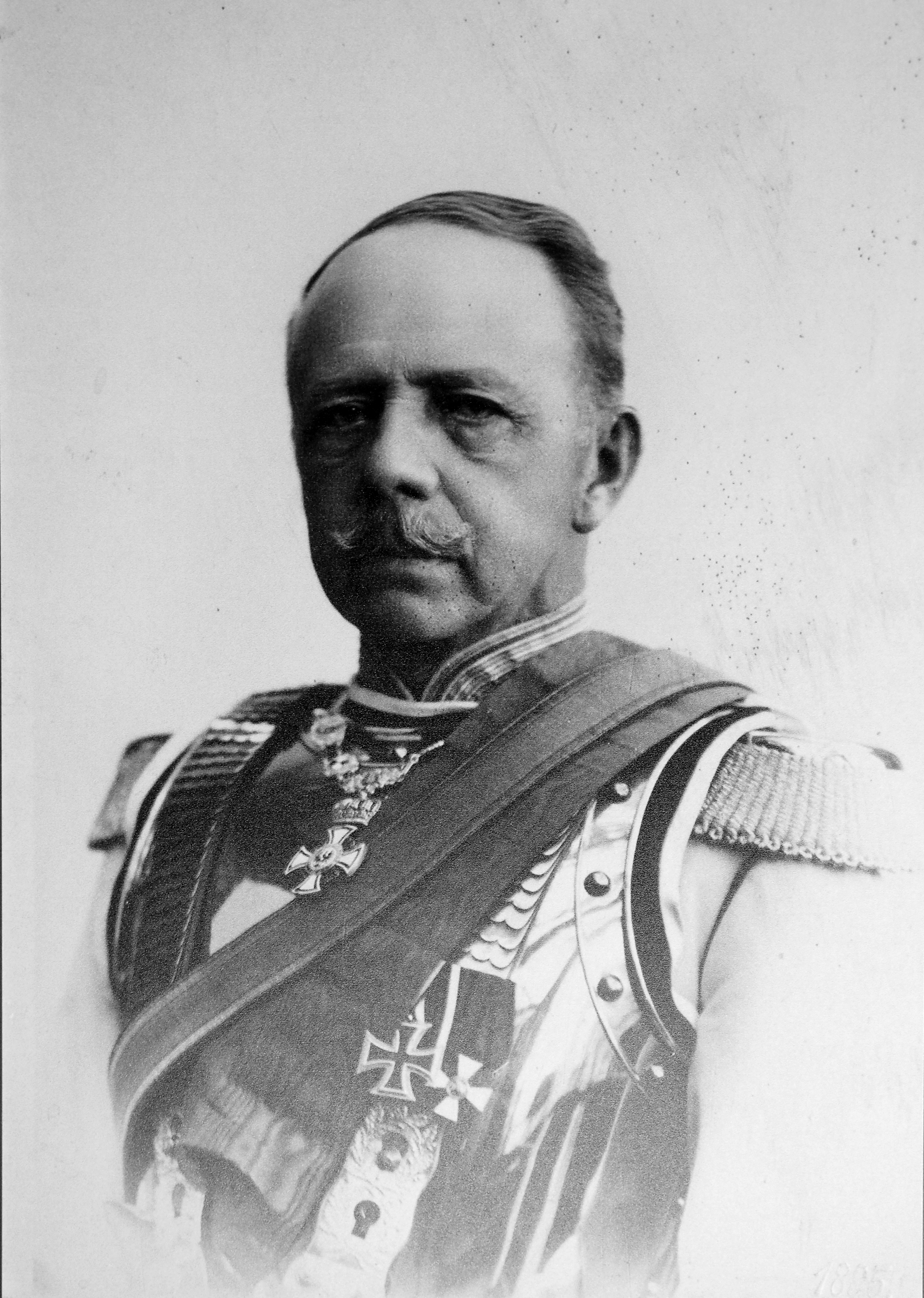
- Charles Alexander in 1885

Grand Duke of Saxe-Weimar-Eisenach
- Reign: 8 July 1853 – 5 January 1901
- Predecessor: Charles Frederick
- Successor: William Ernest
- Born: 24 June 1818; Weimar, Grand Duchy of Saxe-Weimar-Eisenach, German Confederation
- Died: 5 January 1901 (aged 82); Weimar, Grand Duchy of Saxe-Weimar-Eisenach, German Empire
- Burial: Weimarer Fürstengruft
- Spouse: Princess Sophie of the Netherlands (m. 1842; died 1897)
- Issue: Charles Augustus, Hereditary Grand Duke of Saxe-Weimar-Eisenach; Marie, Princess Heinrich VII Reuss; Princess Anna Sophia; Elisabeth, Duchess Johann Albrecht of Mecklenburg
Names
- Charles Alexander Augustus John; German: Karl Alexander August Johann Großherzog von Sachsen-Weimar-Eisenach
- House: Saxe-Weimar-Eisenach
- Father: Charles Frederick, Grand Duke of Saxe-Weimar-Eisenach
- Mother: Grand Duchess Maria Pavlovna of Russia
- Religion: Lutheranism

Charles Alexander (Karl Alexander August Johann; 24 June 1818 – 5 January 1901) was the ruler of Saxe-Weimar-Eisenach as its grand duke from 1853 until his death.

== Early life ==
Born in Weimar, Karl Alexander was the second but eldest surviving son of Karl Frederick, Grand Duke of Saxe-Weimar-Eisenach and Grand Duchess Maria Pavlovna of Russia. His mother engaged as tutor for Karl the Swiss scholar Frédéric Soret who became a close acquaintance to Johann Wolfgang von Goethe.

== Career ==
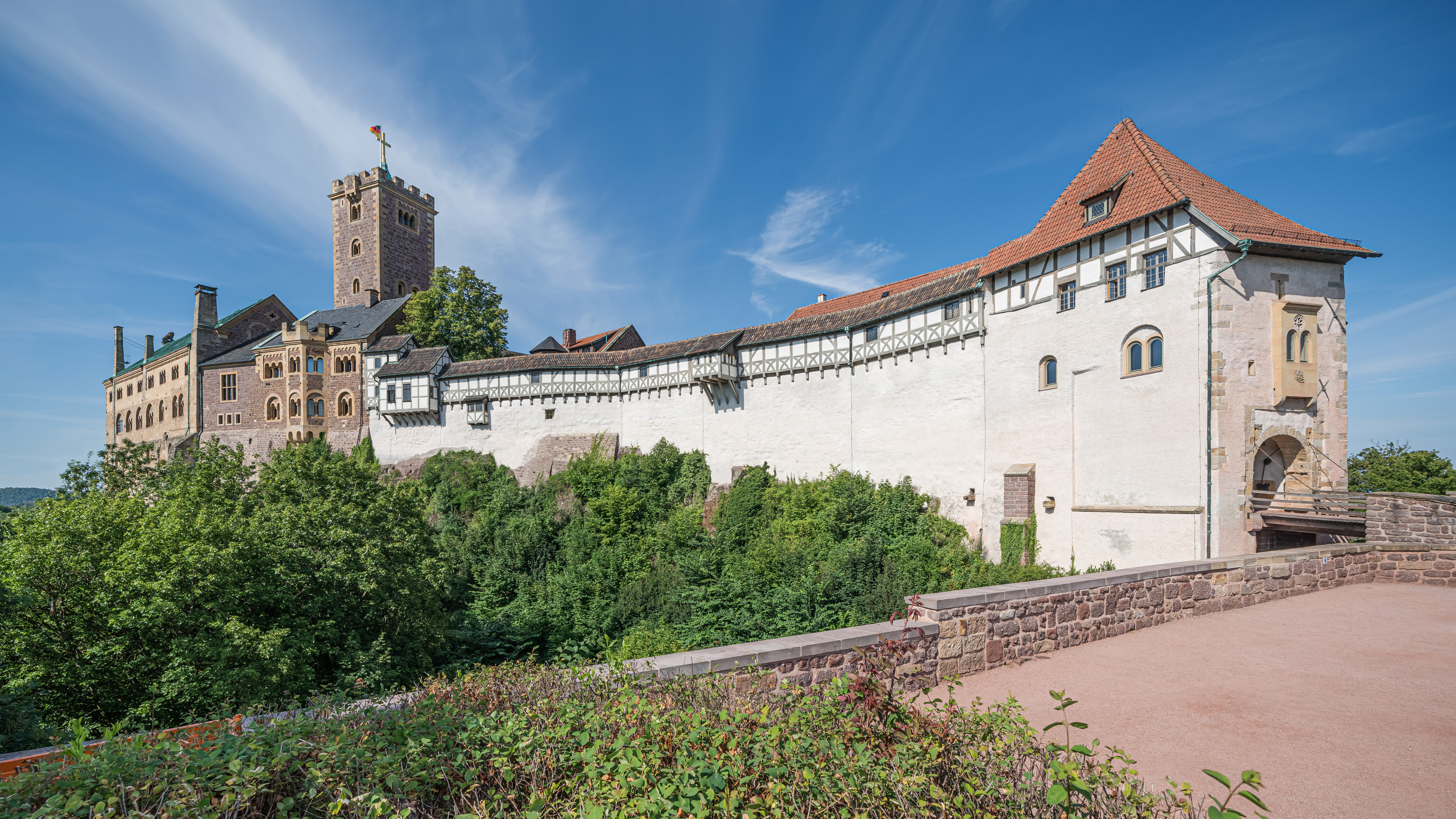
Wartburg Castle

On 8 July 1853 his father died, and Karl Alexander became Grand Duke; however, he postponed his constitutional accession until Goethe's birthday, on 28 August 1853.

Karl Alexander renovated Wartburg Castle and left his traces in many places in Eisenach. He was the protector of Richard Wagner and Franz Liszt, retained the tradition of Weimar's classical period, and gave the old part of Weimar a new and better appearance with the establishment of the Herder monument and the double monument for Goethe and Schiller. In 1860, he founded the Grand-Ducal Saxon Art School in Weimar (with Arnold Böcklin, Franz von Lenbach, and the plastic artist Reinhold Begas). As Grand Duke he was automatically rector, or president, of the University of Jena, where he supported especially the collections, among them prominently the Oriental Coin Cabinet.

In the Franco-Prussian War from 1870 to 1871, Karl Alexander participated only in "Samaritan"; he stressed, however, for his entrance into the war in favor of Schleswig in 1849. The Weimar Congress of the Goethe Federation (opposing the Lex Heinze) occurred towards the end of his reign, in November 1900. That congress described his government as the Silver Age of Weimar.

== Personal life ==
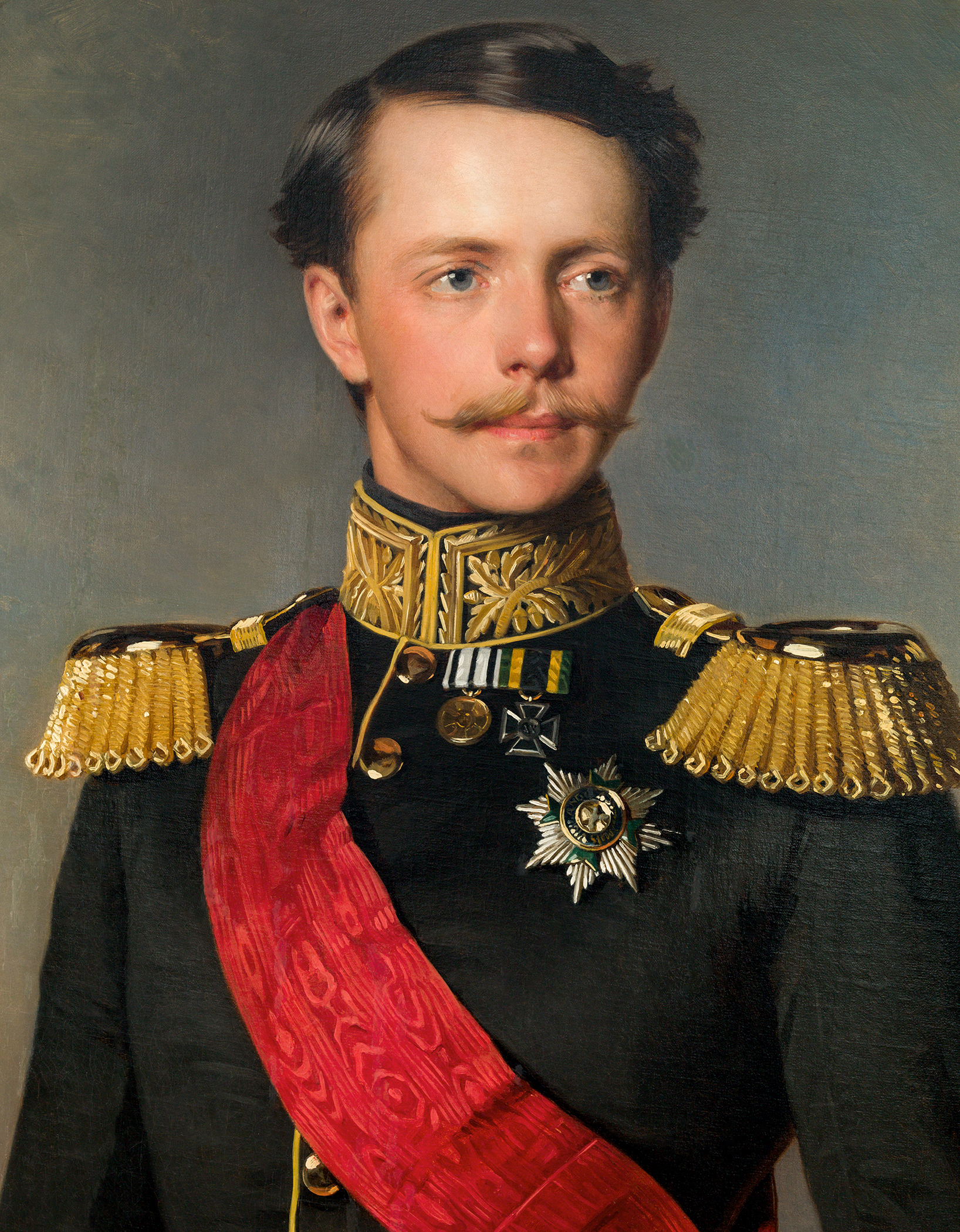
Portrait of Charles Alexander, by Richard Lauchert, 1855

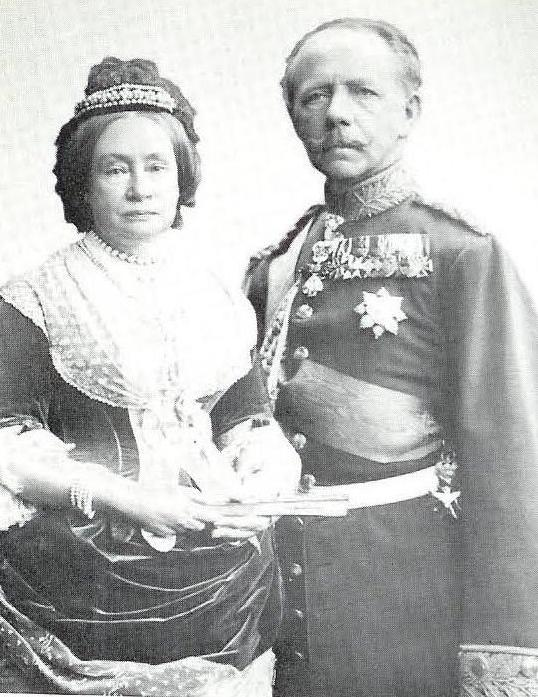
Charles Alexander with his wife Princess Sophie

On 8 October 1842 at Kneuterdijk Palace in The Hague, Karl Alexander married his first cousin, Princess Sophie of the Netherlands, daughter of William II and Grand Duchess Anna Pavlovna of Russia, sister of his mother. Together, they had four children:

1. Karl August Wilhelm Nicolaus Alexander Michael Bernhard Heinrich Frederick Stefan, Hereditary Grand Duke of Saxe-Weimar-Eisenach (1844–1894), who married his second cousin, Princess Pauline of Saxe-Weimar-Eisenach, in 1873.
2. Marie Anna Alexandrine Sophie Auguste Helene (1849–1922), known as Marie; she married Prince Heinrich VII Reuss of Köstritz in 1876.
3. Maria Anna Sophia Elisabeth Bernhardine Ida Auguste Helene (1851–1859), known as Anna; she died young.
4. Elisabeth Sibylle Maria Dorothea Anna Amalie Luise (1854–1908), known as Elisabeth; she married Duke Johann Albrecht of Mecklenburg-Schwerin in 1886.

In late December 1900, Karl Alexander reportedly fell ill with influenza. His condition soon worsened, becoming complicated with inflammation of the lungs and a slowing heart rate before the end of the month. He died at Weimar on 5 January 1901. Following his death, he was succeeded as Grand Duke by his grandson Wilhelm Ernst, his only son Carl August having predeceased him.

=== Relationship with Hans Christian Andersen ===
When he was the Hereditary Grand Duke, Karl Alexander established a strong friendship with Fanny Lewald and the Danish author and poet Hans Christian Andersen, but this close relationship stopped in 1849 for the war against Denmark over the duchies of Schleswig-Holstein (the First Schleswig War). Andersen was reportedly infatuated with Karl Alexander, writing

"I quite love the young duke, he is the first of all princes that I really find attractive".

Andersen and Karl Alexander maintained a relationship for many years and according to Andersen, the relationship was romantic in nature. In 1997, 173 letters between the two spanning 32 years, was published.

== Legacy ==
He was described in the memoirs of his distant relative, Prince Gabriel Constantinovich of Russia (1887-1955) as follows:

He had a small moustache, which he often dyed. When he kissed someone, his moustache left a mark on their cheek. Once, while travelling abroad when he was meeting my granny, Alexandra Iosifovna at the station, she got off the train with a dog in her arms. When he was going to kiss her, she placed the dog instead of her cheek and as a result he kissed the dog. Charles Alexander remembered Goethe on his deathbed. He spoke marvellous French of the early 19th century, just as our grandfathers spoke. I heard his mediation helped to reconcile Emperor Alexander II and Emperor Franz-Joseph whom Alexander II had refused to see because of Austria's role during the Sevastopol campaign.

== Honours and awards ==
He received the following awards:

German honours

- Saxe-Weimar-Eisenach: Grand Cross of the White Falcon, 7 July 1818; Grand Master, 8 July 1853
- (Saxe-Coburg and Gotha) (Duchy of Saxe-Altenburg) (Saxe-Meiningen) Ernestine duchies: Grand Cross of the Saxe-Ernestine House Order, February 1842
- Saxony: Knight of the Rue Crown, 1841
- Ascanian duchies: Grand Cross of Albert the Bear, 16 March 1852
- Baden:
  - Knight of the House Order of Fidelity, 1853
  - Grand Cross of the Zähringer Lion
- Bavaria: Knight of St. Hubert, 1864
- Brunswick: Grand Cross of Henry the Lion, 1859
- Hesse and by Rhine: Grand Cross of the Ludwig Order, 5 August 1840
- Hanover:
  - Grand Cross of the Royal Guelphic Order, 1849
  - Knight of St. George, 1857
- Mecklenburg: Grand Cross of the Wendish Crown, with Crown in Ore
- Nassau: Knight of the Gold Lion of Nassau, September 1858
- Oldenburg: Grand Cross of the Order of Duke Peter Friedrich Ludwig, with Golden Crown, 25 April 1844
- Prussia:
  - Knight of the Black Eagle, with Collar, 14 June 1838; with Collar, 1856
  - Grand Commander's Cross of the Royal House Order of Hohenzollern, 9 November 1861
  - Grand Cross of the Red Eagle
  - Iron cross 2nd class 1870
  - War Commemorative Medal of 1870/71
- Schaumburg-Lippe: Military Merit Medal, with Swords
- Württemberg: Grand Cross of the Württemberg Crown, 1851

Foreign honours

- Austrian Empire: Grand Cross of St. Stephen, 1843
- Belgium: Grand Cordon of the Order of Leopold, 26 July 1853
- Empire of Brazil: Grand Cross of the Southern Cross
- Denmark: Knight of the Elephant, 1 July 1878
- French Empire: Grand Cross of the Legion of Honour, 10 October 1860
- Kingdom of Italy: Knight of the Annunciation, with Collar, 22 October 1885
- Empire of Japan: Grand Cordon of the Order of the Chrysanthemum, 9 March 1882
- Netherlands:
  - Grand Cross of the Netherlands Lion
  - Grand Cross of the Military William Order
- Kingdom of Portugal: Grand Cross of the Tower and Sword, 1854
- Russian Empire:
  - Knight of St. Andrew, with Collar
  - Knight of St. Alexander Nevsky
  - Knight of the White Eagle
  - Knight of St. Anna, 1st Class
  - Knight of St. George, 4th Class(29 augustus 1870 )
- Spain:
  - Grand Cross of the Order of Charles III, 10 December 1861
  - Knight of the Golden Fleece, with Collar, 1 June 1875
- Sweden-Norway:
  - Knight of the Seraphim, 9 June 1875
  - Grand Cross of St. Olav, 23 July 1882
- Grand Duchy of Tuscany: Grand Cross of St. Joseph

== Ancestry ==
Ancestors of Charles Alexander, Grand Duke of Saxe-Weimar-Eisenach

8. Ernest Augustus II, Duke of Saxe-Weimar-Eisenach
4. Charles Augustus, Grand Duke of Saxe-Weimar-Eisenach
9. Duchess Anna Amalia of Brunswick-Wolfenbüttel
2. Charles Frederick, Grand Duke of Saxe-Weimar-Eisenach
10. Louis IX, Landgrave of Hesse-Darmstadt
5. Princess Louise of Hesse-Darmstadt
11. Countess Palatine Caroline of Zweibrücken
1. Charles Alexander, Grand Duke of Saxe-Weimar-Eisenach
12. Peter III of Russia
6. Paul I of Russia
13. Catherine II of Russia
3. Grand Duchess Maria Pavlovna of Russia
14. Frederick II Eugene, Duke of Württemberg
7. Duchess Sophie Dorothea of Württemburg
15. Princess Friederike of Brandenburg-Schwedt

German royalty
| Preceded by Karl Frederick | Grand Duke of Saxe-Weimar-Eisenach; 1853–1901 | Succeeded by Wilhelm Ernst |
