= Volks-Schillerpreis =

German literary award

Volks-Schillerpreis was a literary prize of Germany awarded by Goethe Federation to:

- 1905 Carl Hauptmann, Gerhart Hauptmann and Richard Beer-Hofmann
- 1908 Ernst Hardt
- 1913 Herbert Eulenberg.
