= Johann Gustav Stickel =

German theologian, orientalist and numismatist

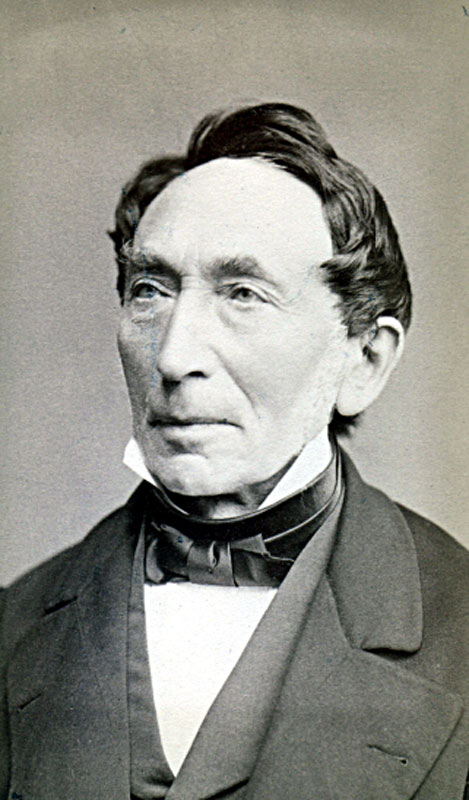
Johann Gustav Stickel

Johann Gustav Stickel (7 July 1805 – 21 January 1896) was a German theologian, orientalist and numismatist at Jena University.

== Biography ==
Stickel was born in Eisenach in 1805. He went to school in Buttelstedt and in Weimar. In his youth he demonstrated a gift for the Hebrew language. From 1822 Johann Gustav Stickel studied rationalist Protestant theology of enlightenment which included at that time Oriental languages like Syriac and Arabic at Jena University. His teachers were Andreas Gottlieb Hoffmann (1796–1864), who is known for his Hebrew and Syriac studies, and Johann Traugott Leberecht Danz (1769–1851). In 1826, Stickel's first publication earned him a fame as someone who did exegesis with "precise grammatical-historical interpretation of the Hebrew text". He was much influenced by Johann Gottfried Herder. From 1827 to 1896, Stickel taught in Jena. In 1827 he presented his habilitation on the prophet Habakuk to the minister of state in Weimar responsible for the University, at that time Johann Wolfgang von Goethe. Weimar was the capital of the Grand Duchy of Saxe-Weimar-Eisenach.

In the winter term 1828–29, Stickel had the opportunity to continue his studies at the school for Oriental studies in Paris, the École speciale des langues orientales, with the financial support of the ducal house and Goethe's recommendation. Stickel's most influential teacher in Paris was Antoine Isaac Silvestre de Sacy, but he also studied Sanskrit with Antoine Leonard de Chézy (1773–1832) and Chinese with Jean-Pierre Abel-Rémusat (1788–1832). Between 1827 and 1832, Stickel remained a frequent visitor in the house of Johann Wolfgang von Goethe in Weimar.

In 1830 he became adjunct professor (außerordentlicher Professor) at the Faculty of Theology. This, however, was a position with an uncertain future. Upon his return from Paris, he tried to build up a reputation for himself as philological Orientalist. Most notable was his Sentences of the Caliph 'Ali ibn Abi Talib, based on a manuscript in Weimar and published in 1834. In 1836 he was promoted to be regular honorary professor (ordentlicher Honorarprofessor) at the Faculty of Theology. However this position was still without expectancy of a secure position and first of all not the call to Oriental studies, which he had hoped for.

After getting a call for a chair in Göttingen for Oriental studies in 1838, he achieved a better outlook for his career in Weimar. This call, however, was only possible because his colleague Heinrich Ewald was relegated as one of the "Göttingen Seven". He had protested against the open breach of the constitution by the King of Hanover. Compared with Hanover, the Grand Duchy allowed a far more liberal political atmosphere for the academia. Stickel hesitated on moral political reasons to follow this call.

Meanwhile, in 1839, the Ministry of State responsible for the University decided to establish again Oriental studies within the Faculty of Philosophy, with two professorships. In 1839 Stickel transferred to the Faculty of Philosophy as regular honorary professor (ordentlicher Honorarprofessor), which allowed him to pursue his studies in Oriental philology, especially for the Semitic languages. Hermann Brockhaus took over the second professorship for Oriental languages. Beside the Old Testament he taught Indo-Germanic languages, Sanskrit and Persian. In 1840 Stickel succeeded in founding the Grand Ducal Oriental Coin Cabinet in Jena with the financial aid of the Grand Duke Carl Friedrich of Saxe-Weimar-Eisenach. Later the Grand Duchess Maria Pavlovna became the main benefactor of the collection. She gave the money for the acquisition of several outstanding collections. In the 19th century, the Grand Ducal Oriental Coin Cabinet became one of the leading institutions in the field of oriental numismatics.

In 1843 Stickel was appointed officially as director of the Oriental Coin Cabinet, a position which he held jointly with his professorship. In 1848 he finally got a full professorship at the Faculty of Philosophy.

Stickel is still known for his pioneering studies on Islamic numismatics, while he is almost forgotten for his contributions on Semitic philology and theology. During the nineteenth century his study on the prophet Job (1842) had much influence, while his study on Etruscan language (1858) was received with criticism. His works on numismatics were reprinted several times until today.

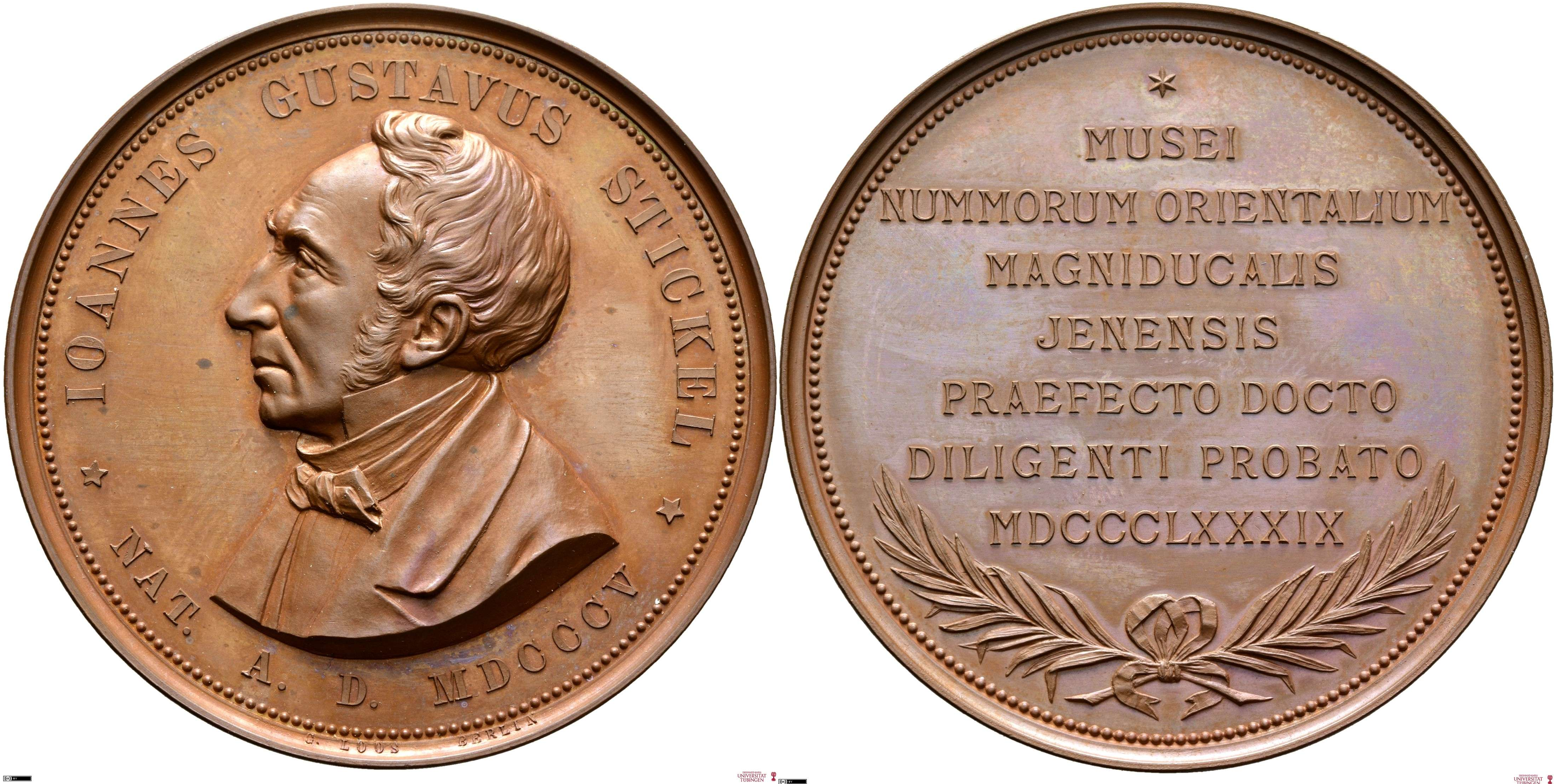
Medal Johann Gustav Stickel 1889

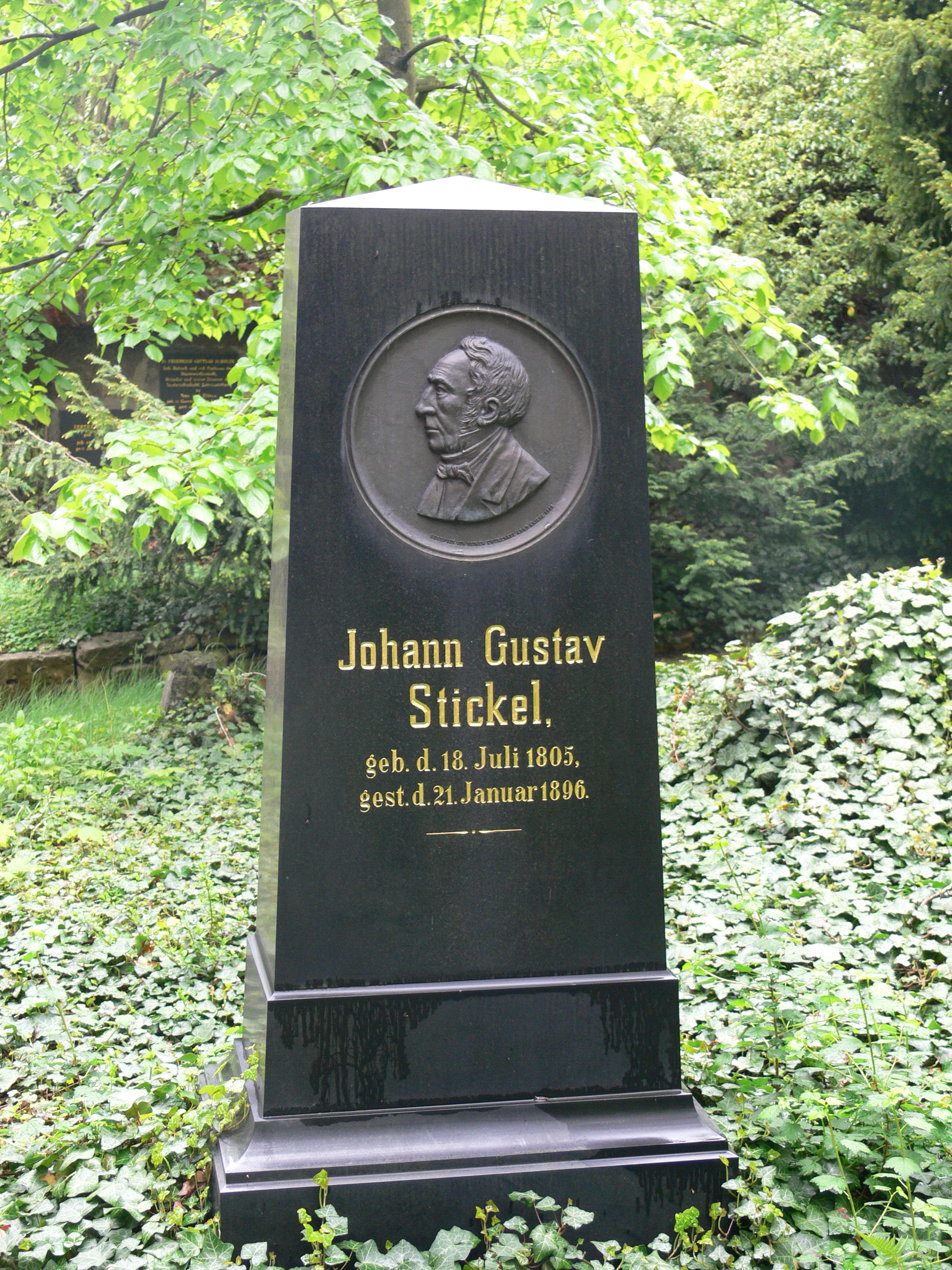
Obelisk for JGS (restored in 1998).

In 1889 he received a medal honouring his work as a scientist and as curator of the Grand Ducal Oriental Coin Cabinet. The medal was commissioned by the Grand Duke Charles Alexander of Saxe-Weimar-Einsenach. The black obelisk memorial stone on his grave, prominent on the cemetery of St. John in the west of the city of Jena, is adorned with a bronze plaque bearing his image.

== Selected works ==
1826 with Karl Friedrich Bogenhard, Biga Commentationum de morali primaevorum Christianorum conditione secundum sacros Novi Testamenti libros exhiberunt Joanes Gustavus Stickel, Carolus Fridericus Bogenhard. Edidit et praefatus est D. Joannes Fridericus Roehr, Neustadt an der Orla.

1827 Prolusio ad interpretationem tertii capitiis Habacuci, Part. I. Jena. [Habilitation].

1832 In Jobi locum celeberrimum Cap. XIX, 25-27 de Goele Commentatio philologica-historico critica (...) pro summis in theologia honoribus rite adipiscendis publice defendet, Jena 1832. [Dedicated to A. I. Silvestre de Sacy]

1834 Sententiae Ali ben Abi Taleb, arabice et persice e cod. mspt. Vimariensi primus edidit atque in usum scholarum anotatt. maximam partem grammaticis nec non Glossariis instruxit, Jena.

1842 Das Buch Hiob rhythmisch gegliedert und übersetzt mit exegetischen und kritischen Bemerkungen, Leipzig (Weidmann'sche Buchhandlung) 1842.

1845 Handbuch zur Morgenländischen Münzkunde. Das grossherzogliche orientalische Münzcabinet zu Jena, erstes Heft, Omajjaden- und Abbasiden-münzen, Leipzig (F. A. Brockhaus).

1858 Das Etruskische durch Erklärung von Inschriften und Namen als Semitische Sprache erwiesen, Leipzig (Wilhelm Engelmann).

1866 Neuentdeckte kufische Bleisiegel und Verwandtes, in: Zeitschrift der Deutschen Morgenländischen Gesellschaft 20, pp. 1–42.

1870 Handbuch zur Orientalischen Münzkunde. Das Grossherzogliche orientalische Münzcabinet zu Jena. Zweites Heft, Älteste Muhammedanische Münzen bis zur Münzreform des Abdulmelik's, Leipzig (F.A. Brockhaus).

1886 Meine Berührungen mit Goethe, in: Goethe-Jahrbuch 7, pp. 231–240.

1975 Handbuch zur Morgenländischen Münzkunde, erstes und zweites Heft [Reprint of the editions of 1845 and 1870 in one volume], Leipzig (Zentralantiquariat der Deutschen Demokratischen Republik).

2005 Das Etruskische durch Erklärung von Inschriften und Namen als Semitische Sprache erwiesen [reprint of the 1858 edition], (Elibron Classics Series)(ISBN 1-4212-3500-5).

Several articles and studies were reprinted in 2003 and 2004 in the series "Islamic Numismatics" by the Institute for the History of Arabic-Islamic Sciences, Frankfurt. The above-mentioned works of 1827, 1842, 1858, 1866, 1886 can be found as full versions in https://books.google.com.
