= Maria Pavlovna, Grand Duchess of Saxe-Weimar-Eisenach =

Grand Duchess of Saxe-Weimar-Eisenach

Maria Pavlovna of Russia
- Grand Duchess of Saxe-Weimar-Eisenach
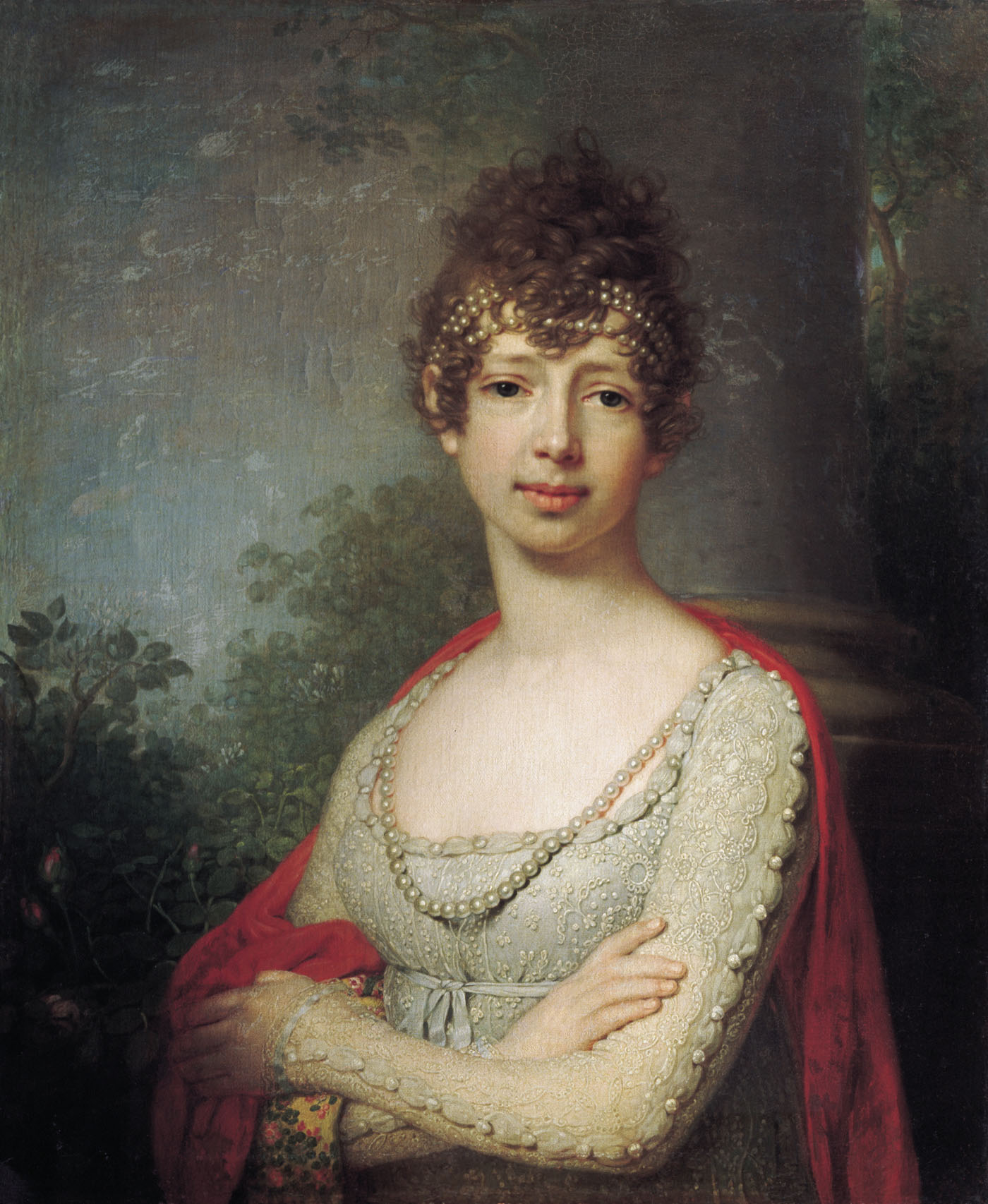
- Portrait by Vladimir Borovikovsky, 1804

Grand Duchess consort of Saxe-Weimar-Eisenach
- Tenure: 14 June 1828 – 8 July 1853
- Born: Maria Pavlovna Romanova; 16 February 1786; Saint Petersburg, Empire of Russia
- Died: 23 June 1859 (aged 73); Belvedere Palace, Weimar, Grand Duchy of Saxe-Weimar-Eisenach, Imperial Confederate of Germany
- Spouse: Charles Frederick, Grand Duke of Saxe-Weimar-Eisenach (m. 1804; died 1853)
- Issue: Prince Charles; Marie, Princess Charles of Prussia; Augusta, German Empress; Charles Alexander, Grand Duke of Saxe-Weimar-Eisenach
- House: Holstein-Gottorp-Romanov
- Father: Paul I of Russia
- Mother: Sophie Dorothea of Württemberg

Maria Pavlovna (Russian: Мария Павловна; 16 February [O.S. 5 February] 1786 – 23 June [O.S. 11 June] 1859) was a grand duchess of Russia as the daughter of Paul I, Emperor of all the Russias and Empress Maria Feodorovna and later became the Grand Duchess of Saxe-Weimar-Eisenach by her marriage to Charles Frederick of Saxe-Weimar-Eisenach (1783–1853).

== Early life ==
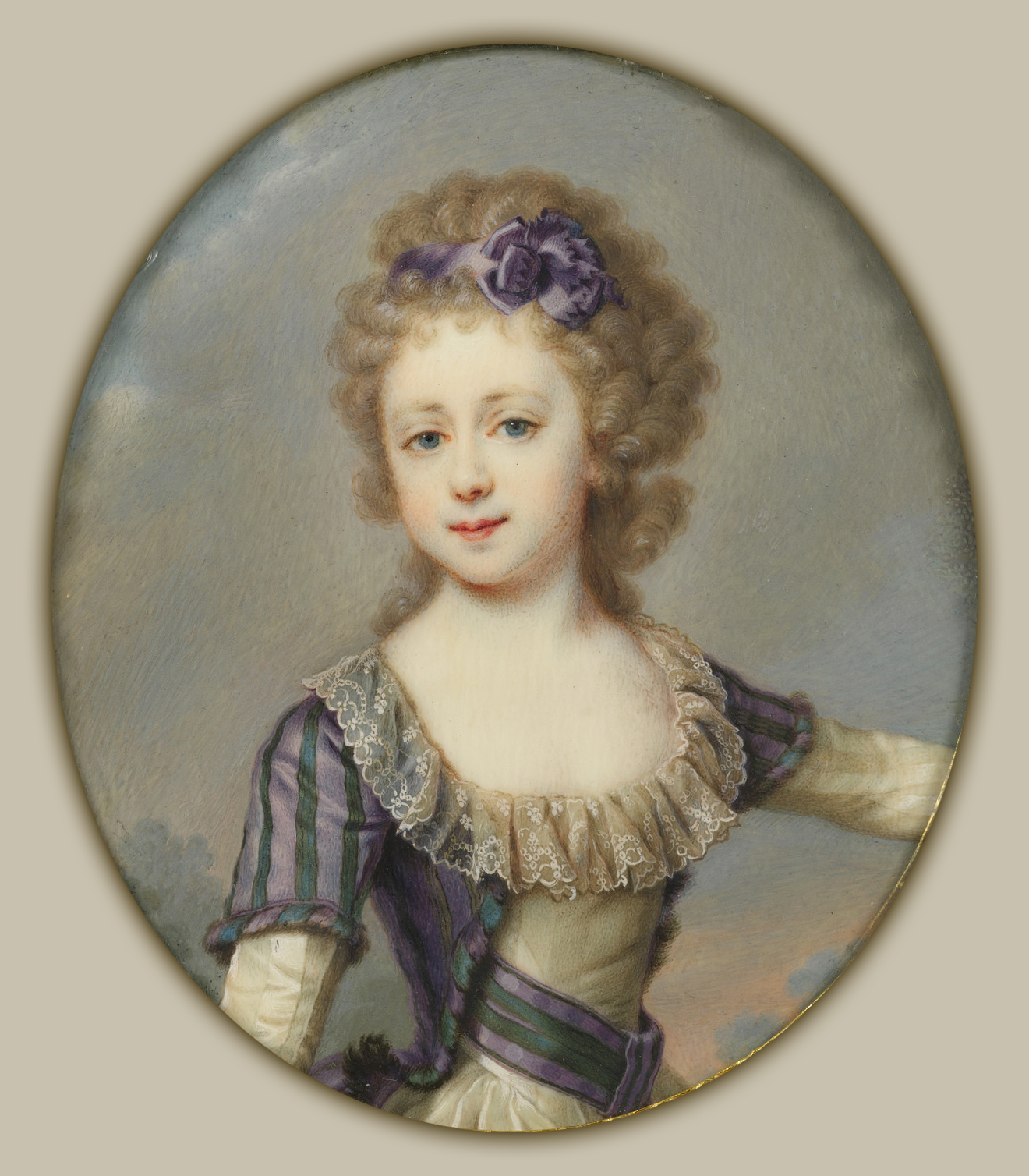
Portrait of Maria Pavlovna as a child, c. 1796

Grand Duchess Maria Pavlovna Romanova of Russia was born on 16 February 1786 in Saint Petersburg as the fifth child and third daughter of Tsesarevich Paul Petrovich of Russia and his second wife, Tsesarevna Maria Feodorovna (1754–1801), born Duchess Sophie Dorothea of Württemberg (1759–1828). She was named after her mother.

Maria Pavlovna spent her childhood in the Pavlovsk Palace and the Great Gatchina Palace. As a child, she was not considered pretty as her face had been disfigured as a result of being variolated. She was a talented pianist, for which her paternal grandmother, Catherine the Great (1729–1796) admired her, even though she thought that Maria Pavlovna would have been better off had she been born a boy. Her music instructor was Giuseppe Sarti, an Italian composer and the kapellmeister of the Russian court. From 1798, she was taught music by Ludwig-Wilhelm Tepper de Ferguson.

== Life in Weimar ==
On 3 August 1804, Maria Pavlovna married Charles Frederick, Hereditary Grand Duke of Saxe-Weimar-Eisenach (1783–1853). The couple stayed in Saint Petersburg for nine months before departing for Weimar. There, Maria Pavlovna was greeted with festivities as described by Christoph Martin Wieland: "The most festive part of all the magnificence of balls, fireworks, promenades, comedies, illuminations was the widespread and genuine joy at the arrival of our new princess".

As grand duchess, she took care of the poor of the country. She last visited Russia at the occasion of the coronation of her nephew, Alexander II of Russia in 1855.

=== Patronage of arts and sciences ===
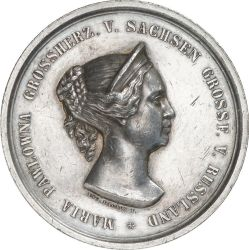
Maria Pavlovna on a medal by Angela Facius from 1854, made for the golden jubilee of her arrival in Weimar.

Maria Pavlovna was interested in both art and science. She maintained a lifelong correspondence with Vasily Zhukovsky, and Friedrich Schiller dedicated one of his last poems to her. Schiller praised her "talents in music and painting and genuine love of reading", while Johann Wolfgang von Goethe hailed her as one of the worthiest women of his time.

According to Mary Leveson-Gower, the duchess by the 1820s had grown "very deaf, but had delightful manners".

Most famously, she held "literary evenings" ("Literarische Abende") where scholars both from and outside of the neighbouring University of Jena were invited to give lectures on various topics. The grand duchess herself attended ten courses at the university, some delivered by Alexander von Humboldt (1769–1859). Several collections of the institution benefitted of her patronage, among them the Grandducal Oriental Coin Cabinet founded in 1840 by the orientalist Johann Gustav Stickel (1805–1896). She also played an instrumental role in establishing the Falk Institute in Weimar.

In her later years, Maria Pavlovna invited Franz Liszt to her court and appointed him "Kapellmeister extraordinaire" in 1842. In 1850, Richard Wagner's opera Lohengrin premiered in Weimar, but her growing deafness prevented the grand duchess from enjoying it.

== Issue ==
Maria Pavlovna had four children by her husband, Charles Frederick of Saxe-Weimar-Eisenach (1783–1853), three of whom survived to adulthood:

- Paul Alexander Karl Constantin Frederick August of Saxe-Weimar-Eisenach (25 September 1805 – 10 April 1806), died in infancy
- Marie Louise Alexandrina of Saxe-Weimar-Eisenach (3 February 1808 – 18 January 1877), who married Prince Charles of Prussia (1801 –1883) and had issue.
- Marie Louise Augusta Catherine of Saxe-Weimar-Eisenach (30 September 1811 – 7 January 1890), who became German Empress after marrying William I, German Emperor (1797–1888) and had issue.
- Charles Alexander Augustus John, Grand Duke of Saxe-Weimar-Eisenach (24 June 1818 – 5 January 1901), who inherited his father's throne, married Princess Sophie of the Netherlands (1824–1897) and had issue.

== Letters ==
Maria Pavlovna's letters to her maternal grandfather, Frederick II Eugene, Duke of Württemberg written between 1795 and 1797 are preserved in the State Archive of Stuttgart. Her letters from between 1800 and 1859 are preserved in the "Maria Paulowna letters" collection of the Hoover Institution Library and Archives of Stanford University.

== Ancestry ==
Ancestors of Maria Pavlovna, Grand Duchess of Saxe-Weimar-Eisenach

8. Charles Frederick, Duke of Holstein-Gottorp
4. Peter III of Russia
9. Grand Duchess Anna Petrovna of Russia
2. Paul I of Russia
10. Christian August, Prince of Anhalt-Zerbst
5. Catherine II of Russia
11. Princess Johanna Elisabeth of Holstein-Gottorp
1. Grand Duchess Maria Pavlovna of Russia
12. Charles Alexander, Duke of Württemberg
6. Frederick II Eugene, Duke of Württemberg
13. Princess Marie Auguste of Thurn and Taxis
3. Duchess Sophie Dorothea of Württemberg
14. Frederick William, Margrave of Brandenburg-Schwedt
7. Princess Friederike of Brandenburg-Schwedt
15. Princess Sophia Dorothea of Prussia

Maria Pavlovna, Grand Duchess of Saxe-Weimar-Eisenach House of Holstein-Gottorp-Romanov Cadet branch of the House of Oldenburg Born: 16 February 1786 Died: 23 June 1859
German royalty
Preceded by Louise of Hesse-Darmstadt	Grand Duchess consort of Saxe-Weimar; 14 June 1828 – 8 July 1853	Succeeded by Sophie of the Netherlands
