= Lex Heinze =

Proposed German draft law

German Empire
- Long title: Amendment to the Reich Criminal Code concerning immorality and pimping
- Passed: 6 February 1900
- Enacted: 22 May 1900
- Status: Repealed

The Lex Heinze (Latin: Heinze Law) was a controversial law of 1900 amending Germany's Reich Criminal Code to outlaw the public depiction of "immoral" acts in works of art, literature and theater performances and introduce the criminal offense of pimping. After numerous public protests and resistance by several circles within the liberal bourgeoisie and the Social Democrats, the Reichstag passed a looser version of the draft law and added the "morality paragraphs" of the Reich Criminal Code in a compromise version.

The law was named after the Berlin pimp Hermann Heinze, who was convicted of “causing bodily harm resulting in death” in 1887. His name became a synonym for "immorality" in the broadest sense.

== History ==
The draft law was initiated by Wilhelm II and was first introduced in 1892. On 6 February 1900, at the end of the second reading, the Lex Heinze was adopted. The "art and shop window paragraph" was intended to prevent the distribution of pictures and writings "... which, without being lewd, grossly offend the sense of modesty...". The "employer clause” threatened employers who “determine their workers to have tolerated or committed lewd acts" with punishment. In addition, there was a "theatrical paragraph" that provided for prison for anyone "... who organizes or directs public theatrical performances, musical comedies, singing or declamatory lectures, exhibitions of people or similar performances, which cause a nuisance through gross violation of the sense of modesty and morality".

The art and theater paragraphs in particular triggered strong public protests. The opponents criticized the potentially arbitrary scope of a prohibition of immoral works and pointed out that it barred the public performance or display of numerous valuable and generally recognized works of art from antiquity to modern times. On 15 March 1900, around 150 artists, politicians and scholars founded the Goethe Association under the leadership of the prominent writer Hermann Sudermann to safeguard artistic and scientific freedom. In addition to him, the Munich theater entrepreneur Otto Falckenberg appeared with a pamphlet against the proposed law: The book of Lex Heinze, a cultural document from the beginning of the twentieth century (Staackmann, Leipzig 1900), which contained numerous statements by well-known personalities from art, literature and science. Apart from Falckenberg himself, among the authors were Michael Georg Conrad, Fanny zu Reventlow, Ernst von Wildenbruch and the youth editor Georg Hirth.

With the support of the Social Democrats in the Reichstag, these protests achieved some changes that led to a compromise version in the third reading on 22 May, in which both the “art” or “shop window” and the "theater paragraph" were deleted without replacement. Even before the law was amended citizens circumvented censorship by labeling events as "private affairs".

== Text of the Law ==
Section 184 of the Reich Criminal Code – "Dissemination of obscene writings" – read in its final version:

unzüchtige Schriften, Abbildungen oder Darstellungen feilhält, verkauft, verteilt, an Orten, welche dem Publikum zugänglich sind, ausstellt oder anschlägt oder sonst verbreitet, sie zum Zwecke der Verbreitung herstellt oder zu demselben Zwecke vorrätig hält, ankündigt oder anpreist; unzüchtige Schriften, Abbildungen oder Darstellungen einer Person unter sechzehn Jahren gegen Entgelt überläßt oder anbietet; Gegenstände, die zu unzüchtigem Gebrauche bestimmt sind, an Orten, welche dem Publikum zugänglich sind, ausstellt oder solche Gegenstände dem Publikum ankündigt oder anpreist; öffentliche Ankündigungen erläßt, welche dazu bestimmt sind, unzüchtigen Verkehr herbeizuführen.

"Anyone who

offers for sale, sells, distributes, exhibits or posts or otherwise distributes indecent writings, illustrations or representations in places accessible to the public, produces them for the purpose of distribution or keeps them in stock for the same purpose, announces or promotes them;

provides or offers indecent writings, illustrations or representations to a person under the age of sixteen for a fee;

exhibits objects intended for indecent use in places accessible to the public or announces or advertises such objects to the public;

issues public announcements designed to induce indecent intercourse.

In addition to imprisonment, a loss of civil rights and the admissibility of police supervision can be recognized."

The Lex Heinze can be seen as a forerunner of the criminal offenses of public nuisance, distribution of pornographic writings, promotion of sexual acts by minors and pimping in today's German penal code.

== Bibliography ==
- Das Buch von der Lex Heinze. Ein Kulturdokument aus dem Anfange des zwanzigsten Jahrhunderts. Hg. von Otto Falckenberg. L. Staackmann, Leipzig 1900.
- Georg von Vollmar: Für die Freiheit der Kunst! Rede gegen die §§ 184 a und b der sogenannten Lex Heinze, gehalten in der Sitzung des Reichstages vom 15. März 1900. L. Pickelmann, München 1900.
- Hermann Roeren: Die Lex Heinze und ihre Gefahr für Kunst, Litteratur und Sittlichkeit. J. P. Bachem, Köln 1910.
- Peter Mast: Künstlerische und wissenschaftliche Freiheit im Deutschen Reich 1890–1901. Umsturzvorlage und Lex Heinze sowie die Fälle Arons und Spahn im Schnittpunkt der Interessen von Besitzbürgertum, Katholizismus und Staat. 3. Aufl. Schäuble Verlag, Rheinfelden 1994. ISBN 3-87718-018-3
