= Hermann Roeren =

German lawyer and member of the Reichstag

Hermann Roeren (29 March 1844 – 23 December 1920) was a German lawyer and member of the Reichstag.

Roeren was born in Rüthen, Westphalia, and died, aged 76, in Cologne (Köln-Lindenthal).

== Sources ==
- http://www.reichstag-abgeordnetendatenbank.de/selectmaske.html?pnd=116593067&recherche=ja
