= Oriental Coin Cabinet Jena =

- Interactive fullscreen map
- Location: Jena, Germany
- Coordinates: 50.9275°N 11.5907°E

Oriental Coin Cabinet Jena (German: Orientalisches Münzkabinett Jena) is a collection of oriental coins at Jena University, in Jena, Germany, founded in 1840.

== History ==
In 1840, Johann Gustav Stickel, Professor for Oriental languages at Jena University, succeeded in convincing the Grandduke of Saxe-Weimar-Eisenach to acquire a collection of 1,500 Oriental coins, and allowing him to study them. The collection was formed by Heinrich August Zwick, missionary of the German Protestant Herrnhut-Brotherhood, in Russia. He lived at the missionary outpost and small town Sarepta at the banks of the Volga river from 1816 to 1832. He is regarded as one of the pioneers of the Volga archaeology.

Stickel won Maria Pavlovna, the Grand duchess, as the main benefactor of the collection, which in turn grew rapidly. At the death of Stickel in 1896 the collection comprised about 12,000 specimens. At the end of the 19th century the keen interest of Orientalist for Islamic coins as textual sources lost its momentum, because of the abundance of other now edited texts. In 1906 Stickel's successor, the Orientalist Karl Vollers gave the figure of about 14,000 specimens. He died in 1909.

The last professor for Oriental studies Arthur Ungnad left the University in 1919. In 1939, about 4,000 coins were given back to the now abdicated Grand-Ducal family. Several hundreds of coins were then lost in the aftermath of World War II. The collection was preserved during the period of the German Democratic Republic.

In 1994, Semitic Philology and Islamic Studies were revived at the Jena University. At that time the collection comprised still 8,690 coins. The scientific activities of the Oriental Coin cabinet were coordinated by Stefan Heidemann. The collection was then brought to live again as a modern scientific research tool for the history of the Islamic and Oriental world. With the help of generous private benefactors the collection now holds about 21,000 coins, covering an area from Morocco to East Asia.

== Sources of the collection ==
As of November 2012, the collection consists of around 21,000 Islamic coins and 1,200 East Asian coins. The Oriental Coin Cabinet in Jena contains collections from the following persons:

- Heinrich August Zwick (1796–1855; 1,500 coins)
- A selection of the collection of Daniel von Sprewitz (bought 1846; 175 coins)
- Justin Sabatier (bought 1852; 728 coins)
- August Otto Rühle von Lilienstern (1780–1847; 870 coins)
- Part of the collection of Frédéric Soret (1795–1865; ca. 1,000 coins)
- Heinrich von Siebold (1852–1908; 1,060 East Asian coins and amulets)
- Peter Jaeckel (1914–1996; 1,200 coins)
- Christof Baum (donated 2003; 307 Yemenite coins).
