= Johann Traugott Leberecht Danz =

German Lutheran theologian and church historian

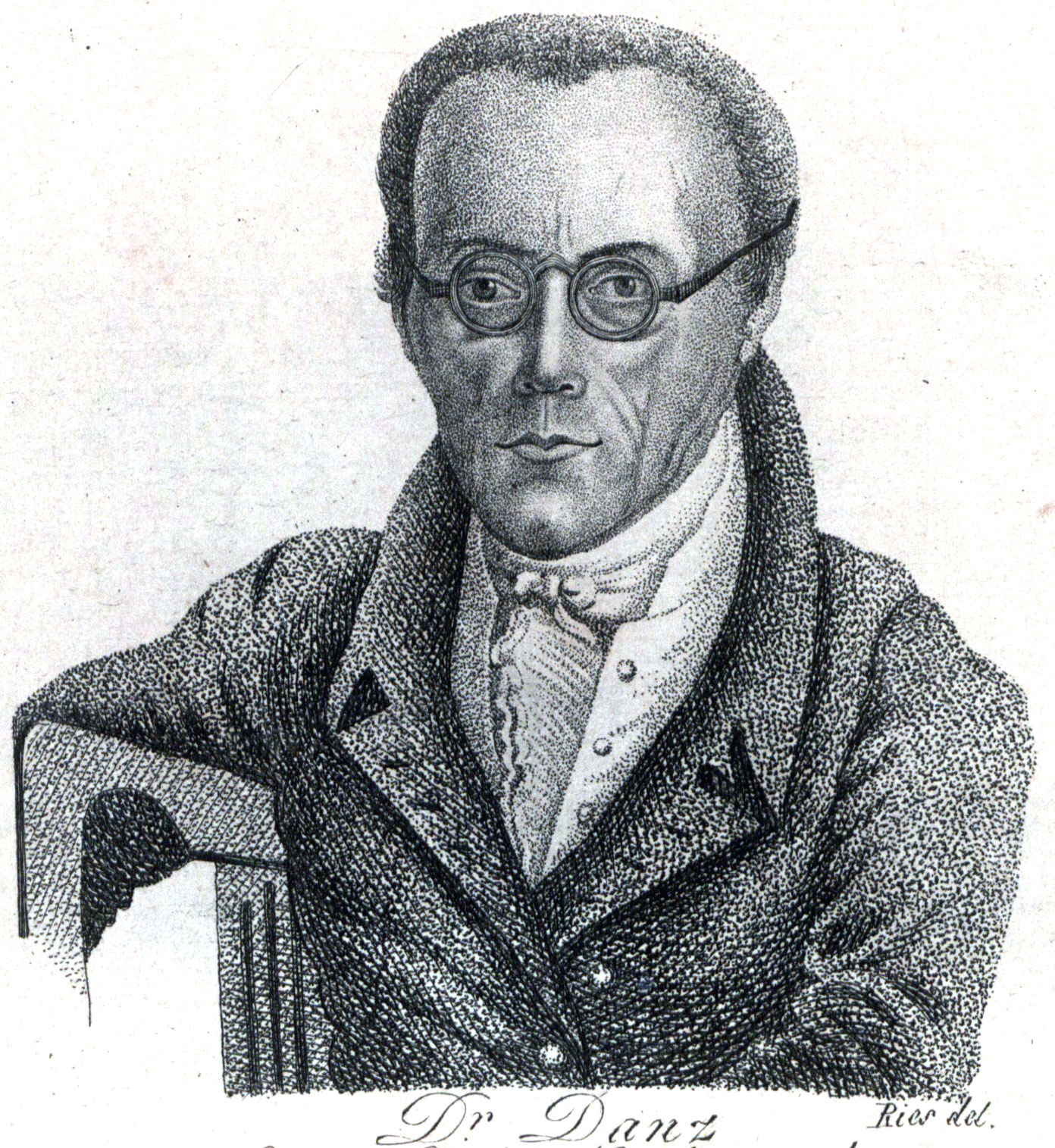
Johann Traugott Leberecht Danz

Johann Traugott Leberecht Danz (31 May 1769 – 15 May 1851) was a German Lutheran theologian and church historian born in Weimar.

In 1787 he began his studies at Jena, where he had as instructors, Johann Jakob Griesbach, Johann Christoph Döderlein and Johann Gottfried Eichhorn. In 1791 he continued his studies at the University of Göttingen, and afterwards returned to Weimar as a secondary school teacher. In 1809 he received his habilitation at Jena, and during the following year became an associate professor. From 1812 to 1838 he was a full professor of theology at the University of Jena.

Among his efforts were editions of Plautus (1806–9, 3 parts) and Aeschylus (1805–8, 2 parts), as well as a new edition of Johann Georg Walch's Bibliotheca patristica. He also published a two-volume textbook of church history (1816–26), and was editor of Johann Gottfried Herder's Ansichten des klassischen Alterthums (Views of Classical Antiquity 1805–6).

== Notable students ==
- Johann Gustav Stickel (1805–1896), a professor for oriental languages at Jena University.
