= List of cities and towns in Germany =

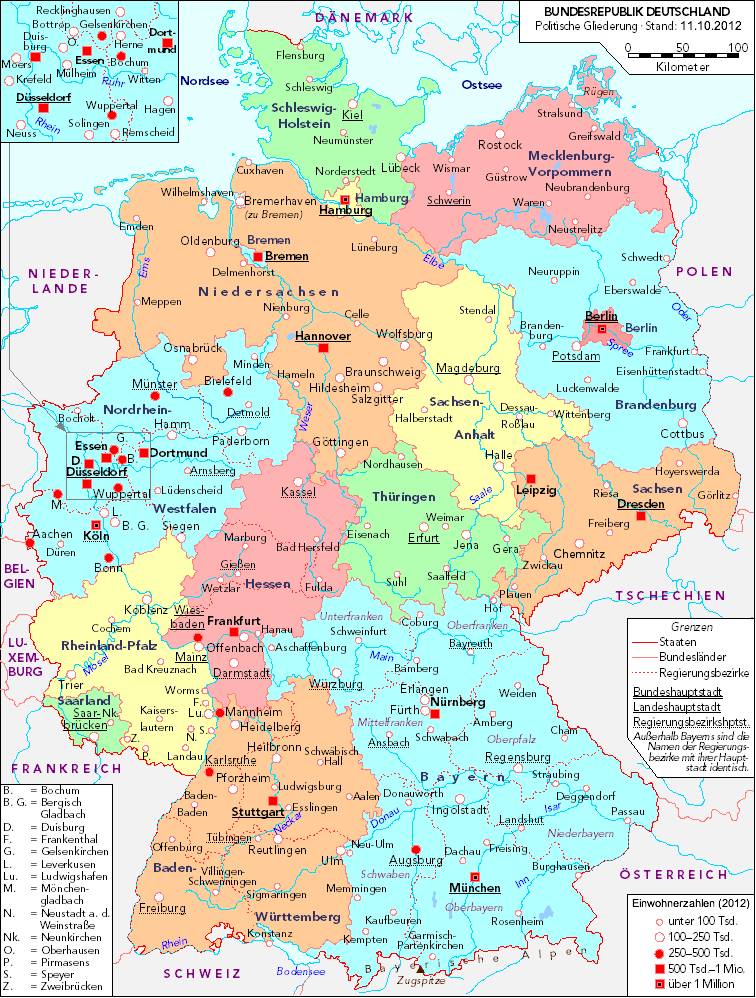
General map of Germany

This is a complete list of the 2,057 cities and towns in Germany (as of 28 January 2025). There is no distinction between town and city in Germany; a Stadt is an independent municipality (see Municipalities of Germany) that has been given the right to use that title. In contrast, the generally smaller German municipalities that do not use this title, and are thus not included here, are usually just called Gemeinden. Historically, the title Stadt was associated with town privileges, but today it is a mere honorific title. The title can be bestowed to a municipality by its respective state government and is generally given to such municipalities that have either had historic town rights or have attained considerable size and importance more recently. Towns with over 100,000 inhabitants are called Großstadt, a statistical notion sometimes translated as "city", but having no effect on their administrative status. In this list, only the cities' and towns' names are given. For more restricted lists with more details, see:

- List of cities in Germany by population (only Großstädte, i.e. cities over 100,000 population)
- Metropolitan regions in Germany

Numbers of cities and towns in the German states:

- Bavaria: 318 cities and towns
- Baden-Württemberg: 316 cities and towns
- North Rhine-Westphalia: 272 cities and towns
- Hesse: 191 cities and towns
- Saxony: 169 cities and towns
- Lower Saxony: 159 cities and towns
- Rhineland-Palatinate: 130 cities and towns
- Thuringia: 117 cities and towns
- Brandenburg: 113 cities and towns
- Saxony-Anhalt: 104 cities and towns
- Mecklenburg-Western Pomerania: 84 cities and towns, see list
- Schleswig-Holstein: 63 cities and towns
- Saarland: 17 cities and towns
- Bremen: 2 cities
- Berlin: 1 city
- Hamburg: 1 city

== A ==
- Aach (Baden-Württemberg)
- Aachen (North Rhine-Westphalia)
- Aalen (Baden-Württemberg)
- Abenberg (Bavaria)
- Abensberg (Bavaria)
- Achern (Baden-Württemberg)
- Achim (Lower Saxony)
- Adelsheim (Baden-Württemberg)
- Adenau (Rhineland-Palatinate)
- Adorf (Saxony)
- Ahaus (North Rhine-Westphalia)
- Ahlen (North Rhine-Westphalia)
- Ahrensburg (Schleswig-Holstein)
- Aichach (Bavaria)
- Aichtal (Baden-Württemberg)
- Aken (Elbe) (Saxony-Anhalt)
- Albstadt (Baden-Württemberg)
- Alfeld (Lower Saxony)
- Allendorf (Lumda) (Hesse)
- Allstedt (Saxony-Anhalt)
- Alpirsbach (Baden-Württemberg)
- Alsdorf (North Rhine-Westphalia)
- Alsfeld (Hesse)
- Alsleben (Saale) (Saxony-Anhalt)
- Altdorf bei Nürnberg (Bavaria)
- Altena (North Rhine-Westphalia)
- Altenberg (Saxony)
- Altenburg (Thuringia)
- Altenkirchen (Rhineland-Palatinate)
- Altensteig (Baden-Württemberg)
- Altentreptow (Mecklenburg-Western Pomerania)
- Altlandsberg (Brandenburg)
- Altötting (Bavaria)
- Alzenau (Bavaria)
- Alzey (Rhineland-Palatinate)
- Amberg (Bavaria)
- Amöneburg (Hesse)
- Amorbach (Bavaria)
- Amt Creuzburg (Thuringia)
- An der Schmücke (Thuringia)
- Andernach (Rhineland-Palatinate)
- Angermünde (Brandenburg)
- Anklam (Mecklenburg-Western Pomerania)
- Annaberg-Buchholz (Saxony)
- Annaburg (Saxony-Anhalt)
- Annweiler am Trifels (Rhineland-Palatinate)
- Ansbach (Bavaria)
- Apolda (Thuringia)
- Arendsee (Saxony-Anhalt)
- Arneburg (Saxony-Anhalt)
- Arnis (Schleswig-Holstein)
- Arnsberg (North Rhine-Westphalia)
- Arnstadt (Thuringia)
- Arnstein (Bavaria)
- Arnstein (Saxony-Anhalt)
- Artern (Thuringia)
- Arzberg (Bavaria)
- Aschaffenburg (Bavaria)
- Aschersleben (Saxony-Anhalt)
- Asperg (Baden-Württemberg)
- Aßlar (Hesse)
- Attendorn (North Rhine-Westphalia)
- Aub (Bavaria)
- Aue-Bad Schlema (Saxony)
- Auerbach in der Oberpfalz (Bavaria)
- Auerbach (Vogtland) (Saxony)
- Augsburg (Bavaria)
- Augustusburg (Saxony)
- Aulendorf (Baden-Württemberg)
- Auma-Weidatal (Thuringia)
- Aurich (Lower Saxony)

== B ==
- Babenhausen (Hesse)
- Bacharach (Rhineland-Palatinate)
- Backnang (Baden-Württemberg)
- Bad Aibling (Bavaria)
- Bad Arolsen (Hesse)
- Bad Belzig (Brandenburg)
- Bad Bentheim (Lower Saxony)
- Bad Bergzabern (Rhineland-Palatinate)
- Bad Berka (Thuringia)
- Bad Berleburg (North Rhine-Westphalia)
- Bad Berneck im Fichtelgebirge (Bavaria)
- Bad Bevensen (Lower Saxony)
- Bad Bibra (Saxony-Anhalt)
- Bad Blankenburg (Thuringia)
- Bad Bramstedt (Schleswig-Holstein)
- Bad Breisig (Rhineland-Palatinate)
- Bad Brückenau (Bavaria)
- Bad Buchau (Baden-Württemberg)
- Bad Camberg (Hesse)
- Bad Doberan (Mecklenburg-Western Pomerania)
- Bad Driburg (North Rhine-Westphalia)
- Bad Düben (Saxony)
- Bad Dürkheim (Rhineland-Palatinate)
- Bad Dürrenberg (Saxony-Anhalt)
- Bad Dürrheim (Baden-Württemberg)
- Bad Elster (Saxony)
- Bad Ems (Rhineland-Palatinate)
- Bad Fallingbostel (Lower Saxony)
- Bad Frankenhausen/Kyffhäuser (Thuringia)
- Bad Freienwalde (Oder) (Brandenburg)
- Bad Friedrichshall (Baden-Württemberg)
- Bad Gandersheim (Lower Saxony)
- Bad Gottleuba-Berggießhübel (Saxony)
- Bad Griesbach im Rottal (Bavaria)
- Bad Harzburg (Lower Saxony)
- Bad Herrenalb (Baden-Württemberg)
- Bad Hersfeld (Hesse)
- Bad Homburg vor der Höhe (Hesse)
- Bad Honnef (North Rhine-Westphalia)
- Bad Hönningen (Rhineland-Palatinate)
- Bad Iburg (Lower Saxony)
- Bad Karlshafen (Hesse)
- Bad Kissingen (Bavaria)
- Bad König (Hesse)
- Bad Königshofen im Grabfeld (Bavaria)
- Bad Köstritz (Thuringia)
- Bad Kötzting (Bavaria)
- Bad Kreuznach (Rhineland-Palatinate)
- Bad Krozingen (Baden-Württemberg)
- Bad Laasphe (North Rhine-Westphalia)
- Bad Langensalza (Thuringia)
- Bad Lauchstädt (Saxony-Anhalt)
- Bad Lausick (Saxony)
- Bad Lauterberg im Harz (Lower Saxony)
- Bad Liebenstein (Thuringia)
- Bad Liebenwerda (Brandenburg)
- Bad Liebenzell (Baden-Württemberg)
- Bad Lippspringe (North Rhine-Westphalia)
- Bad Lobenstein (Thuringia)
- Bad Marienberg (Rhineland-Palatinate)
- Bad Mergentheim (Baden-Württemberg)
- Bad Münder am Deister (Lower Saxony)
- Bad Münstereifel (North Rhine-Westphalia)
- Bad Muskau (Saxony)
- Bad Nauheim (Hesse)
- Bad Nenndorf (Lower Saxony)
- Bad Neuenahr-Ahrweiler (Rhineland-Palatinate)
- Bad Neustadt an der Saale (Bavaria)
- Bad Oeynhausen (North Rhine-Westphalia)
- Bad Oldesloe (Schleswig-Holstein)
- Bad Orb (Hesse)
- Bad Pyrmont (Lower Saxony)
- Bad Rappenau (Baden-Württemberg)
- Bad Reichenhall (Bavaria)
- Bad Rodach (Bavaria)
- Bad Sachsa (Lower Saxony)
- Bad Säckingen (Baden-Württemberg)
- Bad Salzdetfurth (Lower Saxony)
- Bad Salzuflen (North Rhine-Westphalia)
- Bad Salzungen (Thuringia)
- Bad Saulgau (Baden-Württemberg)
- Bad Schandau (Saxony)
- Bad Schmiedeberg (Saxony-Anhalt)
- Bad Schussenried (Baden-Württemberg)
- Bad Schwalbach (Hesse)
- Bad Schwartau (Schleswig-Holstein)
- Bad Segeberg (Schleswig-Holstein)
- Bad Sobernheim (Rhineland-Palatinate)
- Bad Soden am Taunus (Hesse)
- Bad Soden-Salmünster (Hesse)
- Bad Sooden-Allendorf (Hesse)
- Bad Staffelstein (Bavaria)
- Bad Sulza (Thuringia)
- Bad Sülze (Mecklenburg-Western Pomerania)
- Bad Teinach-Zavelstein (Baden-Württemberg)
- Bad Tennstedt (Thuringia)
- Bad Tölz (Bavaria)
- Bad Urach (Baden-Württemberg)
- Bad Vilbel (Hesse)
- Bad Waldsee (Baden-Württemberg)
- Bad Weißenstadt (Bavaria)
- Bad Wildbad (Baden-Württemberg)
- Bad Wildungen (Hesse)
- Bad Wilsnack (Brandenburg)
- Bad Wimpfen (Baden-Württemberg)
- Bad Windsheim (Bavaria)
- Bad Wörishofen (Bavaria)
- Bad Wünnenberg (North Rhine-Westphalia)
- Bad Wurzach (Baden-Württemberg)
- Baden-Baden (Baden-Württemberg)
- Baesweiler (North Rhine-Westphalia)
- Baiersdorf (Bavaria)
- Balingen (Baden-Württemberg)
- Ballenstedt (Saxony-Anhalt)
- Balve (North Rhine-Westphalia)
- Bamberg (Bavaria)
- Barby (Elbe) (Saxony-Anhalt)
- Bargteheide (Schleswig-Holstein)
- Barmstedt (Schleswig-Holstein)
- Bärnau (Bavaria)
- Barntrup (North Rhine-Westphalia)
- Barsinghausen (Lower Saxony)
- Barth (Mecklenburg-Western Pomerania)
- Baruth/Mark (Brandenburg)
- Bassum (Lower Saxony)
- Battenberg (Hesse)
- Baumholder (Rhineland-Palatinate)
- Baunach (Bavaria)
- Baunatal (Hesse)
- Bautzen (Saxony)
- Bayreuth (Bavaria)
- Bebra (Hesse)
- Beckum (North Rhine-Westphalia)
- Bedburg (North Rhine-Westphalia)
- Beelitz (Brandenburg)
- Beeskow (Brandenburg)
- Beilngries (Bavaria)
- Beilstein (Baden-Württemberg)
- Belgern-Schildau (Saxony)
- Bendorf (Rhineland-Palatinate)
- Bensheim (Hesse)
- Berching (Bavaria)
- Berga-Wünschendorf (Thuringia)
- Bergen (Lower Saxony)
- Bergen auf Rügen (Mecklenburg-Western Pomerania)
- Bergheim (North Rhine-Westphalia)
- Bergisch Gladbach (North Rhine-Westphalia)
- Bergkamen (North Rhine-Westphalia)
- Bergneustadt (North Rhine-Westphalia)
- Berlin (Berlin)
- Bernau bei Berlin (Brandenburg)
- Bernburg (Saxony-Anhalt)
- Bernkastel-Kues (Rhineland-Palatinate)
- Bernsdorf (Saxony)
- Bernstadt a. d. Eigen (Saxony)
- Bersenbrück (Lower Saxony)
- Besigheim (Baden-Württemberg)
- Betzdorf (Rhineland-Palatinate)
- Betzenstein (Bavaria)
- Beverungen (North Rhine-Westphalia)
- Bexbach (Saarland)
- Biberach an der Riß (Baden-Württemberg)
- Biedenkopf (Hesse)
- Bielefeld (North Rhine-Westphalia)
- Biesenthal (Brandenburg)
- Bietigheim-Bissingen (Baden-Württemberg)
- Billerbeck (North Rhine-Westphalia)
- Bingen am Rhein (Rhineland-Palatinate)
- Birkenfeld (Rhineland-Palatinate)
- Bischofsheim in der Rhön (Bavaria)
- Bischofswerda (Saxony)
- Bismark (Altmark) (Saxony-Anhalt)
- Bitburg (Rhineland-Palatinate)
- Bitterfeld-Wolfen (Saxony-Anhalt)
- Blankenburg (Harz) (Saxony-Anhalt)
- Blankenhain (Thuringia)
- Blaubeuren (Baden-Württemberg)
- Blaustein (Baden-Württemberg)
- Bleckede (Lower Saxony)
- Bleicherode (Thuringia)
- Blieskastel (Saarland)
- Blomberg (North Rhine-Westphalia)
- Blumberg (Baden-Württemberg)
- Bobingen (Bavaria)
- Böblingen (Baden-Württemberg)
- Bocholt (North Rhine-Westphalia)
- Bochum (North Rhine-Westphalia)
- Bockenem (Lower Saxony)
- Bodenwerder (Lower Saxony)
- Bogen (Bavaria)
- Böhlen (Saxony)
- Boizenburg (Mecklenburg-Western Pomerania)
- Bonn (North Rhine-Westphalia)
- Bonndorf im Schwarzwald (Baden-Württemberg)
- Bönnigheim (Baden-Württemberg)
- Bopfingen (Baden-Württemberg)
- Boppard (Rhineland-Palatinate)
- Borgentreich (North Rhine-Westphalia)
- Borgholzhausen (North Rhine-Westphalia)
- Borken (North Rhine-Westphalia)
- Borken (Hesse) (Hesse)
- Borkum (Lower Saxony)
- Borna (Saxony)
- Bornheim (North Rhine-Westphalia)
- Bottrop (North Rhine-Westphalia)
- Boxberg (Baden-Württemberg)
- Brackenheim (Baden-Württemberg)
- Brake (Unterweser) (Lower Saxony)
- Brakel (North Rhine-Westphalia)
- Bramsche (Lower Saxony)
- Brandenburg an der Havel (Brandenburg)
- Brand-Erbisdorf (Saxony)
- Brandis (Saxony)
- Braubach (Rhineland-Palatinate)
- Braunfels (Hesse)
- Braunlage (Lower Saxony)
- Bräunlingen (Baden-Württemberg)
- Braunsbedra (Saxony-Anhalt)
- Braunschweig (Lower Saxony)
- Breckerfeld (North Rhine-Westphalia)
- Bredstedt (Schleswig-Holstein)
- Breisach (Baden-Württemberg)
- Bremen (Bremen)
- Bremerhaven (Bremen)
- Bremervörde (Lower Saxony)
- Bretten (Baden-Württemberg)
- Breuberg (Hesse)
- Brilon (North Rhine-Westphalia)
- Brotterode-Trusetal (Thuringia)
- Bruchköbel (Hesse)
- Bruchsal (Baden-Württemberg)
- Brück (Brandenburg)
- Brüel (Mecklenburg-Western Pomerania)
- Brühl (North Rhine-Westphalia)
- Brunsbüttel (Schleswig-Holstein)
- Brüssow (Brandenburg)
- Buchen (Odenwald) (Baden-Württemberg)
- Buchholz in der Nordheide (Lower Saxony)
- Buchloe (Bavaria)
- Bückeburg (Lower Saxony)
- Buckow (Brandenburg)
- Büdelsdorf (Schleswig-Holstein)
- Büdingen (Hesse)
- Bühl (Baden-Württemberg)
- Bünde (North Rhine-Westphalia)
- Büren (North Rhine-Westphalia)
- Burg (Saxony-Anhalt)
- Burgau (Bavaria)
- Burgbernheim (Bavaria)
- Burgdorf (Lower Saxony)
- Bürgel (Thuringia)
- Burghausen (Bavaria)
- Burgkunstadt (Bavaria)
- Burglengenfeld (Bavaria)
- Burgstädt (Saxony)
- Burg Stargard (Mecklenburg-Western Pomerania)
- Burgwedel (Lower Saxony)
- Burladingen (Baden-Württemberg)
- Burscheid (North Rhine-Westphalia)
- Bürstadt (Hesse)
- Butzbach (Hesse)
- Bützow (Mecklenburg-Western Pomerania)
- Buxtehude (Lower Saxony)

== C ==
- Calau (Brandenburg)
- Calbe (Saale) (Saxony-Anhalt)
- Calw (Baden-Württemberg)
- Castrop-Rauxel (North Rhine-Westphalia)
- Celle (Lower Saxony)
- Cham (Bavaria)
- Chemnitz (Saxony)
- Clausthal-Zellerfeld (Lower Saxony)
- Clingen (Thuringia)
- Cloppenburg (Lower Saxony)
- Coburg (Bavaria)
- Cochem (Rhineland-Palatinate)
- Coesfeld (North Rhine-Westphalia)
- Colditz (Saxony)
- Cologne (North Rhine-Westphalia)
- Coswig (Saxony)
- Coswig (Anhalt) (Saxony-Anhalt)
- Cottbus (Brandenburg)
- Crailsheim (Baden-Württemberg)
- Creglingen (Baden-Württemberg)
- Creußen (Bavaria)
- Crimmitschau (Saxony)
- Crivitz (Mecklenburg-Western Pomerania)
- Cuxhaven (Lower Saxony)

== D ==
- Daaden (Rhineland-Palatinate)
- Dachau (Bavaria)
- Dahlen (Saxony)
- Dahme/Mark (Brandenburg)
- Dahn (Rhineland-Palatinate)
- Damme (Lower Saxony)
- Dannenberg (Elbe) (Lower Saxony)
- Dargun (Mecklenburg-Western Pomerania)
- Darmstadt (Hesse)
- Dassel (Lower Saxony)
- Dassow (Mecklenburg-Western Pomerania)
- Datteln (North Rhine-Westphalia)
- Daun (Rhineland-Palatinate)
- Degenfeld (Baden-Württemberg)
- Deggendorf (Bavaria)
- Deidesheim (Rhineland-Palatinate)
- Delbrück (North Rhine-Westphalia)
- Delitzsch (Saxony)
- Delmenhorst (Lower Saxony)
- Demmin (Mecklenburg-Western Pomerania)
- Dessau-Roßlau (Saxony-Anhalt)
- Detmold (North Rhine-Westphalia)
- Dettelbach (Bavaria)
- Dieburg (Hesse)
- Diemelstadt (Hesse)
- Diepholz (Lower Saxony)
- Dierdorf (Rhineland-Palatinate)
- Dietenheim (Baden-Württemberg)
- Dietfurt an der Altmühl (Bavaria)
- Dietzenbach (Hesse)
- Diez (Rhineland-Palatinate)
- Dillenburg (Hesse)
- Dillingen an der Donau (Bavaria)
- Dillingen/Saar (Saarland)
- Dingelstädt (Thuringia)
- Dingolfing (Bavaria)
- Dinkelsbühl (Bavaria)
- Dinklage (Lower Saxony)
- Dinslaken (North Rhine-Westphalia)
- Dippoldiswalde (Saxony)
- Dissen am Teutoburger Wald (Lower Saxony)
- Ditzingen (Baden-Württemberg)
- Döbeln (Saxony)
- Doberlug-Kirchhain (Brandenburg)
- Döbern (Brandenburg)
- Dohna (Saxony)
- Dömitz (Mecklenburg-Western Pomerania)
- Dommitzsch (Saxony)
- Donaueschingen (Baden-Württemberg)
- Donauwörth (Bavaria)
- Donzdorf (Baden-Württemberg)
- Dorfen (Bavaria)
- Dormagen (North Rhine-Westphalia)
- Dornburg-Camburg (Thuringia)
- Dornhan (Baden-Württemberg)
- Dornstetten (Baden-Württemberg)
- Dorsten (North Rhine-Westphalia)
- Dortmund (North Rhine-Westphalia)
- Dransfeld (Lower Saxony)
- Drebkau (Brandenburg)
- Dreieich (Hesse)
- Drensteinfurt (North Rhine-Westphalia)
- Dresden (Saxony)
- Drolshagen (North Rhine-Westphalia)
- Duderstadt (Lower Saxony)
- Duisburg (North Rhine-Westphalia)
- Dülmen (North Rhine-Westphalia)
- Düren (North Rhine-Westphalia)
- Düsseldorf (North Rhine-Westphalia)

== E ==
- Ebeleben (Thuringia)
- Eberbach (Baden-Württemberg)
- Ebermannstadt (Bavaria)
- Ebern (Bavaria)
- Ebersbach an der Fils (Baden-Württemberg)
- Ebersbach-Neugersdorf (Saxony)
- Ebersberg (Bavaria)
- Eberswalde (Brandenburg)
- Eckartsberga (Saxony-Anhalt)
- Eckernförde (Schleswig-Holstein)
- Edenkoben (Rhineland-Palatinate)
- Egeln (Saxony-Anhalt)
- Eggenfelden (Bavaria)
- Eggesin (Mecklenburg-Western Pomerania)
- Ehingen (Donau) (Baden-Württemberg)
- Ehrenfriedersdorf (Saxony)
- Eibelstadt (Bavaria)
- Eibenstock (Saxony)
- Eichstätt (Bavaria)
- Eilenburg (Saxony)
- Einbeck (Lower Saxony)
- Eisenach (Thuringia)
- Eisenberg (Thuringia)
- Eisenberg (Pfalz) (Rhineland-Palatinate)
- Eisenhüttenstadt (Brandenburg)
- Eisfeld (Thuringia)
- Eisleben (Saxony-Anhalt)
- Eislingen/Fils (Baden-Württemberg)
- Ellingen (Bavaria)
- Ellrich (Thuringia)
- Ellwangen (Baden-Württemberg)
- Elmshorn (Schleswig-Holstein)
- Elsdorf (North Rhine-Westphalia)
- Elsfleth (Lower Saxony)
- Elsterberg (Saxony)
- Elsterwerda (Brandenburg)
- Elstra (Saxony)
- Elterlein (Saxony)
- Eltmann (Bavaria)
- Eltville am Rhein (Hesse)
- Elzach (Baden-Württemberg)
- Elze (Lower Saxony)
- Emden (Lower Saxony)
- Emmelshausen (Rhineland-Palatinate)
- Emmendingen (Baden-Württemberg)
- Emmerich am Rhein (North Rhine-Westphalia)
- Emsdetten (North Rhine-Westphalia)
- Endingen (Baden-Württemberg)
- Engen (Baden-Württemberg)
- Enger (North Rhine-Westphalia)
- Ennepetal (North Rhine-Westphalia)
- Ennigerloh (North Rhine-Westphalia)
- Eppelheim (Baden-Württemberg)
- Eppingen (Baden-Württemberg)
- Eppstein (Hesse)
- Erbach (Donau) (Baden-Württemberg)
- Erbach (Hesse)
- Erbendorf (Bavaria)
- Erding (Bavaria)
- Erftstadt (North Rhine-Westphalia)
- Erfurt (Thuringia)
- Erkelenz (North Rhine-Westphalia)
- Erkner (Brandenburg)
- Erkrath (North Rhine-Westphalia)
- Erlangen (Bavaria)
- Erlenbach am Main (Bavaria)
- Erlensee (Hesse)
- Erwitte (North Rhine-Westphalia)
- Eschborn (Hesse)
- Eschenbach in der Oberpfalz (Bavaria)
- Eschershausen (Lower Saxony)
- Eschwege (Hesse)
- Eschweiler (North Rhine-Westphalia)
- Esens (Lower Saxony)
- Espelkamp (North Rhine-Westphalia)
- Essen (North Rhine-Westphalia)
- Esslingen am Neckar (Baden-Württemberg)
- Ettenheim (Baden-Württemberg)
- Ettlingen (Baden-Württemberg)
- Euskirchen (North Rhine-Westphalia)
- Eutin (Schleswig-Holstein)

== F ==
- Falkenberg/Elster (Brandenburg)
- Falkensee (Brandenburg)
- Falkenstein/Harz (Saxony-Anhalt)
- Falkenstein/Vogtl. (Saxony)
- Fehmarn (Schleswig-Holstein)
- Fellbach (Baden-Württemberg)
- Felsberg (Hesse)
- Feuchtwangen (Bavaria)
- Filderstadt (Baden-Württemberg)
- Finsterwalde (Brandenburg)
- Fladungen (Bavaria)
- Flensburg (Schleswig-Holstein)
- Flöha (Saxony)
- Flörsheim am Main (Hesse)
- Florstadt (Hesse)
- Floß (Bavaria)
- Forchheim (Bavaria)
- Forchtenberg (Baden-Württemberg)
- Forst (Lausitz) (Brandenburg)
- Frankenau (Hesse)
- Frankenberg (Eder) (Hesse)
- Frankenberg/Sa. (Saxony)
- Frankenthal (Pfalz) (Rhineland-Palatinate)
- Frankfurt am Main (Hesse)
- Frankfurt (Oder) (Brandenburg)
- Franzburg (Mecklenburg-Western Pomerania)
- Frauenstein (Saxony)
- Frechen (North Rhine-Westphalia)
- Freiberg am Neckar (Baden-Württemberg)
- Freiberg (Saxony)
- Freiburg im Breisgau (Baden-Württemberg)
- Freilassing (Bavaria)
- Freinsheim (Rhineland-Palatinate)
- Freising (Bavaria)
- Freital (Saxony)
- Freren (Lower Saxony)
- Freudenberg (Baden-Württemberg)
- Freudenberg (North Rhine-Westphalia)
- Freudenstadt (Baden-Württemberg)
- Freyburg (Unstrut) (Saxony-Anhalt)
- Freystadt (Bavaria)
- Freyung (Bavaria)
- Fridingen an der Donau (Baden-Württemberg)
- Friedberg (Bavaria)
- Friedberg (Hesse)
- Friedland (Mecklenburg-Western Pomerania)
- Friedland (Brandenburg)
- Friedrichroda (Thuringia)
- Friedrichsdorf (Hesse)
- Friedrichshafen (Baden-Württemberg)
- Friedrichstadt (Schleswig-Holstein)
- Friedrichsthal (Saarland)
- Friesack (Brandenburg)
- Friesoythe (Lower Saxony)
- Fritzlar (Hesse)
- Frohburg (Saxony)
- Fröndenberg (North Rhine-Westphalia)
- Fulda (Hesse)
- Fürstenau (Lower Saxony)
- Fürstenberg/Havel (Brandenburg)
- Fürstenfeldbruck (Bavaria)
- Fürstenwalde (Brandenburg)
- Fürth (Bavaria)
- Furth im Wald (Bavaria)
- Furtwangen im Schwarzwald (Baden-Württemberg)
- Füssen (Bavaria)

== G ==
- Gadebusch (Mecklenburg-Western Pomerania)
- Gaggenau (Baden-Württemberg)
- Gaildorf (Baden-Württemberg)
- Gammertingen (Baden-Württemberg)
- Garbsen (Lower Saxony)
- Garching bei München (Bavaria)
- Gardelegen (Saxony-Anhalt)
- Garding (Schleswig-Holstein)
- Gartz (Brandenburg)
- Garz/Rügen (Mecklenburg-Western Pomerania)
- Gau-Algesheim (Rhineland-Palatinate)
- Gebesee (Thuringia)
- Gedern (Hesse)
- Geesthacht (Schleswig-Holstein)
- Geestland (Lower Saxony)
- Gefell (Thuringia)
- Gefrees (Bavaria)
- Gehrden (Lower Saxony)
- Geilenkirchen (North Rhine-Westphalia)
- Geisa (Thuringia)
- Geiselhöring (Bavaria)
- Geisenfeld (Bavaria)
- Geisenheim (Hesse)
- Geisingen (Baden-Württemberg)
- Geislingen (bei Balingen) (Baden-Württemberg)
- Geislingen an der Steige (Baden-Württemberg)
- Geithain (Saxony)
- Geldern (North Rhine-Westphalia)
- Gelnhausen (Hesse)
- Gelsenkirchen (North Rhine-Westphalia)
- Gemünden am Main (Bavaria)
- Gemünden (Wohra) (Hesse)
- Gengenbach (Baden-Württemberg)
- Genthin (Saxony-Anhalt)
- Georgsmarienhütte (Lower Saxony)
- Gera (Thuringia)
- Gerabronn (Baden-Württemberg)
- Gerbstedt (Saxony-Anhalt)
- Geretsried (Bavaria)
- Geringswalde (Saxony)
- Gerlingen (Baden-Württemberg)
- Germering (Bavaria)
- Germersheim (Rhineland-Palatinate)
- Gernsbach (Baden-Württemberg)
- Gernsheim (Hesse)
- Gerolstein (Rhineland-Palatinate)
- Gerolzhofen (Bavaria)
- Gersfeld (Rhön) (Hesse)
- Gersthofen (Bavaria)
- Gescher (North Rhine-Westphalia)
- Geseke (North Rhine-Westphalia)
- Gevelsberg (North Rhine-Westphalia)
- Geyer (Saxony)
- Giengen an der Brenz (Baden-Württemberg)
- Giessen (Hesse)
- Gifhorn (Lower Saxony)
- Ginsheim-Gustavsburg (Hesse)
- Gladbeck (North Rhine-Westphalia)
- Gladenbach (Hesse)
- Glashütte (Saxony)
- Glauchau (Saxony)
- Glinde (Schleswig-Holstein)
- Glücksburg (Schleswig-Holstein)
- Glückstadt (Schleswig-Holstein)
- Gnoien (Mecklenburg-Western Pomerania)
- Goch (North Rhine-Westphalia)
- Goldberg (Mecklenburg-Western Pomerania)
- Goldkronach (Bavaria)
- Golßen (Brandenburg)
- Gommern (Saxony-Anhalt)
- Göppingen (Baden-Württemberg)
- Görlitz (Saxony)
- Goslar (Lower Saxony)
- Gößnitz (Thuringia)
- Gotha (Thuringia)
- Göttingen (Lower Saxony)
- Grabow (Mecklenburg-Western Pomerania)
- Grafenau (Bavaria)
- Gräfenberg (Bavaria)
- Gräfenhainichen (Saxony-Anhalt)
- Gräfenthal (Thuringia)
- Grafenwöhr (Bavaria)
- Grafing bei München (Bavaria)
- Gransee (Brandenburg)
- Grebenau (Hesse)
- Grebenstein (Hesse)
- Greding (Bavaria)
- Greifswald (Mecklenburg-Western Pomerania)
- Greiz (Thuringia)
- Greußen (Thuringia)
- Greven (North Rhine-Westphalia)
- Grevenbroich (North Rhine-Westphalia)
- Grevesmühlen (Mecklenburg-Western Pomerania)
- Griesheim (Hesse)
- Grimma (Saxony)
- Grimmen (Mecklenburg-Western Pomerania)
- Gröditz (Saxony)
- Groitzsch (Saxony)
- Gronau (Leine) (Lower Saxony)
- Gronau (Westf.) (North Rhine-Westphalia)
- Gröningen (Saxony-Anhalt)
- Großalmerode (Hesse)
- Groß-Bieberau (Hesse)
- Großbottwar (Baden-Württemberg)
- Großbreitenbach (Thuringia)
- Großenhain (Saxony)
- Groß-Gerau (Hesse)
- Großräschen (Brandenburg)
- Großröhrsdorf (Saxony)
- Großschirma (Saxony)
- Groß-Umstadt (Hesse)
- Grünberg (Hesse)
- Grünhain-Beierfeld (Saxony)
- Grünsfeld (Baden-Württemberg)
- Grünstadt (Rhineland-Palatinate)
- Guben (Brandenburg)
- Gudensberg (Hesse)
- Güglingen (Baden-Württemberg)
- Gummersbach (North Rhine-Westphalia)
- Gundelfingen an der Donau (Bavaria)
- Gundelsheim (Baden-Württemberg)
- Günzburg (Bavaria)
- Gunzenhausen (Bavaria)
- Güsten (Saxony-Anhalt)
- Güstrow (Mecklenburg-Western Pomerania)
- Gütersloh (North Rhine-Westphalia)
- Gützkow (Mecklenburg-Western Pomerania)

== H ==
- Haan (North Rhine-Westphalia)
- Haar (Bavaria)
- Hachenburg (Rhineland-Palatinate)
- Hadamar (Hesse)
- Hagen (North Rhine-Westphalia)
- Hagenbach (Rhineland-Palatinate)
- Hagenow (Mecklenburg-Western Pomerania)
- Haiger (Hesse)
- Haigerloch (Baden-Württemberg)
- Hainichen (Saxony)
- Haiterbach (Baden-Württemberg)
- Halberstadt (Saxony-Anhalt)
- Haldensleben (Saxony-Anhalt)
- Halle (Saale) (Saxony-Anhalt)
- Halle (North Rhine-Westphalia)
- Hallenberg (North Rhine-Westphalia)
- Hallstadt (Bavaria)
- Haltern am See (North Rhine-Westphalia)
- Halver (North Rhine-Westphalia)
- Hamburg (Hamburg)
- Hameln (Lower Saxony)
- Hamm (North Rhine-Westphalia)
- Hammelburg (Bavaria)
- Hamminkeln (North Rhine-Westphalia)
- Hanau (Hesse)
- Hann. Münden (Lower Saxony)
- Hanover (Lower Saxony)
- Harburg (Bavaria)
- Hardegsen (Lower Saxony)
- Haren (Ems) (Lower Saxony)
- Harsewinkel (North Rhine-Westphalia)
- Hartenstein (Saxony)
- Hartha (Saxony)
- Harzgerode (Saxony-Anhalt)
- Haselünne (Lower Saxony)
- Haslach im Kinzigtal (Baden-Württemberg)
- Haßfurt (Bavaria)
- Hattersheim am Main (Hesse)
- Hattingen (North Rhine-Westphalia)
- Hatzfeld (Eder) (Hesse)
- Hausach (Baden-Württemberg)
- Hauzenberg (Bavaria)
- Havelberg (Saxony-Anhalt)
- Havelsee (Brandenburg)
- Hayingen (Baden-Württemberg)
- Hechingen (Baden-Württemberg)
- Hecklingen (Saxony-Anhalt)
- Heide (Schleswig-Holstein)
- Heideck (Bavaria)
- Heidelberg (Baden-Württemberg)
- Heidenau (Saxony)
- Heidenheim an der Brenz (Baden-Württemberg)
- Heilbad Heiligenstadt (Thuringia)
- Heilbronn (Baden-Württemberg)
- Heiligenhafen (Schleswig-Holstein)
- Heiligenhaus (North Rhine-Westphalia)
- Heilsbronn (Bavaria)
- Heimbach (North Rhine-Westphalia)
- Heimsheim (Baden-Württemberg)
- Heinsberg (North Rhine-Westphalia)
- Heitersheim (Baden-Württemberg)
- Heldburg (Thuringia)
- Helmbrechts (Bavaria)
- Helmstedt (Lower Saxony)
- Hemau (Bavaria)
- Hemer (North Rhine-Westphalia)
- Hemmingen (Lower Saxony)
- Hemmoor (Lower Saxony)
- Hemsbach (Baden-Württemberg)
- Hennef (Sieg) (North Rhine-Westphalia)
- Hennigsdorf (Brandenburg)
- Heppenheim (Hesse)
- Herbolzheim (Baden-Württemberg)
- Herborn (Hesse)
- Herbrechtingen (Baden-Württemberg)
- Herbstein (Hesse)
- Herdecke (North Rhine-Westphalia)
- Herdorf (Rhineland-Palatinate)
- Herford (North Rhine-Westphalia)
- Heringen/Helme (Thuringia)
- Heringen (Hesse)
- Hermeskeil (Rhineland-Palatinate)
- Hermsdorf (Thuringia)
- Herne (North Rhine-Westphalia)
- Herrenberg (Baden-Württemberg)
- Herrieden (Bavaria)
- Herrnhut (Saxony)
- Hersbruck (Bavaria)
- Herten (North Rhine-Westphalia)
- Herzberg am Harz (Lower Saxony)
- Herzberg (Elster) (Brandenburg)
- Herzogenaurach (Bavaria)
- Herzogenrath (North Rhine-Westphalia)
- Hessisch Lichtenau (Hesse)
- Hessisch Oldendorf (Lower Saxony)
- Hettingen (Baden-Württemberg)
- Hettstedt (Saxony-Anhalt)
- Heubach (Baden-Württemberg)
- Heusenstamm (Hesse)
- Hilchenbach (North Rhine-Westphalia)
- Hildburghausen (Thuringia)
- Hilden (North Rhine-Westphalia)
- Hildesheim (Lower Saxony)
- Hillesheim (Rhineland-Palatinate)
- Hilpoltstein (Bavaria)
- Hirschau (Bavaria)
- Hirschberg (Thuringia)
- Hirschhorn (Neckar) (Hesse)
- Hitzacker (Lower Saxony)
- Hochheim am Main (Hesse)
- Höchstadt an der Aisch (Bavaria)
- Höchstädt an der Donau (Bavaria)
- Hockenheim (Baden-Württemberg)
- Hof (Bavaria)
- Hofgeismar (Hesse)
- Hofheim am Taunus (Hesse)
- Hofheim (Bavaria)
- Hohenberg an der Eger (Bavaria)
- Hohenleuben (Thuringia)
- Hohenmölsen (Saxony-Anhalt)
- Hohen Neuendorf (Brandenburg)
- Hohenstein-Ernstthal (Saxony)
- Hohnstein (Saxony)
- Höhr-Grenzhausen (Rhineland-Palatinate)
- Hollfeld (Bavaria)
- Holzgerlingen (Baden-Württemberg)
- Holzminden (Lower Saxony)
- Homberg (Efze) (Hesse)
- Homberg (Ohm) (Hesse)
- Homburg (Saar) (Saarland)
- Horb am Neckar (Baden-Württemberg)
- Hornbach (Rhineland-Palatinate)
- Horn-Bad Meinberg (North Rhine-Westphalia)
- Hornberg (Baden-Württemberg)
- Hörstel (North Rhine-Westphalia)
- Horstmar (North Rhine-Westphalia)
- Höxter (North Rhine-Westphalia)
- Hoya (Lower Saxony)
- Hoyerswerda (Saxony)
- Hückelhoven (North Rhine-Westphalia)
- Hückeswagen (North Rhine-Westphalia)
- Hüfingen (Baden-Württemberg)
- Hünfeld (Hesse)
- Hungen (Hesse)
- Hürth (North Rhine-Westphalia)
- Husum (Schleswig-Holstein)

== I ==
- Ibbenbüren (North Rhine-Westphalia)
- Ichenhausen (Bavaria)
- Idar-Oberstein (Rhineland-Palatinate)
- Idstein (Hesse)
- Illertissen (Bavaria)
- Ilmenau (Thuringia)
- Ilsenburg (Saxony-Anhalt)
- Ilshofen (Baden-Württemberg)
- Immenhausen (Hesse)
- Immenstadt im Allgäu (Bavaria)
- Ingelfingen (Baden-Württemberg)
- Ingelheim am Rhein (Rhineland-Palatinate)
- Ingolstadt (Bavaria)
- Iphofen (Bavaria)
- Iserlohn (North Rhine-Westphalia)
- Isny im Allgäu (Baden-Württemberg)
- Isselburg (North Rhine-Westphalia)
- Itzehoe (Schleswig-Holstein)

== J ==
- Jarmen (Mecklenburg-Western Pomerania)
- Jena (Thuringia)
- Jerichow (Saxony-Anhalt)
- Jessen (Elster) (Saxony-Anhalt)
- Jever (Lower Saxony)
- Joachimsthal (Brandenburg)
- Johanngeorgenstadt (Saxony)
- Jöhstadt (Saxony)
- Jüchen (North Rhine-Westphalia)
- Jülich (North Rhine-Westphalia)
- Jüterbog (Brandenburg)

== K ==
- Kaarst (North Rhine-Westphalia)
- Kahla (Thuringia)
- Kaisersesch (Rhineland-Palatinate)
- Kaiserslautern (Rhineland-Palatinate)
- Kalbe (Milde) (Saxony-Anhalt)
- Kalkar (North Rhine-Westphalia)
- Kaltenkirchen (Schleswig-Holstein)
- Kaltennordheim (Thuringia)
- Kamen (North Rhine-Westphalia)
- Kamenz (Saxony)
- Kamp-Lintfort (North Rhine-Westphalia)
- Kandel (Rhineland-Palatinate)
- Kandern (Baden-Württemberg)
- Kappeln (Schleswig-Holstein)
- Karben (Hesse)
- Karlsruhe (Baden-Württemberg)
- Karlstadt (Bavaria)
- Kassel (Hesse)
- Kastellaun (Rhineland-Palatinate)
- Katzenelnbogen (Rhineland-Palatinate)
- Kaub (Rhineland-Palatinate)
- Kaufbeuren (Bavaria)
- Kehl (Baden-Württemberg)
- Kelbra (Kyffhäuser) (Saxony-Anhalt)
- Kelheim (Bavaria)
- Kelkheim (Taunus) (Hesse)
- Kellinghusen (Schleswig-Holstein)
- Kelsterbach (Hesse)
- Kemberg (Saxony-Anhalt)
- Kemnath (Bavaria)
- Kempen (North Rhine-Westphalia)
- Kempten im Allgäu (Bavaria)
- Kenzingen (Baden-Württemberg)
- Kerpen (North Rhine-Westphalia)
- Ketzin/Havel (Brandenburg)
- Kevelaer (North Rhine-Westphalia)
- Kiel (Schleswig-Holstein)
- Kierspe (North Rhine-Westphalia)
- Kirchberg (Saxony)
- Kirchberg an der Jagst (Baden-Württemberg)
- Kirchberg (Hunsrück) (Rhineland-Palatinate)
- Kirchen (Sieg) (Rhineland-Palatinate)
- Kirchenlamitz (Bavaria)
- Kirchhain (Hesse)
- Kirchheimbolanden (Rhineland-Palatinate)
- Kirchheim unter Teck (Baden-Württemberg)
- Kirn (Rhineland-Palatinate)
- Kirtorf (Hesse)
- Kitzingen (Bavaria)
- Kitzscher (Saxony)
- Kleve (North Rhine-Westphalia)
- Klingenberg am Main (Bavaria)
- Klingenthal/Sa. (Saxony)
- Klötze (Saxony-Anhalt)
- Klütz (Mecklenburg-Western Pomerania)
- Knittlingen (Baden-Württemberg)
- Koblenz (Rhineland-Palatinate)
- Kolbermoor (Bavaria)
- Kölleda (Thuringia)
- Königsberg in Bayern (Bavaria)
- Königsbrück (Saxony)
- Königsbrunn (Bavaria)
- Königsee (Thuringia)
- Königslutter (Lower Saxony)
- Königstein im Taunus (Hesse)
- Königstein (Sächsische Schweiz) (Saxony)
- Königswinter (North Rhine-Westphalia)
- Königs Wusterhausen (Brandenburg)
- Könnern (Saxony-Anhalt)
- Konstanz (Baden-Württemberg)
- Konz (Rhineland-Palatinate)
- Korbach (Hesse)
- Korntal-Münchingen (Baden-Württemberg)
- Kornwestheim (Baden-Württemberg)
- Korschenbroich (North Rhine-Westphalia)
- Köthen (Saxony-Anhalt)
- Kraichtal (Baden-Württemberg)
- Krakow am See (Mecklenburg-Western Pomerania)
- Kranichfeld (Thuringia)
- Krautheim (Baden-Württemberg)
- Krefeld (North Rhine-Westphalia)
- Kremmen (Brandenburg)
- Krempe (Schleswig-Holstein)
- Kreuztal (North Rhine-Westphalia)
- Kronach (Bavaria)
- Kronberg im Taunus (Hesse)
- Kröpelin (Mecklenburg-Western Pomerania)
- Kroppenstedt (Saxony-Anhalt)
- Krumbach (Bavaria)
- Kühlungsborn (Mecklenburg-Western Pomerania)
- Kulmbach (Bavaria)
- Külsheim (Baden-Württemberg)
- Künzelsau (Baden-Württemberg)
- Kupferberg (Bavaria)
- Kuppenheim (Baden-Württemberg)
- Kusel (Rhineland-Palatinate)
- Kyllburg (Rhineland-Palatinate)
- Kyritz (Brandenburg)

== L ==
- Laage (Mecklenburg-Western Pomerania)
- Laatzen (Lower Saxony)
- Ladenburg (Baden-Württemberg)
- Lage (North Rhine-Westphalia)
- Lahnstein (Rhineland-Palatinate)
- Lahr/Schwarzwald (Baden-Württemberg)
- Laichingen (Baden-Württemberg)
- Lambrecht (Pfalz) (Rhineland-Palatinate)
- Lampertheim (Hesse)
- Landau an der Isar (Bavaria)
- Landau in der Pfalz (Rhineland-Palatinate)
- Landsberg am Lech (Bavaria)
- Landsberg (Saxony-Anhalt)
- Landshut (Bavaria)
- Landstuhl (Rhineland-Palatinate)
- Langelsheim (Lower Saxony)
- Langen (Hesse) (Hesse)
- Langenau (Baden-Württemberg)
- Langenburg (Baden-Württemberg)
- Langenfeld (Rhineland) (North Rhine-Westphalia)
- Langenhagen (Lower Saxony)
- Langenselbold (Hesse)
- Langenzenn (Bavaria)
- Lassan (Mecklenburg-Western Pomerania)
- Laubach (Hesse)
- Laucha an der Unstrut (Saxony-Anhalt)
- Lauchhammer (Brandenburg)
- Lauchheim (Baden-Württemberg)
- Lauda-Königshofen (Baden-Württemberg)
- Lauenburg (Schleswig-Holstein)
- Lauf an der Pegnitz (Bavaria)
- Laufen (Bavaria)
- Laufenburg (Baden-Württemberg)
- Lauffen am Neckar (Baden-Württemberg)
- Lauingen (Donau) (Bavaria)
- Laupheim (Baden-Württemberg)
- Lauscha (Thuringia)
- Lauta (Saxony)
- Lauter-Bernsbach (Saxony)
- Lauterbach (Hesse) (Hesse)
- Lauterecken (Rhineland-Palatinate)
- Lauterstein (Baden-Württemberg)
- Lebach (Saarland)
- Lebus (Brandenburg)
- Leer (Lower Saxony)
- Lehesten (Thuringia)
- Lehrte (Lower Saxony)
- Leichlingen (North Rhine-Westphalia)
- Leimen (Baden-Württemberg)
- Leinefelde-Worbis (Thuringia)
- Leinfelden-Echterdingen (Baden-Württemberg)
- Leingarten (Baden-Württemberg)
- Leipheim (Bavaria)
- Leipzig (Saxony)
- Leisnig (Saxony)
- Lemgo (North Rhine-Westphalia)
- Lengenfeld (Saxony)
- Lengerich (North Rhine-Westphalia)
- Lennestadt (North Rhine-Westphalia)
- Lenzen (Brandenburg)
- Leonberg (Baden-Württemberg)
- Leun (Hesse)
- Leuna (Saxony-Anhalt)
- Leutenberg (Thuringia)
- Leutershausen (Bavaria)
- Leutkirch im Allgäu (Baden-Württemberg)
- Leverkusen (North Rhine-Westphalia)
- Lich (Hesse)
- Lichtenau (Baden-Württemberg)
- Lichtenau (North Rhine-Westphalia)
- Lichtenberg (Bavaria)
- Lichtenfels (Bavaria)
- Lichtenfels (Hesse)
- Lichtenstein/Sa. (Saxony)
- Liebenau (Hesse)
- Liebenwalde (Brandenburg)
- Lieberose (Brandenburg)
- Liebstadt (Saxony)
- Limbach-Oberfrohna (Saxony)
- Limburg an der Lahn (Hesse)
- Lindau (Bodensee) (Bavaria)
- Linden (Hesse)
- Lindenberg im Allgäu (Bavaria)
- Lindenfels (Hesse)
- Lindow (Mark) (Brandenburg)
- Lingen (Lower Saxony)
- Linnich (North Rhine-Westphalia)
- Linz am Rhein (Rhineland-Palatinate)
- Lippstadt (North Rhine-Westphalia)
- Löbau (Saxony)
- Löffingen (Baden-Württemberg)
- Lohmar (North Rhine-Westphalia)
- Lohne (Lower Saxony)
- Löhne (North Rhine-Westphalia)
- Lohr am Main (Bavaria)
- Loitz (Mecklenburg-Western Pomerania)
- Lollar (Hesse)
- Lommatzsch (Saxony)
- Löningen (Lower Saxony)
- Lorch (Baden-Württemberg)
- Lorch (Hesse)
- Lörrach (Baden-Württemberg)
- Lorsch (Hesse)
- Lößnitz (Saxony)
- Löwenstein (Baden-Württemberg)
- Lübbecke (North Rhine-Westphalia)
- Lübben (Spreewald) (Brandenburg)
- Lübbenau (Brandenburg)
- Lübeck (Schleswig-Holstein)
- Lübtheen (Mecklenburg-Western Pomerania)
- Lübz (Mecklenburg-Western Pomerania)
- Lüchow (Wendland) (Lower Saxony)
- Lucka (Thuringia)
- Luckau (Brandenburg)
- Luckenwalde (Brandenburg)
- Lüdenscheid (North Rhine-Westphalia)
- Lüdinghausen (North Rhine-Westphalia)
- Ludwigsburg (Baden-Württemberg)
- Ludwigsfelde (Brandenburg)
- Ludwigshafen am Rhein (Rhineland-Palatinate)
- Ludwigslust (Mecklenburg-Western Pomerania)
- Ludwigsstadt (Bavaria)
- Lugau/Erzgeb. (Saxony)
- Lügde (North Rhine-Westphalia)
- Lüneburg (Lower Saxony)
- Lünen (North Rhine-Westphalia)
- Lunzenau (Saxony)
- Lütjenburg (Schleswig-Holstein)
- Lützen (Saxony-Anhalt)
- Lychen (Brandenburg)

== M ==
- Magdala (Thuringia)
- Magdeburg (Saxony-Anhalt)
- Mahlberg (Baden-Württemberg)
- Mainbernheim (Bavaria)
- Mainburg (Bavaria)
- Maintal (Hesse)
- Mainz (Rhineland-Palatinate)
- Malchin (Mecklenburg-Western Pomerania)
- Malchow (Mecklenburg-Western Pomerania)
- Mannheim (Baden-Württemberg)
- Manderscheid (Rhineland-Palatinate)
- Mansfeld (Saxony-Anhalt)
- Marbach am Neckar (Baden-Württemberg)
- Marburg (Hesse)
- Marienberg (Saxony)
- Marienmünster (North Rhine-Westphalia)
- Markdorf (Baden-Württemberg)
- Markgröningen (Baden-Württemberg)
- Märkisch Buchholz (Brandenburg)
- Markkleeberg (Saxony)
- Markneukirchen (Saxony)
- Markranstädt (Saxony)
- Marktbreit (Bavaria)
- Marktheidenfeld (Bavaria)
- Marktleuthen (Bavaria)
- Marktoberdorf (Bavaria)
- Marktredwitz (Bavaria)
- Marktsteft (Bavaria)
- Marl (North Rhine-Westphalia)
- Marlow (Mecklenburg-Western Pomerania)
- Marne (Schleswig-Holstein)
- Marsberg (North Rhine-Westphalia)
- Maulbronn (Baden-Württemberg)
- Maxhütte-Haidhof (Bavaria)
- Mayen (Rhineland-Palatinate)
- Mechernich (North Rhine-Westphalia)
- Meckenheim (North Rhine-Westphalia)
- Medebach (North Rhine-Westphalia)
- Meerane (Saxony)
- Meerbusch (North Rhine-Westphalia)
- Meersburg (Baden-Württemberg)
- Meinerzhagen (North Rhine-Westphalia)
- Meiningen (Thuringia)
- Meisenheim (Rhineland-Palatinate)
- Meissen (Saxony)
- Meldorf (Schleswig-Holstein)
- Melle (Lower Saxony)
- Mellrichstadt (Bavaria)
- Melsungen (Hesse)
- Memmingen (Bavaria)
- Menden (Sauerland) (North Rhine-Westphalia)
- Mendig (Rhineland-Palatinate)
- Mengen (Baden-Württemberg)
- Meppen (Lower Saxony)
- Merkendorf (Bavaria)
- Merseburg (Saxony-Anhalt)
- Merzig (Saarland)
- Meschede (North Rhine-Westphalia)
- Meßkirch (Baden-Württemberg)
- Meßstetten (Baden-Württemberg)
- Mettmann (North Rhine-Westphalia)
- Metzingen (Baden-Württemberg)
- Meuselwitz (Thuringia)
- Meyenburg (Brandenburg)
- Michelstadt (Hesse)
- Miesbach (Bavaria)
- Miltenberg (Bavaria)
- Mindelheim (Bavaria)
- Minden (North Rhine-Westphalia)
- Mirow (Mecklenburg-Western Pomerania)
- Mittenwalde (Brandenburg)
- Mitterteich (Bavaria)
- Mittweida (Saxony)
- Möckern (Saxony-Anhalt)
- Möckmühl (Baden-Württemberg)
- Moers (North Rhine-Westphalia)
- Mölln (Schleswig-Holstein)
- Mönchengladbach (North Rhine-Westphalia)
- Monheim am Rhein (North Rhine-Westphalia)
- Monheim (Bavaria)
- Monschau (North Rhine-Westphalia)
- Montabaur (Rhineland-Palatinate)
- Moosburg (Bavaria)
- Mörfelden-Walldorf (Hesse)
- Moringen (Lower Saxony)
- Mosbach (Baden-Württemberg)
- Mössingen (Baden-Württemberg)
- Mücheln (Geiseltal) (Saxony-Anhalt)
- Mügeln (Saxony)
- Mühlacker (Baden-Württemberg)
- Mühlberg (Elbe) (Brandenburg)
- Mühldorf (Bavaria)
- Mühlhausen (Thuringia)
- Mühlheim am Main (Hesse)
- Mühlheim an der Donau (Baden-Württemberg)
- Mülheim an der Ruhr (North Rhine-Westphalia)
- Mülheim-Kärlich (Rhineland-Palatinate)
- Müllheim (Baden-Württemberg)
- Müllrose (Brandenburg)
- Münchberg (Bavaria)
- Müncheberg (Brandenburg)
- Münchenbernsdorf (Thuringia)
- Munderkingen (Baden-Württemberg)
- Munich (Bavaria)
- Münnerstadt (Bavaria)
- Münsingen (Baden-Württemberg)
- Munster (Lower Saxony)
- Münster (North Rhine-Westphalia)
- Münstermaifeld (Rhineland-Palatinate)
- Münzenberg (Hesse)
- Murrhardt (Baden-Württemberg)

== N ==
- Nabburg (Bavaria)
- Nagold (Baden-Württemberg)
- Naila (Bavaria)
- Nassau (Rhineland-Palatinate)
- Nastätten (Rhineland-Palatinate)
- Nauen (Brandenburg)
- Naumburg (Hesse) (Hesse)
- Naumburg (Saxony-Anhalt)
- Naunhof (Saxony)
- Nebra (Saxony-Anhalt)
- Neckarbischofsheim (Baden-Württemberg)
- Neckargemünd (Baden-Württemberg)
- Neckarsteinach (Hesse)
- Neckarsulm (Baden-Württemberg)
- Neresheim (Baden-Württemberg)
- Netphen (North Rhine-Westphalia)
- Nettetal (North Rhine-Westphalia)
- Netzschkau (Saxony)
- Neu-Anspach (Hesse)
- Neubrandenburg (Mecklenburg-Western Pomerania)
- Neubukow (Mecklenburg-Western Pomerania)
- Neubulach (Baden-Württemberg)
- Neuburg an der Donau (Bavaria)
- Neudenau (Baden-Württemberg)
- Neuenbürg (Baden-Württemberg)
- Neuenburg am Rhein (Baden-Württemberg)
- Neuenhaus (Lower Saxony)
- Neuenrade (North Rhine-Westphalia)
- Neuenstadt am Kocher (Baden-Württemberg)
- Neuenstein (Baden-Württemberg)
- Neuerburg (Rhineland-Palatinate)
- Neuffen (Baden-Württemberg)
- Neuhaus am Rennweg (Thuringia)
- Neu-Isenburg (Hesse)
- Neukalen (Mecklenburg-Western Pomerania)
- Neukirchen (Hesse)
- Neukirchen-Vluyn (North Rhine-Westphalia)
- Neukloster (Mecklenburg-Western Pomerania)
- Neumark (Thuringia)
- Neumarkt in der Oberpfalz (Bavaria)
- Neumarkt-Sankt Veit (Bavaria)
- Neumünster (Schleswig-Holstein)
- Neunburg vorm Wald (Bavaria)
- Neunkirchen (Saarland)
- Neuötting (Bavaria)
- Neuruppin (Brandenburg)
- Neusalza-Spremberg (Saxony)
- Neusäß (Bavaria)
- Neuss (North Rhine-Westphalia)
- Neustadt an der Aisch (Bavaria)
- Neustadt an der Donau (Bavaria)
- Neustadt an der Waldnaab (Bavaria)
- Neustadt am Kulm (Bavaria)
- Neustadt am Rübenberge (Lower Saxony)
- Neustadt an der Orla (Thuringia)
- Neustadt an der Weinstraße (Rhineland-Palatinate)
- Neustadt bei Coburg (Bavaria)
- Neustadt (Dosse) (Brandenburg)
- Neustadt-Glewe (Mecklenburg-Western Pomerania)
- Neustadt (Hesse) (Hesse)
- Neustadt in Holstein (Schleswig-Holstein)
- Neustadt in Sachsen (Saxony)
- Neustrelitz (Mecklenburg-Western Pomerania)
- Neutraubling (Bavaria)
- Neu-Ulm (Bavaria)
- Neuwied (Rhineland-Palatinate)
- Nidda (Hesse)
- Niddatal (Hesse)
- Nidderau (Hesse)
- Nideggen (North Rhine-Westphalia)
- Niebüll (Schleswig-Holstein)
- Niedenstein (Hesse)
- Niederkassel (North Rhine-Westphalia)
- Niedernhall (Baden-Württemberg)
- Nieder-Olm (Rhineland-Palatinate)
- Niederstetten (Baden-Württemberg)
- Niederstotzingen (Baden-Württemberg)
- Nieheim (North Rhine-Westphalia)
- Niemegk (Brandenburg)
- Nienburg (Saale) (Saxony-Anhalt)
- Nienburg (Lower Saxony)
- Nierstein (Rhineland-Palatinate)
- Niesky (Saxony)
- Nittenau (Bavaria)
- Norden (Lower Saxony)
- Nordenham (Lower Saxony)
- Norderney (Lower Saxony)
- Norderstedt (Schleswig-Holstein)
- Nordhausen (Thuringia)
- Nordhorn (Lower Saxony)
- Nördlingen (Bavaria)
- Northeim (Lower Saxony)
- Nortorf (Schleswig-Holstein)
- Nossen (Saxony)
- Nottertal-Heilinger Höhen (Thuringia)
- Nuremberg (Bavaria)
- Nürtingen (Baden-Württemberg)

== O ==
- Oberasbach (Bavaria)
- Oberderdingen (Baden-Württemberg)
- Oberharz am Brocken (Saxony-Anhalt)
- Oberhausen (North Rhine-Westphalia)
- Oberhof (Thuringia)
- Oberkirch (Baden-Württemberg)
- Oberkochen (Baden-Württemberg)
- Oberlungwitz (Saxony)
- Obermoschel (Rhineland-Palatinate)
- Obernburg am Main (Bavaria)
- Oberndorf am Neckar (Baden-Württemberg)
- Obernkirchen (Lower Saxony)
- Ober-Ramstadt (Hesse)
- Oberriexingen (Baden-Württemberg)
- Obertshausen (Hesse)
- Oberursel (Taunus) (Hesse)
- Oberviechtach (Bavaria)
- Oberwesel (Rhineland-Palatinate)
- Oberwiesenthal, Kurort (Saxony)
- Oberzent (Hesse)
- Ochsenfurt (Bavaria)
- Ochsenhausen (Baden-Württemberg)
- Ochtrup (North Rhine-Westphalia)
- Oderberg (Brandenburg)
- Oebisfelde-Weferlingen (Saxony-Anhalt)
- Oederan (Saxony)
- Oelde (North Rhine-Westphalia)
- Oelsnitz (Saxony)
- Oelsnitz/Erzgeb. (Saxony)
- Oer-Erkenschwick (North Rhine-Westphalia)
- Oerlinghausen (North Rhine-Westphalia)
- Oestrich-Winkel (Hesse)
- Oettingen in Bayern (Bavaria)
- Offenbach am Main (Hesse)
- Offenburg (Baden-Württemberg)
- Ohrdruf (Thuringia)
- Öhringen (Baden-Württemberg)
- Olbernhau (Saxony)
- Olching (Bavaria)
- Oldenburg (Lower Saxony)
- Oldenburg in Holstein (Schleswig-Holstein)
- Olfen (North Rhine-Westphalia)
- Olpe (North Rhine-Westphalia)
- Olsberg (North Rhine-Westphalia)
- Oppenau (Baden-Württemberg)
- Oppenheim (Rhineland-Palatinate)
- Oranienbaum-Wörlitz (Saxony-Anhalt)
- Oranienburg (Brandenburg)
- Orlamünde (Thuringia)
- Ornbau (Bavaria)
- Ortenberg (Hesse)
- Ortrand (Brandenburg)
- Oschatz (Saxony)
- Oschersleben (Bode) (Saxony-Anhalt)
- Osnabrück (Lower Saxony)
- Osterburg (Altmark) (Saxony-Anhalt)
- Osterburken (Baden-Württemberg)
- Osterfeld (Saxony-Anhalt)
- Osterhofen (Bavaria)
- Osterholz-Scharmbeck (Lower Saxony)
- Osterode am Harz (Lower Saxony)
- Osterwieck (Saxony-Anhalt)
- Ostfildern (Baden-Württemberg)
- Ostheim vor der Rhön (Bavaria)
- Osthofen (Rhineland-Palatinate)
- Östringen (Baden-Württemberg)
- Ostritz (Saxony)
- Otterberg (Rhineland-Palatinate)
- Otterndorf (Lower Saxony)
- Ottweiler (Saarland)
- Overath (North Rhine-Westphalia)
- Owen (Baden-Württemberg)

== P ==
- Paderborn (North Rhine-Westphalia)
- Papenburg (Lower Saxony)
- Pappenheim (Bavaria)
- Parchim (Mecklenburg-Western Pomerania)
- Parsberg (Bavaria)
- Pasewalk (Mecklenburg-Western Pomerania)
- Passau (Bavaria)
- Pattensen (Lower Saxony)
- Pausa-Mühltroff (Saxony)
- Pegau (Saxony)
- Pegnitz (Bavaria)
- Peine (Lower Saxony)
- Peitz (Brandenburg)
- Penig (Saxony)
- Penkun (Mecklenburg-Western Pomerania)
- Penzberg (Bavaria)
- Penzlin (Mecklenburg-Western Pomerania)
- Perleberg (Brandenburg)
- Petershagen (North Rhine-Westphalia)
- Pfaffenhofen an der Ilm (Bavaria)
- Pfarrkirchen (Bavaria)
- Pforzheim (Baden-Württemberg)
- Pfreimd (Bavaria)
- Pfullendorf (Baden-Württemberg)
- Pfullingen (Baden-Württemberg)
- Pfungstadt (Hesse)
- Philippsburg (Baden-Württemberg)
- Pinneberg (Schleswig-Holstein)
- Pirmasens (Rhineland-Palatinate)
- Pirna (Saxony)
- Plattling (Bavaria)
- Plau am See (Mecklenburg-Western Pomerania)
- Plaue (Thuringia)
- Plauen (Saxony)
- Plettenberg (North Rhine-Westphalia)
- Pleystein (Bavaria)
- Plochingen (Baden-Württemberg)
- Plön (Schleswig-Holstein)
- Pockau-Lengefeld (Saxony)
- Pocking (Bavaria)
- Pohlheim (Hesse)
- Polch (Rhineland-Palatinate)
- Porta Westfalica (North Rhine-Westphalia)
- Pößneck (Thuringia)
- Potsdam (Brandenburg)
- Pottenstein (Bavaria)
- Preetz (Schleswig-Holstein)
- Premnitz (Brandenburg)
- Prenzlau (Brandenburg)
- Pressath (Bavaria)
- Preußisch Oldendorf (North Rhine-Westphalia)
- Prichsenstadt (Bavaria)
- Pritzwalk (Brandenburg)
- Prüm (Rhineland-Palatinate)
- Puchheim (Bavaria)
- Pulheim (North Rhine-Westphalia)
- Pulsnitz (Saxony)
- Putbus (Mecklenburg-Western Pomerania)
- Putlitz (Brandenburg)
- Püttlingen (Saarland)

== Q ==
- Quakenbrück (Lower Saxony)
- Quedlinburg (Saxony-Anhalt)
- Querfurt (Saxony-Anhalt)
- Quickborn (Schleswig-Holstein)

== R ==
- Rabenau (Saxony)
- Radeberg (Saxony)
- Radebeul (Saxony)
- Radeburg (Saxony)
- Radevormwald (North Rhine-Westphalia)
- Radolfzell am Bodensee (Baden-Württemberg)
- Raguhn-Jeßnitz (Saxony-Anhalt)
- Rahden (North Rhine-Westphalia)
- Rain (Bavaria)
- Ramstein-Miesenbach (Rhineland-Palatinate)
- Ranis (Thuringia)
- Ransbach-Baumbach (Rhineland-Palatinate)
- Rastatt (Baden-Württemberg)
- Rastenberg (Thuringia)
- Rathenow (Brandenburg)
- Ratingen (North Rhine-Westphalia)
- Ratzeburg (Schleswig-Holstein)
- Rauenberg (Baden-Württemberg)
- Raunheim (Hesse)
- Rauschenberg (Hesse)
- Ravensburg (Baden-Württemberg)
- Ravenstein (Baden-Württemberg)
- Recklinghausen (North Rhine-Westphalia)
- Rees (North Rhine-Westphalia)
- Regen (Bavaria)
- Regensburg (Bavaria)
- Regis-Breitingen (Saxony)
- Rehau (Bavaria)
- Rehburg-Loccum (Lower Saxony)
- Rehna (Mecklenburg-Western Pomerania)
- Reichelsheim (Wetterau) (Hesse)
- Reichenbach (Vogtland) (Saxony)
- Reichenbach (Oberlausitz) (Saxony)
- Reinbek (Schleswig-Holstein)
- Reinfeld, Holstein (Schleswig-Holstein)
- Reinheim (Hesse)
- Remagen (Rhineland-Palatinate)
- Remscheid (North Rhine-Westphalia)
- Remseck am Neckar (Baden-Württemberg)
- Renchen (Baden-Württemberg)
- Rendsburg (Schleswig-Holstein)
- Rennerod (Rhineland-Palatinate)
- Renningen (Baden-Württemberg)
- Rerik (Mecklenburg-Western Pomerania)
- Rethem (Lower Saxony)
- Reutlingen (Baden-Württemberg)
- Rheda-Wiedenbrück (North Rhine-Westphalia)
- Rhede (North Rhine-Westphalia)
- Rheinau (Baden-Württemberg)
- Rheinbach (North Rhine-Westphalia)
- Rheinberg (North Rhine-Westphalia)
- Rheinböllen (Rhineland-Palatinate)
- Rheine (North Rhine-Westphalia)
- Rheinfelden (Baden-Württemberg)
- Rheinsberg (Brandenburg)
- Rheinstetten (Baden-Württemberg)
- Rhens (Rhineland-Palatinate)
- Rhinow (Brandenburg)
- Ribnitz-Damgarten (Mecklenburg-Western Pomerania)
- Richtenberg (Mecklenburg-Western Pomerania)
- Riedenburg (Bavaria)
- Riedlingen (Baden-Württemberg)
- Riedstadt (Hesse)
- Rieneck (Bavaria)
- Riesa (Saxony)
- Rietberg (North Rhine-Westphalia)
- Rinteln (Lower Saxony)
- Röbel/Müritz (Mecklenburg-Western Pomerania)
- Rochlitz (Saxony)
- Rockenhausen (Rhineland-Palatinate)
- Rodalben (Rhineland-Palatinate)
- Rodenberg (Lower Saxony)
- Rödental (Bavaria)
- Rödermark (Hesse)
- Rodewisch (Saxony)
- Rodgau (Hesse)
- Roding (Bavaria)
- Römhild (Thuringia)
- Romrod (Hesse)
- Ronneburg (Thuringia)
- Ronnenberg (Lower Saxony)
- Rosbach vor der Höhe (Hesse)
- Rosenfeld (Baden-Württemberg)
- Rosenheim (Bavaria)
- Rosenthal (Hesse)
- Rösrath (North Rhine-Westphalia)
- Roßleben-Wiehe (Thuringia)
- Roßwein (Saxony)
- Rostock (Mecklenburg-Western Pomerania)
- Rotenburg an der Fulda (Hesse)
- Rotenburg an der Wümme (Lower Saxony)
- Roth (Bavaria)
- Rötha (Saxony)
- Röthenbach an der Pegnitz (Bavaria)
- Rothenburg (Saxony)
- Rothenburg ob der Tauber (Bavaria)
- Rothenfels (Bavaria)
- Rottenburg am Neckar (Baden-Württemberg)
- Rottenburg a.d.Laaber (Bavaria)
- Röttingen (Bavaria)
- Rottweil (Baden-Württemberg)
- Rötz (Bavaria)
- Rüdesheim (Hesse)
- Rudolstadt (Thuringia)
- Ruhla (Thuringia)
- Ruhland (Brandenburg)
- Runkel (Hesse)
- Rüsselsheim (Hesse)
- Rutesheim (Baden-Württemberg)
- Rüthen (North Rhine-Westphalia)

== S ==
- Saalburg-Ebersdorf (Thuringia)
- Saalfeld (Thuringia)
- Saarbrücken (Saarland)
- Saarburg (Rhineland-Palatinate)
- Saarlouis (Saarland)
- Sachsenhagen (Lower Saxony)
- Sachsenheim (Baden-Württemberg)
- Salzgitter (Lower Saxony)
- Salzkotten (North Rhine-Westphalia)
- Salzwedel (Saxony-Anhalt)
- Sandau (Elbe) (Saxony-Anhalt)
- Sandersdorf-Brehna (Saxony-Anhalt)
- Sangerhausen (Saxony-Anhalt)
- Sankt Augustin (North Rhine-Westphalia)
- Sankt Goar (Rhineland-Palatinate)
- Sankt Goarshausen (Rhineland-Palatinate)
- Sarstedt (Lower Saxony)
- Sassenberg (North Rhine-Westphalia)
- Sassnitz (Mecklenburg-Western Pomerania)
- Sayda (Saxony)
- Schalkau (Thuringia)
- Schauenstein (Bavaria)
- Scheer (Baden-Württemberg)
- Scheibenberg (Saxony)
- Scheinfeld (Bavaria)
- Schelklingen (Baden-Württemberg)
- Schenefeld (Schleswig-Holstein)
- Scheßlitz (Bavaria)
- Schieder-Schwalenberg (North Rhine-Westphalia)
- Schifferstadt (Rhineland-Palatinate)
- Schillingsfürst (Bavaria)
- Schiltach (Baden-Württemberg)
- Schirgiswalde-Kirschau (Saxony)
- Schkeuditz (Saxony)
- Schkölen (Thuringia)
- Schleiden (North Rhine-Westphalia)
- Schleiz (Thuringia)
- Schleswig (Schleswig-Holstein)
- Schlettau (Saxony)
- Schleusingen (Thuringia)
- Schlieben (Brandenburg)
- Schlitz (Hesse)
- Schloß Holte-Stukenbrock (North Rhine-Westphalia)
- Schlüchtern (Hesse)
- Schlüsselfeld (Bavaria)
- Schmalkalden (Thuringia)
- Schmallenberg (North Rhine-Westphalia)
- Schmölln (Thuringia)
- Schnackenburg (Lower Saxony)
- Schnaittenbach (Bavaria)
- Schneeberg (Saxony)
- Schneverdingen (Lower Saxony)
- Schömberg (Baden-Württemberg)
- Schönau (Baden-Württemberg)
- Schönau im Schwarzwald (Baden-Württemberg)
- Schönberg (Mecklenburg-Western Pomerania)
- Schönebeck (Saxony-Anhalt)
- Schöneck/Vogtl. (Saxony)
- Schönewalde (Brandenburg)
- Schongau (Bavaria)
- Schöningen (Lower Saxony)
- Schönsee (Bavaria)
- Schönwald (Bavaria)
- Schopfheim (Baden-Württemberg)
- Schöppenstedt (Lower Saxony)
- Schorndorf (Baden-Württemberg)
- Schortens (Lower Saxony)
- Schotten (Hesse)
- Schramberg (Baden-Württemberg)
- Schraplau (Saxony-Anhalt)
- Schriesheim (Baden-Württemberg)
- Schrobenhausen (Bavaria)
- Schrozberg (Baden-Württemberg)
- Schüttorf (Lower Saxony)
- Schwaan (Mecklenburg-Western Pomerania)
- Schwabach (Bavaria)
- Schwäbisch Gmünd (Baden-Württemberg)
- Schwäbisch Hall (Baden-Württemberg)
- Schwabmünchen (Bavaria)
- Schwaigern (Baden-Württemberg)
- Schwalbach am Taunus (Hesse)
- Schwalmstadt (Hesse)
- Schwandorf (Bavaria)
- Schwanebeck (Saxony-Anhalt)
- Schwarzatal (Thuringia)
- Schwarzenbach am Wald (Bavaria)
- Schwarzenbach an der Saale (Bavaria)
- Schwarzenbek (Schleswig-Holstein)
- Schwarzenberg/Erzgeb. (Saxony)
- Schwarzenborn (Hesse)
- Schwarzheide (Brandenburg)
- Schwedt (Brandenburg)
- Schweich (Rhineland-Palatinate)
- Schweinfurt (Bavaria)
- Schwelm (North Rhine-Westphalia)
- Schwentinental (Schleswig-Holstein)
- Schwerin (Mecklenburg-Western Pomerania)
- Schwerte (North Rhine-Westphalia)
- Schwetzingen (Baden-Württemberg)
- Sebnitz (Saxony)
- Seehausen (Altmark) (Saxony-Anhalt)
- Seeland (Saxony-Anhalt)
- Seelow (Brandenburg)
- Seelze (Lower Saxony)
- Seesen (Lower Saxony)
- Sehnde (Lower Saxony)
- Seifhennersdorf (Saxony)
- Selb (Bavaria)
- Selbitz (Bavaria)
- Seligenstadt (Hesse)
- Selm (North Rhine-Westphalia)
- Selters (Westerwald) (Rhineland-Palatinate)
- Senden (Bavaria)
- Sendenhorst (North Rhine-Westphalia)
- Senftenberg (Brandenburg)
- Seßlach (Bavaria)
- Siegburg (North Rhine-Westphalia)
- Siegen (North Rhine-Westphalia)
- Sigmaringen (Baden-Württemberg)
- Simbach am Inn (Bavaria)
- Simmern (Rhineland-Palatinate)
- Sindelfingen (Baden-Württemberg)
- Singen (Baden-Württemberg)
- Sinsheim (Baden-Württemberg)
- Sinzig (Rhineland-Palatinate)
- Soest (North Rhine-Westphalia)
- Solingen (North Rhine-Westphalia)
- Solms (Hesse)
- Soltau (Lower Saxony)
- Sömmerda (Thuringia)
- Sondershausen (Thuringia)
- Sonneberg (Thuringia)
- Sonnewalde (Brandenburg)
- Sonthofen (Bavaria)
- Sontra (Hesse)
- Spaichingen (Baden-Württemberg)
- Spalt (Bavaria)
- Spangenberg (Hesse)
- Speicher (Rhineland-Palatinate)
- Spenge (North Rhine-Westphalia)
- Speyer (Rhineland-Palatinate)
- Spremberg (Brandenburg)
- Springe (Lower Saxony)
- Sprockhövel (North Rhine-Westphalia)
- Stade (Lower Saxony)
- Stadtallendorf (Hesse)
- Stadtbergen (Bavaria)
- Stadthagen (Lower Saxony)
- Stadtilm (Thuringia)
- Stadtlohn (North Rhine-Westphalia)
- Stadtoldendorf (Lower Saxony)
- Stadtprozelten (Bavaria)
- Stadtroda (Thuringia)
- Stadtsteinach (Bavaria)
- Stadt Wehlen (Saxony)
- Starnberg (Bavaria)
- Staßfurt (Saxony-Anhalt)
- Staufen im Breisgau (Baden-Württemberg)
- Staufenberg (Hesse)
- Stavenhagen, Reuterstadt (Mecklenburg-Western Pomerania)
- St. Blasien (Baden-Württemberg)
- Stein (Bavaria)
- Steinach (Thuringia)
- Steinau an der Straße (Hesse)
- Steinbach-Hallenberg (Thuringia)
- Steinbach (Taunus) (Hesse)
- Steinfurt (North Rhine-Westphalia)
- Steinheim an der Murr (Baden-Württemberg)
- Steinheim (North Rhine-Westphalia)
- Stendal (Saxony-Anhalt)
- Sternberg (Mecklenburg-Western Pomerania)
- St. Ingbert (Saarland)
- St. Georgen im Schwarzwald (Baden-Württemberg)
- Stockach (Baden-Württemberg)
- Stolberg (Rhld.) (North Rhine-Westphalia)
- Stollberg (Saxony)
- Stolpen (Saxony)
- Storkow (Mark) (Brandenburg)
- Stößen (Saxony-Anhalt)
- Straelen (North Rhine-Westphalia)
- Stralsund (Mecklenburg-Western Pomerania)
- Strasburg (Uckermark) (Mecklenburg-Western Pomerania)
- Straubing (Bavaria)
- Strausberg (Brandenburg)
- Strehla (Saxony)
- Stromberg (Rhineland-Palatinate)
- Stühlingen (Baden-Württemberg)
- Stutensee (Baden-Württemberg)
- Stuttgart (Baden-Württemberg)
- St. Wendel (Saarland)
- Südliches Anhalt (Saxony-Anhalt)
- Suhl (Thuringia)
- Sulingen (Lower Saxony)
- Sulz am Neckar (Baden-Württemberg)
- Sulzbach/ Saar (Saarland)
- Sulzbach-Rosenberg (Bavaria)
- Sulzburg (Baden-Württemberg)
- Sundern (North Rhine-Westphalia)
- Süßen (Baden-Württemberg)
- Syke (Lower Saxony)

== T ==
- Tambach-Dietharz (Thuringia)
- Tamm (Baden-Württemberg)
- Tangerhütte (Saxony-Anhalt)
- Tangermünde (Saxony-Anhalt)
- Tann (Rhön) (Hesse)
- Tanna (Thuringia)
- Tauberbischofsheim (Baden-Württemberg)
- Taucha (Saxony)
- Taunusstein (Hesse)
- Tecklenburg (North Rhine-Westphalia)
- Tegernsee (Bavaria)
- Telgte (North Rhine-Westphalia)
- Teltow (Brandenburg)
- Templin (Brandenburg)
- Tengen (Baden-Württemberg)
- Tessin (Mecklenburg-Western Pomerania)
- Teterow (Mecklenburg-Western Pomerania)
- Tettnang (Baden-Württemberg)
- Teublitz (Bavaria)
- Teuchern (Saxony-Anhalt)
- Teupitz (Brandenburg)
- Teuschnitz (Bavaria)
- Thale (Saxony-Anhalt)
- Thalheim/Erzgeb. (Saxony)
- Thannhausen (Bavaria)
- Tharandt (Saxony)
- Themar (Thuringia)
- Thum (Saxony)
- Tirschenreuth (Bavaria)
- Titisee-Neustadt (Baden-Württemberg)
- Tittmoning (Bavaria)
- Todtnau (Baden-Württemberg)
- Töging am Inn (Bavaria)
- Tönisvorst (North Rhine-Westphalia)
- Tönning (Schleswig-Holstein)
- Torgau (Saxony)
- Torgelow (Mecklenburg-Western Pomerania)
- Tornesch (Schleswig-Holstein)
- Traben-Trarbach (Rhineland-Palatinate)
- Traunreut (Bavaria)
- Traunstein (Bavaria)
- Trebbin (Brandenburg)
- Trebsen/Mulde (Saxony)
- Treffurt (Thuringia)
- Trendelburg (Hesse)
- Treuchtlingen (Bavaria)
- Treuen (Saxony)
- Treuenbrietzen (Brandenburg)
- Triberg im Schwarzwald (Baden-Württemberg)
- Tribsees (Mecklenburg-Western Pomerania)
- Trier (Rhineland-Palatinate)
- Triptis (Thuringia)
- Trochtelfingen (Baden-Württemberg)
- Troisdorf (North Rhine-Westphalia)
- Trossingen (Baden-Württemberg)
- Trostberg (Bavaria)
- Tübingen (Baden-Württemberg)
- Tuttlingen (Baden-Württemberg)
- Twistringen (Lower Saxony)

== U ==
- Übach-Palenberg (North Rhine-Westphalia)
- Überlingen (Baden-Württemberg)
- Uebigau-Wahrenbrück (Brandenburg)
- Ueckermünde (Mecklenburg-Western Pomerania)
- Uelzen (Lower Saxony)
- Uetersen (Schleswig-Holstein)
- Uffenheim (Bavaria)
- Uhingen (Baden-Württemberg)
- Ulm (Baden-Württemberg)
- Ulmen (Rhineland-Palatinate)
- Ulrichstein (Hesse)
- Ummerstadt (Thuringia)
- Unkel (Rhineland-Palatinate)
- Unna (North Rhine-Westphalia)
- Unterschleißheim (Bavaria)
- Usedom (Mecklenburg-Western Pomerania)
- Usingen (Hesse)
- Uslar (Lower Saxony)

== V ==
- Vacha (Thuringia)
- Vaihingen an der Enz (Baden-Württemberg)
- Vallendar (Rhineland-Palatinate)
- Varel (Lower Saxony)
- Vechta (Lower Saxony)
- Velbert (North Rhine-Westphalia)
- Velburg (Bavaria)
- Velden (Bavaria)
- Velen (North Rhine-Westphalia)
- Vellberg (Baden-Württemberg)
- Vellmar (Hesse)
- Velten (Brandenburg)
- Verden (Lower Saxony)
- Veringenstadt (Baden-Württemberg)
- Verl (North Rhine-Westphalia)
- Versmold (North Rhine-Westphalia)
- Vetschau/Spreewald (Brandenburg)
- Viechtach (Bavaria)
- Viernheim (Hesse)
- Viersen (North Rhine-Westphalia)
- Villingen-Schwenningen (Baden-Württemberg)
- Vilsbiburg (Bavaria)
- Vilseck (Bavaria)
- Vilshofen (Bavaria)
- Visselhövede (Lower Saxony)
- Vlotho (North Rhine-Westphalia)
- Voerde (Niederrhein) (North Rhine-Westphalia)
- Vogtsburg im Kaiserstuhl (Baden-Württemberg)
- Vohburg an der Donau (Bavaria)
- Vohenstrauß (Bavaria)
- Vöhrenbach (Baden-Württemberg)
- Vöhringen (Bavaria)
- Volkach (Bavaria)
- Völklingen (Saarland)
- Volkmarsen (Hesse)
- Vreden (North Rhine-Westphalia)

== W ==
- Wachenheim an der Weinstraße (Rhineland-Palatinate)
- Wächtersbach (Hesse)
- Wadern (Saarland)
- Waghäusel (Baden-Württemberg)
- Wahlstedt (Schleswig-Holstein)
- Waiblingen (Baden-Württemberg)
- Waibstadt (Baden-Württemberg)
- Waischenfeld (Bavaria)
- Waldbröl (North Rhine-Westphalia)
- Waldeck (Hesse)
- Waldenbuch (Baden-Württemberg)
- Waldenburg (Saxony)
- Waldenburg (Baden-Württemberg)
- Waldershof (Bavaria)
- Waldheim (Saxony)
- Waldkappel (Hesse)
- Waldkirch (Baden-Württemberg)
- Waldkirchen (Bavaria)
- Waldkraiburg (Bavaria)
- Waldmohr (Rhineland-Palatinate)
- Waldmünchen (Bavaria)
- Waldsassen (Bavaria)
- Waldshut-Tiengen (Baden-Württemberg)
- Walldorf (Baden-Württemberg)
- Walldürn (Baden-Württemberg)
- Wallenfels (Bavaria)
- Walsrode (Lower Saxony)
- Waltershausen (Thuringia)
- Waltrop (North Rhine-Westphalia)
- Wanfried (Hesse)
- Wangen im Allgäu (Baden-Württemberg)
- Wanzleben-Börde (Saxony-Anhalt)
- Warburg (North Rhine-Westphalia)
- Waren (Müritz) (Mecklenburg-Western Pomerania)
- Warendorf (North Rhine-Westphalia)
- Warin (Mecklenburg-Western Pomerania)
- Warstein (North Rhine-Westphalia)
- Wassenberg (North Rhine-Westphalia)
- Wasserburg am Inn (Bavaria)
- Wassertrüdingen (Bavaria)
- Wasungen (Thuringia)
- Wedel (Schleswig-Holstein)
- Weener (Lower Saxony)
- Wegberg (North Rhine-Westphalia)
- Wegeleben (Saxony-Anhalt)
- Wehr (Baden-Württemberg)
- Weida (Thuringia)
- Weiden in der Oberpfalz (Bavaria)
- Weikersheim (Baden-Württemberg)
- Weil am Rhein (Baden-Württemberg)
- Weilburg (Hesse)
- Weil der Stadt (Baden-Württemberg)
- Weilheim an der Teck (Baden-Württemberg)
- Weilheim in Oberbayern (Bavaria)
- Weimar (Thuringia)
- Weingarten (Baden-Württemberg)
- Weinheim (Baden-Württemberg)
- Weinsberg (Baden-Württemberg)
- Weinstadt (Baden-Württemberg)
- Weismain (Bavaria)
- Weißenberg (Saxony)
- Weißenburg in Bayern (Bavaria)
- Weißenfels (Saxony-Anhalt)
- Weißenhorn (Bavaria)
- Weißensee (Thuringia)
- Weißenthurm (Rhineland-Palatinate)
- Weißwasser (Saxony)
- Weiterstadt (Hesse)
- Welzheim (Baden-Württemberg)
- Welzow (Brandenburg)
- Wemding (Bavaria)
- Wendlingen am Neckar (Baden-Württemberg)
- Werben (Elbe) (Saxony-Anhalt)
- Werdau (Saxony)
- Werder (Havel) (Brandenburg)
- Werdohl (North Rhine-Westphalia)
- Werl (North Rhine-Westphalia)
- Werlte (Lower Saxony)
- Wermelskirchen (North Rhine-Westphalia)
- Wernau (Neckar) (Baden-Württemberg)
- Werne (North Rhine-Westphalia)
- Werneuchen (Brandenburg)
- Wernigerode (Saxony-Anhalt)
- Werra-Suhl-Tal (Thuringia)
- Wertheim (Baden-Württemberg)
- Werther (Westf.) (North Rhine-Westphalia)
- Wertingen (Bavaria)
- Wesel (North Rhine-Westphalia)
- Wesenberg (Mecklenburg-Western Pomerania)
- Wesselburen (Schleswig-Holstein)
- Wesseling (North Rhine-Westphalia)
- Westerburg (Rhineland-Palatinate)
- Westerstede (Lower Saxony)
- Wetter (Ruhr) (North Rhine-Westphalia)
- Wetter (Hesse) (Hesse)
- Wettin-Löbejün (Saxony-Anhalt)
- Wetzlar (Hesse)
- Widdern (Baden-Württemberg)
- Wiehl (North Rhine-Westphalia)
- Wiesbaden (Hesse)
- Wiesensteig (Baden-Württemberg)
- Wiesloch (Baden-Württemberg)
- Wiesmoor (Lower Saxony)
- Wildau (Brandenburg)
- Wildberg (Baden-Württemberg)
- Wildenfels (Saxony)
- Wildeshausen (Lower Saxony)
- Wilhelmshaven (Lower Saxony)
- Wilkau-Haßlau (Saxony)
- Willebadessen (North Rhine-Westphalia)
- Willich (North Rhine-Westphalia)
- Wilsdruff (Saxony)
- Wilster (Schleswig-Holstein)
- Wilthen (Saxony)
- Windischeschenbach (Bavaria)
- Windsbach (Bavaria)
- Winnenden (Baden-Württemberg)
- Winsen (Luhe) (Lower Saxony)
- Winterberg (North Rhine-Westphalia)
- Wipperfürth (North Rhine-Westphalia)
- Wirges (Rhineland-Palatinate)
- Wismar (Mecklenburg-Western Pomerania)
- Wissen (Rhineland-Palatinate)
- Witten (North Rhine-Westphalia)
- Wittenberg (Saxony-Anhalt)
- Wittenberge (Brandenburg)
- Wittenburg (Mecklenburg-Western Pomerania)
- Wittichenau (Saxony)
- Wittlich (Rhineland-Palatinate)
- Wittingen (Lower Saxony)
- Wittmund (Lower Saxony)
- Wittstock/Dosse (Brandenburg)
- Witzenhausen (Hesse)
- Woldegk (Mecklenburg-Western Pomerania)
- Wolfach (Baden-Württemberg)
- Wolfenbüttel (Lower Saxony)
- Wolfhagen (Hesse)
- Wolframs-Eschenbach (Bavaria)
- Wolfratshausen (Bavaria)
- Wolfsburg (Lower Saxony)
- Wolfstein (Rhineland-Palatinate)
- Wolgast (Mecklenburg-Western Pomerania)
- Wolkenstein (Saxony)
- Wolmirstedt (Saxony-Anhalt)
- Worms (Rhineland-Palatinate)
- Wörrstadt (Rhineland-Palatinate)
- Wörth am Rhein (Rhineland-Palatinate)
- Wörth an der Donau (Bavaria)
- Wörth am Main (Bavaria)
- Wriezen (Brandenburg)
- Wülfrath (North Rhine-Westphalia)
- Wunsiedel (Bavaria)
- Wunstorf (Lower Saxony)
- Wuppertal (North Rhine-Westphalia)
- Würselen (North Rhine-Westphalia)
- Wurzbach (Thuringia)
- Würzburg (Bavaria)
- Wurzen (Saxony)
- Wustrow (Wendland) (Lower Saxony)
- Wyk auf Föhr (Schleswig-Holstein)

== X ==
- Xanten (North Rhine-Westphalia)

== Z ==
- Zahna-Elster (Saxony-Anhalt)
- Zarrentin am Schaalsee (Mecklenburg-Western Pomerania)
- Zehdenick (Brandenburg)
- Zeil am Main (Bavaria)
- Zeitz (Saxony-Anhalt)
- Zell am Harmersbach (Baden-Württemberg)
- Zell im Wiesental (Baden-Württemberg)
- Zell (Mosel) (Rhineland-Palatinate)
- Zella-Mehlis (Thuringia)
- Zerbst (Saxony-Anhalt)
- Zeulenroda-Triebes (Thuringia)
- Zeven (Lower Saxony)
- Ziegenrück (Thuringia)
- Zierenberg (Hesse)
- Ziesar (Brandenburg)
- Zirndorf (Bavaria)
- Zittau (Saxony)
- Zörbig (Saxony-Anhalt)
- Zossen (Brandenburg)
- Zschopau (Saxony)
- Zülpich (North Rhine-Westphalia)
- Zweibrücken (Rhineland-Palatinate)
- Zwenkau (Saxony)
- Zwickau (Saxony)
- Zwiesel (Bavaria)
- Zwingenberg (Hesse)
- Zwönitz (Saxony)
