= Wohratal =

- Municipality
- Coat of arms

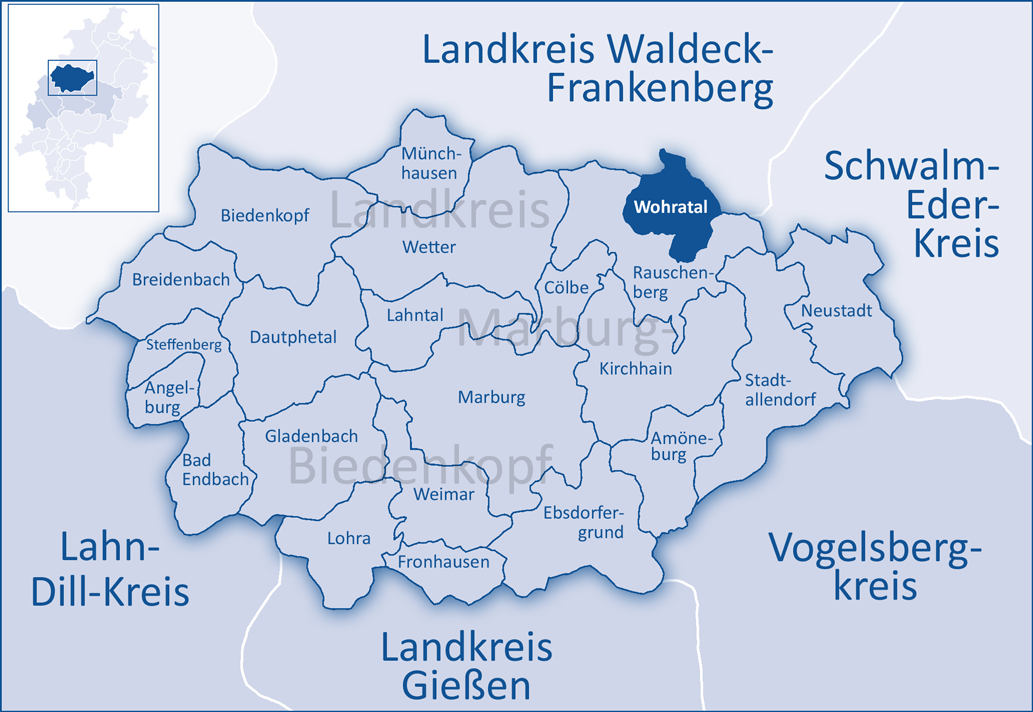
- Location of Wohratal within Marburg-Biedenkopf district
- Interactive map of Wohratal
- Location within Germany Location within Hesse
- Coordinates: 50°56′N 08°56′E
- Country: Germany
- State: Hesse
- Admin. region: Gießen
- District: Marburg-Biedenkopf

Government
  - Mayor (2018–24): Heiko Dawedeit

Area
  - Total: 30.67 km^{2} (11.84 sq mi)
- Elevation: 240 m (790 ft)

Population (2025-12-31)
  - Total: 2,119
  - Density: 69.09/km^{2} (178.9/sq mi)
- Time zone: UTC+01:00 (CET)
  - Summer (DST): UTC+02:00 (CEST)
- Postal codes: 35288
- Dialling codes: 06453 und 06425
- Vehicle registration: MR
- Website: www.wohratal.de

Wohratal (German pronunciation: [ˈvoːʁataːl], lit. 'Wohra Valley') is a municipality in Marburg-Biedenkopf district in Hessen, Germany.

== Geography ==
Wohratal lies between the Kellerwald (forest) in the east and the Burgwald, a low mountain range, in the west, on the river Wohra.

Among the bigger neighbouring centres are the towns of Frankenberg an der Eder to the northwest and Kirchhain to the south.

=== Neighbouring municipalities ===
In the north, Wohratal borders on the towns of Rosenthal and Gemünden, both in Waldeck-Frankenberg district, in the east on the municipality of Gilserberg in Schwalm-Eder district, and on Rauschenberg, also in Marburg-Biedenkopf district, in the south and west.

== Constituent municipalities ==
The municipality consists of four centres: Wohra, Hertingshausen, Halsdorf and Langendorf.

== Politics ==
As of the municipal elections on 14 March 2021, the seats on Wohratal's council are apportioned thus:

- SPD 6 seats
- CDU 4 seats
- Wohratal Open List 5 seats
