= Gemünden (Wohra) =

- Town
- Coat of arms

- Location of Gemünden within Waldeck-Frankenberg district
- Interactive map of Gemünden
- Location within Germany Location within Hesse
- Coordinates: 50°58′N 8°58′E
- Country: Germany
- State: Hesse
- Admin. region: Kassel
- District: Waldeck-Frankenberg
- Subdivisions: 7 Ortsteile bzw. Stadtbezirke

Government
  - Mayor (2020–26): Frank Gleim

Area
  - Total: 58.65 km^{2} (22.64 sq mi)
- Elevation: 249 m (817 ft)

Population (2025-12-31)
  - Total: 3,543
  - Density: 60.41/km^{2} (156.5/sq mi)
- Time zone: UTC+01:00 (CET)
  - Summer (DST): UTC+02:00 (CEST)
- Postal codes: 35285
- Dialling codes: 06453
- Vehicle registration: KB
- Website: www.gemuenden-wohra.de

Gemünden (German pronunciation: [ɡəˈmʏndn̩]) is a town in Waldeck-Frankenberg district in Hesse, Germany.

== Geography ==
=== Location ===
Gemünden lies roughly 22 km northeast of Marburg on the edge of the Burgwald range to the west and near the Kellerwald range rising to the northeast. The river Wohra crosses the town.

=== Neighbouring municipalities ===
Gemünden borders in the north on the municipality of Haina (Waldeck-Frankenberg), in the east on the municipality of Gilserberg (Schwalm-Eder-Kreis), in the south on the municipality of Wohratal (Marburg-Biedenkopf) and in the west on the town of Rosenthal (Waldeck-Frankenberg).

=== Constituent municipalities ===
The town consists of the centres of Ellnrode, Gemünden (Wohra), Grüsen, Herbelhausen, Lehnhausen, Schiffelbach and Sehlen.

=== History ===
Gemünden was formed out of seven villages: Holzbach, Giebelingsbach, Burghardshausen, Ernstdorf, Steigershausen, Osterbach and Katzbach

The town's first documentary mentions come from the years 750 to 780, under the name Zegemunde. The second documentary mention came in 1223. In 1253, Gemünden is first mentioned as a town. At this time, Gemünden belonged to the Counts of Ziegenhain. This historical fact is even seen in the town's coat of arms, showing a black bird in a white field with red claws, a goat's head (Ziege is German for goat) and a six-pointed star under each wing.

In 1450, Gemünden passed to Hesse after the Ziegenhain line had died out.

In the 16th century, the town had great wealth. In 1523, a great fountain was built, in 1541, the school was built, in 1564, a town hall was built on the marketplace, and in 1587, the first aqueduct was built using wooden ducts.

The war years in the 17th and 18th centuries not only destroyed Gemünden's emerging cultural life, but also exacted heavy sacrifices. The Plague claimed two thirds of the town's population. The Thirty Years' War and the Seven Years' War asked the utmost of the townsfolk in terms of billeting and financial performance.

From 1909 to 1914, the railway was built, the aqueduct special purpose association (Wasserleitungszweckverband) was founded (Gemünden got a new, modern water supply) and a new school in Gemünden came into being.

In 1972, passenger transport on the railway was discontinued. In the winter of 1980-1981 came the discontinuation of goods services as well, and furthermore, the tracks were torn up.

=== Jewish history and presence ===
Records of a Jewish municipality in Gemünden date back to 1571. Throughout the centuries, Gemünden had a lively Jewish municipality numbering about 70 persons until their deportation to concentration camps at 1941/1942.

The Synagogue of Gemünden was destroyed and burned in the Crystal Night at 1938 and soon afterwards was demolished.

== Politics ==
=== Town council ===
The town council's 23 seats are apportioned thus, in accordance with municipal elections held on 26 March 2006:

CDU	13 seats
SPD	7 seats
Bürgerliste	3 seats

Note: Bürgerliste is a "citizens' list" rather than an actual party.

Elections in March 2016

- CDU: 9 seats
- SPD: 5 seats
- B.L.:9 seats

=== Coat of arms ===
Gemünden's civic coat of arms might heraldically be described thus: In argent a goat-headed spreadeagle sable armed and langued gules, under each wing a six-pointed star Or.

The goat-headed spreadeagle is a common heraldic charge in civic heraldry in the Ziegenhains' former domain (see also Neukirchen's, Schwalmstadt's and Schwarzenborn's coats of arms; indeed, there is even another place in Hesse called Gemünden with a similar charge in its arms), and was taken from the Counts' arms. In 1261 there appeared a seal showing this composition surmounted by a city gate. This last charge was removed in the 14th century and since then, the town's arms have hardly changed. The stars may symbolize St. Mary's Monastery, another former local ruler in the Middle Ages. The stars have changed position several times over the ages, and the colours have changed – the creature was not always "armed and langued gules" (did not always have red claws and tongue) – but as they stand now, the arms match the oldest known seal.

=== Town partnerships ===
- Elsbethen, Austria
- Illiers-Combray, France

== Sons and Daughters ==
- Konrad Dieterich (1575-1639), Protestant theologian
- Daniel Schleyermacher (1697-1765), Zionite in Wuppertal
- Adam Selbert (1893-1965), official, politician and journalist
- The theologian and Entrepreneur Family Scheibler
