= Rauschenberg, Hesse =

Rauschenberg
- Town
- Coat of arms

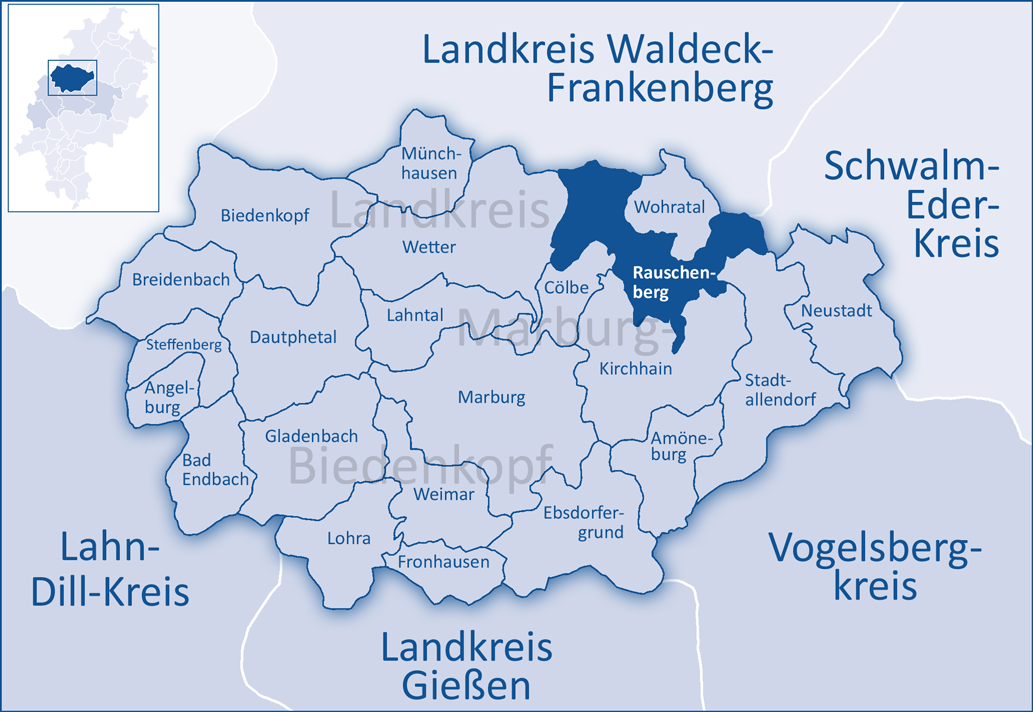
- Location of Rauschenberg within Marburg-Biedenkopf district
- Interactive map of Rauschenberg
- Location within Germany Location within Hesse
- Coordinates: 50°52′N 8°55′E
- Country: Germany
- State: Hesse
- Admin. region: Gießen
- District: Marburg-Biedenkopf
- Subdivisions: 7 Ortsteile

Government
  - Mayor (2018–24): Michael Emmerich (CDU)

Area
  - Total: 67.32 km^{2} (25.99 sq mi)
- Elevation: 227 m (745 ft)

Population (2025-12-31)
  - Total: 4,454
  - Density: 66.16/km^{2} (171.4/sq mi)
- Time zone: UTC+01:00 (CET)
  - Summer (DST): UTC+02:00 (CEST)
- Postal codes: 35282
- Dialling codes: 06425
- Vehicle registration: MR
- Website: www.rauschenberg.de

Rauschenberg (German pronunciation: [ˈʁaʊʃn̩bɛʁk]) is a town in the north of Marburg-Biedenkopf district in Hesse, Germany.

== Geography ==
=== Location ===
Rauschenberg lies at the southern edge of the Burgwald, a low mountain range, near Marburg and Kirchhain.

=== Neighbouring municipalities ===
Rauschenberg borders in the north on the town of Rosenthal (Waldeck-Frankenberg) as well as on the municipalities of Wohratal (Marburg-Biedenkopf) and Gilserberg (Schwalm-Eder-Kreis), in the east on the town of Stadtallendorf, in the south on the town of Kirchhain, in the southwest on the municipality of Cölbe, and in the west on the town of Wetter (all in Marburg-Biedenkopf).

=== Municipality divisions ===
Rauschenberg consists out of following villages:

- Albshausen
- Bracht
- Ernsthausen
- Josbach
- Rauschenberg (town)
- Schwabendorf
- Wolfskaute

== History ==
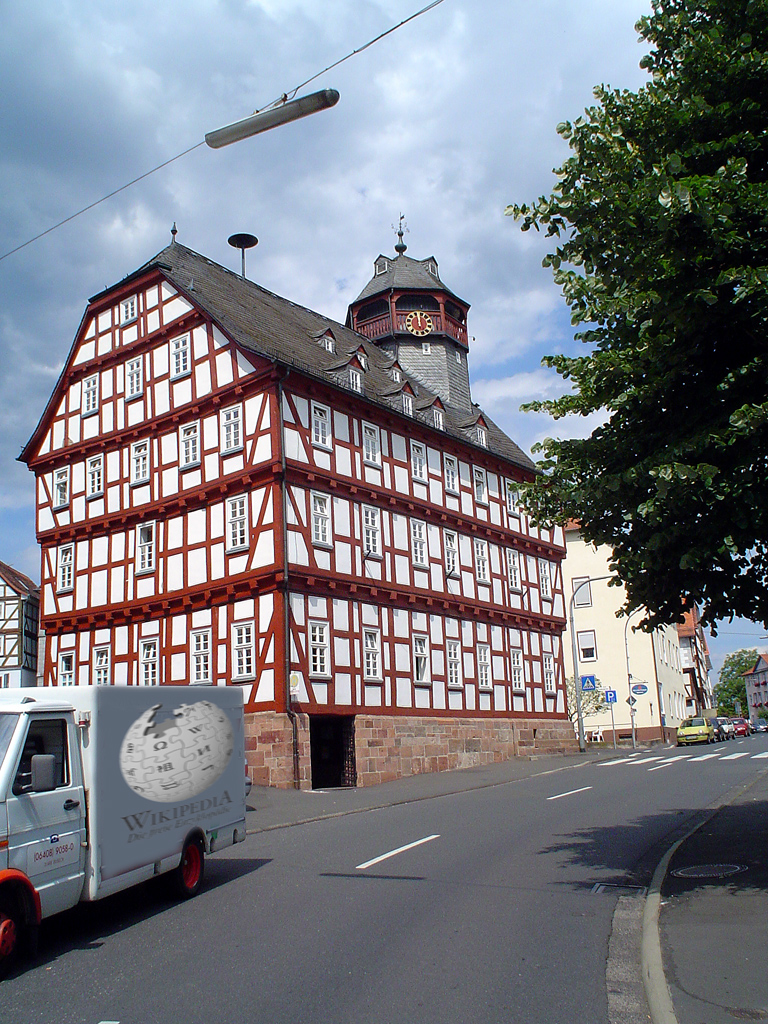
Rauschenberg's town hall

Even as far back as 1000, a castle was built in what is now Rauschenberg. After a fire about 1250, almost the whole settlement was destroyed. Shortly after Rauschenberg was founded by the Counts of Ziegenhain, it was granted town rights. When the "von Ziegenhain" family died out in 1450, the castle and the town fell to the House of Hesse. In this time, the castle was expanded and made into a hunting lodge.

During the Thirty Years' War, Rauschenberg was mostly destroyed and thoroughly plundered by Swedish troops. Ever since the castle was blown up at a Kassel colonel's behest two years before the war ended, there has been nothing left of it but a ruin.

== Politics ==
=== Town council ===
Results of municipal election on 6 March 2016:

Parties and voter coalitions		Share in %	Seats
CDU	Christian Democratic Union	26.1	6
SPD	Social Democratic Party of Germany	23.1	5
Greens	Alliance '90/The Greens	21.1	5
FBL	Freie Bürgerliste (citizens' coalition)	29.7	7
total		100	23

== Coat of arms ==
Rauschenberg's civic coat of arms might be described thus: Party per fess; above, in sable a six-pointed star argent; below in Or. It matches the arms used by the town's old overlords, the Counts of Ziegenhain. An eight-pointed star in a modification of the Counts coat of arms.

== Town partnership ==
- Westende, Belgium.

== Culture and Sightseeing ==
=== Buildings ===
There has not been much left of the castle, later stately home, of Rauschenberg since it was destroyed in the Thirty Years' War. The ruins on the hill over the constituent municipality – also known as Rauschenberg – are open and free to all.

== Economy and infrastructure ==
=== Transport ===
Rauschenberg is connected to the road network by Federal Highway (Bundesstraße) B 3 between Frankfurt and Kassel, and by Bundesstraße B 62. As for public transportation, there is a bus connection to Kirchhain which runs many times daily.

== Personalities ==
=== People born in Rauschenberg ===
- Johannes Hinderbach (1418-1486), Bishop of Trento
- Gustav Simon (1878-1962), administrative official

=== Personalities who have lived or worked in Rauschenberg ===
- Peter Janich (1942-2016), philosopher and co-founder of Methodical Culturalism, died in Rauschenberg

== In pop culture ==
A Finnish industrial music group, named Rauschenmaschine (German for noisemaschine) has a song on their website called Rauschenberg.
