= Rosenthal, Hesse =

Rosenthal
- Town
- Coat of arms

- Location of Rosenthal within Waldeck-Frankenberg district
- Interactive map of Rosenthal
- Location within Germany Location within Hesse
- Coordinates: 50°58′N 08°52′E
- Country: Germany
- State: Hesse
- Admin. region: Kassel
- District: Waldeck-Frankenberg
- Subdivisions: 3 Ortsteile

Government
  - Mayor (2021–27): Stefan Jakob (CDU)

Area
  - Total: 51.55 km^{2} (19.90 sq mi)
- Elevation: 294 m (965 ft)

Population (2025-12-31)
  - Total: 2,017
  - Density: 39.13/km^{2} (101.3/sq mi)
- Time zone: UTC+01:00 (CET)
  - Summer (DST): UTC+02:00 (CEST)
- Postal codes: 35119
- Dialling codes: 06458
- Vehicle registration: KB
- Website: www.rosenthaler.de

Rosenthal (German pronunciation: [ˈʁoːzn̩taːl]) is a small town in southeast Waldeck-Frankenberg district in Hesse, Germany.

== Geography ==
=== Location ===
Rosenthal lies in the Burgwald range 11 km southeast of Frankenberg and 18 km northeast of Marburg.

=== Neighbouring municipalities ===
Rosenthal borders in the north on the municipality of Burgwald, in the east on the town of Gemünden (both in Waldeck-Frankenberg), in the southeast on the municipality of Wohratal, in the south on the towns of Rauschenberg and Wetter, and in the west on the municipality of Münchhausen (all in Marburg-Biedenkopf).

=== Constituent municipalities ===
Besides the main town, which bears the same name as the whole, the town of Rosenthal consists of the centres of Roda and Willershausen.

== History ==
Rosenthal was founded in 1327 as a Mainz town and outpost in the dispute over the Hessian fief, but nevertheless passed to the Landgraviate of Hesse in 1464.

In 1688, the town achieved dubious fame by being the scene of Hesse's last witch burnings.

In 1866, Rosenthal passed, along with the rest of the Electorate of Hesse, to Prussia.

=== Amalgamations ===
As part of Hesse's municipal reforms in the early 1970s, the heretofore independent municipalities of Roda and Willershausen were amalgamated with Rosenthal.

== Politics ==
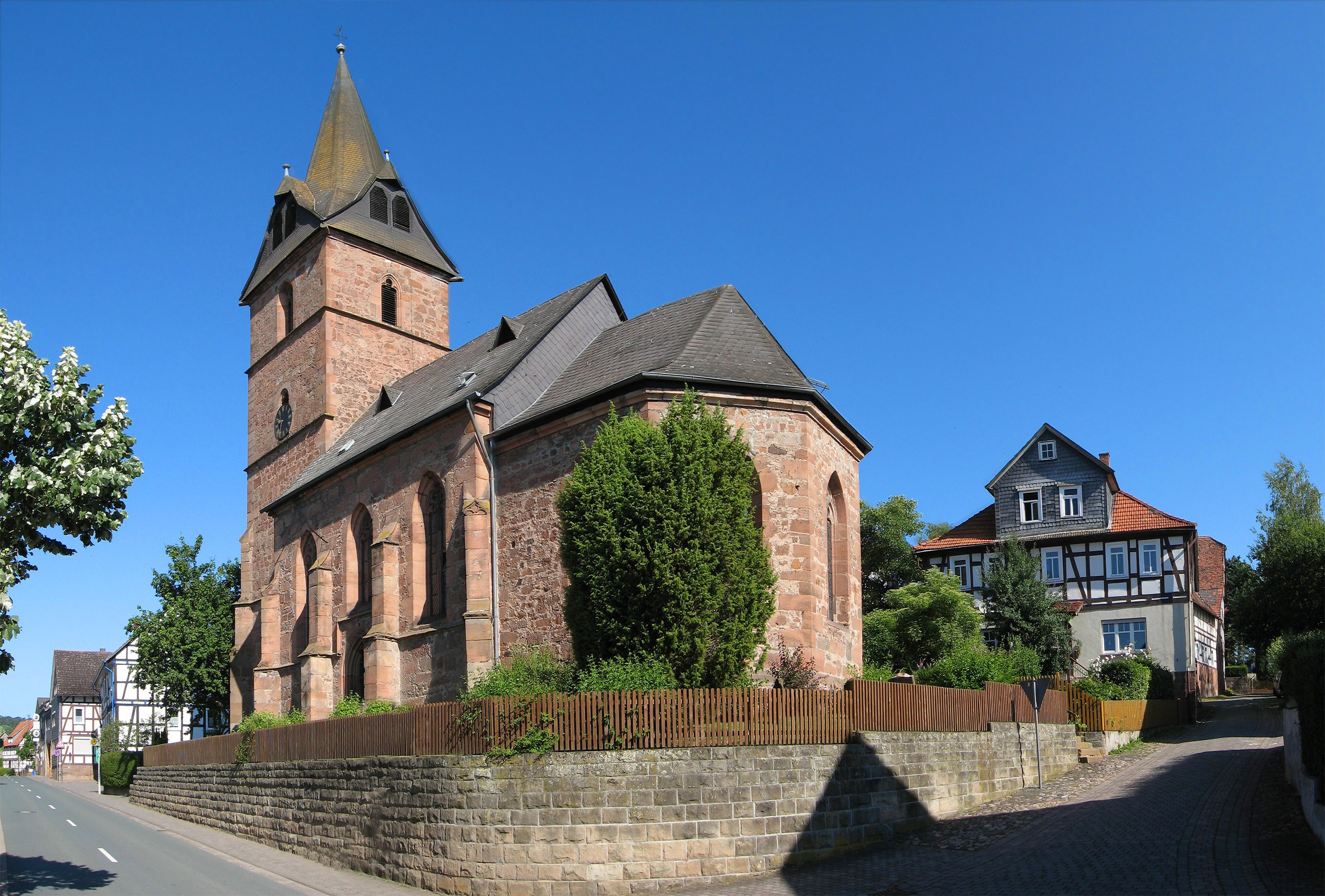
The Church in Rosenthal

=== Town council ===
The town council's 15 seats are apportioned thus, in accordance with municipal elections held on 26 March 2006:

CDU	7 seats
Bürgerliste Roda	5 seats
FDP	3 seats

Note: Bürgerliste Roda is a citizens' coalition.

=== Mayor ===
At the mayoral election on 26 September 2021, Stefan Jakob was elected Rosenthal's mayor with an 82% share of the vote.

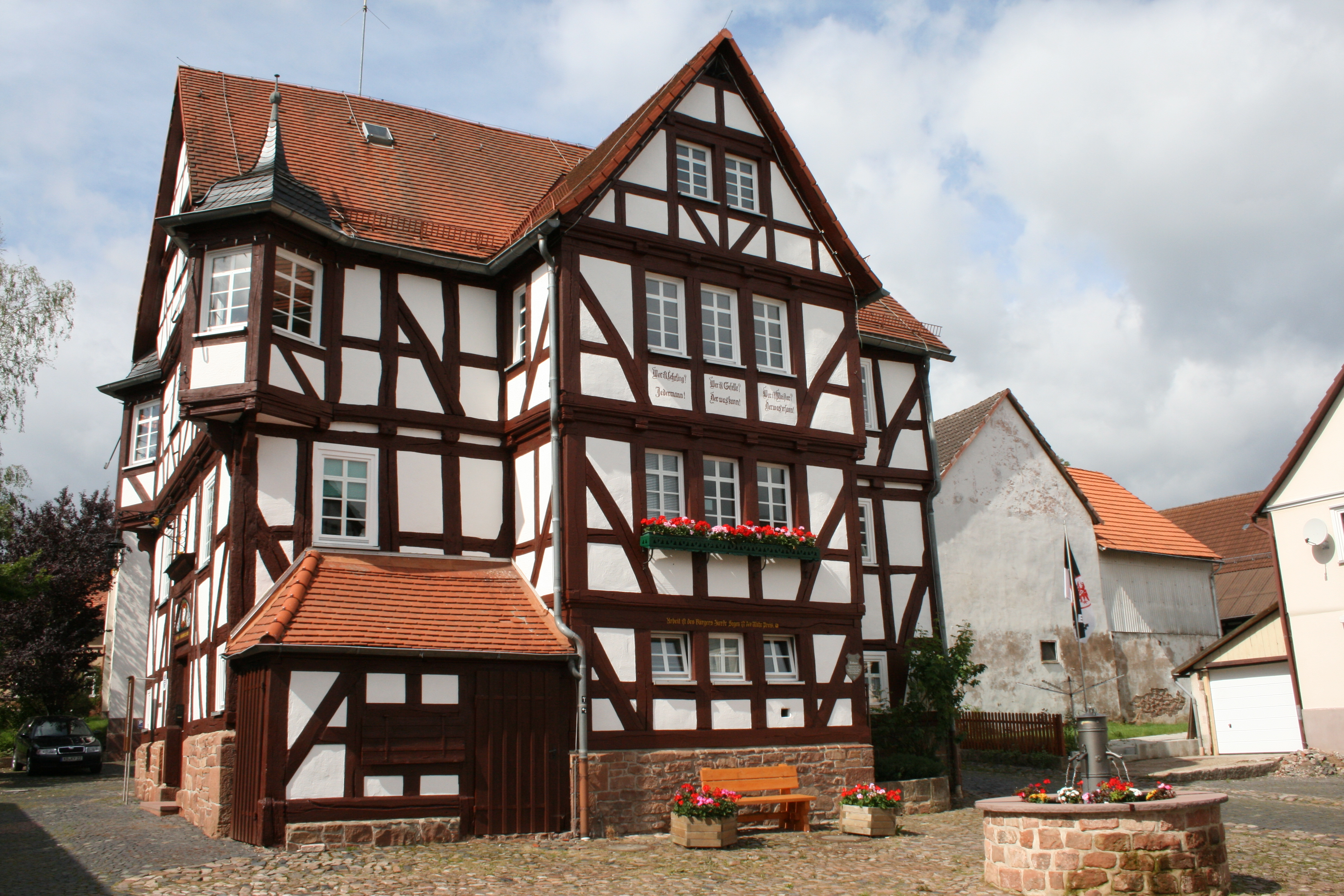
Rathaus from Rosenthal

=== Coat of arms ===
Rosenthal's civic coat of arms might heraldically be described thus: In gules a six-spoked wheel argent surrounded per square by four roses Or with centres azure and sepals vert.

This describes the arms shown in this article, and also seen at the town's official website. At least one source however, describes a different composition with three stemmed roses growing out of the top of the wheel.

The wheel is the Wheel of Mainz, symbolizing the town's founders.

== Literature ==
- Fritz Himmelmann: Heimatbuch der Stadt Rosenthal
