= Wetter, Hesse =

Wetter (Hessen)
- Town
- Coat of arms

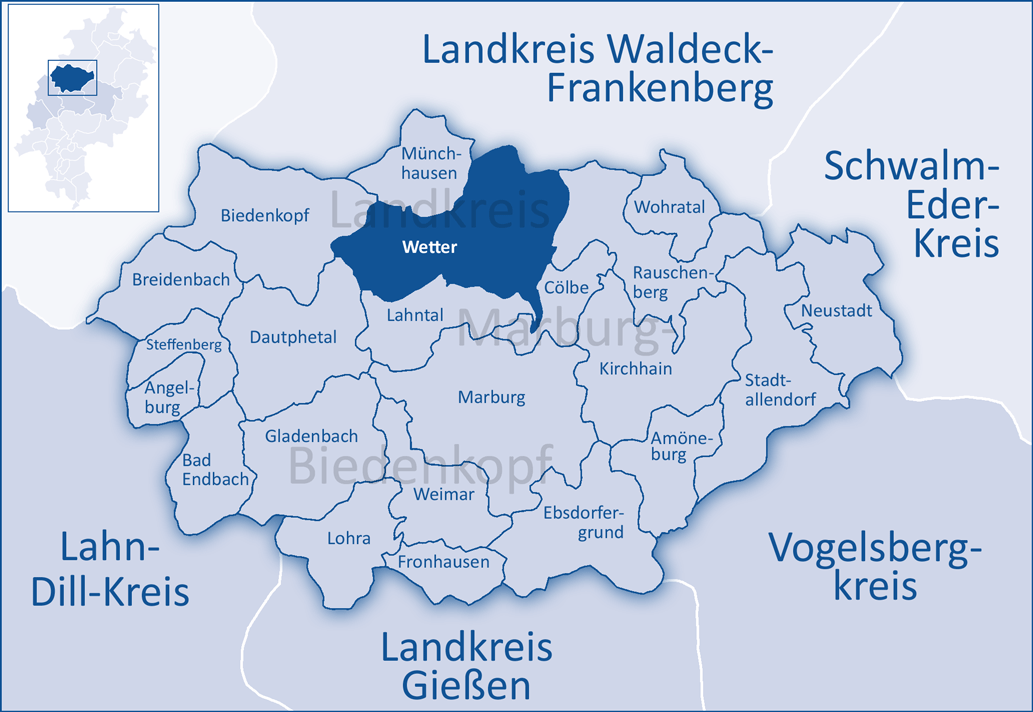
- Location of Wetter (Hessen) within Marburg-Biedenkopf district
- Interactive map of Wetter (Hessen)
- Location within Germany Location within Hesse
- Coordinates: 50°53′N 8°43′E
- Country: Germany
- State: Hesse
- Admin. region: Gießen
- District: Marburg-Biedenkopf
- Subdivisions: 9 Stadtteile

Government
  - Mayor (2024–30): Sven Schmidt-Mankel

Area
  - Total: 104.53 km^{2} (40.36 sq mi)
- Elevation: 220 m (720 ft)

Population (2025-12-31)
  - Total: 8,940
  - Density: 85.5/km^{2} (222/sq mi)
- Time zone: UTC+01:00 (CET)
  - Summer (DST): UTC+02:00 (CEST)
- Postal codes: 35083
- Dialling codes: 06423
- Vehicle registration: MR
- Website: www.wetter-hessen.de

Wetter (Hessen) (German pronunciation: [ˈvɛtɐ]) is a small town in Hesse, Germany. The rather unusual designation Wetter (Hessen-Nassau) stems from a time when the town belonged to the Prussian province of the same name, and nowadays is only used by the railway – even today, the railway station in town bears this name.

== Geography ==
Wetter lies in the Marburg-Biedenkopf district on the western edge of the Burgwald, a low range of hills, in the Wetschaft valley and neighbouring places about 14 km north of Marburg.

=== Neighbouring municipalities ===
To the north, Wetter borders on the town of Rosenthal in Waldeck-Frankenberg district, to the east on the town of Rauschenberg and the municipality of Cölbe, to the south on the municipality of Lahntal, to the southwest on the municipality of Dautphetal, and to the southwest on the town of Biedenkopf and the municipality of Münchhausen am Christenberg, all in the Marburg-Biedenkopf district.

== Transport ==
North to south through the town's municipal area runs the Federal Highway (Bundesstraße) B 252 from eastern Westphalia by way of Korbach and Frankenberg and on to Göttingen (in the municipality of Lahntal). To divert heavy traffic away from places in the Wetschaft valley, a bypass road is planned.

The Burgwaldbahn railway line connects the town with Marburg and Frankenberg. The Kurhessenbahn which runs the line means to reopen the extension between Frankenberg and Korbach.

== History ==
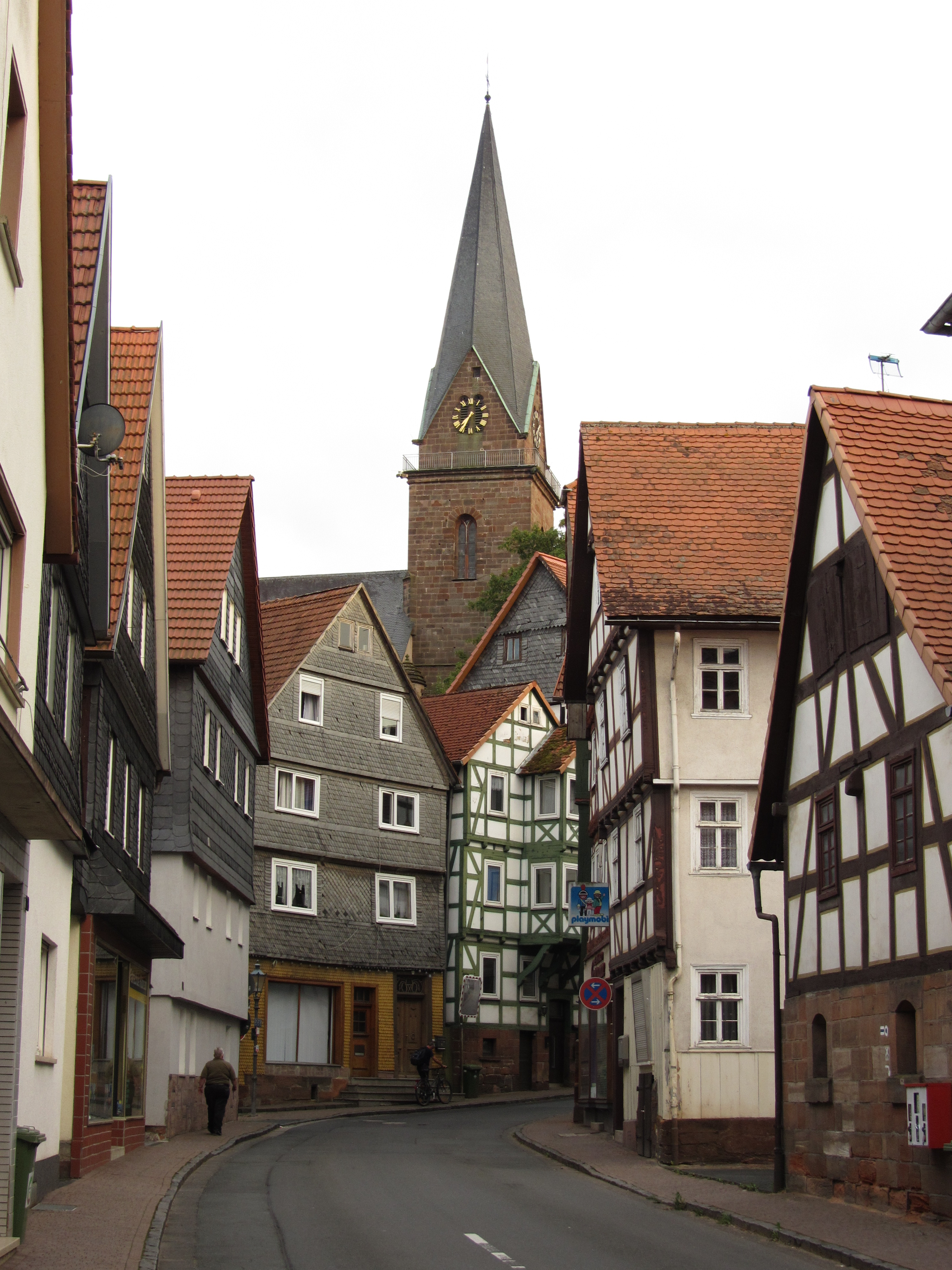
Wetter, old town with church tower

Wetter was already being mentioned in documents in the 8th and 9th centuries; it was mentioned in one such document under the same name that it still has today in 1108, and the "Weistum of Wetter" was already displaying its town rights even as early as 1239.

== Politics ==
=== Town council ===
As of municipal elections held on 26 March 2006, the seats on Wetter Town Council are apportioned thus:

CDU	12 seats
SPD	12 seats
FDP	3 seats
Greens	3 seats
Left Party	1 seat

=== Coat of arms ===
Wetter's civic coat of arms might be described thus: In Or on a three-knolled hill vert a fleur-de-lis twig vert with three blossoms argent flanked by two inescutcheons, dexter in azure the Hessian Lion rampant gules and argent sinister; sinister in gules the wheel of Mainz argent.

The two inescutcheons (smaller shields within the main one) hark back to the time when the Hessian Landgraves held sway (the Hessian Lion), and to the Archbishops of Mainz (the wheel of Mainz).

== Constituent municipalities ==
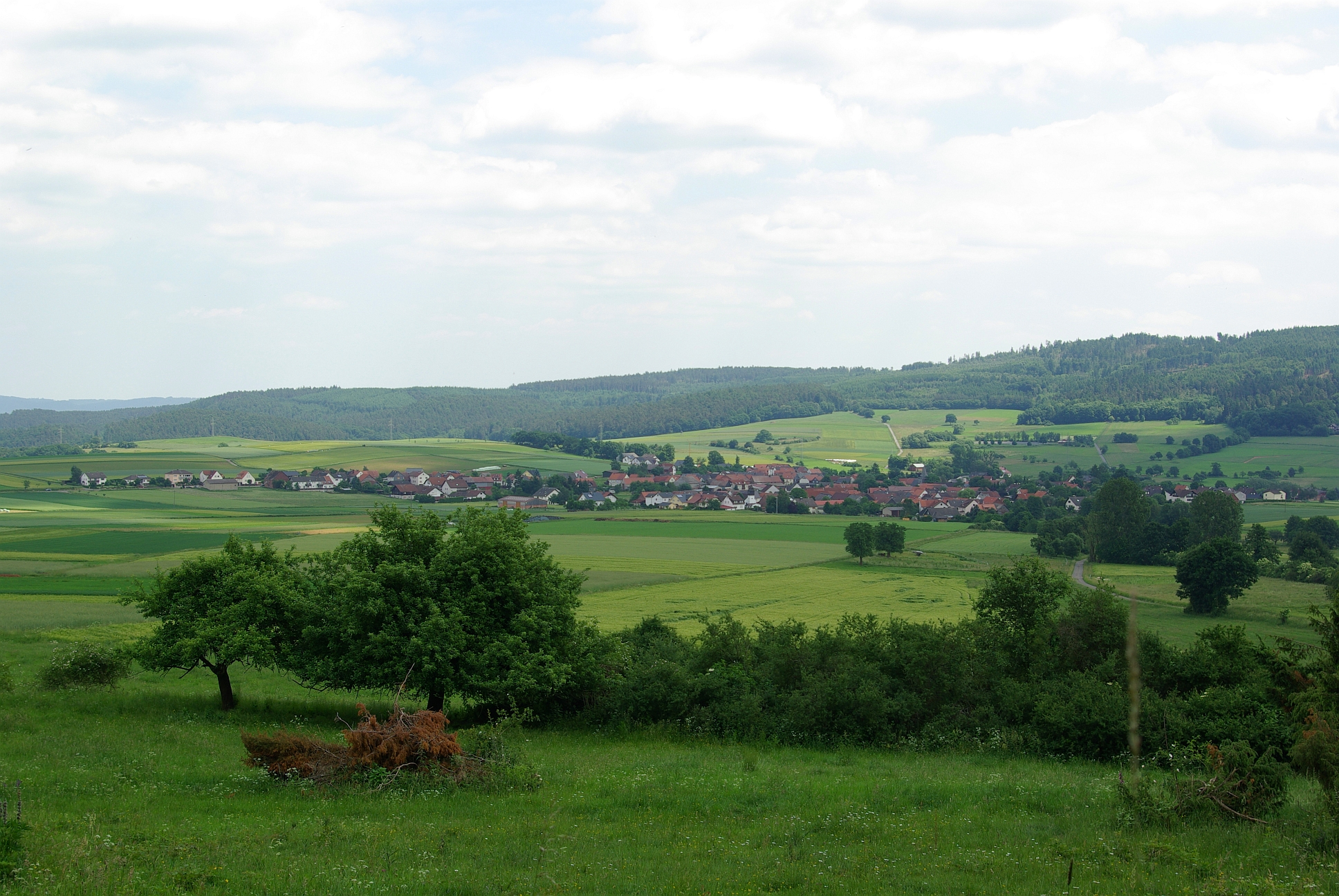
View towards Warzenbach, part of Wetter (Hessen)

- Amönau
- Mellnau
- Niederwetter
- Oberndorf
- Oberrosphe
- Todenhausen
- Treisbach
- Unterrosphe
- Warzenbach
- Wetter

== Culture and sightseeing ==
=== Buildings ===
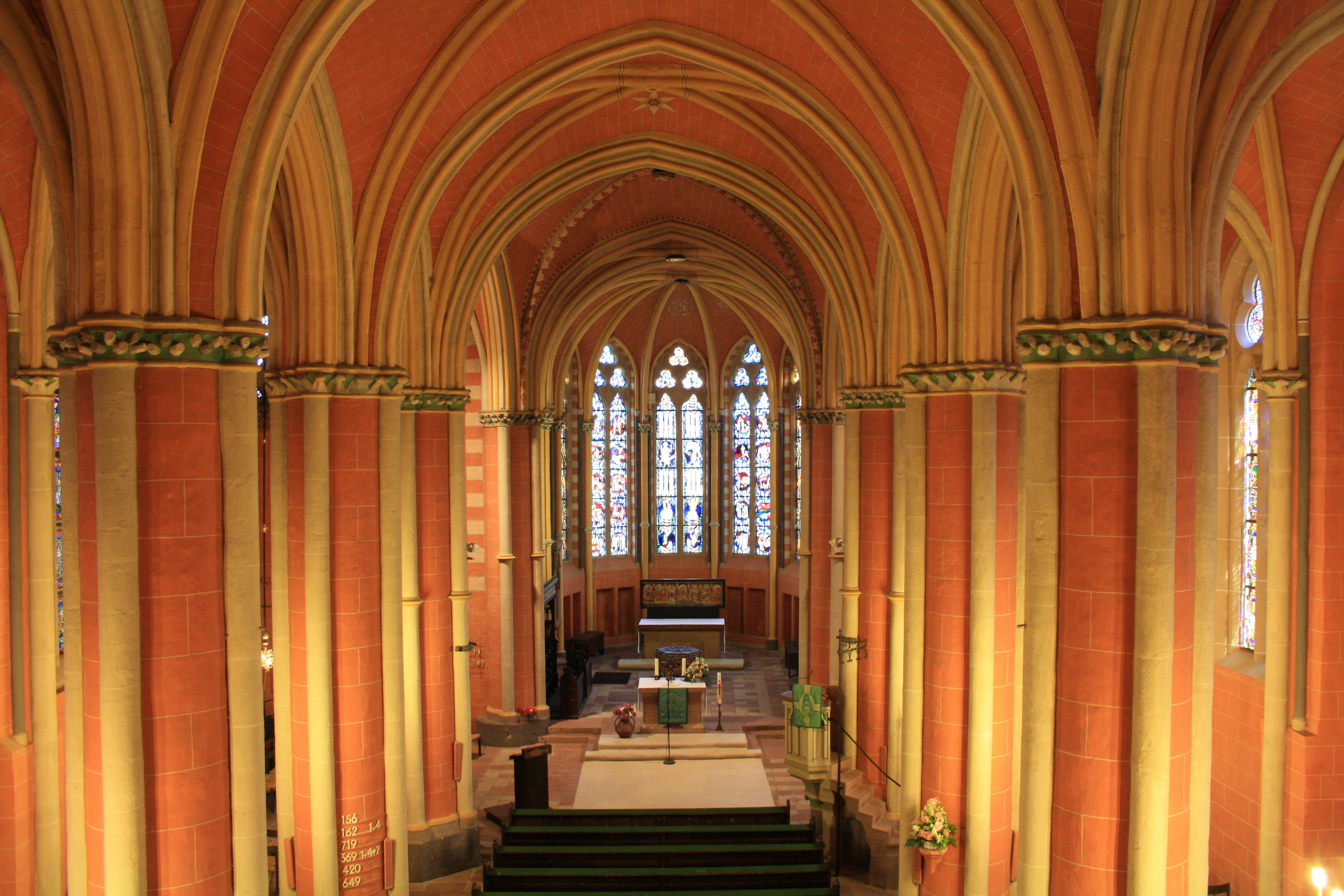
Monastery Church Wetter, interior

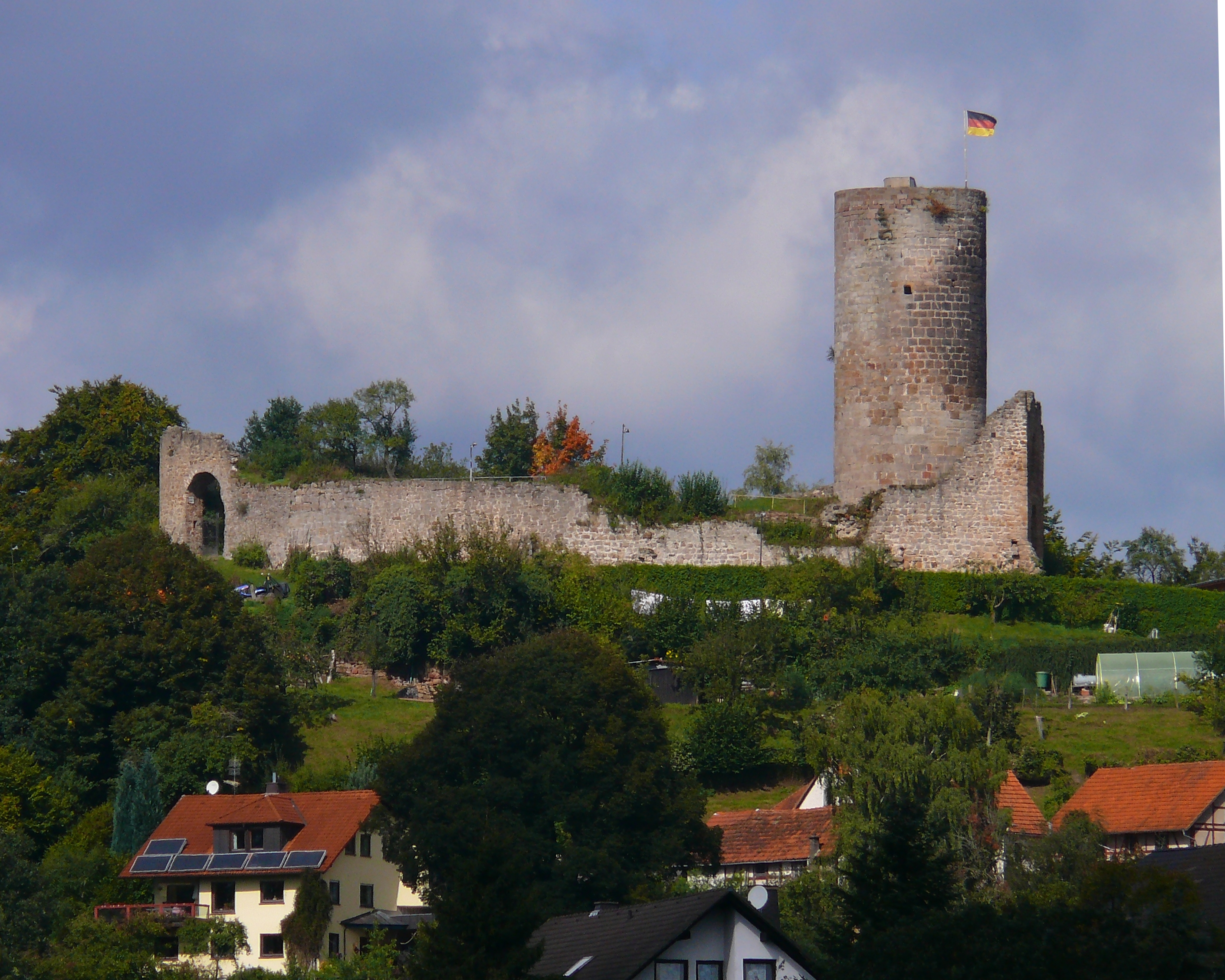
Castle Mellnau, ruin in Wetter-Mellnau

- The Gothic monastery church (13th century).
- Town Hall – in the upper floors slated half-timbering with a spire skylight, built about 1680. The ground floor is massive. Recently expanded.
- Former synagogue – (once a storeroom, since renovated and turned into an event room). Two-floor square half-timbered building with polygonal ridge turret, late 19th century.
- Houses – The compact and picturesque townscape consists first and foremost of half-timbered houses with forward-facing gables, most of which have slate roofs or plasterwork. After several town fires, only a few buildings from before 1629 have still been preserved. Some houses exhibit Classicist doors.
- Remains of the mediaeval town wall with two towers.

The houses at the following addresses are worth mentioning:

- Markt 7 – Three-floor house with forward-facing gable and a corner oriel window. On the stone ground floor a pretty Renaissance portal, marked 1570.
- Markt 8 – 17th century.
- Markt 9 – Three-floor house with forward-facing gable, presumably from the first third of the 16th century, second upper floor added about 1700.
- Markt 14 – Baroque half-timbered building with ornamental carvings, presumably from the late 17th century.
- Krämergasse 14 – House with side gables with carved infilling boards, dated 1671.
- Krämergasse 10 – Two-floor half-timbered building, possibly from first quarter of the 16th century.

=== Regular events ===
Every seven years, the town holds its Grenzgangfest, recalling a time when patrolling the town's boundaries was necessary to prevent neighbourly encroachment. The next Grenzgangfest (in German) is in 2029.

=== Sons and daughters of the town ===
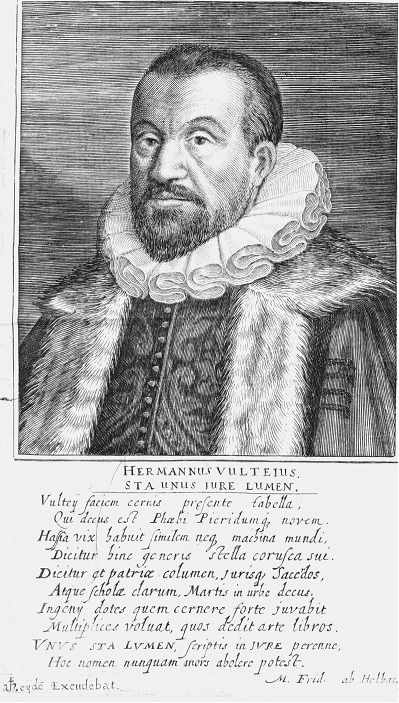
Hermann Vultejus when he was young

- Friedrich Sylburg (1536-1596), publisher
- Johannes Cuchlinus (1546-1606), pastor and founding regent of the theological college at Leiden University
- Hermann Vultejus (1555–1634), German jurist
- Oswald Croll (1560-1608), physician and pharmacist
- Fred Steinfort (born 1952), American Football player

== Partner towns ==
- Deutschkreutz, Austria
- Oostrozebeke, Belgium
- (Germany) Reinsdorf, Saxony-Anhalt

== Population ==
According to the 2022 census in Germany, Wetter had a population of 8,966 people living in it, with the number of males and females being virtually equal. Most residents are between the ages 50 and 59 years. Most are Protestant.
