= Gilserberg =

- Municipality
- Coat of arms

- Location of Gilserberg within Schwalm-Eder-Kreis district
- Interactive map of Gilserberg
- Location within Germany Location within Hesse
- Coordinates: 50°57′N 09°04′E
- Country: Germany
- State: Hesse
- Admin. region: Kassel
- District: Schwalm-Eder-Kreis
- Subdivisions: 10 Ortsteile

Government
  - Mayor (2018–24): Rainer Barth

Area
  - Total: 61.55 km^{2} (23.76 sq mi)
- Elevation: 341 m (1,119 ft)

Population (2025-12-31)
  - Total: 2,834
  - Density: 46.04/km^{2} (119.3/sq mi)
- Time zone: UTC+01:00 (CET)
  - Summer (DST): UTC+02:00 (CEST)
- Postal codes: 34630
- Dialling codes: 06696
- Vehicle registration: HR
- Website: www.gilserberg.de

Gilserberg (pronounced [ˈɡɪlzɐˌbɛʁk]) is a municipality in the Schwalm-Eder district in Hesse, Germany.

== Geography ==
=== Location ===
Gilserberg lies at the foot of the Kellerwald, a low mountain range, nestled in the Kurhessen Highland on Federal Highway (Bundesstraße) B 3, 60 km from Kassel and 30 km from Marburg.

=== Constituent communities ===
Together with the main centre, which also bears the same name as the whole municipality, the ten centres of Appenhain, Heimbach, Itzenhain, Lischeid, Moischeid, Sachsenhausen, Schönau, Schönstein, Sebbeterode and Winterscheid also belong to the community of Gilserberg.

== History ==
Gilserberg had its first documentary mention in 1262.

== Religion ==
=== Jewish community ===
There was a Jewish community in Gilserberg from the 18th century through to sometime after 1933. The Jewish population peaked about 1900 at 70 or more persons. The first synagogue was supposedly built about the beginning of the 19th century. A newer one was festively consecrated on 12 January 1898. However, it was destroyed on Kristallnacht (9 November 1938). At least four of the community's Jewish residents were murdered in Nazi death camps. All that is left nowadays in Gilserberg of the former Jewish community is a small Jewish graveyard.

== Amalgamations ==
As part of Hesse's municipal reforms, the formerly independent communities of Gilserberg, Heimbach, Lischeid, Moischeid, Sachsenhausen, Schönau, Schönstein, Sebbeterode and Winterscheid voluntarily combined to form the community of Gilserberg on 1 January 1972. On 1 April of the same year, the communities of Appenhain and Itzenhain also joined, making the community complete.

== Town partnership ==
- Rocheservière, France.
