= Artern (district) =

Artern (Kreis Artern) was a Kreis (district) in the Bezirk (district) of Halle in the German Democratic Republic (GDR). From 1990 to 1994 it persisted as Landkreis Artern in the state of Thüringen. It occupied land that is for the most part modern Kyffhäuserkreis in Thüringen.

== History ==
In 1952, the GDR undertook comprehensive reform in the division of its districts. Artern was formed out of the remaining part of the Landkreis (rural district) that had existed before the reform and was assigned to the newly formed Bezirk of Halle.

After the reunification of Germany, in 1990 Artern was assigned to the state of Thüringen, which had once again been founded, and through the districting reforms of the reunified Germany was included in Kyffhäuserkreis and in Sömmerda (district).

== Geography ==
Artern, which lay in the Kyffhäuser, is traversed by the Helme and Unstrut. The largest settled areas near the district capital Artern were the cities Bad Frankenhausen, Heldrungen, and Wiehe and the parish of Roßleben. Other neighboring settled areas included the parishes of Bilzingsleben, Borxleben, Bottendorf, Bretleben, Donndorf, Esperstedt. Gehofen, Gorsleben, Hauteroda, Heygendorf, Ichstedt, Kalbsrieth, Kannawurf, Nausitz, Oberheldrungen, Reinsdorf, Ringleben Schönewerda, and Voigtstedt.

== Economy ==
Important firms in the district, among others, included

- VEB Kyffhäuserhütte Artern
- VEB Zuckerfabrik Artern
- VEB Kaliwerk Roßleben
- VEB Plastmaschinenwerk Wiehe
- VEB Brau- und Malzfabrik Sangerhausen, Werk Artern
- VEB Elektro Bad Frankenhausen

== See also ==
- Sondershausen (district)
- Kyffhäuserkreis
