= Hohe Schrecke =

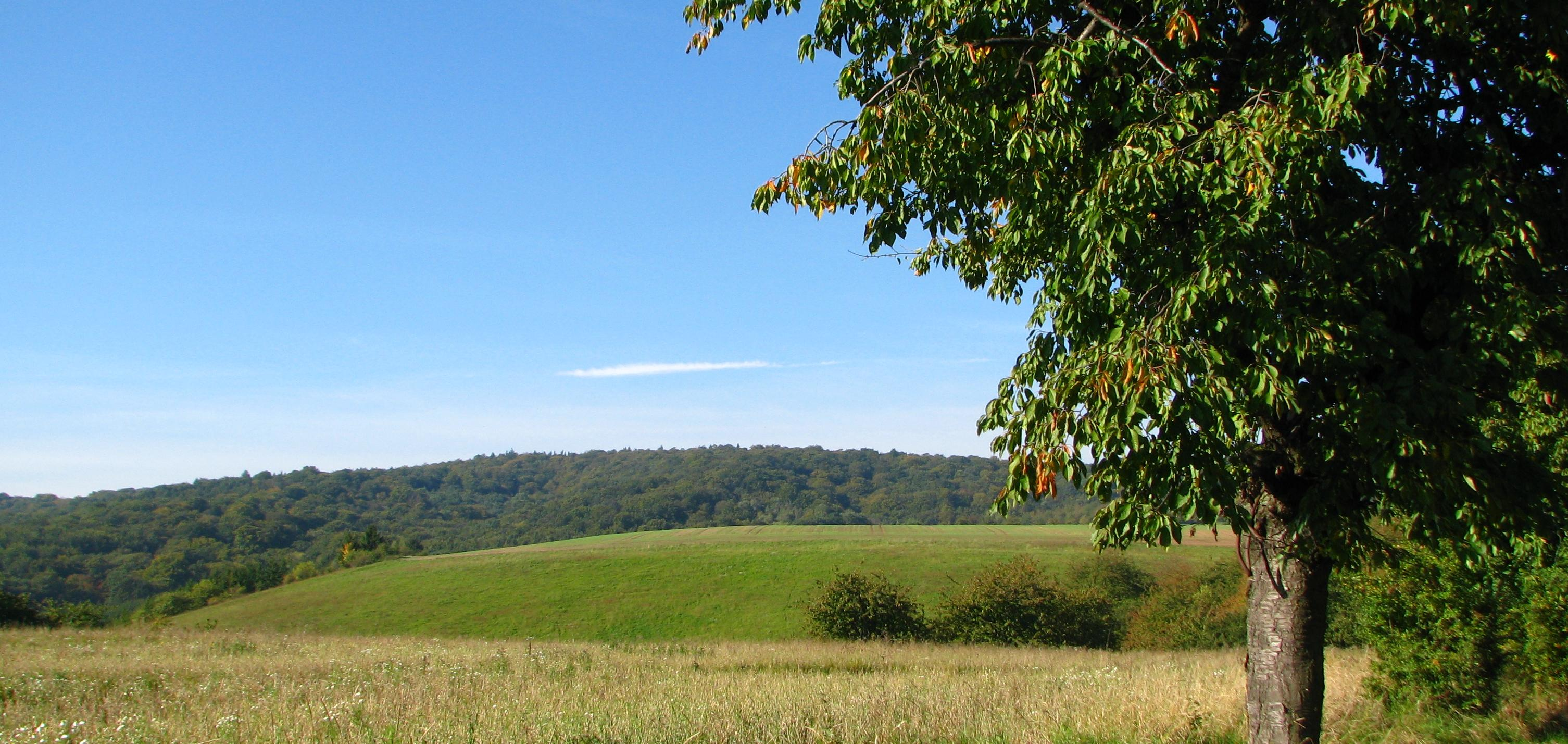

Highest point
- Peak: Wetzelshain
- Elevation: 370.1 m above NHN

Dimensions
- Area: 30–55 km^{2} (12–21 sq mi)(depending on definition)

Geography
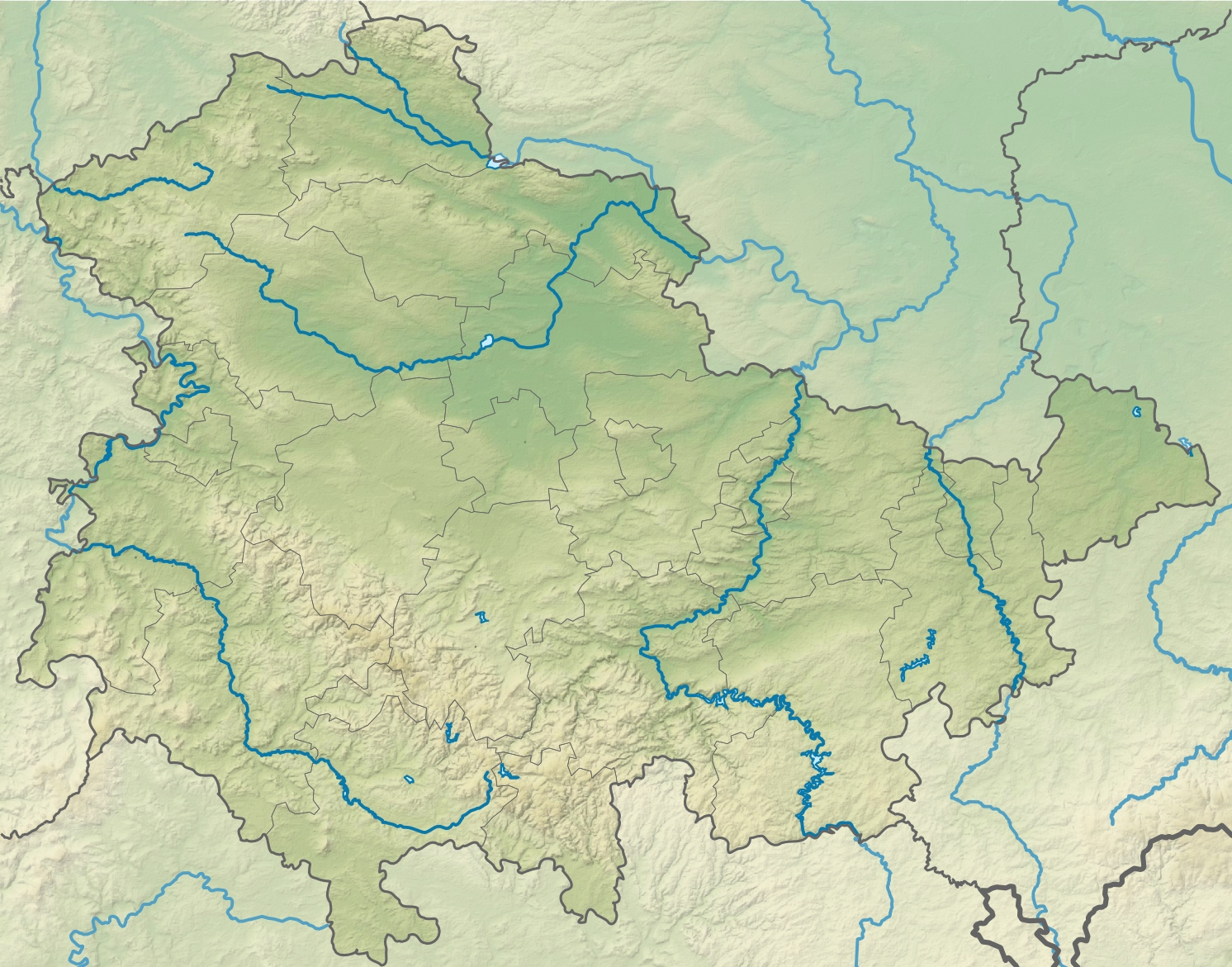
- Location within Thuringia
- State(s): Counties of Kyffhäuser and Sömmerda (Thuringia), Burgenlandkreis (Saxony-Anhalt) (Germany)
- Range coordinates: 51.2583°N 11.3361°E
- Parent range: Lower Unstrut Hill Country, Thuringian Basin (and surrounding plateaux)

Geology
- Rock type: Bunter sandstone

The Hohe Schrecke is a ridge of hills in central Germany. It lies mainly within Thuringia; however, the southeastern part around Lossa belongs to the state of Saxony-Anhalt.

== Geography ==
Together with the Schmücke, the Finne and the Hainleite, the Hohe Schrecke forms the northern rim of the Thuringian Basin. It lies between Braunsroda, Reinsdorf, Gehofen, Donndorf, Wiehe, Lossa, Hauteroda, and Oberheldrungen.

=== Hills and high points ===
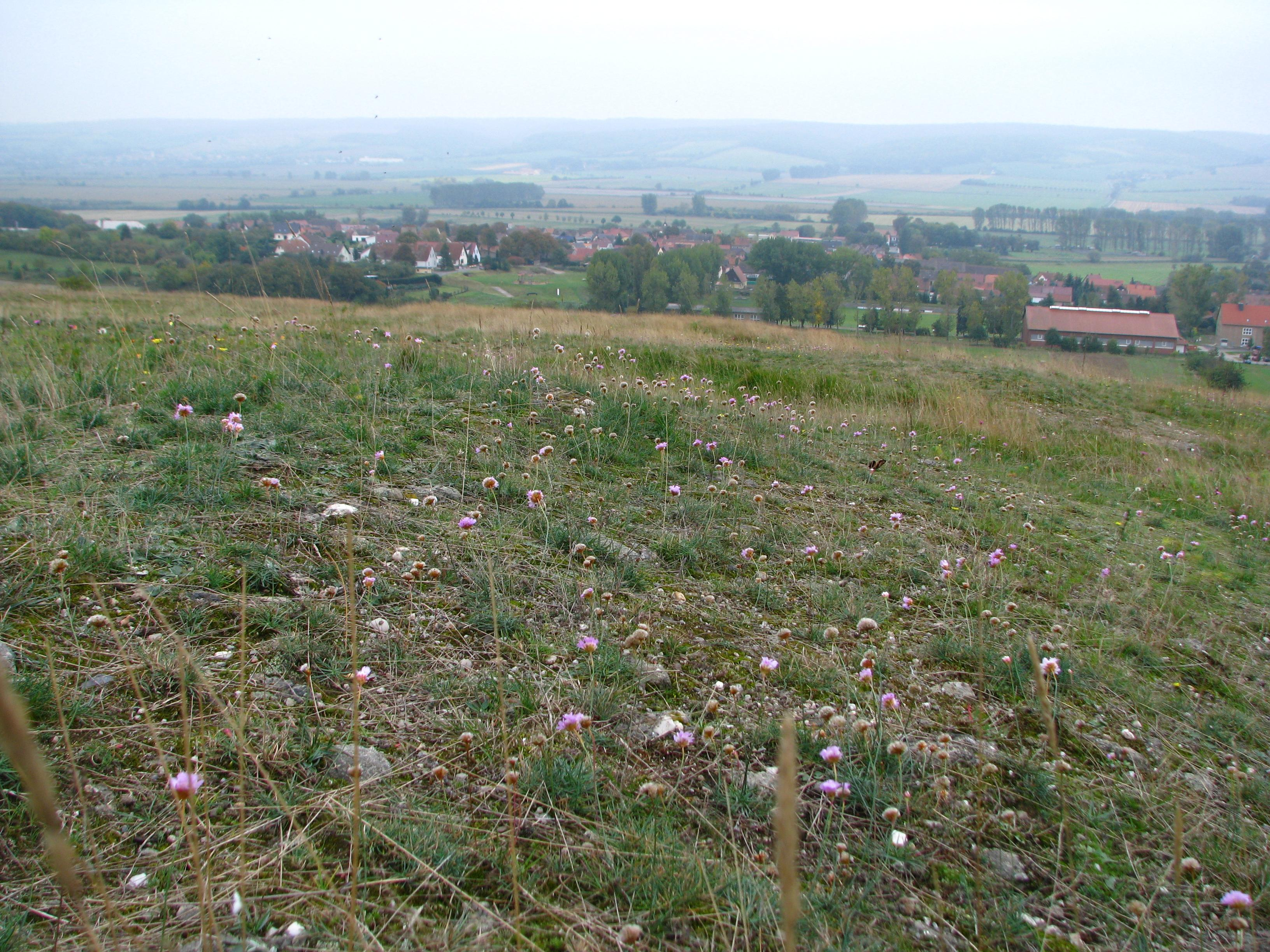
View of the Hohe Schrecke from Bottendorf

The highest point of the Hohe Schrecke in its wider sense is the Wetzelshain (370.1 m). Among its hills and high points are the following– sorted by height in metres (m) above sea level (NHN; unless otherwise stated):

- Wetzelshain (370.1 m), between Hauteroda and Garnbach
- Beerberg (362.7 m), between Hauteroda and Langenroda
- Drei-Lindenberg (357.6 m), near Garnbach
- Seligenbornsberg (356.0 m), near Lossa in the area of the Finne with Saxony-Anhalt
- Erbsland (353.6 m), near Ostramondra in the area of the Finne
- Heidenkopf (353.2 m), between Garnbach and Ostramondra
- Buchberg (348.6 m), near Langenroda
- Bilsenhügel (341.3 m), between Hauteroda and Donndorf
- Mittelberg (337.2 m), near Garnbach
- Eichleite (328.6 m), between Hauteroda and Donndorf
- Schulzenberg (319.6 m), between Gehofen and Oberheldrungen
- Heidelberg (267.6 m), near Braunsroda
- Schlachtberg (237.0 m), near Gehofen
- Kummerberg (231,3 m), near Reinsdorf
- Querberg (195,8 m), near Reinsdorf
- Leidenberg (186,1 m), near Bretleben

See also: List of mountains and hills in Thuringia

== History ==
The Hohe Schrecke belonged to the heartland of the Duchy of Thuringia and had powerful hill forts and fortifications on its perimeter (e.g. the Monraburg). In the High Middle Ages, the area belonged to the Counts of Beichling, the Counts of Wiehe and the Landgraves of Thuringia (Raspenburg). The roads running through the area were controlled by other castles, including Rabenswalde Castle. Economic and land development also led to the establishment of settlements and villages within this hill country, of which the deserted village of Wetzelshain bears witness. For several centuries, the Hohe Schrecke was used extensively by the Werther Forest administration and until its uncompensated expropriation in 1945, the majority of the forest belonged to the Werthern-Beichlingen family. In the 1930s, a munitions facility for the German Luftwaffe was built in the eastern part of the Hoher Schrecke, east of Lossa. Ammunition was stored in above-ground bunkers with earthen embankments. These were blown up in 1945 by the Red Army, who disposed of ammunition supplies in the old potash shafts.

Between 1946 and 1948, the Soviet occupation forces cleared around 2,000 of the 4,900 hectares of forest to create a military training area surrounded by a restricted military zone. In some cases, the forest was allowed to grow back. In the early 1990s, Soviet troops stationed near Lossa withdrew. The LEG in Thuringia were ordered to clear the area of ammunition and to seal rocket shafts and bunkers. 3,000 hectares yet to be safely cleared in 2010. The forest was then to be sold. Around 2005, the decision was made to implement a major nature conservation project called the "Hohe Schrecke - Old Forest with a Future" (see below).

== Flora and fauna ==
The landscape on the Hohe Schrecke is dominated by large, unified stands of deciduous forest, especially beech woods. In the eastern part there are areas that were used as a military training area until the withdrawal of Soviet forces and were kept free of trees for that purpose.

Primarily because of its unity the Hohe Schrecke provides a habitat for the wildcat, black stork and red deer. More than 500 different species of macrofungi also grow here.

== Nature reserve ==
The majority of the Hohe Schrecke has been designated as a nature reserve, which covers an area of some 35 km^{2}.

The nature reserve was notified to the European Commission as part of the Hohe Schrecke - Finne Flora-Fauna Habitat Region. It is coextensive with the Hohe Schrecke - Finne bird reserve.

The conservation project "Hohe Schrecke - Old Forest with a Future" (Hohe Schrecke - Alter Wald mit Zukunft) was one of five winners of the national competition for nature conservation projects and rural development. As a result, it has received resources from the Federal Ministry for Environment, Nature Conservation and Nuclear Safety and the Federal Ministry of Food, Agriculture and Consumer Protection.
