= Schmücke =

Coordinates: 51°14′37″N 11°16′33″E

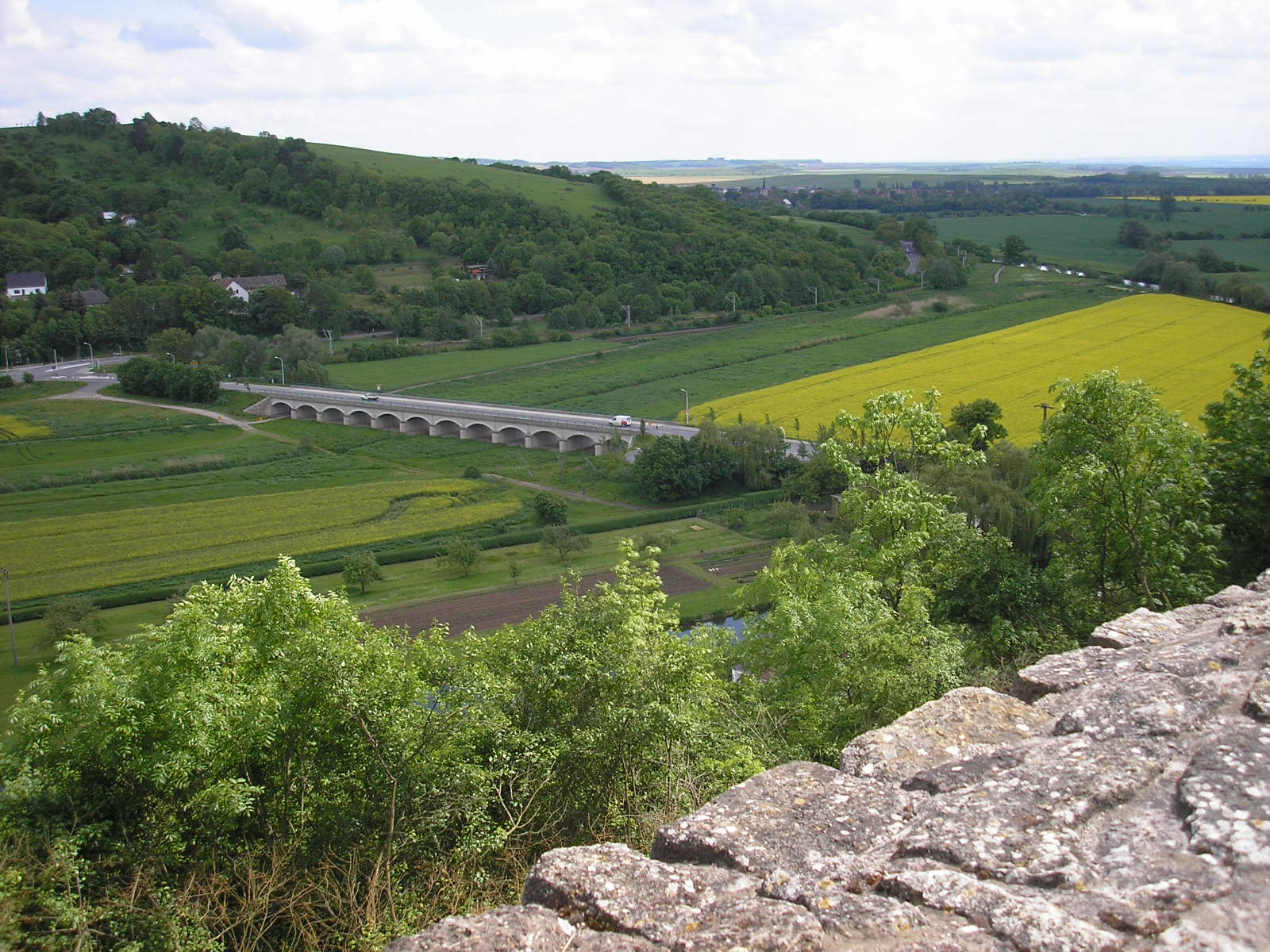
View from the Untere Sachsenburg over the Thuringian Gate to the northwestern end of the Schmücke with the bridge over the Unstrut carrying the B 85 and B 86

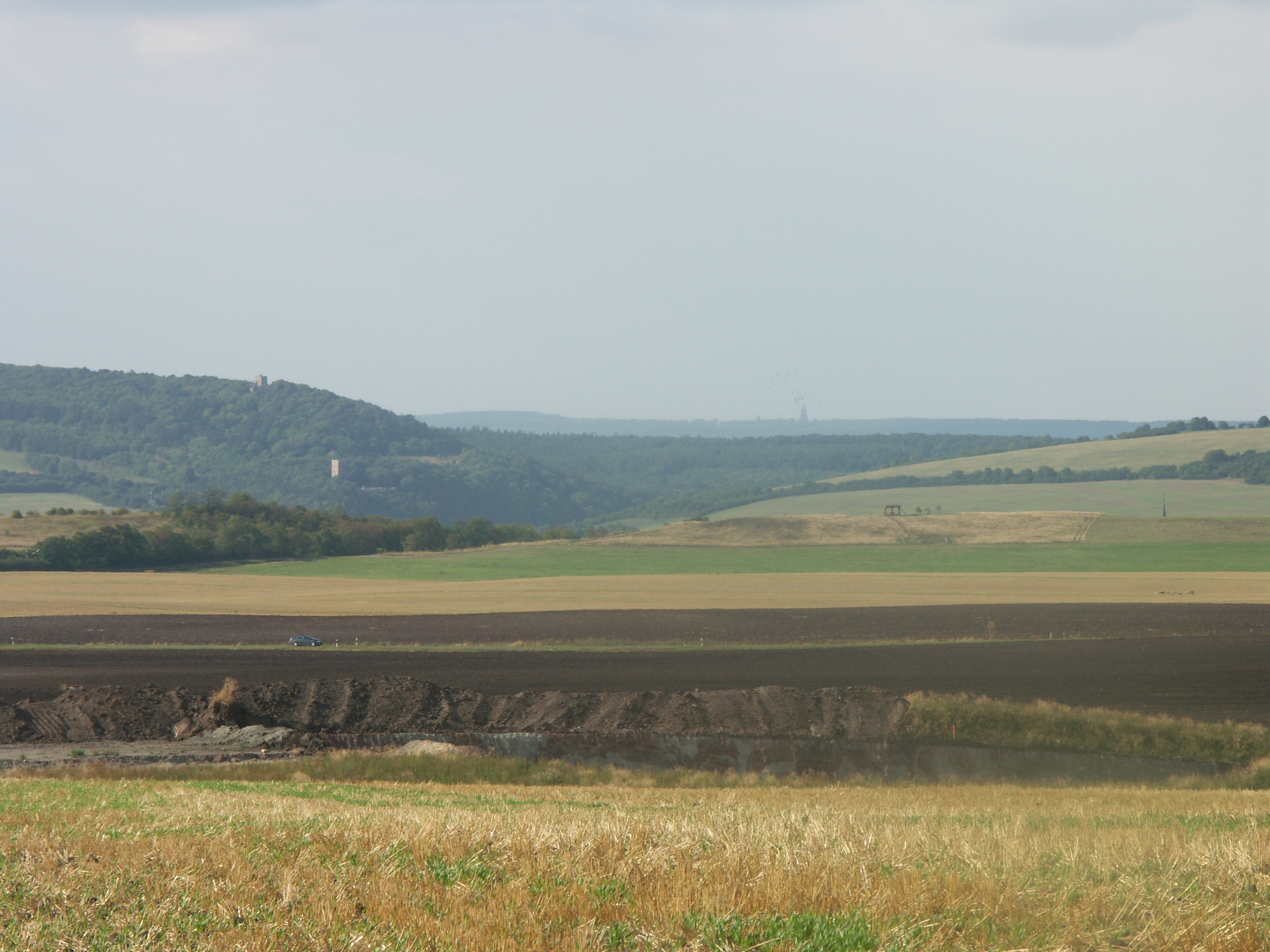
The Thuringian Gate from the south: on the horizon is the Kyffhäuser Monument; the forested ridge with the Obere and Untere Sachsenburg on the left is the eastern end of the Hainleite; opposite on the right is the start of the Schmücke.

The Schmücke (German pronunciation: [ˈʃmʏkə]), also called the Kahle Schmücke, is a hill ridge up to 380.1 m above sea level (NHN) and only about 7 km² in area. It lies within the districts of Kyffhäuserkreis and Sömmerda in the German state of Thuringia.

== Geography ==
Together with the Hohe Schrecke, the Finne and the Hainleite, the Schmücke borders the northern rim of the Thuringian Basin. It lies between Hauteroda, Oberheldrungen, Heldrungen, Heldrungen station, Gorsleben and Hemleben. It is separated from the Hainleite in the west by the Sachsenburg Gate (Sachsenburger Pforte).

== Hills ==
The hills of the Schmücke include the following, sorted by height in metres (m) above NHN:

- Künzelsberg (380.1 m), between Hauteroda and Beichlingen, Kyffhäuserkreis/Sömmerda district
- Monraburg (377.0 m), near Burgwenden, Sömmerda district
- Wendenburg (353.8 m), near Burgwenden, Sömmerda district

→ for these and other mountains and elevations see the Schmücke section of the article "List of mountains and hills in Thuringia"

The surface of much of the Schmücke is fissured by ancient quarries.

== Transport ==
In 2008, the 1,729 m long Schmücke Tunnel was built to take the A71 motorway under the Schmücke.

== Conservation ==
On 30 April 2013, the western part of the Schmücke south of Heldrungen together with the adjacent forests and southern slopes was designated a nature conservation. This also includes parts of the municipalities of Heldrungen, Oberheldrungen, Gorsleben and Hemleben. The nature reserve has an area of around 550 hectares.

The landscape is characterized by a patchwork of dry grassland, chalk heathland, pastureland, clearance cairns, shrubs, orchards, forests and arable fields. Medieval mining pits stretch along the ridge of the ridge. The size and diversity of the various heat- and dry-loving biotopes as well as their rarity provide habitats for a large number of animals and plants that have adapted to these dry conditions, which is particularly important for inter alia wild bees, grasshoppers and butterflies. In winter, western barbastelles find shelter here, which is why the area is currently considered the largest known hibernation roost for this species of bat in Thuringia.

Day trippers and hikers prefer the Schmücke because of its beauty and the extraordinary views over the Thuringian Basin. Hiking and cycling on the existing paths as well as horse riding on marked bridleways are popular activities. The area is also used by farmers, foresters and hunters.

== Climate ==
Climate data for Schmücke (1991–2020 normals)
| Month | Jan | Feb | Mar | Apr | May | Jun | Jul | Aug | Sep | Oct | Nov | Dec | Year |
|---|---|---|---|---|---|---|---|---|---|---|---|---|---|
| Mean daily maximum °C (°F) | −0.8 (30.6) | 0.0 (32.0) | 3.6 (38.5) | 8.9 (48.0) | 13.3 (55.9) | 16.4 (61.5) | 18.5 (65.3) | 18.5 (65.3) | 13.7 (56.7) | 8.5 (47.3) | 3.5 (38.3) | 0.2 (32.4) | 8.7 (47.7) |
| Daily mean °C (°F) | −2.8 (27.0) | −2.3 (27.9) | 0.6 (33.1) | 5.0 (41.0) | 9.2 (48.6) | 12.3 (54.1) | 14.3 (57.7) | 14.3 (57.7) | 10.2 (50.4) | 5.8 (42.4) | 1.3 (34.3) | −1.8 (28.8) | 5.5 (41.9) |
| Mean daily minimum °C (°F) | −4.7 (23.5) | −4.4 (24.1) | −1.9 (28.6) | 1.8 (35.2) | 5.6 (42.1) | 8.7 (47.7) | 10.9 (51.6) | 11.0 (51.8) | 7.4 (45.3) | 3.6 (38.5) | −0.5 (31.1) | −3.7 (25.3) | 2.8 (37.0) |
| Average precipitation mm (inches) | 66.0 (2.60) | 50.6 (1.99) | 49.0 (1.93) | 38.5 (1.52) | 55.0 (2.17) | 72.8 (2.87) | 92.4 (3.64) | 82.7 (3.26) | 75.5 (2.97) | 80.0 (3.15) | 67.1 (2.64) | 69.9 (2.75) | 816.4 (32.14) |
| Average precipitation days (≥ 1.0 mm) | 20.9 | 18.0 | 18.2 | 14.6 | 15.5 | 16.4 | 17.3 | 15.1 | 15.1 | 17.4 | 19.3 | 22.0 | 208.9 |
| Average relative humidity (%) | 93.6 | 91.1 | 87.4 | 78.8 | 79.3 | 79.6 | 78.9 | 78.6 | 85.8 | 91.4 | 93.8 | 93.9 | 86.0 |
| Mean monthly sunshine hours | 44.3 | 65.4 | 109.9 | 161.2 | 183.4 | 182.8 | 190.8 | 188.4 | 135.0 | 89.9 | 46.2 | 38.8 | 1,434.7 |
Source: World Meteorological Organization
