= Dingelstädt (Verwaltungsgemeinschaft) =

Coordinates: 51.317°N 10.333°E

Dingelstädt is a former Verwaltungsgemeinschaft ("collective municipality") in the district Eichsfeld, in Thuringia, Germany. The seat of the Verwaltungsgemeinschaft was in Dingelstädt. It was disbanded in January 2019.

The Verwaltungsgemeinschaft Dingelstädt consisted of the following municipalities:

1. Dingelstädt
2. Helmsdorf
3. Kallmerode
4. Kefferhausen
5. Kreuzebra
6. Silberhausen
