= Thuringian Gate =

Coordinates: 51°17′51″N 11°10′19″E

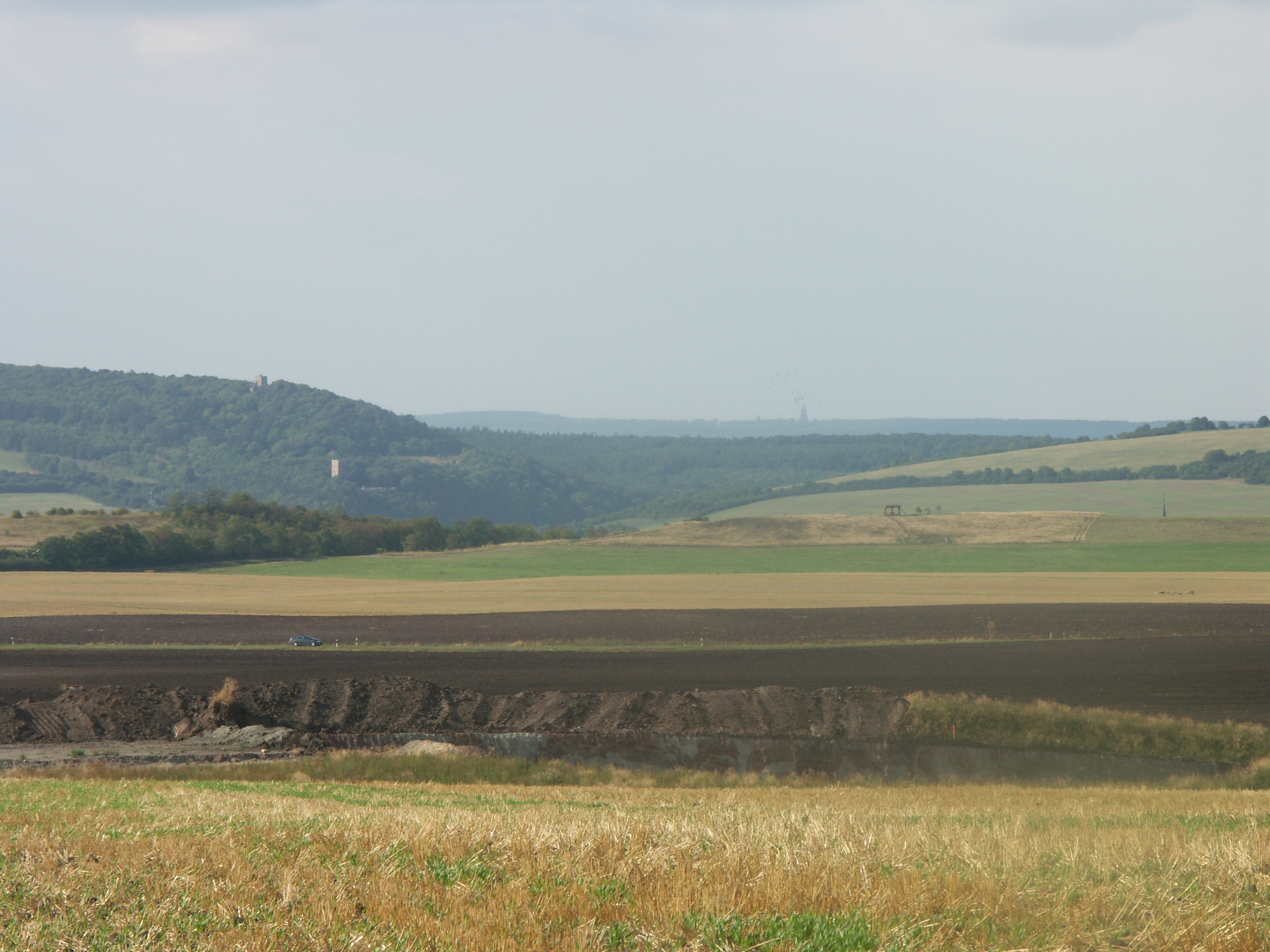
Thuringian Gate

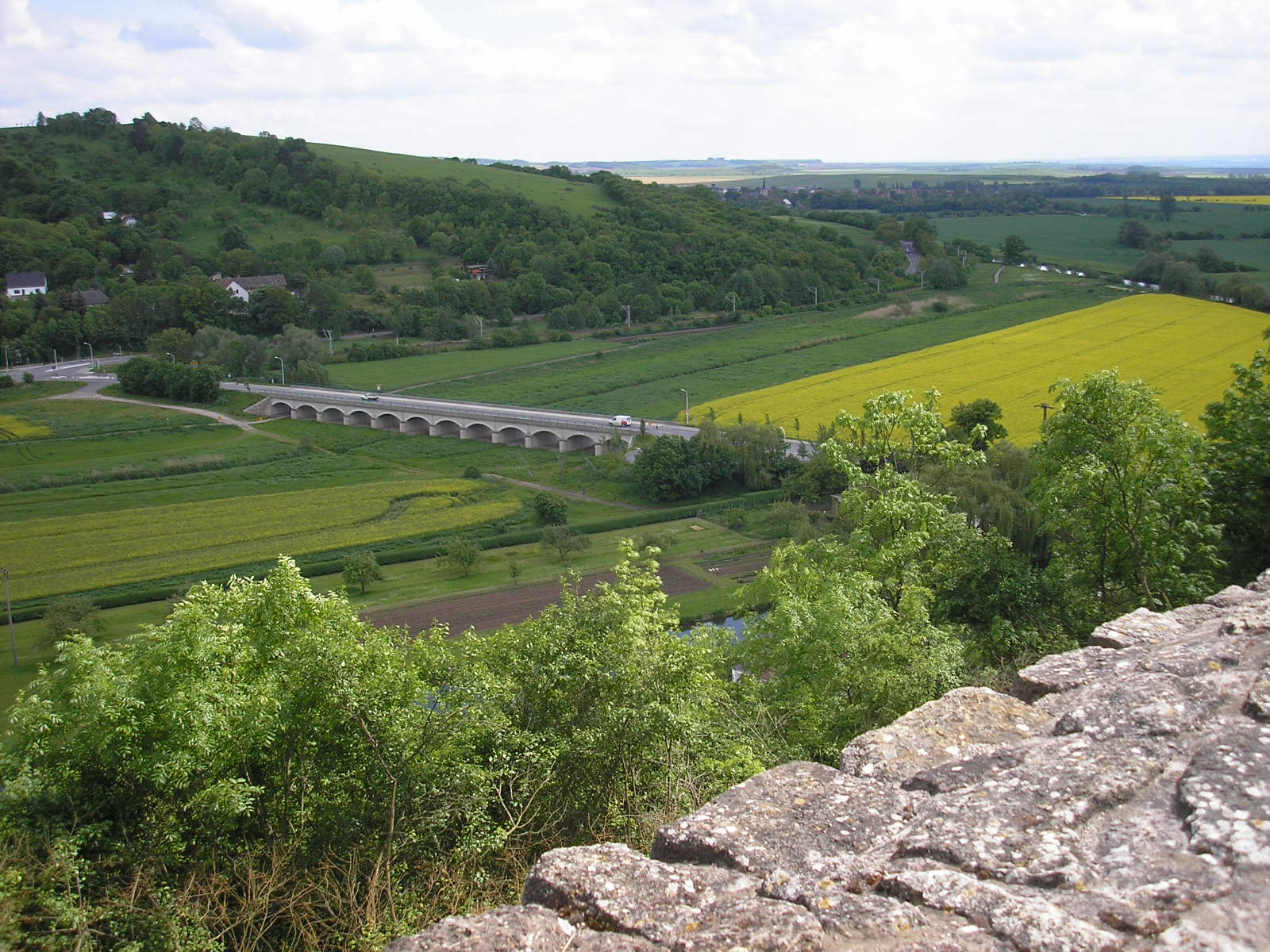
View of the Thuringian Gate and the B85/B86 bridge over the Unstrut

The Thuringian Gate (German: Thüringer Pforte) near Sachsenburg, a district of Oldisleben, west of Heldrungen in central Germany, is where the gorge of the river Unstrut breaks out of the Thuringian Basin through the Hainleite and Schmücke hills to the north. It is also known as the Sachsenburg Gate.

This topographical feature carved out by the Unstrut has always been used as a communication route. Today the B 85 and B 86 federal roads and the Sangerhausen–Erfurt railway pass through the gorge. The Thuringian Gate was guarded in medieval times by the fortresses of Upper and Lower Sachsenburg.
