= Mittelzentrum Artern =

Former municipal association in Germany

Coordinates: 51.367°N 11.300°E

Mittelzentrum Artern is a former Verwaltungsgemeinschaft ("collective municipality") in the district Kyffhäuserkreis, in Thuringia, Germany. The seat of the Verwaltungsgemeinschaft was in Artern, itself not part of the Verwaltungsgemeinschaft. It was disbanded in January 2019.

The Verwaltungsgemeinschaft Mittelzentrum Artern consisted of the following municipalities:

1. Borxleben
2. Gehofen
3. Heygendorf
4. Ichstedt
5. Kalbsrieth
6. Mönchpfiffel-Nikolausrieth
7. Nausitz
8. Reinsdorf
9. Ringleben
10. Voigtstedt
