= An der Schmücke =

- Town
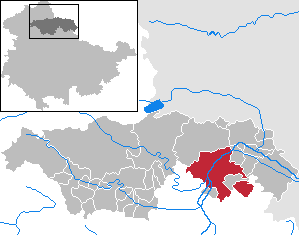
- Location of An der Schmücke within Kyffhäuserkreis district
- Interactive map of An der Schmücke
- Location within Germany Location within Thuringia
- Coordinates: 51°18′N 11°13′E
- Country: Germany
- State: Thuringia
- District: Kyffhäuserkreis
- Subdivisions: 9

Government
  - Mayor (2021–27): Silvana Schäffer (CDU)

Area
  - Total: 95.29 km^{2} (36.79 sq mi)
- Elevation: 180 m (590 ft)

Population (2025-12-31)
  - Total: 5,881
  - Density: 61.72/km^{2} (159.8/sq mi)
- Time zone: UTC+01:00 (CET)
  - Summer (DST): UTC+02:00 (CEST)
- Postal codes: 06556, 06577, 06578
- Dialling codes: 034673
- Vehicle registration: KYF

An der Schmücke (German pronunciation: [an deːɐ̯ ˈʃmʏkə], lit. 'On the Schmücke') is a town in the district Kyffhäuserkreis, in Thuringia, Germany. It was created with effect from 1 January 2019 by the merger of the former municipalities of Bretleben, Gorsleben, Hauteroda, Heldrungen, Hemleben and Oldisleben. Between 1993 and 2019, these municipalities were part of the Verwaltungsgemeinschaft ("collective municipality") An der Schmücke, which additionally contained the municipalities Etzleben and Oberheldrungen. The seat of the town and the former Verwaltungsgemeinschaft is in Heldrungen.
