= Finne, Saxony-Anhalt =

Finne
- Municipality
- Location of Finne within Burgenlandkreis district
- Interactive map of Finne
- Location within Germany Location within Saxony-Anhalt
- Coordinates: 51°13′N 11°26′E
- Country: Germany
- State: Saxony-Anhalt
- District: Burgenlandkreis
- Municipal assoc.: An der Finne
- Subdivisions: 3

Government
  - Mayor (2024–31): Detlef Hartung

Area
  - Total: 25.04 km^{2} (9.67 sq mi)

Population (2025-12-31)
  - Total: 1,137
  - Density: 45.41/km^{2} (117.6/sq mi)
- Time zone: UTC+01:00 (CET)
  - Summer (DST): UTC+02:00 (CEST)
- Postal codes: 06647
- Dialling codes: 036377
- Vehicle registration: BLK, HHM, NEB, NMB, WSF, ZZ

Finne (German pronunciation: [ˈfɪnə]) is a municipality in the Burgenlandkreis district, in Saxony-Anhalt, Germany. It was formed by the merger of the previously independent municipalities Billroda and Lossa, on 1 July 2009. It was named after the Finne, a range of low hills situated between Heldrungen and Bad Sulza.
