= Hainleite =

Hill range in Germany

The Hainleite (German pronunciation: [ˈhaɪnˌlaɪtə]) is a Muschelkalk ridge of hills up to 463.2 m above sea level (NN) in northern Thuringia, Germany.

== Geography ==
This heavily wooded landscape lies between Bleicherode in Nordhausen district, Sondershausen in Kyffhäuser district, Bad Frankenhausen, Dingelstädt, Oldisleben, Kindelbrück and Schernberg. It is bordered to the north by the Kyffhäuser Hills (German: Kyffhäuser Gebirge) on the other side of the Wipper, to the east – beyond the so-called Thuringian Gate, a gorge carved out by the Unstrut near little Sachsenburg – by the Schmücke and the Hohe Schrecke, and to the south and southwest by the Thuringian Basin.

=== Important towns ===
- Sondershausen, capital of Kyffhäuser district
- Bad Frankenhausen

=== Hills ===
The highest elevation is the 463.2 m above sea level (NN) point located in the western part of the Hainleite between Immenrode and Straußberg. Other hills include the Possen (420 m), the Heidelberg (403 m) and the Kuhberg (406 m).

=== Geology and landscape ===
The underlying rock consists of red sandstone and Muschelkalk.

To the north the Hainleite falls relatively steeply into the valley of the Wipper (about 200–163 m), which joins the Unstrut at Sachsenburg. To the south the dip slope of the Hainleite descends relatively gently into the Erfurt Lowland (Erfurter Tiefebene, part of the Thuringian Basin).

The vegetation on the Hainleite is characterised by mixed woods and, especially in the east, by dense beech forest. The undergrowth below the trees is dominated by Perlgras and Martagon lilies. Species of orchid abound on the open Muschelkalk slopes.

The region north of the Hainleite in the valley of the Wipper between Bad Frankenhausen and Artern is also known as the Diamond Meadow (Diamantene Aue).

=== Walking ===
Although not as well known as the Thuringian Forest, the Hainleite is nevertheless a popular walking area. In the area of the district town of Sondershausen alone there are over 30 walking routes. The following well-known trails run from west to east over the crest of the Hainleite:

- The Barbarossa trail (Barbarossaweg) from (Korbach, Hessen) to Kyffhäuser
- The Hainleite trail (Hainleitewanderweg, no. S2) from Friedrichroda to Sachsenburg
- The main trail (Hauptwanderweg) Eisenach–Sondershausen–Kyffhäuser–Wernigerode

== Economy ==
The Hainleite is mainly used for forestry due to the quality of its woods. But tourism also plays an important role.

Tourist centres are:

- Teich Valley Recreation Park (Erholungszentrum Teichtal) near Hainrode
- Sondershausen with its castle
- Straußberg Adventure Park (Erlebnispark Straußberg) with its monkey forest and Sommerrodelbahn
- Possen Hunting Lodge Recreation Park (Erholungszentrum Jagdschloss PossenErholungszentrum), near Sondershausen with bungalows and the historic Possen tower (newly renovated – the highest timber-framed tower in Germany)
- Bad Frankenhausen spa town (near the Kyffhäuser monument)

== Transport ==
The Hainleite area has good road and rail access. The railway network links the towns of Nordhausen and Sondershausen. The area can be approached by car from the north on the A 38 motorway and B 80 road and from the south by the A 4. The B 4 and B 85 roads run directly over the Hainleite and link the two trunk routes. The north–south link will be improved when the A 71 is completed; currently it only runs from the A 4 near Erfurt as far as Sömmerda.

== Literature ==
- Harald Rockstuhl: Sagenbuch vom Dün aus dem Helbetal und von der Hainleite in Thüringen, Verlag Rockstuhl, Bad Langensalza, 2005, ISBN 3-937135-71-5
