= Finne (hills) =

Hill range in Germany

Coordinates: 51°10′55″N 11°27′02″E

The Finne (German pronunciation: [ˈfɪnə]) is a ridge of hills in the German states of Saxony-Anhalt and Thuringia up to 370.1 m above sea level (NHN) and 23 km long.

== Geography ==
Together with the Schmücke, the Hohe Schrecke and the Hainleite, the Finne borders the northeastern rim of the Thuringian Basin. It lies between Bad Sulza and Hauteroda.

The Finne Tunnel, which has a total length of 6.885 m and is part of the Erfurt–Leipzig/Halle high-speed railway, passes through the Finne ridge.

== Hills ==
- Künzelsberg 380 m above sea level (NN)
- Seligenbornsberg 355 m above NN
- Wendenburg bei Burgwenden 354 m above NN
- Buchberg 350 m above NN

== Nature conservation ==
Parts of the Finne have been declared a nature reserve.

The nature reserve was notified to the European Commission as part of the Hohe Schrecke - Finne Flora-Fauna Habitat Region.
