= Wetzelshain =

Coordinates: 51°15′17.3″N 11°20′1.4″E

Wetzelshain is the name of a late medieval abandoned village on a plateau in the central part of the Hohe Schrecke ridge in the county of Sömmerda in the German state of Thuringia.

It is located in the eponymous forest reserve about 5.5 km west-southwest of the town of Wiehe. This village was a clearing settlement and was first mentioned in the records in 1226. The village belonged to St. Peter's in Mainz and had its own church. But as early as around 1480 the place is described as abandoned. On the site of the village there are only a few signs of settlement in the shape of uneven ground. The vicinity of the site is also interesting: only two kilometres to the east lie the remains of Rabenswalde Castle; this was the main residence of the lords of Rabenswalde, a branch of the family of the counts of Kevernburg. The castle was besieged and destroyed around 1350 after the Rabenswaldes became robber knights during the Thuringian Counts' War. It is possible that settlements around the castle were also attacked and destroyed at the time the castle was slighted. Only about 1.5 km southeast of Wetzelshain lies another abandoned village that bears the name Lichtehain.
