= Saalfeld, Mühlhausen =

Saalfeld
- Ortsteil of Mühlhausen
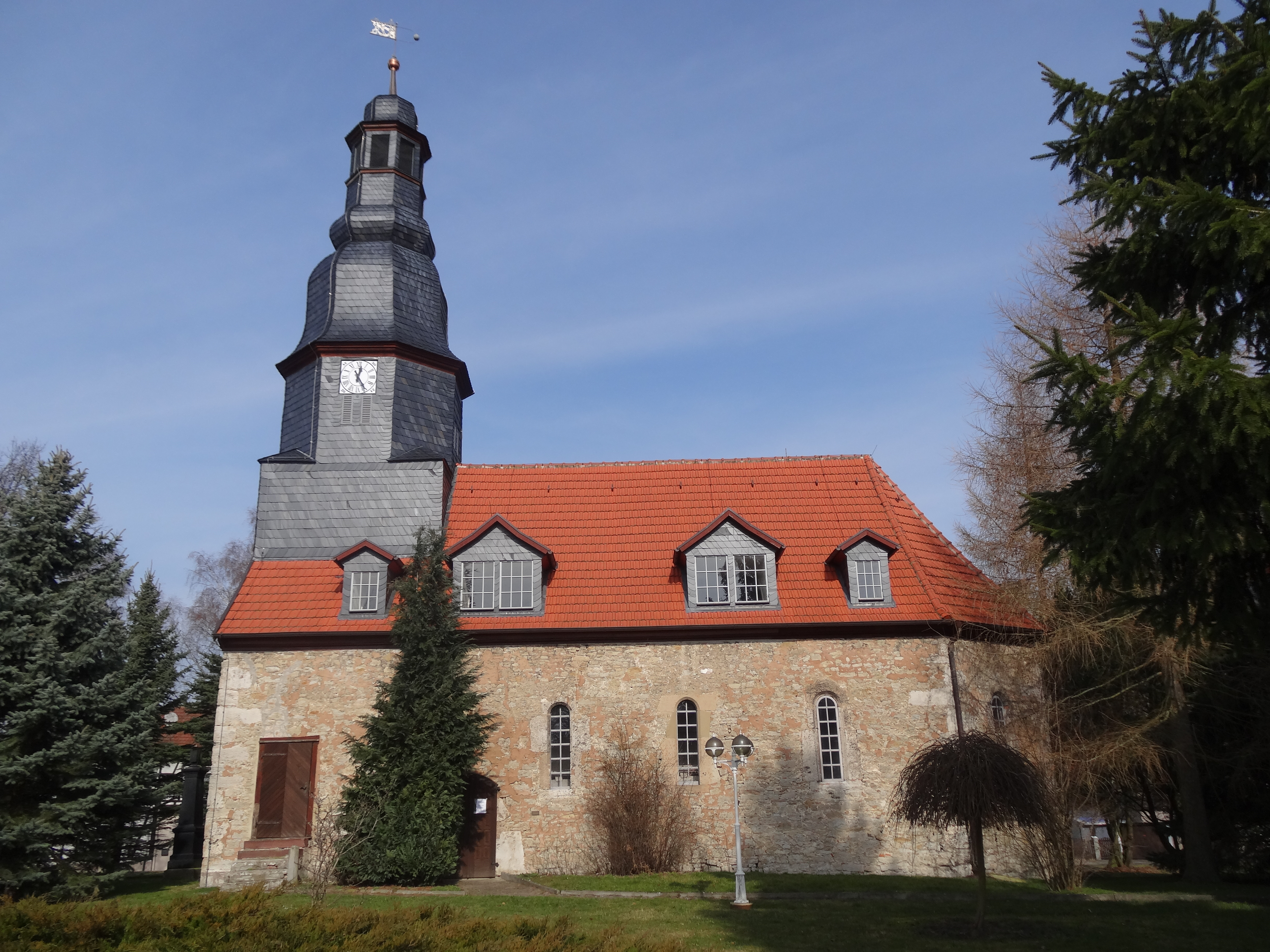
- St Nicholas's Church
- Interactive map of Saalfeld
- Location within Germany Location within Thuringia
- Coordinates: 51.263689°N 10.528314°E
- Country: Germany
- State: Thuringia
- District: Unstrut-Hainich-Kreis
- Town: Mühlhausen
- First mentioned: 1273

Government
  - Mayor: Silvio Fischer
- Elevation: 352 m (1,155 ft)

Population (March 2021)
  - Total: 162
- Time zone: UTC+01:00 (CET)
  - Summer (DST): UTC+02:00 (CEST)
- Postal codes: 99974
- Dialling codes: 036029
- Vehicle registration: UH, LSZ, MHL
- Website: muehlhausen.de

Saalfeld (pronounced [ˈzaːlfɛlt]) near Mühlhausen in Thuringia, central Germany, is a village that was incorporated into the town in 1994.

== Geography ==
Saalfeld lies on the edge of the Thuringian Basin, several kilometres north of the core town of Mühlhausen. The village is connected to the town and the surrounding area via the Landesstraße (state road) 1016.

== History ==
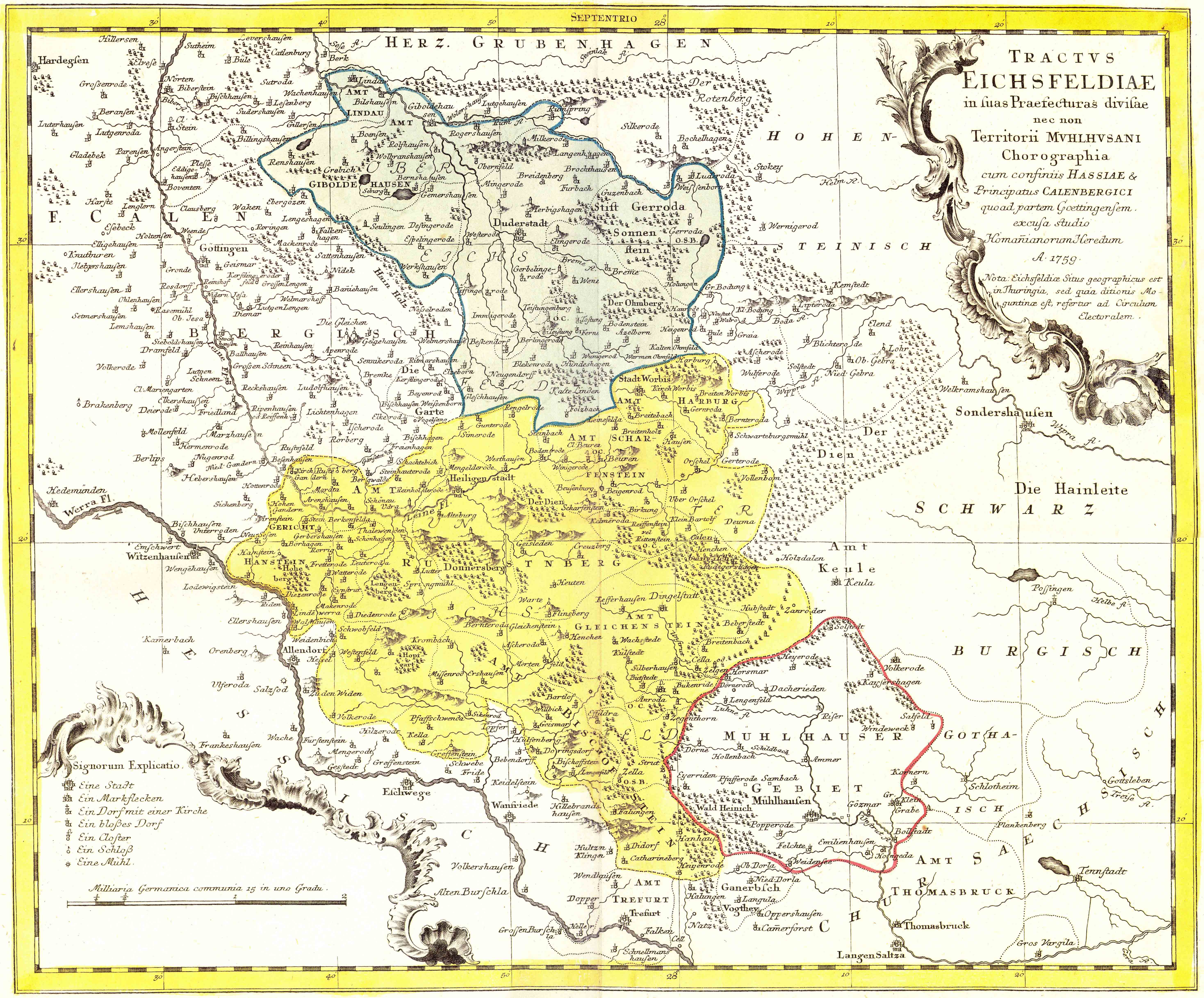
The Eichsfeld region and the territory of the Reichsstadt (imperial city) of Mühlhausen with "Salfeld" (Saalfeld) around 1759 (the map contains some errors)

The village was first mentioned in a document on 29 October 1273. For centuries, it belonged to the sphere of influence of the Reichsstadt (imperial city) of Mühlhausen. In 1565, the (male) population of Saalfeld was 46. In 1802, Saalfeld, together with Mühlhausen, fell to the Kingdom of Prussia, from 1807 to 1813 to the Kingdom of Westphalia (canton Dachrieden) created by Napoleon, and after the Congress of Vienna in 1816, it was assigned to the Landkreis Mühlhausen i. Th. in the Prussian Province of Saxony. On 8 March 1994, Saalfeld was incorporated into the town of Mühlhausen.

== Sights ==
- St Nicholas's Church
