= Oldisleben I =

Archaeological site near Weimar, Germany

Oldisleben I is an archeological site of the Eemian interglacial period located north of Weimar in the Oldisleben municipality, Germany. Findings at the site include some of the earliest known engravings on portable objects of bone, ivory and stone, dating back between 135,000 and 80,000 BP.
