= Wiehe =

- Ortsteil of Roßleben-Wiehe
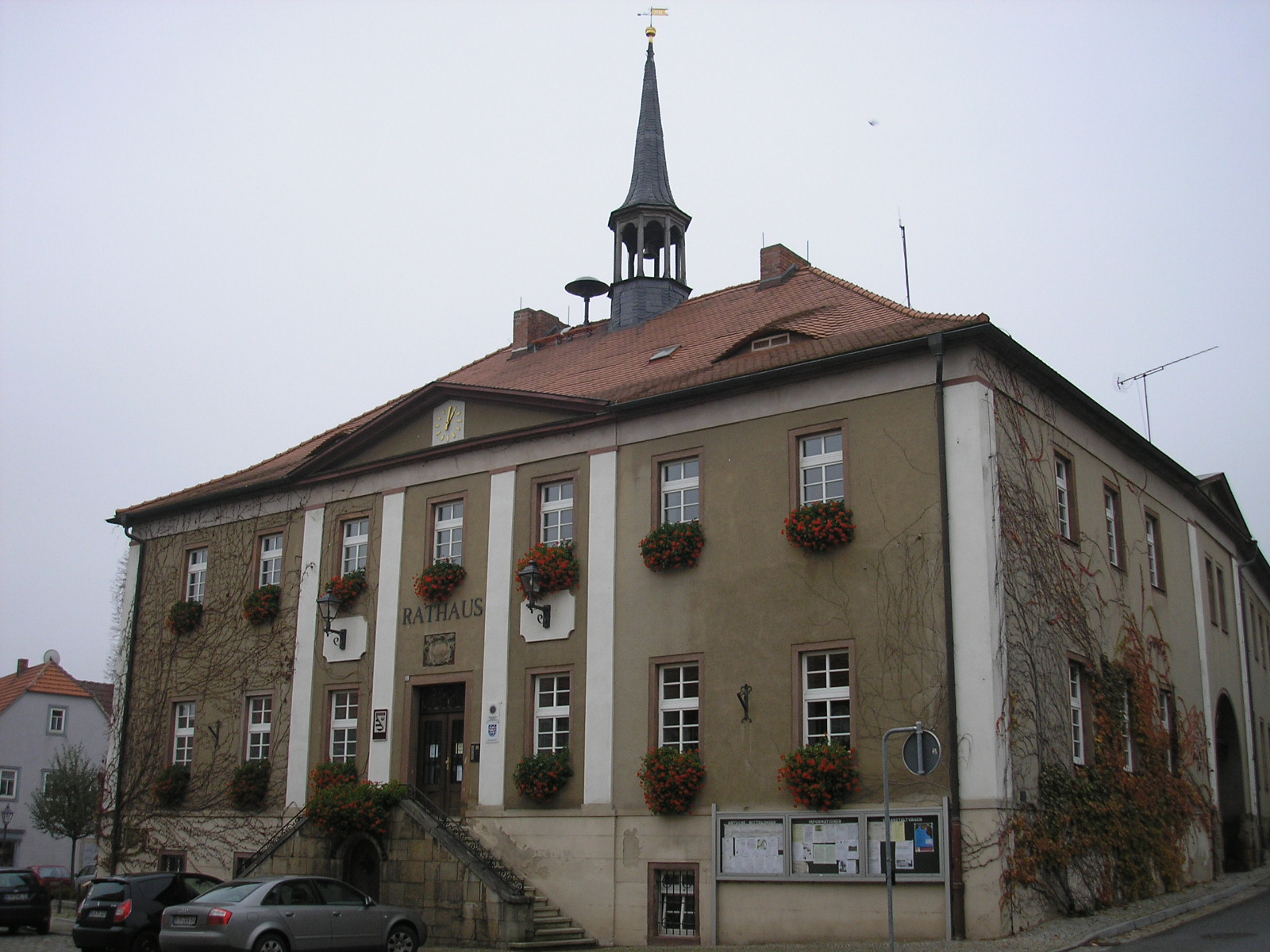
- Town hall

- Coat of arms
- Interactive map of Wiehe
- Location within Germany Location within Thuringia
- Coordinates: 51°16′N 11°25′E
- Country: Germany
- State: Thuringia
- District: Kyffhäuserkreis
- Town: Roßleben-Wiehe

Area
  - Total: 24.53 km^{2} (9.47 sq mi)
- Elevation: 140 m (460 ft)

Population (2017-12-31)
  - Total: 1,871
  - Density: 76.27/km^{2} (197.5/sq mi)
- Time zone: UTC+01:00 (CET)
  - Summer (DST): UTC+02:00 (CEST)
- Postal codes: 06571
- Dialling codes: 034672
- Website: rossleben-wiehe.de

Wiehe (German pronunciation: [ˈviːə]) is a town and a former municipality in the Kyffhäuserkreis district, in Thuringia, Germany. Since 1 January 2019, it is part of the town Roßleben-Wiehe. It is situated 24 kilometres (15 mi) south of Sangerhausen, and 32 kilometres (20 mi) north of Weimar.

== Location ==
Wiehe is located in the valley of the Unstrut on the northern slope of the Hohe Schrecke, a wooded mountain ridge. State roads 1215 and 1217 are the traffic connections to the surrounding area of Saxony-Anhalt and Thuringia.

== Arms ==
Blazon: “In silver a haloed saint in a blue cloak, in his right hand a raised silver knife, holding a staff in his left hand; at his feet a black shield, inside a golden branch bend with three golden maple leaves."

The coat of arms shows St. Bartholomew, the patron saint of the parish church in Wiehe, with his attributes. The shield shows the family coat of arms of the Lords of Werthern, who held lordship initially through resale from 1453 and hereditarily from 1461 in the repeatedly divided Grafschaft Wiehe. The shield first appeared in the middle of the 16th century on a seal with the inscription: SIGILLVM CIVITATIS WIHE. On earlier seals, Bartholomew can be seen alone under a baldachin.

== Notable residents ==
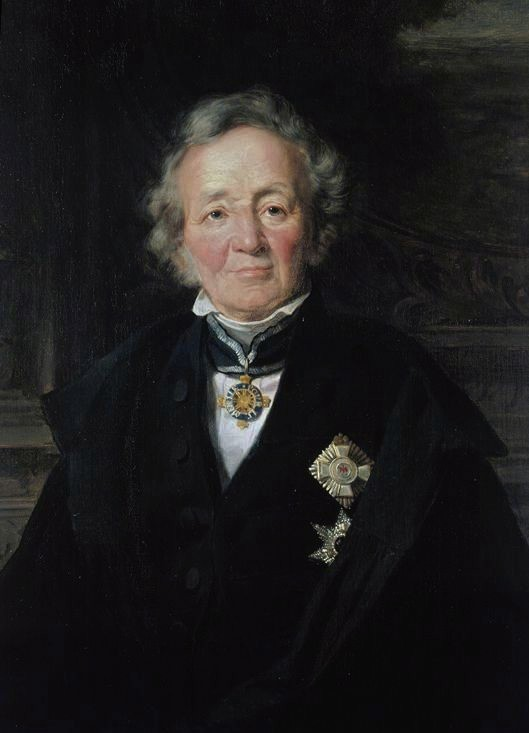
Leopold von Ranke 1875

- Karl Ferdinand Ranke (1802–1876), Classical philologist and teacher
- Leopold von Ranke (1795–1886), historian
- Friedrich Heinrich Ranke (1798–1876), Protestant theologian
- Ernst Ranke (1814–1888), Protestant theologian
- Hermann Necke (1850–1912), composer
