= Bretleben =

- Ortsteil of An der Schmücke
- Interactive map of Bretleben
- Location within Germany Location within Thuringia
- Coordinates: 51°20′N 11°14′E
- Country: Germany
- State: Thuringia
- District: Kyffhäuserkreis
- Town: An der Schmücke

Area
  - Total: 8.69 km^{2} (3.36 sq mi)
- Elevation: 128 m (420 ft)

Population (2017-12-31)
  - Total: 530
  - Density: 61/km^{2} (160/sq mi)
- Time zone: UTC+01:00 (CET)
  - Summer (DST): UTC+02:00 (CEST)
- Postal codes: 06556
- Dialling codes: 034673
- Website: www.bretleben.de

Bretleben (German pronunciation: [ˈbʁeːtˌleːbn̩]) is a village and a former municipality in the Kyffhäuserkreis district in Thuringia, Germany. Since 1 January 2019, it is part of the town An der Schmücke. It is located at the right side of the river Unstrut, between the towns of Heldrungen and Artern. It has a station on the Sangerhausen–Erfurt railway line, where a now-decommissioned line once branched off to Bad Frankenhausen and Sondershausen.

== History ==
The earliest known documented mention of Bretleben is as Bretalaho in an early 9th century document.

=== Historical Population ===
Number of inhabitants (as of 31 December):

- 1994: 760
- 1995: 750
- 1996: 736
- 1997: 705
- 1998: 688
- 1999: 685
- 2000: 682
- 2001: 667
- 2002: 661
- 2003: 657
- 2004: 651
- 2005: 634
- 2006: 642
- 2007: 621
- 2008: 605
- 2009: 593
- 2010: 579
- 2011: 577
- 2012: 566
- 2013: 559
- 2014: 553
- 2015: 541
- 2016: 529
- 2017: 530

Source: Thuringian state statistical bureau

== Transport ==
Bretleben is on the Sangerhause-Erfurt railway line. The so-called Kyffhäuserbahn to Sondershausen branched from Bretleben, but the train doesn't run anymore. The line was decommissioned in September 2008. The Bundesstraße 86 passes nearby and the Bundesautobahn 71 between Sömmerda and Sangerhausen crosses the river Unstrut between Bretleben and Artern. The nearest exits to Bretleben are Exit 2 Artern, and Exit 3 Heldrungen.
