= Roßleben-Wiehe =

- Town
- Coat of arms

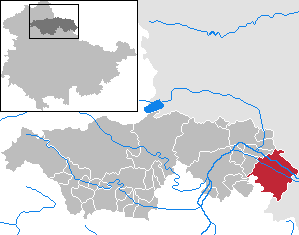
- Location of Roßleben-Wiehe within Kyffhäuserkreis district
- Interactive map of Roßleben-Wiehe
- Location within Germany Location within Thuringia
- Coordinates: 51°18′N 11°26′E
- Country: Germany
- State: Thuringia
- District: Kyffhäuserkreis
- Subdivisions: 10

Area
  - Total: 73.04 km^{2} (28.20 sq mi)
- Elevation: 140 m (460 ft)

Population (2025-12-31)
  - Total: 7,062
  - Density: 96.69/km^{2} (250.4/sq mi)
- Time zone: UTC+01:00 (CET)
  - Summer (DST): UTC+02:00 (CEST)
- Postal codes: 06571, 06556
- Dialling codes: 03466, 034672
- Vehicle registration: KYF

Roßleben-Wiehe (German pronunciation: [ˈʁɔsˌleːbn̩ ˈviːə]) is a town and a municipality in the district Kyffhäuserkreis, in Thuringia, Germany. It was created with effect from 1 January 2019 by the merger of the former municipalities of Roßleben, Wiehe, Donndorf and Nausitz.
