= Karl Ferdinand Ranke =

German educator and classical philologist (1802–1876)

Karl Ferdinand Ranke (26 May 1802, in Wiehe – 29 March 1876, in Berlin) was a German educator and classical philologist. He was the brother of historian Leopold von Ranke (1795–1886) and theologians Friedrich Heinrich Ranke (1798–1876) and Ernst Constantin Ranke (1815–1888).

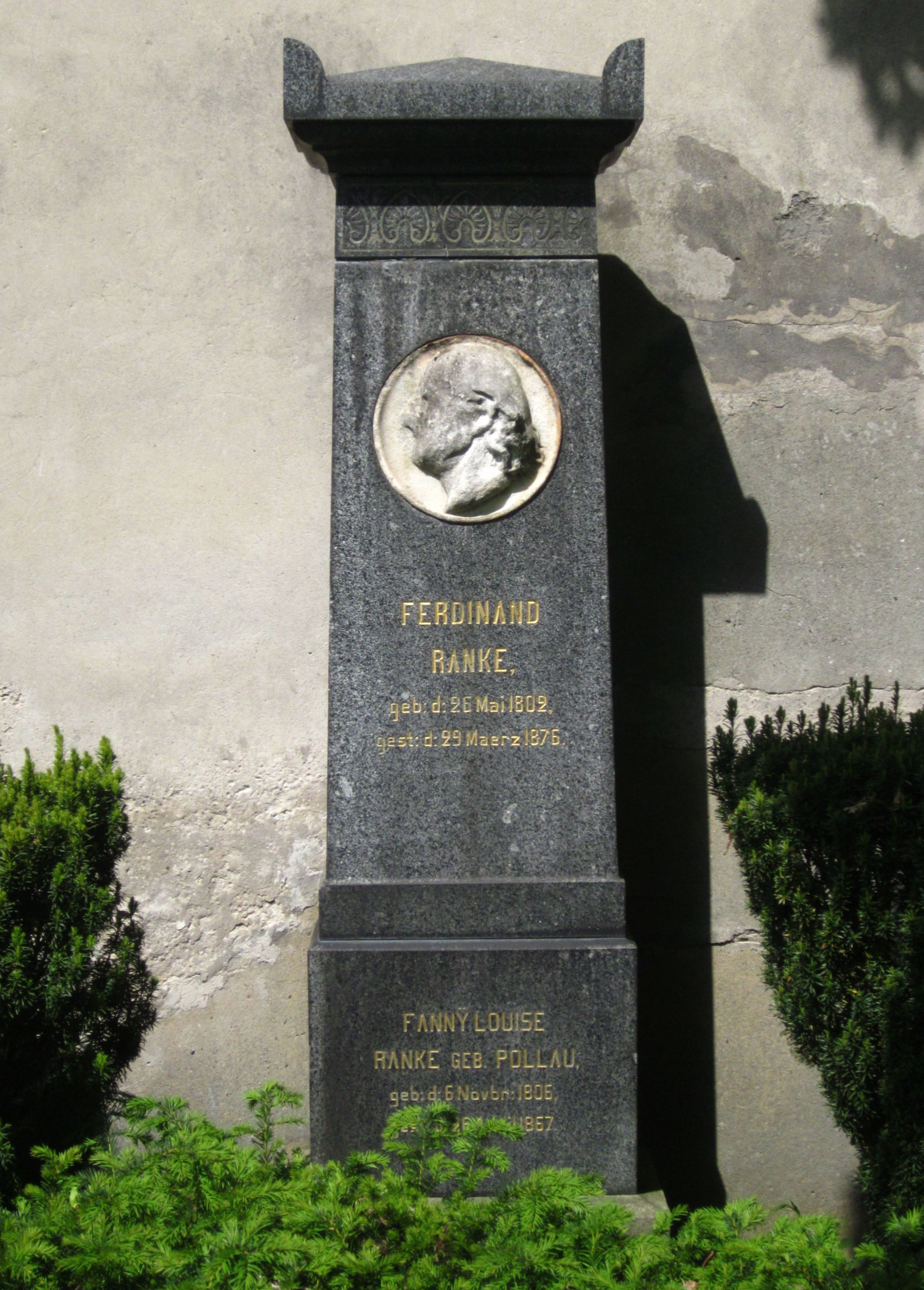
Grave of Ranke at Dreifaltigkeitsfriedhof II of the Trinity Church in Berlin-Kreuzberg

He studied theology and philology at the University of Halle, afterwards working as a schoolteacher at the Francke Foundations (Halle). In 1831 he was named director of the gymnasium in Quedlinburg, later transferring to Göttingen as successor to Friedrich August Grotefend as director of its gymnasium. In 1841 he became a professor at the University of Göttingen, and during the following year, was appointed director of the Friedrich-Wilhelms-Gymnasium in Berlin.

As a director of gymnasiums, he made important contributions towards the educational-methodical reorganization of the Prussian education system. In the field of classical philology, he was the author of significant works on Hesiod, Aristophanes, Xenophon, et al. He also published biographies on classical scholars Karl Otfried Müller (1870) and August Meineke (1871).

== Selected works ==
- "Pollux et Lucianus. Commentatio", (1831).
- Ueber den Ursprung Quedlinburgs. Ein historischer Versuch, etc. (1833) – Origins at Quedlinburg. A historical experiment, etc.
- "De Hesiodi Operibus et diebus commentatio", (1838)
- Hesiodeische Studien, (1840) – Hesiodic studies.
- "De Aristophanis vita commentatio", (1846).
- "De Xenophontis vita et scriptis commentatio", (1851).
- Karl Otfried Müller ein Lebensbild, (1870).
- August Meineke; ein lebensbild, (1871).
