= Helmsdorf, Thuringia =

Helmsdorf
- Ortsteil of Dingelstädt
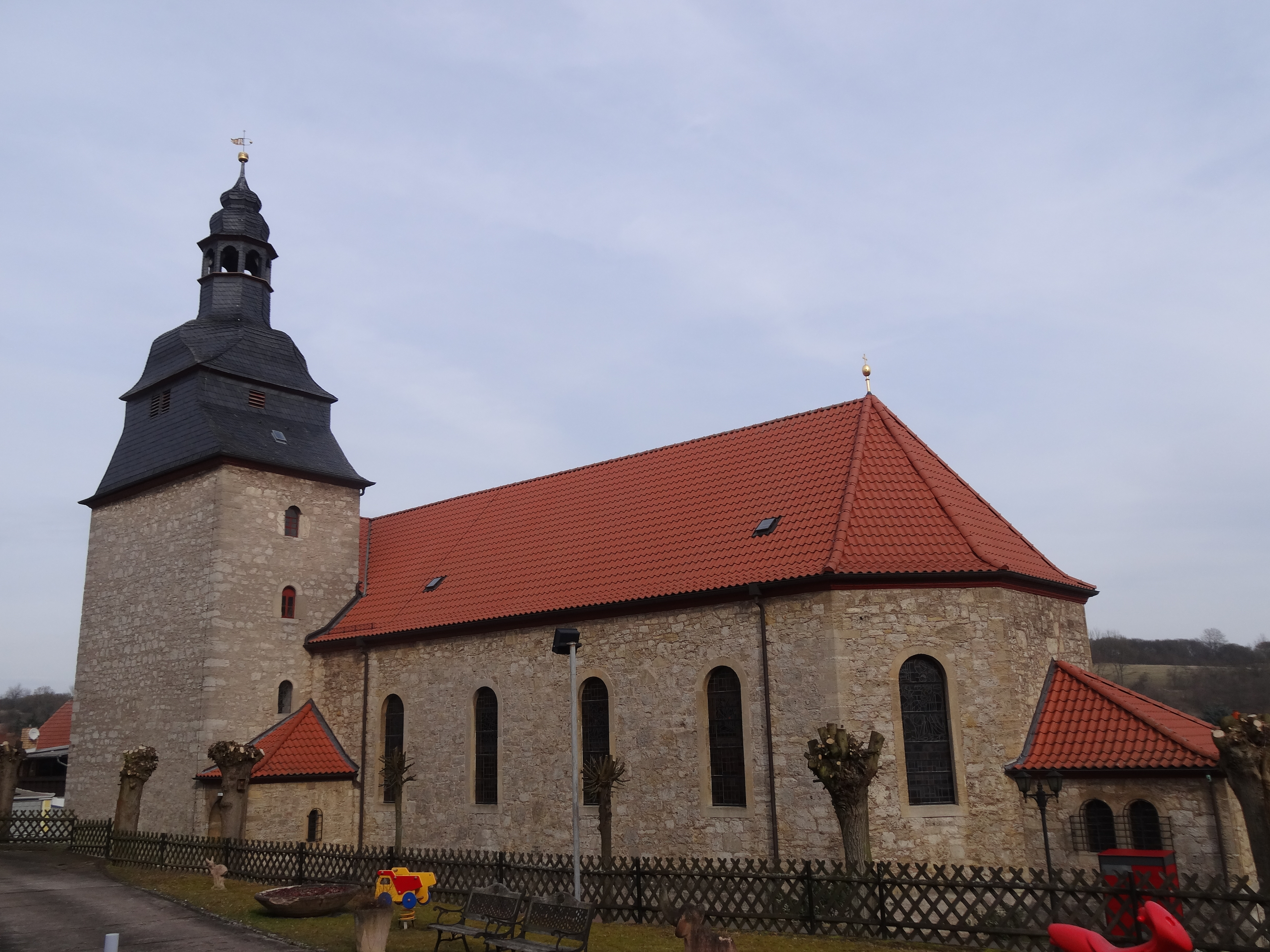
- Church in Helmsdorf

- Coat of arms
- Interactive map of Helmsdorf
- Location within Germany Location within Thuringia
- Coordinates: 51°17′48″N 10°21′4″E
- Country: Germany
- State: Thuringia
- District: Eichsfeld
- Town: Dingelstädt

Area
  - Total: 5.24 km^{2} (2.02 sq mi)
- Elevation: 306 m (1,004 ft)

Population (2017-12-31)
  - Total: 501
  - Density: 95.6/km^{2} (248/sq mi)
- Time zone: UTC+01:00 (CET)
  - Summer (DST): UTC+02:00 (CEST)
- Postal codes: 37351
- Dialling codes: 036075
- Vehicle registration: EIC

Helmsdorf (German pronunciation: [ˈhɛlmsdɔʁf]) is a village and a former municipality in the district of Eichsfeld in Thuringia, Germany. Since 1 January 2019, it is part of the town Dingelstädt. It is situated on the upper course of the river Unstrut, 12 km northwest of Mühlhausen.
