= Billroda =

- Ortsteil of Finne
- Interactive map of Billroda
- Location within Germany Location within Saxony-Anhalt
- Coordinates: 51°12′6″N 11°27′27″E
- Country: Germany
- State: Saxony-Anhalt
- District: Burgenlandkreis
- Town: Finne

Area
  - Total: 8.98 km^{2} (3.47 sq mi)
- Elevation: 252 m (827 ft)

Population (2007-12-31)
  - Total: 505
  - Density: 56.2/km^{2} (146/sq mi)
- Time zone: UTC+01:00 (CET)
  - Summer (DST): UTC+02:00 (CEST)
- Postal codes: 06647
- Dialling codes: 036377
- Vehicle registration: BLK

Billroda (German pronunciation: [bɪlˈʁoːda]) is a village and a former municipality in the Burgenlandkreis district, in Saxony-Anhalt, Germany. Since 1 July 2009, it is part of the Finne municipality.
