= Borxleben =

- Municipality
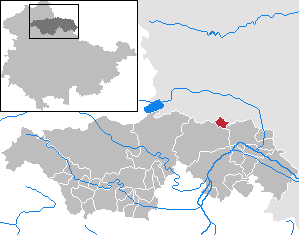
- Location of Borxleben within Kyffhäuserkreis district
- Interactive map of Borxleben
- Location within Germany Location within Thuringia
- Coordinates: 51°23′48″N 11°13′42″E
- Country: Germany
- State: Thuringia
- District: Kyffhäuserkreis

Government
  - Mayor (2022–28): Jochen Franke

Area
  - Total: 5.33 km^{2} (2.06 sq mi)
- Elevation: 134 m (440 ft)

Population (2025-12-31)
  - Total: 261
  - Density: 49.0/km^{2} (127/sq mi)
- Time zone: UTC+01:00 (CET)
  - Summer (DST): UTC+02:00 (CEST)
- Postal codes: 06556
- Dialling codes: 0 34 66
- Vehicle registration: KYF

Borxleben is a village in the district Kyffhäuserkreis, in Thuringia, Germany.

== History ==
Between 30 June 1994 and 1 January 2019, Borxleben was part of the Mittelzentrum Artern collective municipality.

== Population ==
As of 31 December each year:

- 1994 – 413
- 1995 – 399
- 1996 – 395
- 1997 – 407
- 1998 – 413
- 1999 – 395
- 2000 – 387
- 2001 – 370
- 2002 – 356
- 2003 – 359
- 2004 – 366
- 2005 – 359
- 2006 – 345
- 2007 – 334
- 2008 – 311
- 2009 – 315
- 2010 – 304
- 2011 – 293
- 2012 – 293
- 2013 – 293
- 2014 – 292
- 2015 – 281

Source: Thuringian State Statistical Bureau

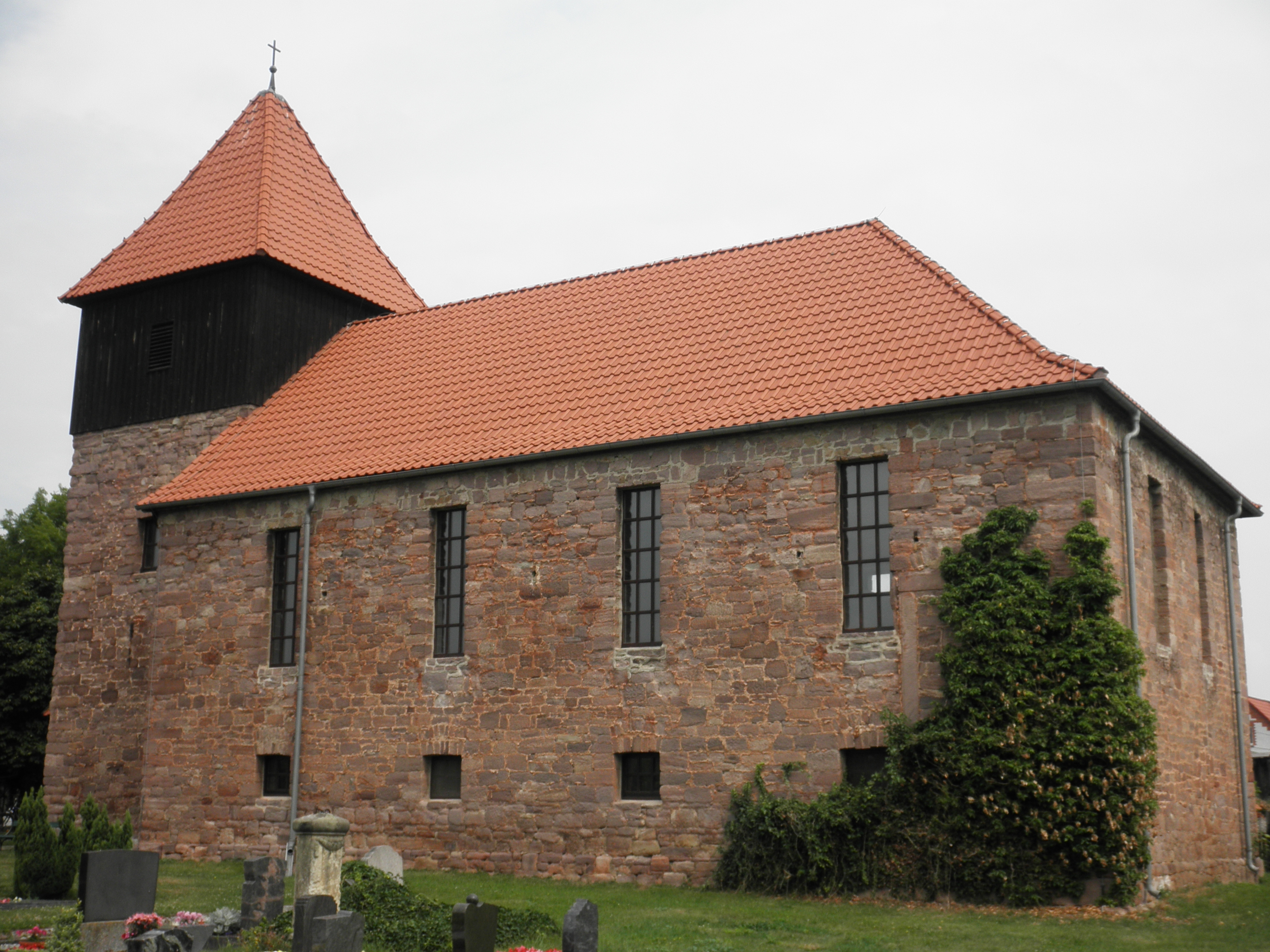
Borxleben Chapel

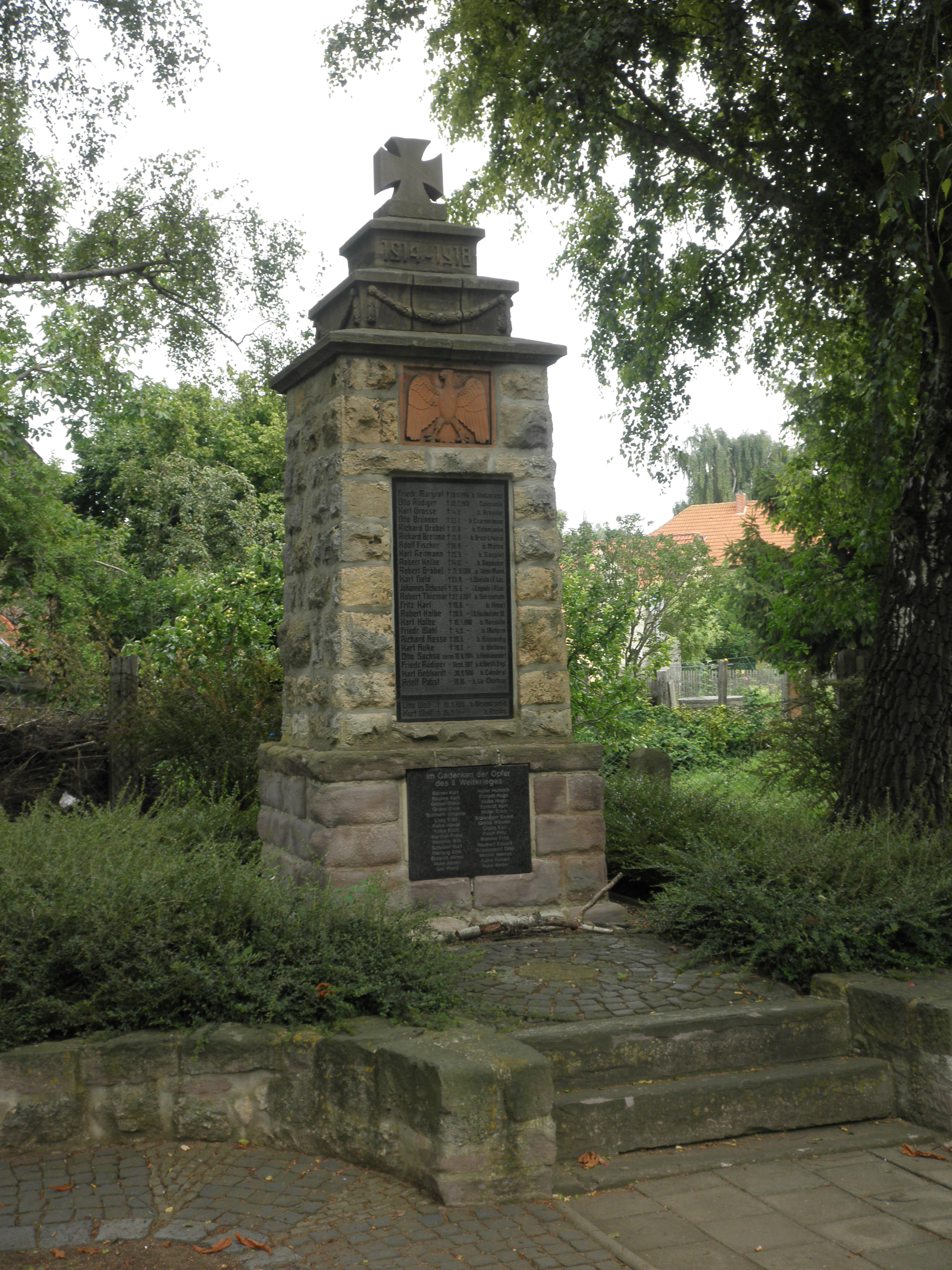
War Monument in Borxleben
