= Silberhausen =

- Ortsteil of Dingelstädt
- Coat of arms
- Interactive map of Silberhausen
- Location within Germany Location within Thuringia
- Coordinates: 51°18′34″N 10°20′21″E
- Country: Germany
- State: Thuringia
- District: Eichsfeld
- Town: Dingelstädt

Area
  - Total: 10.31 km^{2} (3.98 sq mi)
- Elevation: 320 m (1,050 ft)

Population (2017-12-31)
  - Total: 612
  - Density: 59.4/km^{2} (154/sq mi)
- Time zone: UTC+01:00 (CET)
  - Summer (DST): UTC+02:00 (CEST)
- Postal codes: 37351
- Dialling codes: 036075
- Vehicle registration: EIC

Silberhausen (German pronunciation: [zɪlbɐˈhaʊzn̩]) is a village and a former municipality in the district of Eichsfeld in Thuringia, Germany. Since 1 January 2019, it is part of the town Dingelstädt.
