= Hemleben =

- Ortsteil of An der Schmücke
- Interactive map of Hemleben
- Location within Germany Location within Thuringia
- Coordinates: 51°15′21″N 11°13′28″E
- Country: Germany
- State: Thuringia
- District: Kyffhäuserkreis
- Town: An der Schmücke

Area
  - Total: 7.33 km^{2} (2.83 sq mi)
- Elevation: 165 m (541 ft)

Population (2017-12-31)
  - Total: 225
  - Density: 30.7/km^{2} (79.5/sq mi)
- Time zone: UTC+01:00 (CET)
  - Summer (DST): UTC+02:00 (CEST)
- Postal codes: 06577
- Dialling codes: 034673
- Vehicle registration: KYF

Hemleben (German pronunciation: [ˈhɛmˌleːbn̩]) is a village and a former municipality in the district Kyffhäuserkreis, in Thuringia, Germany. On 1 January 2019, it became a district of the town of An der Schmücke.
