= Ernst Ranke =

German Protestant theologian

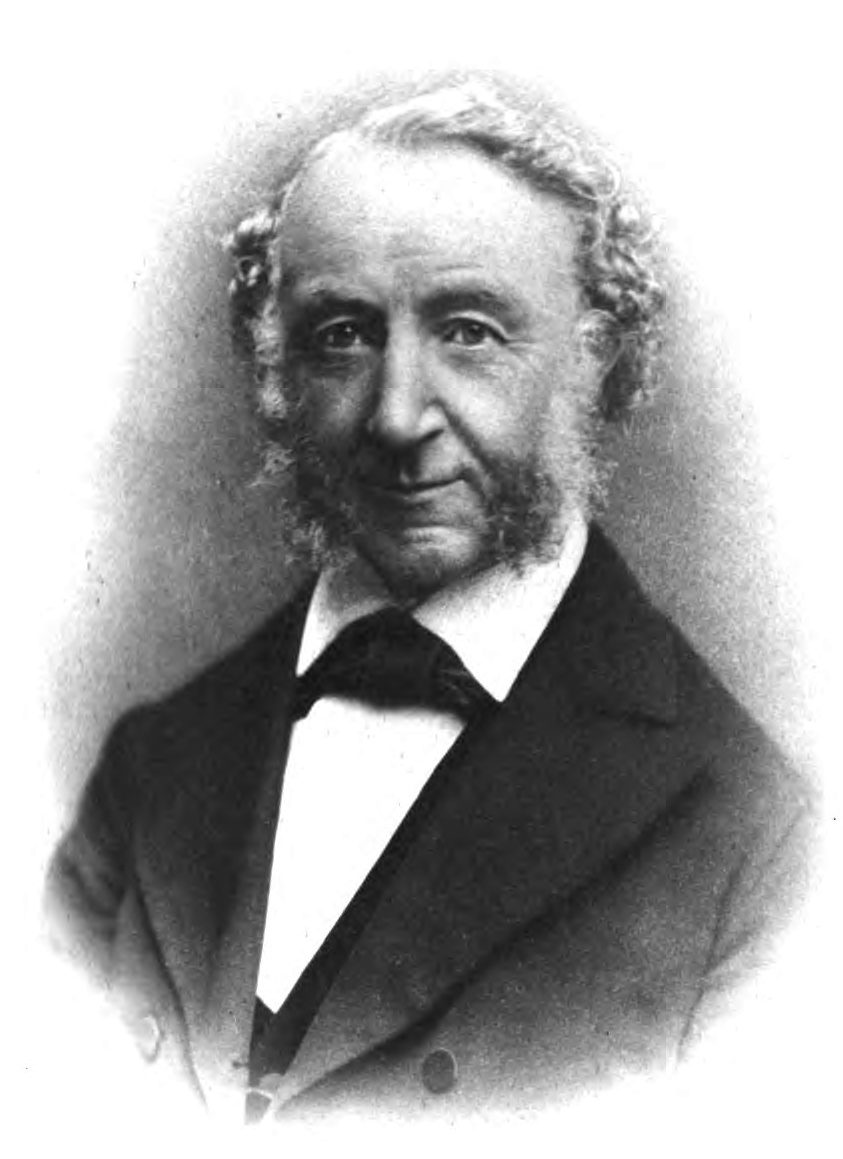
Ernst Ranke – German theologian, 1886

Ernst Constantin Ranke (10 September 1814 – 30 July 1888) was a German Protestant theologian; since 1850, a professor of church history. He was the brother of historian Leopold von Ranke (1795–1886), theologian Friedrich Heinrich Ranke (1798–1876) and philologist Karl Ferdinand Ranke (1802–1876).

== Biography ==
He studied theology in Leipzig, Berlin and Bonn, and later became a pastor in the town of Buchau. From 1850 onward, he was a full professor of theology at Marburg University, where he taught classes in church history and New Testament exegesis. In 1865/1866 he served as university rector.

He was a councillor of the Lutheran consistory with great impact to the issues of the Church of Hesse-Cassel. He wrote poems and published translations of the Bible and books of songs.

== Principal works ==
- Das kirchliche Perikopensystem aus den ältesten Urkunden der Römischen Liturgie (Berlin, 1847).
- Das Buch Tobias, metrisch übersetzt (Bayreuth, 1847); The Book of Tobit, translated metric.
- Kritische Zusammenstellung der... neunen Perikopenkreise (Berlin, 1850).
- Specimen codicis Novi Testamenti Fuldensis (Marburg, 1860).
- Codex Fuldensis : Novum Testamentum Latine interprete Hieronymo (Marburg, 1868).
- Fragmenta versionis sacrarum scripturarum Latinae Antehieronymianae e codice manuscripto (1868).

=== Poems ===
- Gedichte, dem Vaterland gewidme (1848); "Poems, dedicated to the homeland".
- An das deutsche Volk, Ged (1848);
- Carmina academica (Marburg, 1866);
- Lieder aus grossen Zeit (1872);
- Horae Lyricae (Bécs, 1874);
- Die Schlacht im Teutoburger Walde (Marburg, 1876); "The Battle of Teutonburg Forest".
- Rhythmica: Praeit Hugonis Grotii effigies (Bécs, 1881);
- De Laude Nivis (Marburg, 1886).
