= Lossa, Finne =

- Ortsteil of Finne
- Interactive map of Lossa, Finne
- Location within Germany Location within Saxony-Anhalt
- Coordinates: 51°13′N 11°25′E
- Country: Germany
- State: Saxony-Anhalt
- District: Burgenlandkreis
- Town: Finne

Area
  - Total: 16.05 km^{2} (6.20 sq mi)
- Elevation: 308 m (1,010 ft)

Population (2011)
  - Total: 780
  - Density: 49/km^{2} (130/sq mi)
- Time zone: UTC+01:00 (CET)
  - Summer (DST): UTC+02:00 (CEST)
- Postal codes: 06647
- Dialling codes: 036377
- Vehicle registration: BLK
- Website: www.vgem-finne.de

Lossa (German pronunciation: [ˈlɔsa]) is a village and a former municipality in the Burgenlandkreis district, in Saxony-Anhalt, Germany. Since 1 July 2009, it is part of the municipality Finne.
