= Bottendorf =

District in Waldeck-Frankenberg, Hesse, Germany

Coordinates: 51.028611°N 8.812778°E

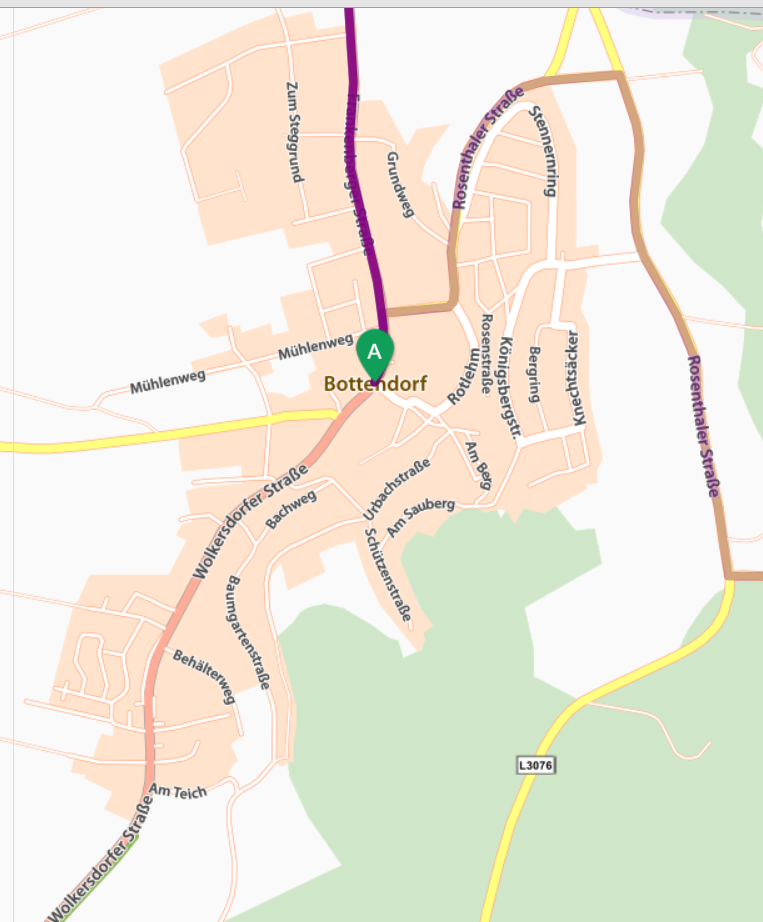
Street Map

Bottendorf is a district in the Gemeinde of Burgwald, located in Waldeck-Frankenberg, Hesse, Germany. According to the 2011 census, the population is roughly 1,950 individuals. With an area of 1.53 km^{2}, the population density of Bottendorf is 1,274/km^{2}.
