= Kreuzebra =

- Ortsteil of Dingelstädt
- Coat of arms
- Interactive map of Kreuzebra
- Location within Germany Location within Thuringia
- Coordinates: 51°20′31″N 10°15′27″E
- Country: Germany
- State: Thuringia
- District: Eichsfeld
- Town: Dingelstädt

Area
  - Total: 13.01 km^{2} (5.02 sq mi)
- Elevation: 420 m (1,380 ft)

Population (2017-12-31)
  - Total: 716
  - Density: 55.0/km^{2} (143/sq mi)
- Time zone: UTC+01:00 (CET)
  - Summer (DST): UTC+02:00 (CEST)
- Postal codes: 37351
- Dialling codes: 036075
- Vehicle registration: EIC

Kreuzebra (German pronunciation: [ˈkʁɔʏtsˌʔeːbʁa]) is a village and a former municipality in the district of Eichsfeld in Thuringia, Germany. Since 1 January 2019, it is part of the town Dingelstädt.
