= Kefferhausen =

- Ortsteil of Dingelstädt
- Coat of arms
- Interactive map of Kefferhausen
- Location within Germany Location within Thuringia
- Coordinates: 51°18′46″N 10°17′6″E
- Country: Germany
- State: Thuringia
- District: Eichsfeld
- Town: Dingelstädt

Area
  - Total: 10.39 km^{2} (4.01 sq mi)
- Elevation: 375 m (1,230 ft)

Population (2017-12-31)
  - Total: 723
  - Density: 69.6/km^{2} (180/sq mi)
- Time zone: UTC+01:00 (CET)
  - Summer (DST): UTC+02:00 (CEST)
- Postal codes: 37351
- Dialling codes: 036075
- Vehicle registration: EIC
- Website: www.kefferhausen.de

Kefferhausen (German pronunciation: [kɛfɐˈhaʊzn̩]) is a village and a former municipality in the district of Eichsfeld in Thuringia, Germany. Since 1 January 2019, it is part of the town Dingelstädt.
