= Donndorf =

- Ortsteil of Roßleben-Wiehe
- Coat of arms
- Interactive map of Donndorf
- Location within Germany Location within Thuringia
- Coordinates: 51°17′34.65″N 11°22′15.7″E
- Country: Germany
- State: Thuringia
- District: Kyffhäuserkreis
- Town: Roßleben-Wiehe
- Subdivisions: 2

Area
  - Total: 11.54 km^{2} (4.46 sq mi)
- Elevation: 120 m (390 ft)

Population (2017-12-31)
  - Total: 783
  - Density: 67.9/km^{2} (176/sq mi)
- Time zone: UTC+01:00 (CET)
  - Summer (DST): UTC+02:00 (CEST)
- Postal codes: 06571
- Dialling codes: 034672
- Vehicle registration: KYF

Donndorf (German pronunciation: [ˈdɔnˌdɔʁf]) is a village and a former municipality in the district Kyffhäuserkreis, in Thuringia, Germany. Since 1 January 2019, it is part of the town Roßleben-Wiehe.
