= Dingelstädt =

- Town
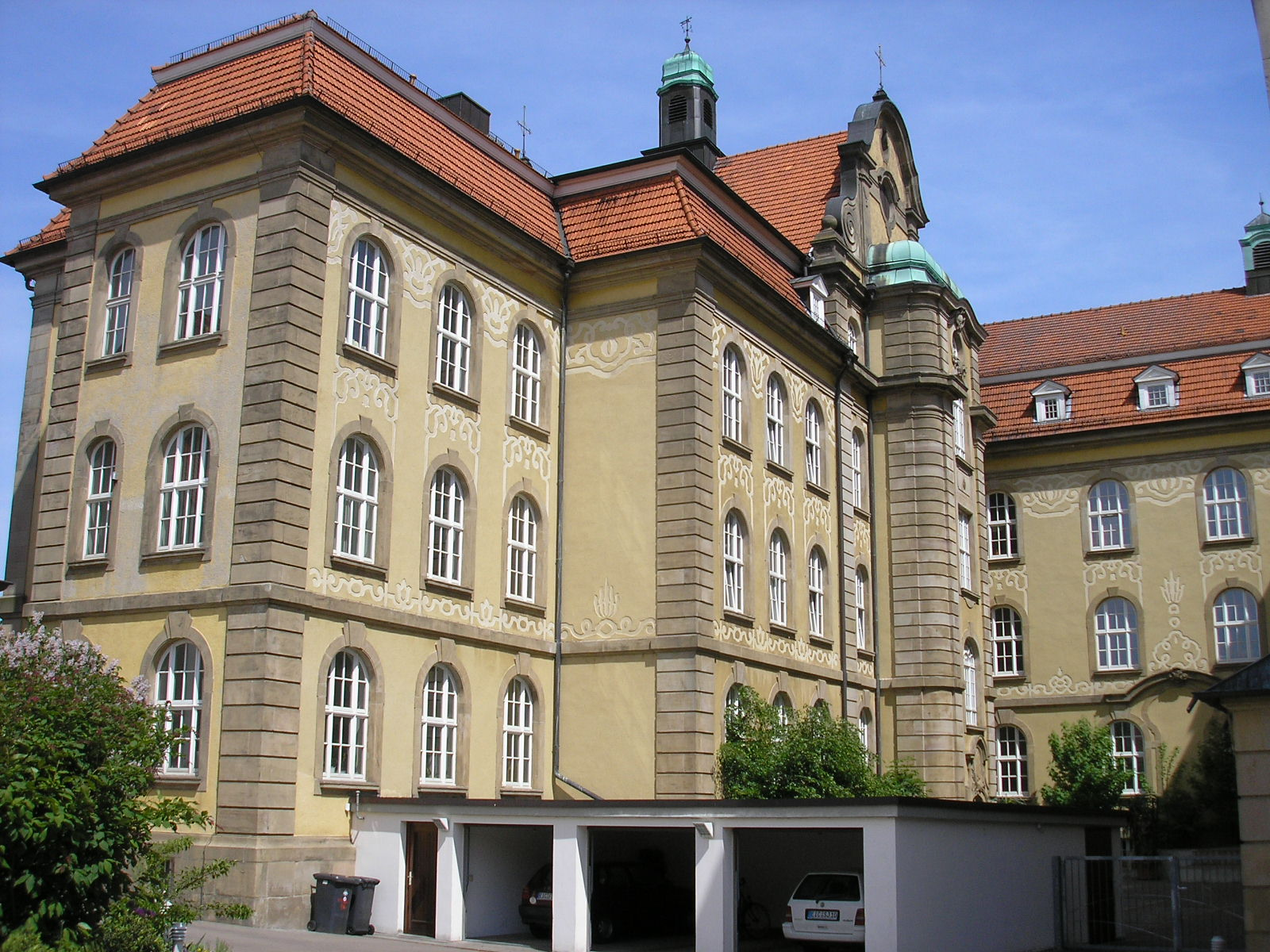
- Gymnasium in Dingelstädt

- Coat of arms

- Location of Dingelstädt within Eichsfeld district
- Interactive map of Dingelstädt
- Location within Germany Location within Thuringia
- Coordinates: 51°18′56″N 10°19′10″E
- Country: Germany
- State: Thuringia
- District: Eichsfeld

Government
  - Mayor (2019–25): Andreas Karl Fernkorn (CDU)

Area
  - Total: 118.63 km^{2} (45.80 sq mi)
- Elevation: 335 m (1,099 ft)

Population (2025-12-31)
  - Total: 12,204
  - Density: 102.87/km^{2} (266.44/sq mi)
- Time zone: UTC+01:00 (CET)
  - Summer (DST): UTC+02:00 (CEST)
- Postal codes: 37351
- Dialling codes: 036075
- Vehicle registration: EIC, HIG, WBS
- Website: www.dingelstaedt.de

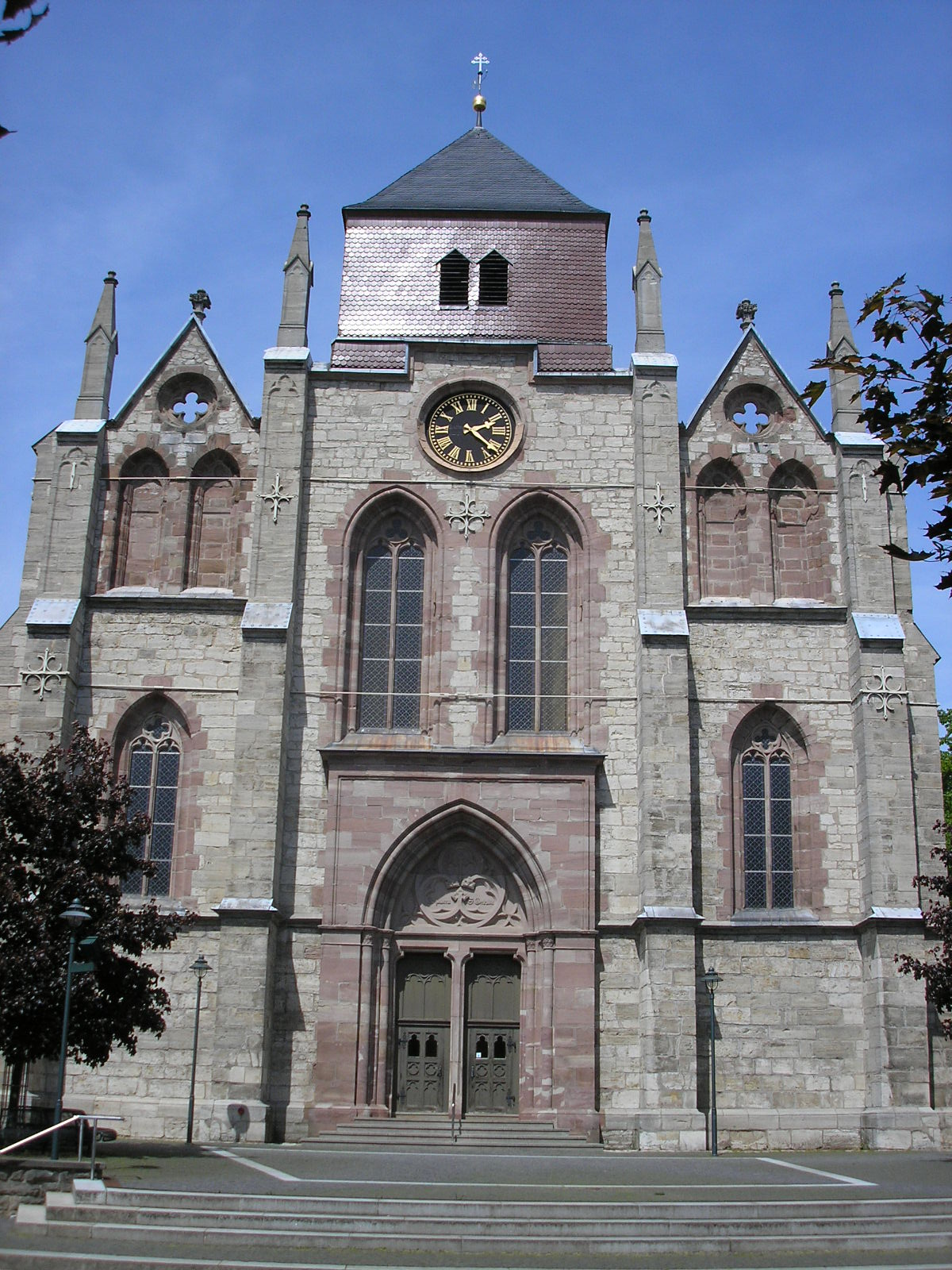
Church in Dingelstädt

Dingelstädt (German pronunciation: [ˈdɪŋl̩ˌʃtɛt]) is a town in the district of Eichsfeld in Thuringia, Germany. It is situated on the upper course of the river Unstrut, 8 km (5 mi) south of Leinefelde-Worbis and 15 km (9 mi) northwest of Mühlhausen. The former municipalities Helmsdorf, Kefferhausen, Kreuzebra and Silberhausen were merged into Dingelstädt in January 2019. In January 2023 Dingelstädt absorbed the villages Bickenriede and Zella from the former municipality Anrode, and Beberstedt and Hüpstedt from the former municipality Dünwald. In January 2024 it absorbed the village Struth from the former municipality Rodeberg.

== Museums ==
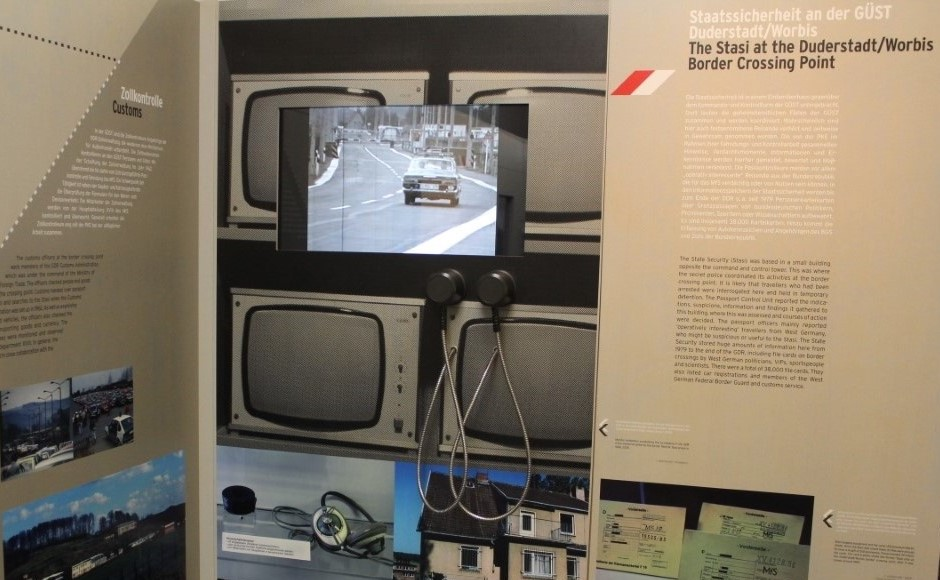
All the information in the museum's exhibition is displayed in both German and English.

The Borderland Museum Eichsfeld is a history museum a few miles away from Dingelstädt which deals with the German division and the GDR. Its grounds also include a hiking trail along the former Iron Curtain.

== People ==
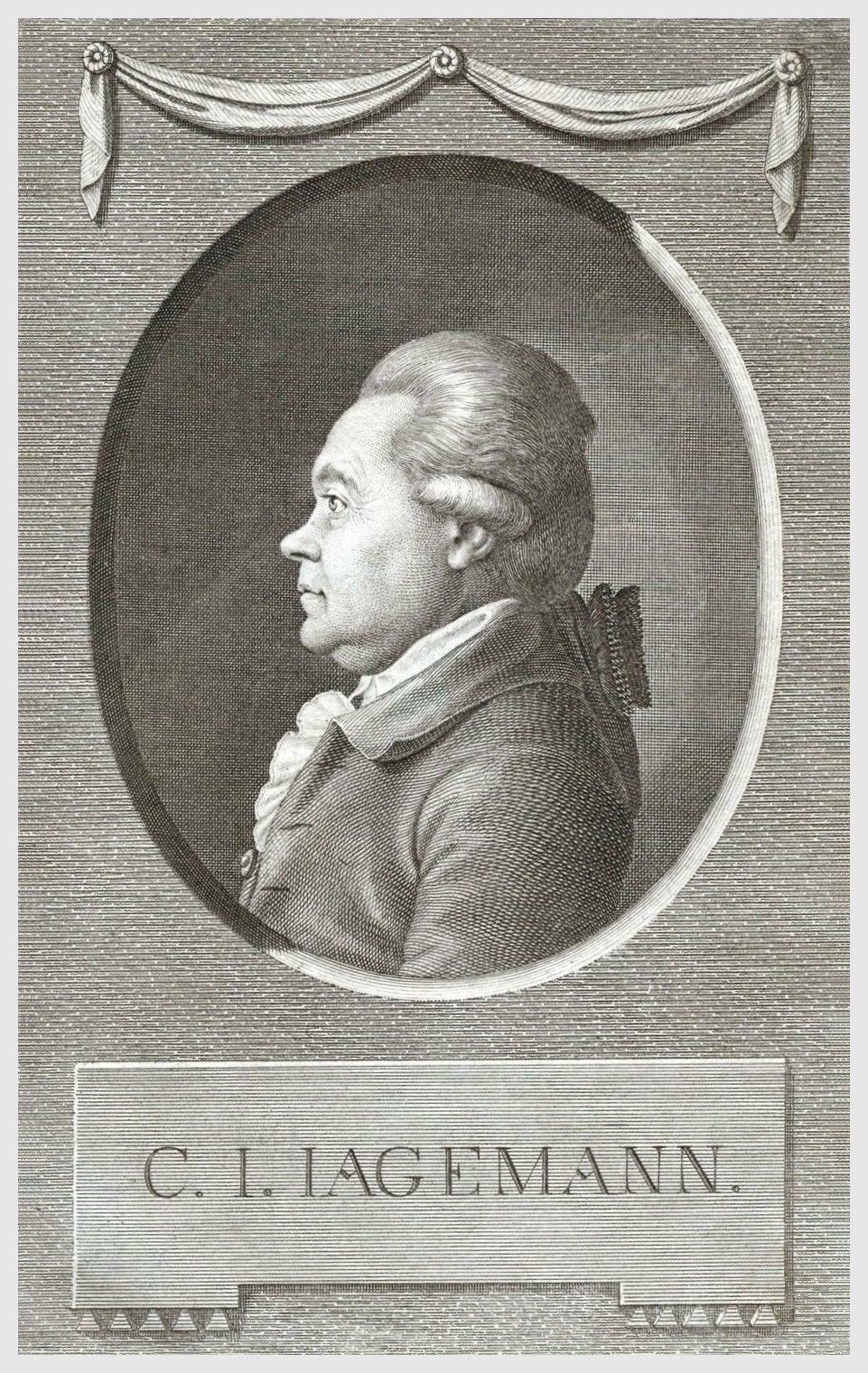
Christian Joseph Jagemann

- Christian Joseph Jagemann (1735–1804), scholar, court counselor and librarian
- Anton Thraen, (1843–1902), the German astronomer, minister and native of Holungen died in Dingelstädt
  - Michael Robert Rhein (*1964), lead singer of the medieval rock band In Extremo.

== International relations ==
Dingelstädt is twinned with:

- Jarosław in Poland (since 2001)
- Felsberg in Germany
- Wenden in Germany
