= Nausitz =

- Ortsteil of Roßleben-Wiehe
- Interactive map of Nausitz
- Location within Germany Location within Thuringia
- Coordinates: 51°18′54″N 11°20′17″E
- Country: Germany
- State: Thuringia
- District: Kyffhäuserkreis
- Town: Roßleben-Wiehe

Area
  - Total: 3.43 km^{2} (1.32 sq mi)
- Elevation: 125 m (410 ft)

Population (2017-12-31)
  - Total: 169
  - Density: 49.3/km^{2} (128/sq mi)
- Time zone: UTC+01:00 (CET)
  - Summer (DST): UTC+02:00 (CEST)
- Postal codes: 06571
- Dialling codes: 0 34 66
- Vehicle registration: KYF

Nausitz (German pronunciation: [ˈnaʊzɪts]) is a village and a former municipality in the district Kyffhäuserkreis, in Thuringia, Germany. Since 1 January 2019, it is part of the town Roßleben-Wiehe.
