= Gorsleben =

- Ortsteil of An der Schmücke
- Coat of arms
- Interactive map of Gorsleben
- Location within Germany Location within Thuringia
- Coordinates: 51°16′34″N 11°10′58″E
- Country: Germany
- State: Thuringia
- District: Kyffhäuserkreis
- Town: An der Schmücke

Area
  - Total: 10.81 km^{2} (4.17 sq mi)
- Elevation: 130 m (430 ft)

Population (2017-12-31)
  - Total: 498
  - Density: 46.1/km^{2} (119/sq mi)
- Time zone: UTC+01:00 (CET)
  - Summer (DST): UTC+02:00 (CEST)
- Postal codes: 06577
- Dialling codes: 0 34 673
- Vehicle registration: KYF

Gorsleben (German pronunciation: [ˈɡɔʁsˌleːbn̩]) is a village and a former municipality in the district Kyffhäuserkreis, in Thuringia, Germany. Since 1 January 2019, it is part of the town An der Schmücke.
