= Thuringian Basin =

Landscape in Germany

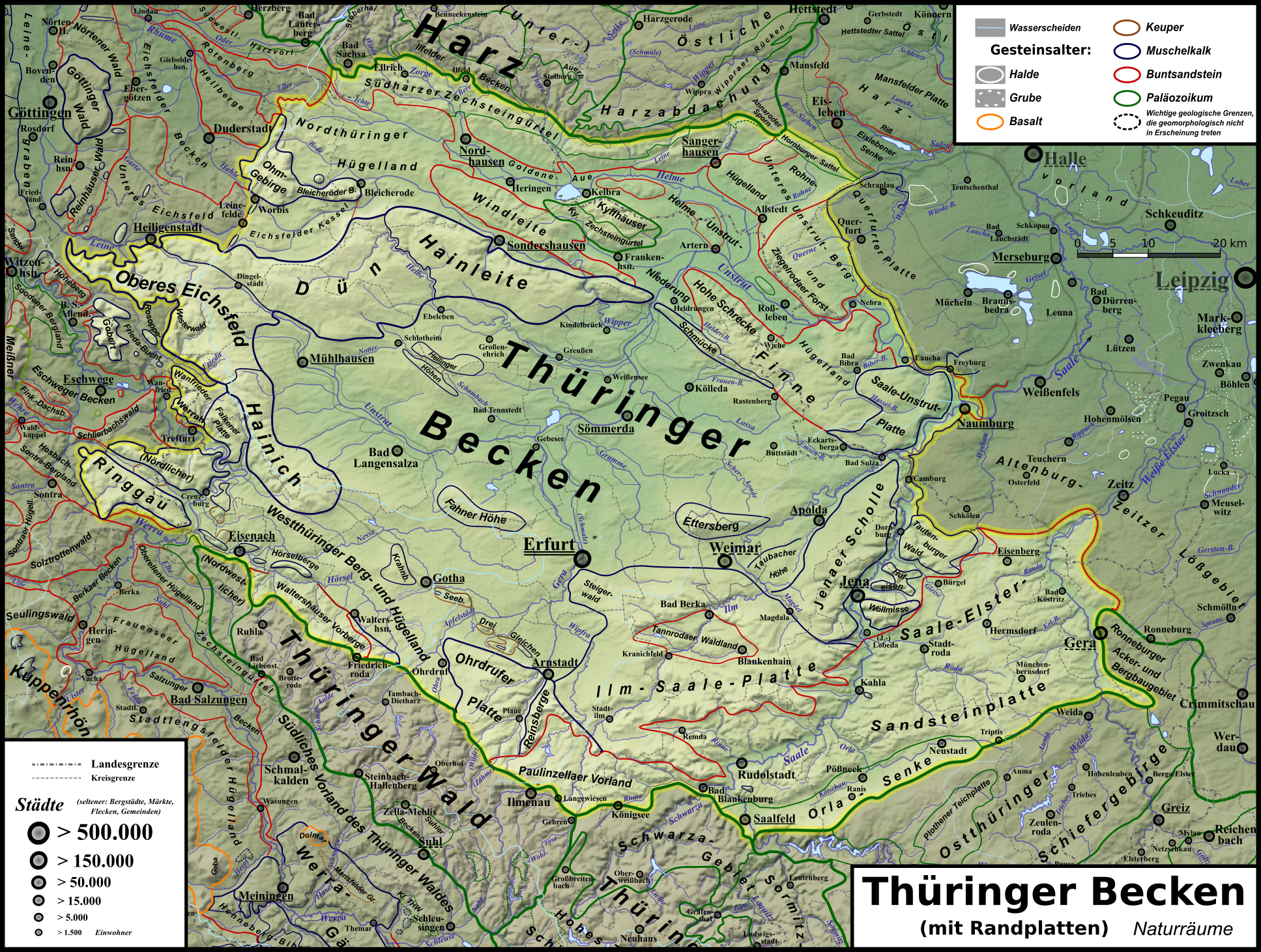
The Thuringian Basin ("Thüringer Becken")

The Thuringian Basin (German: Thüringer Becken, pronounced [ˈtyːʁɪŋɐ ˈbɛkn̩]) is a depression in the central and northwest part of Thuringia in Germany which is crossed by several rivers, the longest of which is the Unstrut. It stretches about 60 kilometres (37 mi) from north to south and around 120 kilometres (75 mi) from east to west. Its height varies from about 150 to 250 m above sea level (NN).

The Basin is surrounded by a wide outer girdle of limestone (Muschelkalk) ridges (including Hainich, Dün, Hainleite, Hohe Schrecke, Schmücke, Finne), and to the southwest by the Thuringian Forest and to the southeast by sharply divided terraces (the Ilm-Saale and Ohrdruf Muschelkalk plateaus, and the Saale-Elster Bunter sandstone plateau). The Thuringian Basin belongs to the triassic period, during which horizontal beds of Bunter sandstone, Muschelkalk and Keuper were laid down. Below those lie the salt and gypsum layers of Magnesian Limestone (Zechstein). In the Cenozoic era the surrounding ridges were uplifted, whilst the Thuringian Basin sank to form a saucer-shaped depression.

The elevation of the Thuringian Basin descends from the south and west to the east. While some of the marginal ridges have the character of low mountain ranges, there are no really noteworthy uplands within it, apart from the Ettersberg and Fahnerscher Höhe.

The Thuringian Basin is dominated by agriculture. Along with the Magdeburg Börde and Leipzig Bay it is one of the richest arable lands in Germany. It was settled in the 8th and 9th century which makes most of the villages and towns in the basin well over 1000 years old. As a result of the fertile countryside, large cities were established very early on in the Basin and on its perimeter (Erfurt and the free imperial city of Mühlhausen).

Other towns in the Thuringian Basin are (year of foundation and year of achieving town status in brackets):

- Schlotheim (974/1277)
- Ebeleben (1198/1928)
- Großenehrich
- Greußen/Clingen (?/1353 and 860/1282) to the north,
- Kindelbrück (775/1291)
- Weißensee (?/1265)
- Sömmerda (876/1350)
- Kölleda (786/1392)
- Rastenberg (1294/1412)
- Buttstädt (?/1331)
- Buttelstedt (780/1454)
- Neumark (1179/1326) to the east,
- Gebesee (786/1638)
- Bad Tennstedt (772/1340)
- Bad Langensalza (932/1212) in the centre
- Gotha (775/?) in the south

Large parts of the Basin in the former Thuringian Landgraviate were held by the House of Wettin from 1264 and, after the 1485 Treaty of Leipzig, formed the Thuringian Circle of the Saxon Electorate. Smaller areas used to belong to the Wettin Ernestine duchies and the County of Schwarzburg; the city of Erfurt was a possession of the Mainz Archbishops. According to the 1815 Congress of Vienna, the Albertine and Mainz lands passed to the Kingdom of Prussia, while the smaller areas on the northern and southern rim formed the Thuringian states.
