= Oldisleben =

- Ortsteil of An der Schmücke
- Coat of arms
- Interactive map of Oldisleben
- Location within Germany Location within Thuringia
- Coordinates: 51°18′32″N 11°10′20″E
- Country: Germany
- State: Thuringia
- District: Kyffhäuserkreis
- Town: An der Schmücke
- Subdivisions: 2

Area
  - Total: 32.52 km^{2} (12.56 sq mi)
- Elevation: 130 m (430 ft)

Population (2017-12-31)
  - Total: 2,196
  - Density: 67.53/km^{2} (174.9/sq mi)
- Time zone: UTC+01:00 (CET)
  - Summer (DST): UTC+02:00 (CEST)
- Postal codes: 06578
- Dialling codes: 034673
- Vehicle registration: KYF

Oldisleben (German pronunciation: [ˈɔldɪsˌleːbn̩]) is a village and a former municipality in the district Kyffhäuserkreis, in Thuringia, Germany. Since 1 January 2019, it is part of the town An der Schmücke.

== History ==
Within the German Empire (1871–1918), Oldisleben was part of the Grand Duchy of Saxe-Weimar-Eisenach.
