= Gehofen =

- Municipality
- Coat of arms

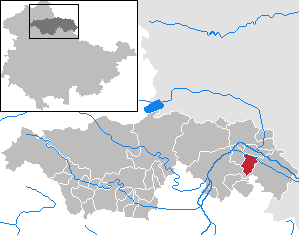
- Location of Gehofen within Kyffhäuserkreis district
- Interactive map of Gehofen
- Location within Germany Location within Thuringia
- Coordinates: 51°19′N 11°19′E
- Country: Germany
- State: Thuringia
- District: Kyffhäuserkreis

Government
  - Mayor (2022–28): Sebastian Koch

Area
  - Total: 13.49 km^{2} (5.21 sq mi)
- Elevation: 125 m (410 ft)

Population (2025-12-31)
  - Total: 599
  - Density: 44.4/km^{2} (115/sq mi)
- Time zone: UTC+01:00 (CET)
  - Summer (DST): UTC+02:00 (CEST)
- Postal codes: 06571
- Dialling codes: 0 34 66
- Vehicle registration: KYF
- Website: www.gehofen.de

Gehofen is a municipality in the district Kyffhäuserkreis, in Thuringia, Germany.

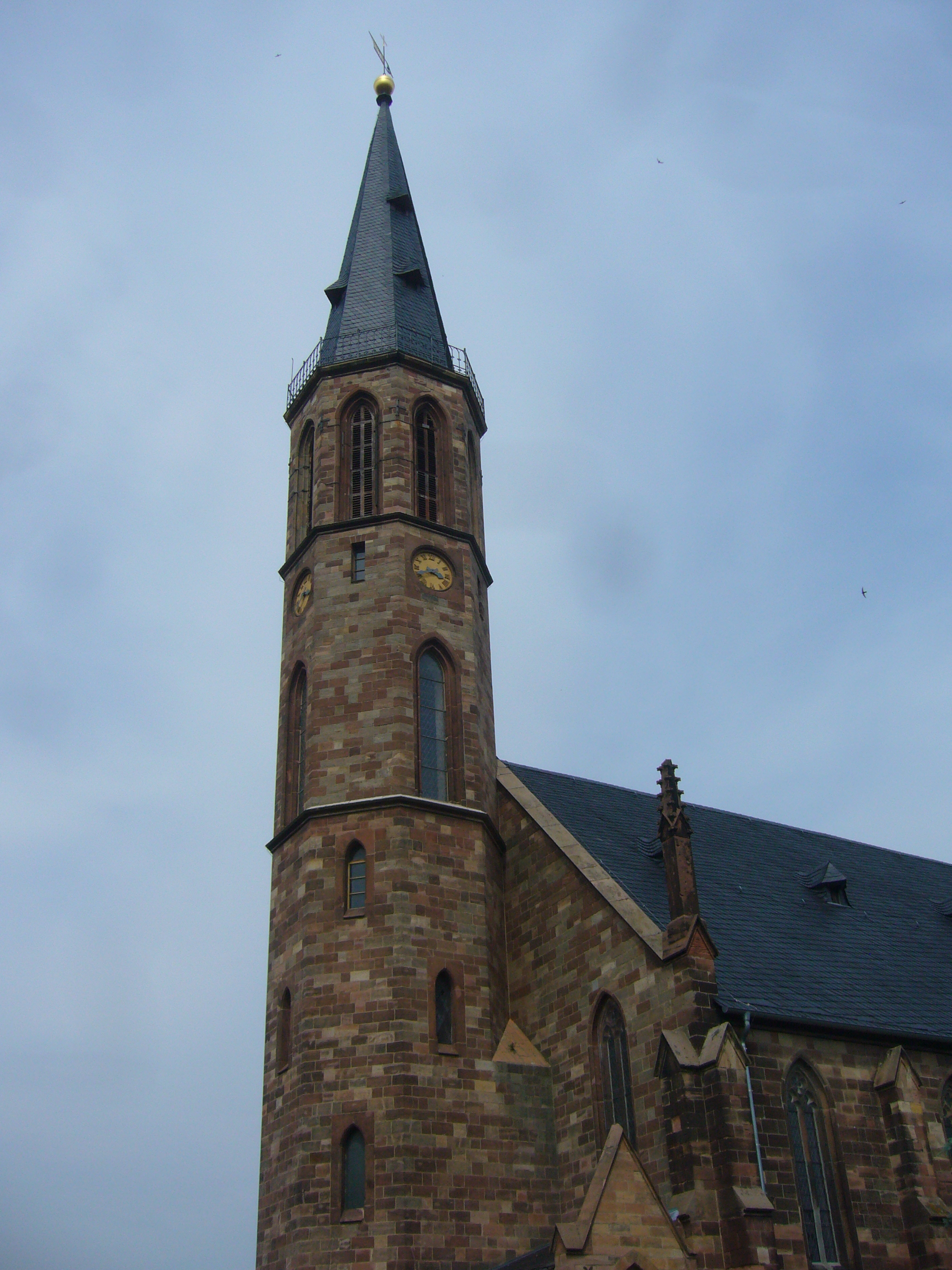
St. John the Baptist Church

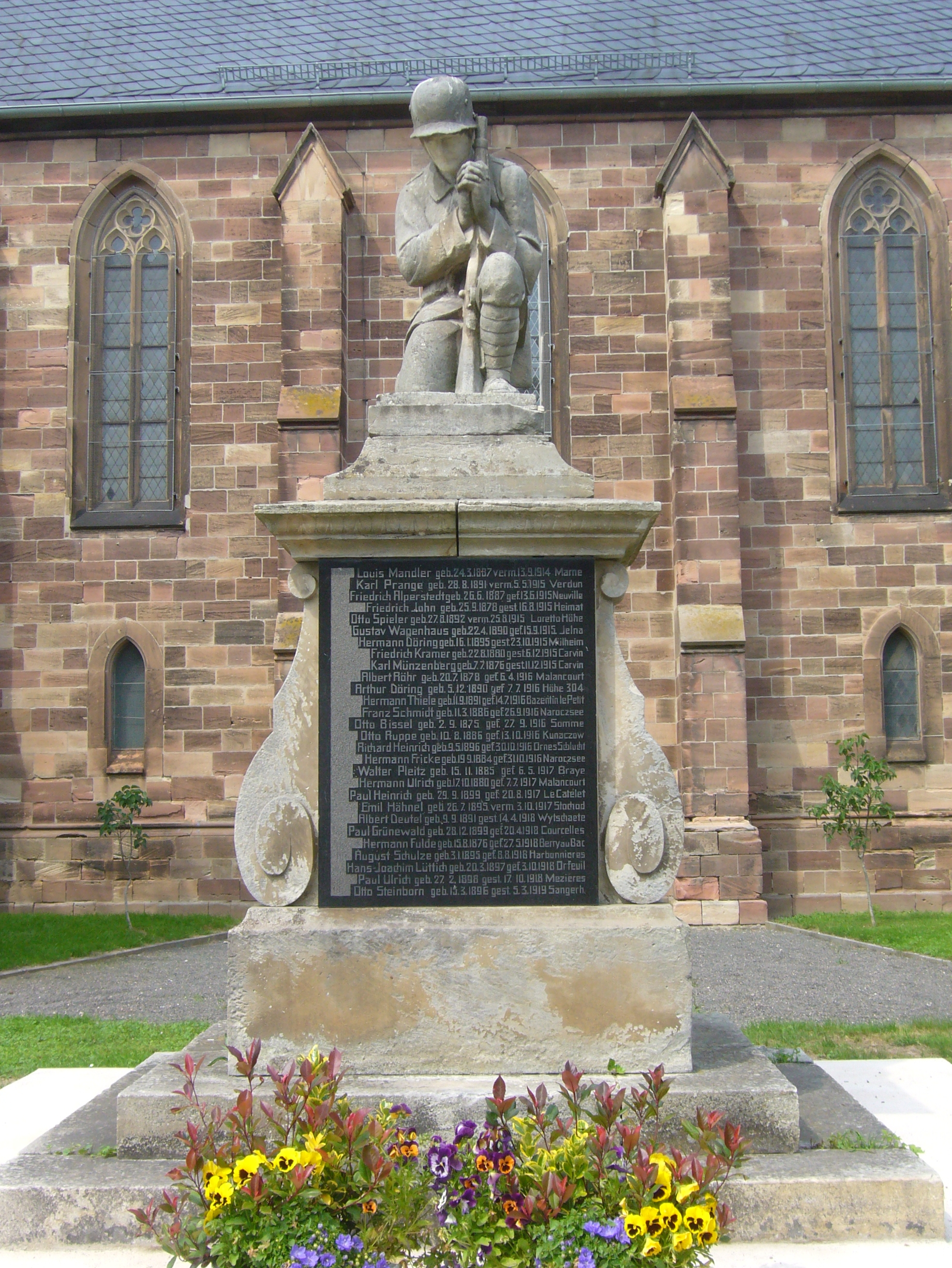
War Memorial

== People from Gehofen ==
- Ernst Albrecht von Eberstein (1605-1677), Saxon Field Marshal
