= Reinsdorf, Thuringia =

Reinsdorf
- Municipality
- Coat of arms

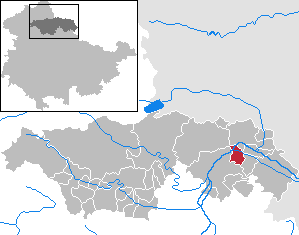
- Location of Reinsdorf within Kyffhäuserkreis district
- Interactive map of Reinsdorf
- Location within Germany Location within Thuringia
- Coordinates: 51°20′N 11°16′E
- Country: Germany
- State: Thuringia
- District: Kyffhäuserkreis

Government
  - Mayor (2022–28): Olaf Schmidt

Area
  - Total: 11.17 km^{2} (4.31 sq mi)
- Elevation: 130 m (430 ft)

Population (2025-12-31)
  - Total: 672
  - Density: 60.2/km^{2} (156/sq mi)
- Time zone: UTC+01:00 (CET)
  - Summer (DST): UTC+02:00 (CEST)
- Postal codes: 06556
- Dialling codes: 0 34 66
- Vehicle registration: KYF

Reinsdorf (German pronunciation: [ˈʁaɪnsdɔʁf]) is a municipality in the district Kyffhäuserkreis, in Thuringia, Germany.
