= Hauteroda =

- Ortsteil of An der Schmücke
- Interactive map of Hauteroda
- Location within Germany Location within Thuringia
- Coordinates: 51°15′56″N 11°16′40″E
- Country: Germany
- State: Thuringia
- District: Kyffhäuserkreis
- Town: An der Schmücke

Area
  - Total: 12.66 km^{2} (4.89 sq mi)
- Elevation: 180 m (590 ft)

Population (2017-12-31)
  - Total: 501
  - Density: 39.6/km^{2} (102/sq mi)
- Time zone: UTC+01:00 (CET)
  - Summer (DST): UTC+02:00 (CEST)
- Postal codes: 06577
- Dialling codes: 034673
- Vehicle registration: KYF
- Website: www.hauteroda.net

Hauteroda (German pronunciation: [haʊtəˈʁoːda]) is a village and a former municipality in the district Kyffhäuserkreis, in Thuringia, Germany. Since 1 January 2019, it is part of the town An der Schmücke.
