= Oberheldrungen =

- Municipality
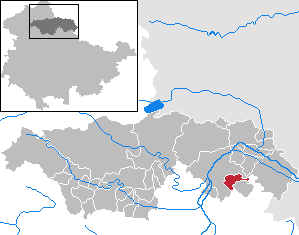
- Location of Oberheldrungen within Kyffhäuserkreis district
- Interactive map of Oberheldrungen
- Location within Germany Location within Thuringia
- Coordinates: 51°16′45″N 11°14′38″E
- Country: Germany
- State: Thuringia
- District: Kyffhäuserkreis
- Subdivisions: 2 Ortsteile

Government
  - Mayor (2022–28): Susann Weber

Area
  - Total: 12.46 km^{2} (4.81 sq mi)
- Elevation: 150 m (490 ft)

Population (2025-12-31)
  - Total: 711
  - Density: 57.1/km^{2} (148/sq mi)
- Time zone: UTC+01:00 (CET)
  - Summer (DST): UTC+02:00 (CEST)
- Postal codes: 06577
- Dialling codes: 034673
- Vehicle registration: KYF
- Website: Offizielle Seite

Oberheldrungen (German pronunciation: [ˈoːbɐˌhɛldʁʊŋən]) is a municipality in the district Kyffhäuserkreis, in Thuringia, Germany.
