= Unstrut =

River in Germany

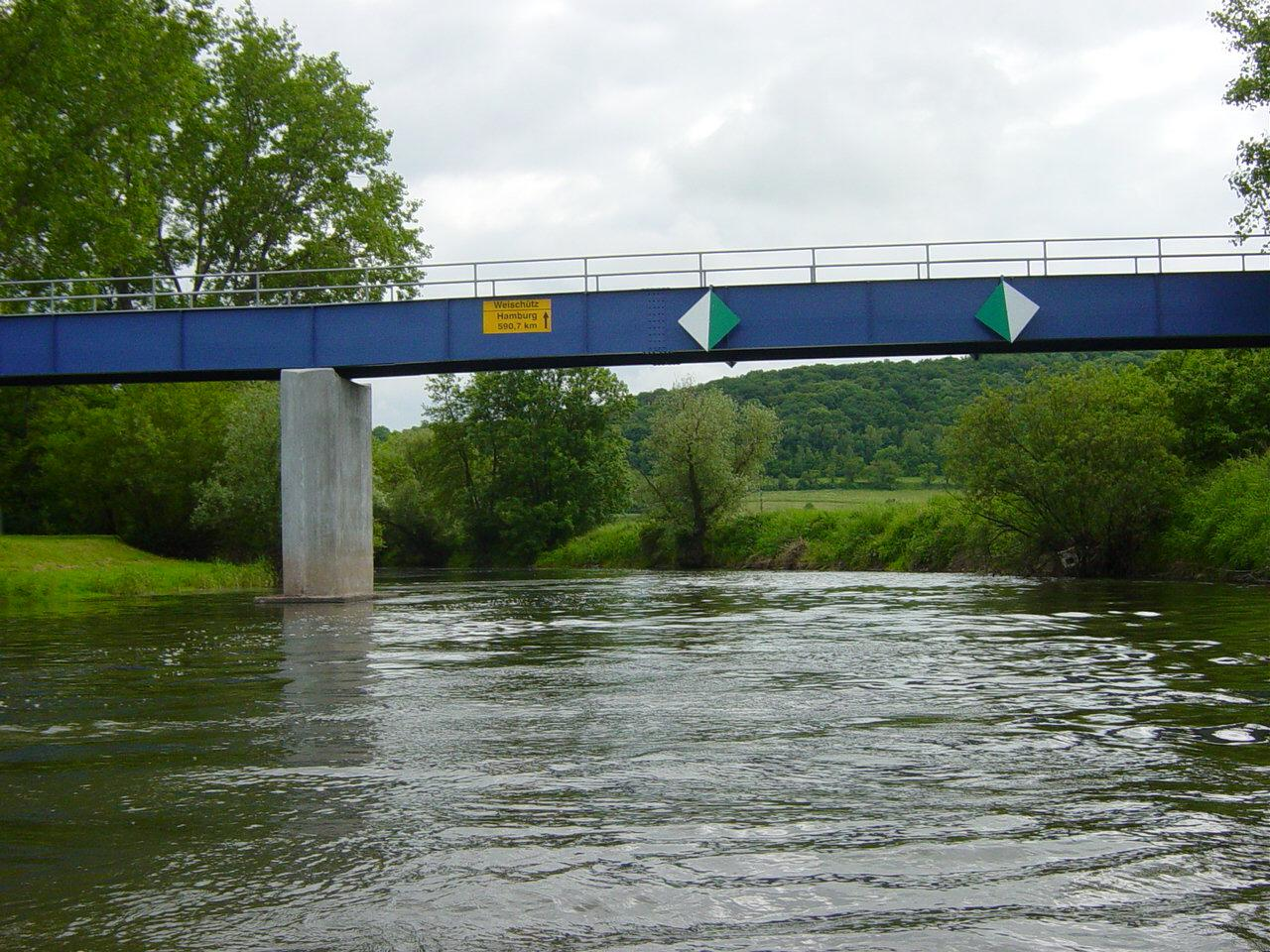
- Bridge over the Unstrut near Weischütz

Location
- Country: Germany
- States: Thuringia; Saxony-Anhalt

Physical characteristics
- Source: west of Kefferhausen
  - location: Thuringia
  - coordinates: 51.31623°N 10.2763°E
  - elevation: 400 m (1,300 ft)
- Mouth: Saale, near Naumburg
  - location: Saxony-Anhalt
  - coordinates: 51°10′33″N 11°48′7″E
  - elevation: 102 m (335 ft)
- Length: 192 km (119 mi)
- Basin size: 6,364.2 km^{2} (2,457.2 sq mi)

Basin features
- Progression: Saale→ Elbe→ North Sea
- Tributaries
  - left: Notter; Wipper; Helme
  - right: Salza; Gera; Lossa

The Unstrut (German pronunciation: [ˈʊnʃtʁuːt] or [ˈʊnstʁuːt]) is a river in Germany and a left tributary of the Saale.

The Unstrut originates in northern Thuringia near Dingelstädt (west of Kefferhausen in the Eichsfeld area) and its catchment area is the whole of the Thuringian Basin. It breaks out of the basin through the Thuringian Gate west of Heldrungen and, in its lower reaches, flows through Saxony-Anhalt before emptying into the Saale near Naumburg. The total length of the Unstrut is 192 kilometres (119 mi). Towns along the Unstrut include Mühlhausen, Sömmerda, Bad Frankenhausen, Artern, Roßleben, and Freyburg. The main tributaries of the Unstrut are the Gera, Wipper, Helme, and Lossa.

The countryside around the Saale and Unstrut rivers forms the wine-growing region of Saale-Unstrut. The well-known brand of sparkling wine, Rotkäppchen ("Little Red Riding Hood") is produced in the cellars of Freyburg.

== Name ==
Old High German Strödu means 'boggy thicket' and un- is a prefix to intensify the meaning, and so the Unstrut region was a very swampy area. In 575, the river was attested as the Onestrudis, in the 7th century it was referred to as the Unestrude, and in 994 as the Vnstruod.

== History ==
In 531, according to the Decem Libri of Gregory of Tours, the decisive Battle of the Unstrut River between the Franconians and Thuringians took place along the Unstrut, which resulted in the destruction and annexation of the early medieval Thuringian kingdom by the Frankish empire. In 933 the German king Henry I fought, after a ten-year truce, against a Hungarian army in the Battle of Riade, a place near the Unstrut, but which is now unknown. His victory led to a period of peace, until the Hungarians returned in 955 and were defeated again. One of his favourite places was Memleben on the Unstrut, where a royal residence, a so-called Pfalz, palatium or villa regia, was built. He died there in 936, as did his son, Otto I, in 973. A monastery was built there in the next years, becoming one of the most important in the German realm for a short time. Its ruins may still be seen; the exact location of the palatium is not known any more.

Due to its marshy character, the Unstrut was not navigable for ships for a long time. Finally, in the years 1790–94, the river was made navigable on the orders of the Elector of Saxony. It became an important shipping lane for a century; in particular, sandstone and limestone were shipped. From 1889, when the Unstrut Railway (Unstrutbahn), was built alongside the river, the significance of the waterway as a transport route was much reduced. Although the Unstrut wine-growing region, with an area of 300 hectares (740 acres), is one of the smallest, it is quite well known.

== Sights ==
- Historic town of Mühlhausen
- Ruined castle of Wendelstein
- Ruined abbey of Memleben
- Neuenburg Castle at Freyburg

== See also ==
- List of rivers of Thuringia
- List of rivers of Saxony-Anhalt
