= Heldrungen =

- Ortsteil of An der Schmücke
- Coat of arms
- Interactive map of Heldrungen
- Location within Germany Location within Thuringia
- Coordinates: 51°18′5″N 11°13′0″E
- Country: Germany
- State: Thuringia
- District: Kyffhäuserkreis
- Town: An der Schmücke
- Subdivisions: 2

Area
  - Total: 23.27 km^{2} (8.98 sq mi)
- Elevation: 128 m (420 ft)

Population (2017-12-31)
  - Total: 2,207
  - Density: 94.84/km^{2} (245.6/sq mi)
- Time zone: UTC+01:00 (CET)
  - Summer (DST): UTC+02:00 (CEST)
- Postal codes: 06577
- Dialling codes: 034673
- Vehicle registration: KYF

Heldrungen (German pronunciation: [ˈhɛldʁʊŋən]) is a town and a former municipality in the Kyffhäuserkreis district, Thuringia, Germany. Since 1 January 2019, it is part of the town An der Schmücke.

Nearby rivers are the Unstrut and the Wipper.

It is known for its fortification with two water ditches, four vauban bastions and five rondells. In the center of the fortification is a Renaissance castle, which was built from 1512 to 1518. Today, the castle is used as a youth hostel.

== Notable people ==
Notable people that were born or lived in Heldrungen include:

- Ferdinand T. Yahr (1834–1910), American politician
