= List of towns in Thuringia =

An alphabetical list of towns in German state of Thuringia.

== In alphabetical order ==
Town	Inhabitants (2005-12-31)	District
Altenburg	37,781	Altenburger Land
Apolda	24,500	Weimarer Land
Arnstadt	25,722	Ilm-Kreis
Artern	6,201	Kyffhäuserkreis
Auma	3,203	Greiz
Bad Berka	7,702	Weimarer Land
Bad Blankenburg	7,498	Saalfeld-Rudolstadt
Bad Colberg-Heldburg	2,244	Hildburghausen
Bad Frankenhausen	8,775	Kyffhäuserkreis
Bad Köstritz	3,964	Greiz
Bad Langensalza	18,689	Unstrut-Hainich-Kreis
Bad Liebenstein	4,102	Wartburgkreis
Bad Lobenstein	6,905	Saale-Orla-Kreis
Bad Salzungen	16,504	Wartburgkreis
Bad Sulza	3,065	Weimarer Land
Bad Tennstedt	2,665	Unstrut-Hainich-Kreis
Berga/Elster	3,830	Greiz
Berka/Werra	4,696	Wartburgkreis
Blankenhain	6,840	Weimarer Land
Bleicherode	6,283	Nordhausen
Brotterode	3,010	Schmalkalden-Meiningen
Bürgel	3,304	Saale-Holzland-Kreis
Buttelstedt	1,405	Weimarer Land
Buttstädt	2,655	Sömmerda
Camburg	2,939	Saale-Holzland-Kreis
Clingen	1,117	Kyffhäuserkreis
Creuzburg	2,576	Wartburgkreis
Dingelstädt	4,798	Eichsfeld
Dornburg/Saale	887	Saale-Holzland-Kreis
Ebeleben	3,080	Kyffhäuserkreis
Eisenach	43,727	kreisfrei
Eisenberg	11,424	Saale-Holzland-Kreis
Eisfeld	5,750	Hildburghausen
Ellrich	6,267	Nordhausen
Erfurt	202,844	kreisfrei
Friedrichroda	5,307	Landkreis Gotha
Gebesee	2,319	Sömmerda
Gefell	2,827	Saale-Orla-Kreis
Gehren	3,641	Ilm-Kreis
Geisa	3,393	Wartburgkreis
Gera	103,948	kreisfrei
Gößnitz	4,039	Altenburger Land
Gotha	46,896	Gotha
Gräfenthal	2,692	Saalfeld-Rudolstadt
Greiz	23,764	Greiz
Greußen	3,950	Kyffhäuserkreis
Großbreitenbach	2,895	Ilm-Kreis
Großenehrich	2,890	Kyffhäuserkreis
Heilbad Heiligenstadt	17,153	Eichsfeld
Heldrungen	2,333	Kyffhäuserkreis
Heringen/Helme	2,379	Nordhausen
Hermsdorf	8,609	Saale-Holzland-Kreis
Hildburghausen	12,296	Hildburghausen
Hirschberg	2,569	Saale-Orla-Kreis
Hohenleuben	1,802	Greiz
Ilmenau	26,737	Ilm-Kreis
Jena	102,532	kreisfrei
Kahla	7,425	Saale-Holzland-Kreis
Kaltennordheim	1,871	Wartburgkreis
Kindelbrück	1,918	Sömmerda
Kölleda	5,767	Sömmerda
Königsee	5,497	Saalfeld-Rudolstadt
Kranichfeld	3,717	Weimarer Land
Langewiesen	3,689	Ilm-Kreis
Lauscha	4,017	Landkreis Sonneberg
Lehesten	2,115	Saalfeld-Rudolstadt
Leinefelde-Worbis	20,675	Eichsfeld
Leutenberg	2,509	Saalfeld-Rudolstadt
Lucka	4,475	Altenburger Land
Magdala	2,018	Weimarer Land
Meiningen	21,448	Schmalkalden-Meiningen
Meuselwitz	9,547	Altenburger Land
Mühlhausen/Thüringen	37,285	Unstrut-Hainich-Kreis
Münchenbernsdorf	3,344	Greiz
Neuhaus am Rennweg	5,929	Sonneberg
Neumark	500	Weimarer Land
Neustadt an der Orla	8,851	Saale-Orla-Kreis
Nordhausen	43,594	Nordhausen
Oberhof	1,632	Landkreis Schmalkalden-Meiningen
Oberweißbach	1,645	Landkreis Saalfeld-Rudolstadt
Ohrdruf	6,024	Gotha
Orlamünde	1,286	Saale-Holzland-Kreis
Plaue	1,958	Ilm-Kreis
Pößneck	13,446	Saale-Orla-Kreis
Ranis	1,965	Saale-Orla-Kreis
Rastenberg	2,864	Sömmerda
Remda-Teichel	3,292	Landkreis Saalfeld-Rudolstadt
Römhild	1,951	Hildburghausen
Ronneburg	5,515	Greiz
Roßleben	6,105	Kyffhäuserkreis
Rudolstadt	25,397	Saalfeld-Rudolstadt
Ruhla	6,648	Wartburgkreis
Saalburg-Ebersdorf	4,008	Saale-Orla-Kreis
Saalfeld/Saale	27,918	Saalfeld-Rudolstadt
Schalkau	3,367	Sonneberg
Schkölen	2,895	Saale-Holzland-Kreis
Schleiz	8,941	Saale-Orla-Kreis
Schleusingen	5,769	Landkreis Hildburghausen
Schlotheim	4,141	Unstrut-Hainich-Kreis
Schmalkalden	17,910	Schmalkalden-Meiningen
Schmölln	12,576	Altenburger Land
Sömmerda	20,770	Sömmerda
Sondershausen	21,622	Kyffhäuserkreis
Sonneberg	23,805	Sonneberg
Stadtilm	5,092	Ilm-Kreis
Stadtlengsfeld	2,684	Wartburgkreis
Stadtroda	6,387	Saale-Holzland-Kreis
Steinach	4,650	Sonneberg
Steinbach-Hallenberg	5,727	Schmalkalden-Meiningen
Suhl	42,689	kreisfrei
Tambach-Dietharz	4,352	Gotha
Tanna	4,073	Saale-Orla-Kreis
Themar	3,104	Hildburghausen
Treffurt	6,040	Wartburgkreis
Triptis	4,040	Saale-Orla-Kreis
Ummerstadt	533	Hildburghausen
Vacha	3,861	Wartburgkreis
Waltershausen	11,185	Gotha
Wasungen	3,736	Landkreis Schmalkalden-Meiningen
Weida	8,335	Greiz
Weimar	64,594	kreisfrei
Weißensee	3,674	Sömmerda
Wiehe	2,189	Kyffhäuserkreis
Wurzbach	3,798	Saale-Orla-Kreis
Zella-Mehlis	12,245	Schmalkalden-Meiningen
Zeulenroda-Triebes	17,474	Greiz
Ziegenrück	785	Saale-Orla-Kreis

== By year of becoming town ==
This list contains all towns in the German state Thuringia sorted by the year they became town. Towns with a population of more than 10,000 are bold and towns belonging to another town today are in italics.

12th century

- about 1120 Erfurt
- 1135 Mühlhausen
- 1158 Schkölen
- 1180 Saalfeld
- 1180 Schmalkalden
- 1186 Vacha
- in the 12th century. Gotha

13th century

- 1206 Thamsbrück (Bad Langensalza)
- 1209 Waltershausen
- 1209 Weida
- 1212 Bad Langensalza
- 1213 Creuzburg
- 1219 Bad Frankenhausen
- 1220 Arnstadt
- 1220 Nordhausen
- 1227 Heiligenstadt
- 1230 Jena
- 1230 Meiningen
- 1234 Bürgel
- 1237 Gera
- 1255 Worbis (Leinefelde-Worbis)
- 1256 Altenburg
- 1268 Stadtilm
- 1274 Eisenberg
- 1277 Schlotheim
- 1278 Lobenstein
- 1282 Clingen
- 1283 Eisenach
- 1284 Lobeda (Jena)
- 1286 Remda
- 1288 Magdala
- 1289 Apolda
- 1291 Kindelbrück
- 1292 Ellrich

14th century

- um 1300 Sondershausen
- 1302 Geisa
- 1302 Sparnberg (Hirschberg/Saale)
- 1304 Ronneburg
- 1305 Bad Salzungen
- 1308 Wasungen
- 1310 Berga
- 1313 Saalburg
- 1317 Römhild
- 1317 Themar
- 1320 Lucka
- 1320 Wiehe
- 1323 Artern
- 1323 Bad Blankenburg
- 1323 Eisfeld
- 1324 Hildburghausen
- 1324 Pößneck
- 1325 Neustadt an der Orla
- 1326 Bleicherode
- 1326 Leutenberg
- 1326 Neumark
- 1326 Rudolstadt
- 1326 Stadtlengsfeld
- 1327 Heringen
- 1328 Triptis
- 1328 Ziegenrück
- 1329 Schmölln
- 1331 Auma
- 1331 Buttstädt
- 1333 Kahla
- 1333 Stadtroda
- 1333 Treffurt
- 1340 Bad Tennstedt
- 1341 Ilmenau
- 1343 Dornburg
- 1344 Orlamünde
- 1345 Plaue
- 1348 Ohrdruf
- 1348 Weimar
- 1349 Camburg
- 1349 Sonneberg
- 1350 Blankenhain
- 1350 Sömmerda
- 1353 Bad Sulza
- 1353 Greußen
- 1359 Greiz
- 1362 Schalkau
- 1365 Königsee
- 1381 Ranis
- 1392 Kölleda
- 1394 Heldburg
- 1394 Ummerstadt
- 1397 Hirschberg

15th century

- 1403 Tannroda (Bad Berka)
- 1412 Gräfenthal
- 1412 Rastenberg
- 1412 Schleusingen
- 1414 Bad Berka
- 1417 Teichel (Remda-Teichel)
- 1438 Zeulenroda
- 1454 Buttelstedt
- 1474 Gefell
- 1482 Schleiz
- 1495 Tanna

16th century

- 1527 Suhl
- 1530 Heldrungen
- 1562 Kaltennordheim
- 1597 Friedrichroda

17th century

- 1638 Gebesee
- 1651 Kranichfeld
- 1651 Lehesten

18th century

- 1718 Gößnitz

19th century

- 1847 Berka
- 1855 Gehren
- 1855 Großbreitenbach
- 1855 Langewiesen
- 1859 Dingelstädt
- 1874 Meuselwitz
- 1886 Ruhla
- 1894 Zella-Mehlis

20th century

- 1904 Münchenbernsdorf
- 1919 Triebes (Zeulenroda-Triebes)
- 1920 Steinach
- 1925 Tambach-Dietharz
- 1927 Bad Köstritz
- 1928 Ebeleben
- 1928 Hohenleuben
- 1930 Wurzbach
- 1931 Oberlind (Sonneberg)
- 1932 Oberweißbach
- 1933 Langenberg (Gera)
- 1933 Neuhaus am Rennweg
- 1936 Brotterode
- 1936 Steinbach-Hallenberg
- 1958 Lauscha
- 1959 Bad Liebenstein
- 1969 Hermsdorf
- 1969 Leinefelde
- 1985 Oberhof
- 1999 Roßleben

Date unknown

- Großenehrich
