= Wolferschwenda =

- Ortsteil of Greußen
- Interactive map of Wolferschwenda
- Location within Germany Location within Thuringia
- Coordinates: 51°14′12″N 10°48′10″E
- Country: Germany
- State: Thuringia
- District: Kyffhäuserkreis
- Town: Greußen

Area
  - Total: 4.27 km^{2} (1.65 sq mi)
- Elevation: 275 m (902 ft)

Population (2019-12-31)
  - Total: 139
  - Density: 32.6/km^{2} (84.3/sq mi)
- Time zone: UTC+01:00 (CET)
  - Summer (DST): UTC+02:00 (CEST)
- Postal codes: 99713
- Dialling codes: 036370
- Vehicle registration: KYF

Wolferschwenda (German pronunciation: [ˈvɔlfɐˌʃvɛnda]) is a village and a former municipality in the district Kyffhäuserkreis, in Thuringia, Germany. Since January 2021, it is part of the town Greußen.
