= Großenehrich =

- Ortsteil of Greußen
- Coat of arms
- Interactive map of Großenehrich
- Location within Germany Location within Thuringia
- Coordinates: 51°14′58″N 10°49′56″E
- Country: Germany
- State: Thuringia
- District: Kyffhäuserkreis
- Town: Greußen
- Subdivisions: 10

Area
  - Total: 63.34 km^{2} (24.46 sq mi)
- Elevation: 240 m (790 ft)

Population (2019-12-31)
  - Total: 2,299
  - Density: 36.30/km^{2} (94.01/sq mi)
- Time zone: UTC+01:00 (CET)
  - Summer (DST): UTC+02:00 (CEST)
- Postal codes: 99718
- Dialling codes: 036370
- Vehicle registration: KYF
- Website: www.stadt-grossenehrich.de

Großenehrich (German pronunciation: [ˌɡʁoːsn̩ˈʔeːʁɪç]) is a town and a former municipality in the Kyffhäuserkreis district, in Thuringia, Germany. It is situated 13 km south of Sondershausen, and 34 km northwest of Erfurt. Since January 2021 it is part of the town Greußen.
