= Strübing =

Strübing is a German surname. Notable people with the surname include:

- Christine Strübing (born 1952), East German swimmer
- Volker Strübing (born 1971), German book author and songwriter
