= Paul Willert =

German opera singer

Max Paul Georg Willert (12 December 1901 – 17 June 1988) was a German musicologist and baritone.

== Life ==
Willert was born in 1901 as the son of a teacher and a housewife in Tanna, Thuringia. He was a pupil at the elementary school and the Realgymnasium in Bad Frankenhausen. Until the first teacher's examination in 1921 he attended the teacher's seminar. Leipzig. In 1924 the second teacher's examination followed. After a short Volksschule teacher period in Chemnitz, he studied musicology, music pedagogy and German literature at the Leipzig University and singing at the University of Music and Theatre Leipzig from 1926 to 1928. He also passed the Maturazeugnis for elementary school teachers at the Friedrich-Schiller-Schule (Leipzig). In 1928 he acquired the teaching qualification for singing and then worked as a music teacher at the Realgymnasium in Greiz as well as a concert and oratorio singer.

In 1933 the entire teaching staff of the Realgymnasium joined the NSDAP. In 1938 he was granted leave of absence for studies at the Musikhochschule Weimar; he passed the state examinations for music, musicology and German (upper school) and was an assistant at the musicological institute of the University of Jena. In 1940 he was awarded a doctorate in German Studies by Arthur Witte and Bernhard Kummer at the Faculty of Philosophy with the dissertation as Dr. phil. From 1940 to 1942 he was music teacher at the Realgymnasium Greiz. In 1941 he passed the assessors' examination in Weimar. In 1942 he became a secondary school teacher at the Aufbauschule in Weimar and lecturer at the Music Pedagogical Institute of the Weimar Academy of Music. In February 1943 he was drafted into the Wehrmacht, where he worked as military musician among others. From April 1945 to March 1947 he spent time in French war captivity in Heidenheim-Kreuznach-Rennes.

From 1947 to 1949 he was choirmaster and opera singer at the theatre in Greiz and afterwards opera and concert singer (baritone) at the Wismar Theatre. In 1951 he became university lecturer and director of the Institute for Music Education at the Pedagogical Faculty of the University of Rostock. In 1952/53 he was a lecturer for music education at the Institute for Music Education at Leipzig University. In 1953 he was appointed professor with a lectureship for theory of music and singing education at the Pedagogical Faculty of the Leipzig University. From 1957 to 1959 he was vice dean. In 1965 he became professor with a full lectureship for music history, instrumentology and folk song studies at the same university, from 1965 on at the Institute for Musicology of the University of Leipzig, department of music education. In 1966/67 he was head of the department of artistic practice at the institute. In addition, he was second chairman of the Senate Cultural Commission of the University. In 1967 he became Emeritus.

From 1947 to 1967 Willert was member of the Kulturbund der DDR. From 1960 he belonged to the Verband der Komponisten und Musikwissenschaftler der DDR, the Gesellschaft für Musikforschung and the Gesellschaft zur Verbreitung wissenschaftlicher Kenntnisse (Urania). From 1961 to 1967 he was on the Leipzig district board of the Urania.

In 1972, Willert moved to the Federal Republic of Germany to Dietzenbach-Steinberg (Hessen), where he was the representative of the organist in the Martin Luther Protestant congregation. From 1981 to 1986 he represented the organist in the Evangelical Lutheran parish of St. Peter in Weende (Göttingen) and in the Evangelical Lutheran parish of the monastery church of St. Nicholas in Göttingen-Nikolausberg. In the FRG he published numerous introductions to works and operas.

Willert died in Göttingen at the age of 86.

== Awards ==
- 1963: Pestalozzi-Medaille für treue Dienste (Bronze)
- 1965: Medaille für ausgezeichnete Leistungen
