= Greußen (Verwaltungsgemeinschaft) =

- Verwaltungsgemeinschaft
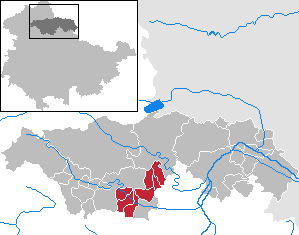
- Location of Greußen within Kyffhäuserkreis district
- Interactive map of Greußen
- Location within Germany Location within Thuringia
- Coordinates: 51.217°N 10.950°E
- Country: Germany
- State: Thuringia
- District: Kyffhäuserkreis
- Subdivisions: 7 municipalities

Area
  - Total: 63.04 km^{2} (24.34 sq mi)

Population (2025-12-31)
  - Total: 2,930
  - Density: 46.5/km^{2} (120/sq mi)
- Time zone: UTC+01:00 (CET)
  - Summer (DST): UTC+02:00 (CEST)
- Vehicle registration: KYF
- Website: www.vgem-greussen.de

Greußen is a Verwaltungsgemeinschaft ("collective municipality") in the district Kyffhäuserkreis, in Thuringia, Germany. The seat of the Verwaltungsgemeinschaft is in Greußen, itself not part of the Verwaltungsgemeinschaft.

The Verwaltungsgemeinschaft Greußen consists of the following municipalities:

1. Clingen
2. Niederbösa
3. Oberbösa
4. Topfstedt
5. Trebra
6. Wasserthaleben
7. Westgreußen
