= Bebra (Sondershausen) =

Coordinates: 51°21′43″N 10°50′18″E

- Settlement
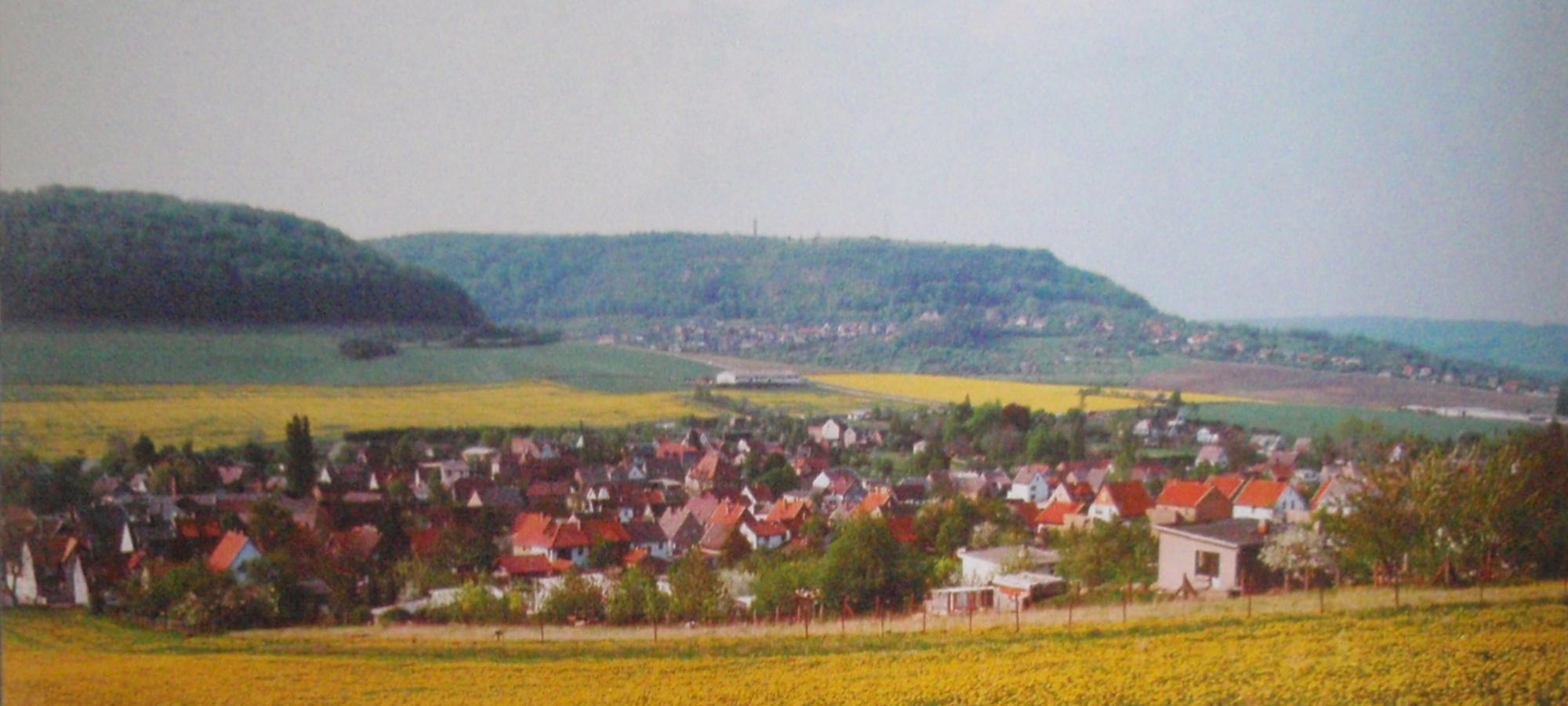
- Bebra
- Interactive map of Bebra
- Country: Germany
- State: Thuringia
- Town: Sondershausen
- District: Kyffhäuserkreis
- Established: 1202

Bebra is a community in the town of Sondershausen in Thuringia, Germany, it was first mentioned in a document in 1202. The village was incorporated in 1922.

The village is located west of Sondershausen at the foot of the mountain Frauenberg near the river Bebra. In the center stands the St. Georg Church.

== Sources ==
- Ersterwähnung Thüringer Städte und Dörfer bis 1300; publisher: Harald Rockstuhl, 2001, ISBN 3-934748-58-9
- Liebeserklärung an eine Stadt – Sondershausen; publisher: Bildarchiv Röttig, 2000
