= Schernberg =

Former municipality in Thuringia, Germany

Coordinates: 51.328°N 10.769°E

Schernberg (German pronunciation: [ˈʃɛʁnˌbɛʁk]) is a former municipality in the district Kyffhäuserkreis, in Thuringia, Germany. Since 1 December 2007, it is part of the town Sondershausen.
