= Trebra =

- Municipality
- Coat of arms

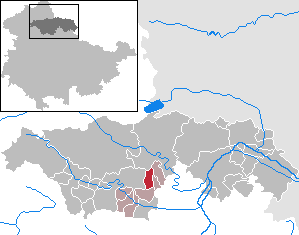
- Location of Trebra within Kyffhäuserkreis district
- Interactive map of Trebra
- Location within Germany Location within Thuringia
- Coordinates: 51°17′4″N 10°58′45″E
- Country: Germany
- State: Thuringia
- District: Kyffhäuserkreis
- Municipal assoc.: Greußen

Government
  - Mayor (2022–28): Michael Höxtermann

Area
  - Total: 7.94 km^{2} (3.07 sq mi)
- Elevation: 260 m (850 ft)

Population (2025-12-31)
  - Total: 283
  - Density: 35.6/km^{2} (92.3/sq mi)
- Time zone: UTC+01:00 (CET)
  - Summer (DST): UTC+02:00 (CEST)
- Postal codes: 99718
- Dialling codes: 036379
- Vehicle registration: KYF

Trebra is a municipality in the district Kyffhäuserkreis, in Thuringia, Germany.
