= Roßleben =

- Ortsteil of Roßleben-Wiehe
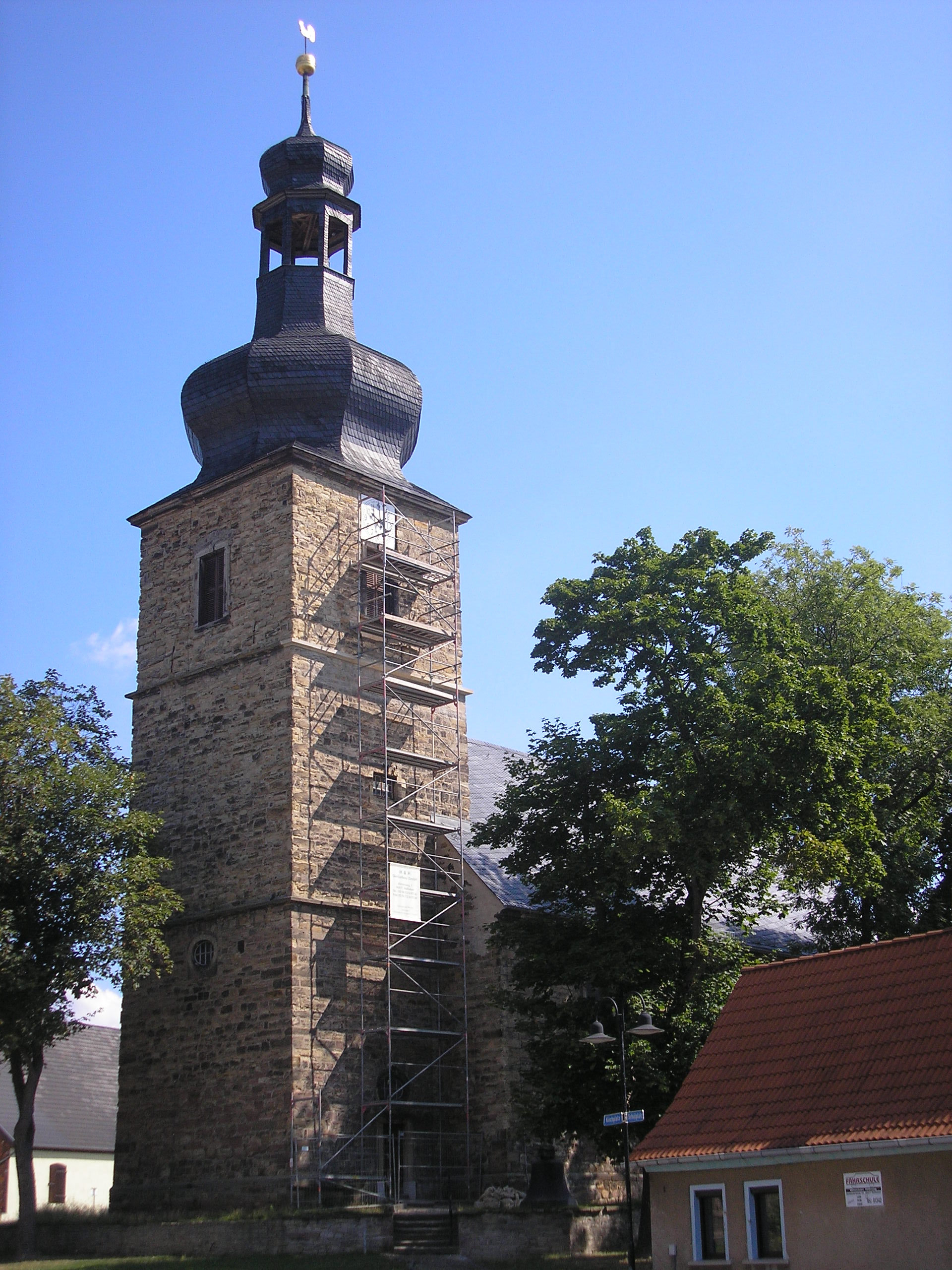
- Parish church

- Coat of arms
- Interactive map of Roßleben
- Location within Germany Location within Thuringia
- Coordinates: 51°17′52″N 11°26′0″E
- Country: Germany
- State: Thuringia
- District: Kyffhäuserkreis
- Town: Roßleben-Wiehe
- Subdivisions: 3

Area
  - Total: 33.57 km^{2} (12.96 sq mi)
- Elevation: 119 m (390 ft)

Population (2017-12-31)
  - Total: 4,885
  - Density: 145.5/km^{2} (376.9/sq mi)
- Time zone: UTC+01:00 (CET)
  - Summer (DST): UTC+02:00 (CEST)
- Postal codes: 06571
- Dialling codes: 034672
- Vehicle registration: KYF
- Website: rossleben-wiehe.de

Roßleben (German pronunciation: [ˈʁɔsˌleːbn̩]) is a town and a former municipality in the Kyffhäuserkreis district, with a population of 4,885 (2017). It is located in Thuringia, Germany. Since 1 January 2019, it is part of the town Roßleben-Wiehe. It is situated on the river Unstrut, 22 km southeast of Sangerhausen.

== Population development ==
- 1994: 5157
- 1996: 5063
- 1998: 4848
- 2000: 6735
- 2002: 6403
- 2004: 6192
- 2006: 5987
- 2008: 5724
- 2010: 5540
- 2012: 5323
- 2014: 5149
- 2015: 5065

From 1999 with districts

Data source: Statistical office Thuringia

== Sons and daughters of the town ==
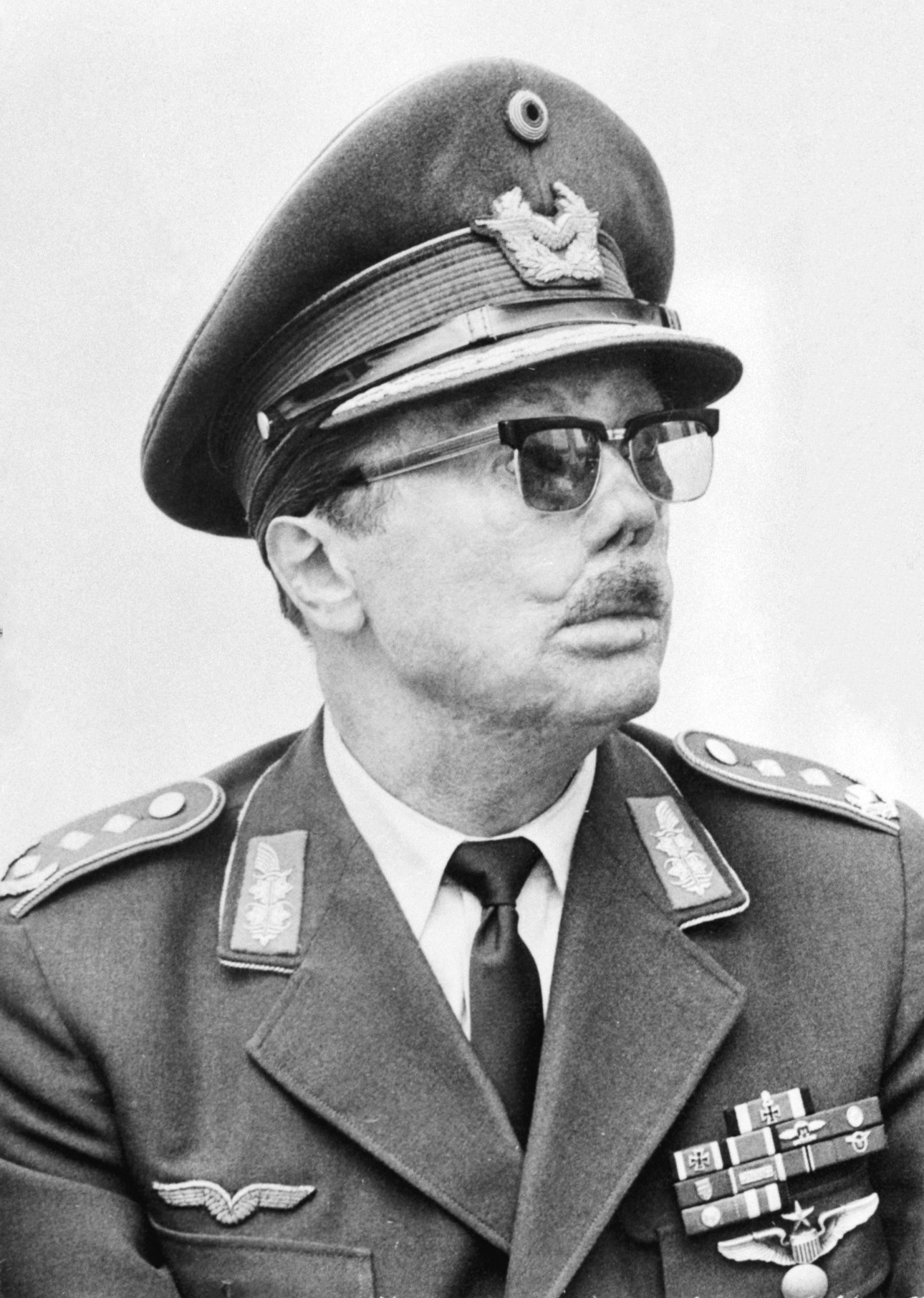
Johannes Steinhoff in 1966

- Fritz Hofmann, (1871-1927), athlete, sprinter, winner of the first medal for Germany at the Olympic Games 1896 in Athens
- Hugo Launicke, (1909-1975), antifascist and SED politician.
- Werner Heine (born 1935), footballer
- Richard Hüttig (1908-1934), communist, hanged on 14 June 1934 in Berlin-Plötzensee
- Johannes Steinhoff (1913-1994), fighter pilot in the Second World War, general and inspector of the Luftwaffe in the Federal Republic of Germany
