= Oberbösa =

- Municipality
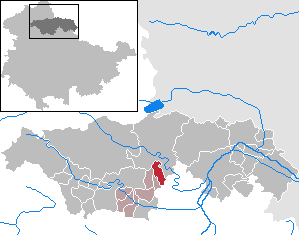
- Location of Oberbösa within Kyffhäuserkreis district
- Interactive map of Oberbösa
- Location within Germany Location within Thuringia
- Coordinates: 51°17′22″N 11°0′59″E
- Country: Germany
- State: Thuringia
- District: Kyffhäuserkreis
- Municipal assoc.: Greußen

Government
  - Mayor (2022–28): Steffen Köhne

Area
  - Total: 11.00 km^{2} (4.25 sq mi)
- Elevation: 240 m (790 ft)

Population (2025-12-31)
  - Total: 291
  - Density: 26.5/km^{2} (68.5/sq mi)
- Time zone: UTC+01:00 (CET)
  - Summer (DST): UTC+02:00 (CEST)
- Postal codes: 99718
- Dialling codes: 036379
- Vehicle registration: KYF

Oberbösa is a municipality in the district Kyffhäuserkreis, in Thuringia, Germany.
