= Jecha (Sondershausen) =

Coordinates: 51°21′N 10°53′E

- Part of town
- Interactive map of Jecha
- Country: Germany
- State: Thuringia
- Municipality: Sondershausen
- First mentioned: 1282
- Incorporated: 1950

Jecha is a part of the town Sondershausen in Thuringia and it was first mentioned in a document in 1282. The village was incorporated in 1950.

Jecha is located southeast of Sondershausen near the river Wipper. In the center stands the St. Matthäi Church, it is the oldest building still in use in Sondershausen.

== Sources ==
- Ersterwähnung Thüringer Städte und Dörfer bis 1300; publisher: Harald Rockstuhl, 2001, ISBN 3-934748-58-9
- Liebeserklärung an eine Stadt – Sondershausen; publisher: Bildarchiv Röttig, 2000
