= Westgreußen =

- Municipality
- Coat of arms

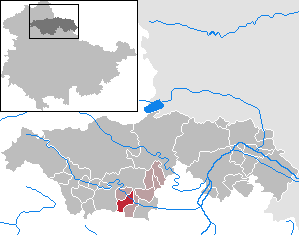
- Location of Westgreußen within Kyffhäuserkreis district
- Interactive map of Westgreußen
- Location within Germany Location within Thuringia
- Coordinates: 51°14′20″N 10°55′05″E
- Country: Germany
- State: Thuringia
- District: Kyffhäuserkreis
- Municipal assoc.: Greußen

Government
  - Mayor (2022–28): Sandra Lange

Area
  - Total: 8.46 km^{2} (3.27 sq mi)
- Elevation: 175 m (574 ft)

Population (2025-12-31)
  - Total: 351
  - Density: 41.5/km^{2} (107/sq mi)
- Time zone: UTC+01:00 (CET)
  - Summer (DST): UTC+02:00 (CEST)
- Postal codes: 99718
- Dialling codes: 03636
- Vehicle registration: KYF

Westgreußen (German pronunciation: [ˈvɛstˌɡʁɔʏsn̩]) is a municipality in the district Kyffhäuserkreis, in Thuringia, Germany.
