= Topfstedt =

- Municipality
- Coat of arms

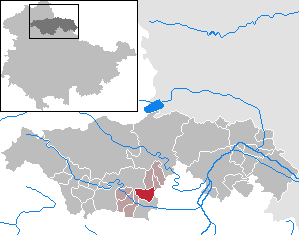
- Location of Topfstedt within Kyffhäuserkreis district
- Interactive map of Topfstedt
- Location within Germany Location within Thuringia
- Coordinates: 51°14′58″N 10°57′32″E
- Country: Germany
- State: Thuringia
- District: Kyffhäuserkreis
- Municipal assoc.: Greußen
- Subdivisions: 2

Government
  - Mayor (2022–28): René Kämmerer

Area
  - Total: 10.78 km^{2} (4.16 sq mi)
- Elevation: 175 m (574 ft)

Population (2025-12-31)
  - Total: 534
  - Density: 49.5/km^{2} (128/sq mi)
- Time zone: UTC+01:00 (CET)
  - Summer (DST): UTC+02:00 (CEST)
- Postal codes: 99718
- Dialling codes: 03636
- Vehicle registration: KYF

Topfstedt is a municipality in the district Kyffhäuserkreis, in Thuringia, Germany.

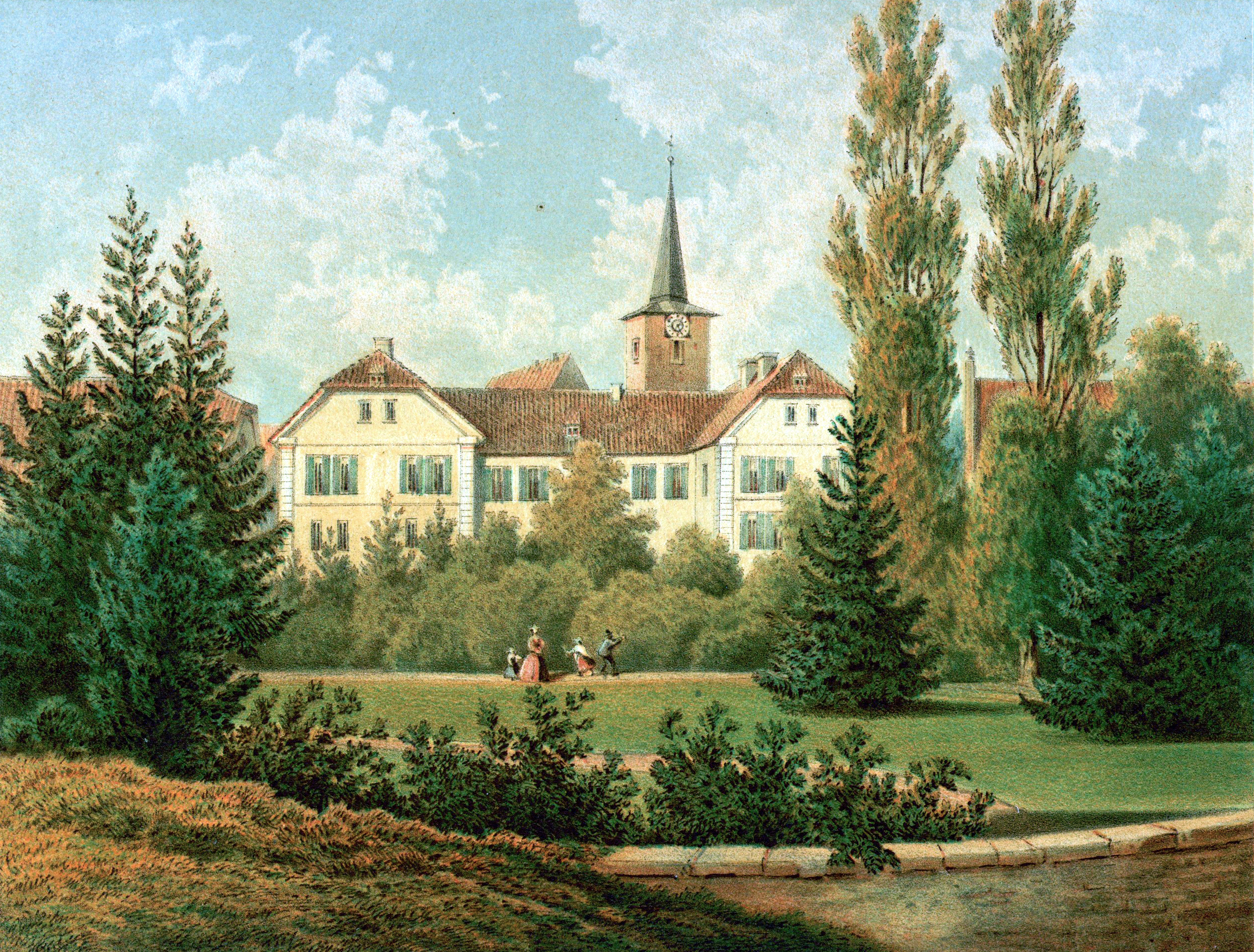
Rittergut Niedertopfstedt around 1860, Edition by Alexander Duncker

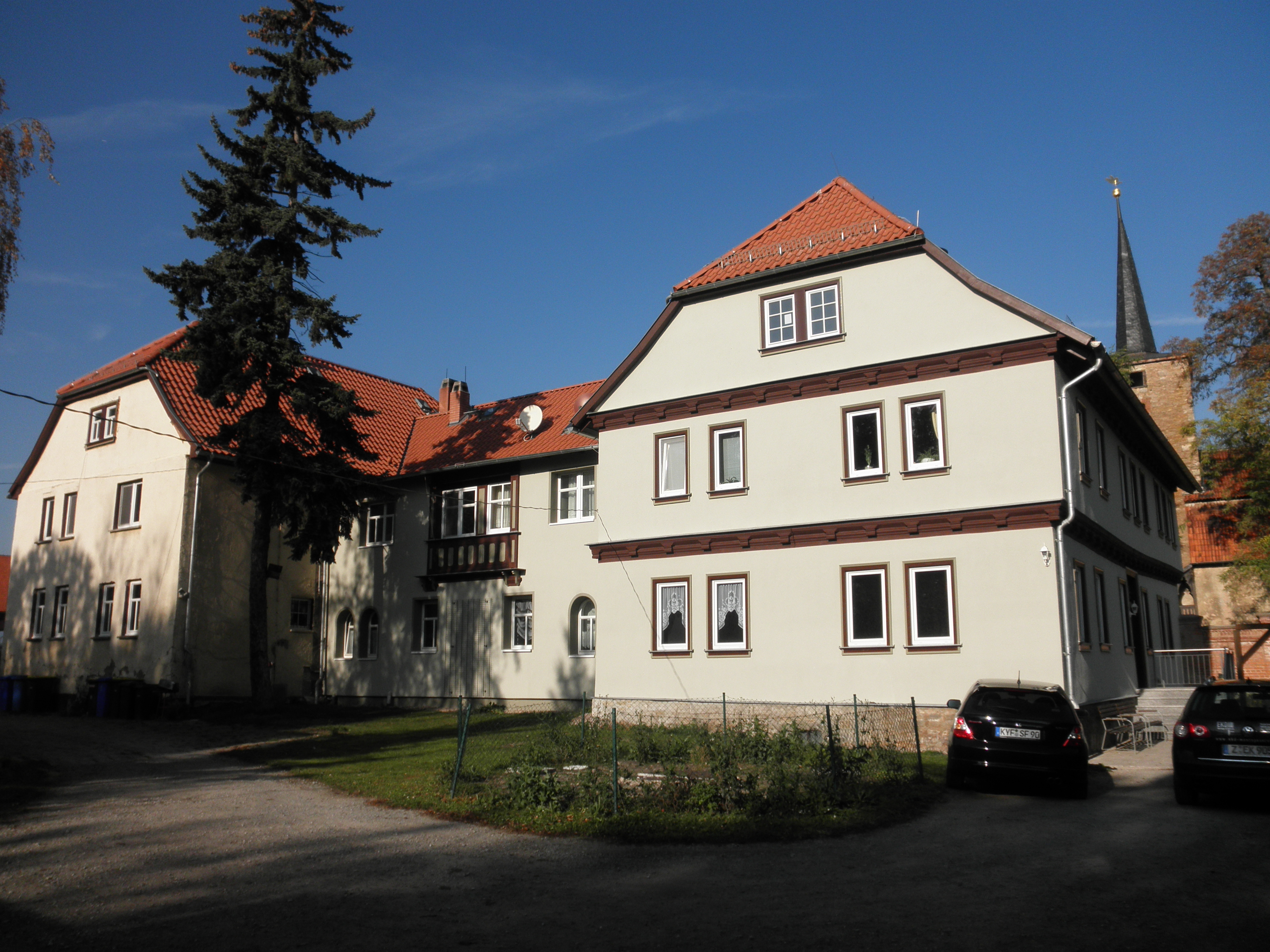
Rittergutshaus Niedertopfstedt, 2011
