= Thilo Irmisch =

German botanist (1816–1879)

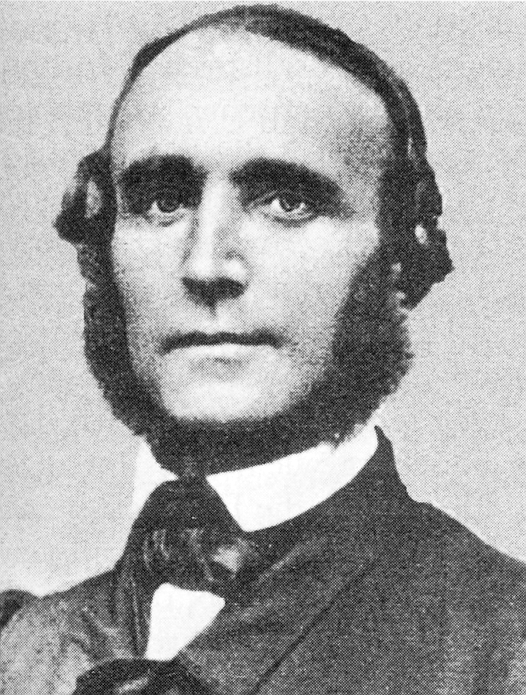
Thilo Irmisch

Johann Friedrich Thilo Irmisch (14 January 1816 in Sondershausen – 28 April 1879 in Sondershausen) was a 19th-century German botanist.

Irmisch studied theology, philosophy and natural history at the University of Halle-Wittenberg. He received training in botany from professor D. von Schlechtendal, who later became his friend. From 1855, he taught at the high school in Sondershausen. At the same time, he published numerous larger and smaller papers and books on botanical subjects, in particular plant morphology, e.g. Beiträge zur vergleichenden Morphologie der Pflanzen (Contribution to a comparative morphology of plants), published in six volumes 1854-1878.

Two plant genera were named to his honour. His friend and former teacher von Schlechtendal named the genus Irmischia, which was soon synonymized with Metastelma (Apocynaceae). August Eichler then named the genus Thiloa (Combretaceae) for Thilo Irmisch.

== Works ==
- Über einige Botaniker des 16. Jahrhunderts, welche sich um die Erforschung der Flora Thüringens, des Harzes und der angrenzenden Gegenden verdient gemacht haben . Eupel, Sondershausen 1862 Digital edition by the University and State Library Düsseldorf

== Literature ==
- Müllerott, M. (1980). "Thilo Irmisch 1816–1879. Ein Bibliographischer versuch nebst proben seines wissenschaftlichen Briefwechsels". Hoppea - Denkschrift der Regensburger Botanischen Gesellschaft. 39: 51–76.
