= Helbedündorf =

- Municipality
- Coat of arms

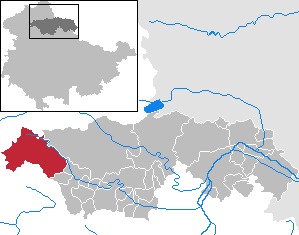
- Location of Helbedündorf within Kyffhäuserkreis district
- Interactive map of Helbedündorf
- Location within Germany Location within Thuringia
- Coordinates: 51°21′N 10°37′E
- Country: Germany
- State: Thuringia
- District: Kyffhäuserkreis
- Subdivisions: 7

Government
  - Mayor (2024–30): Jörg Steinmetz (CDU)

Area
  - Total: 96.30 km^{2} (37.18 sq mi)
- Elevation: 303 m (994 ft)

Population (2025-12-31)
  - Total: 2,113
  - Density: 21.94/km^{2} (56.83/sq mi)
- Time zone: UTC+01:00 (CET)
  - Summer (DST): UTC+02:00 (CEST)
- Postal codes: 99713
- Dialling codes: 036029 (Holzthaleben, Keula), 036330 (Großbrüchter, Kleinbrüchter, Peukendorf, Toba), 036338 (Friedrichsrode)
- Vehicle registration: KYF
- Website: www.helbeduendorf.de

Helbedündorf is a municipality in the district Kyffhäuserkreis, in Thuringia, Germany.
