= Stockhausen (Sondershausen) =

Part of Sondershausen, Germany

Coordinates: 51°22′41″N 10°51′15″E

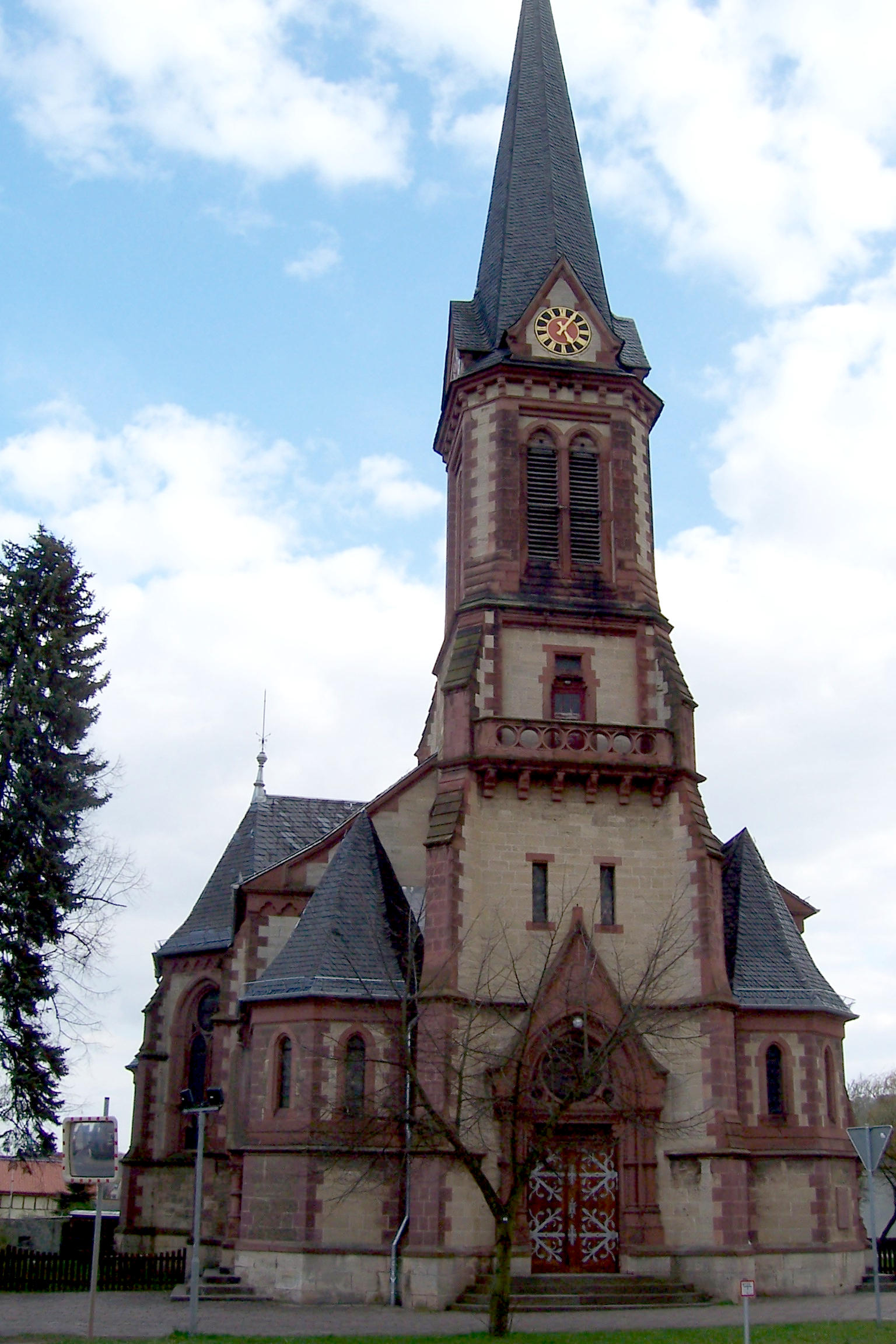
Church St. Matthias

Stockhausen is a part of the town of Sondershausen in Thuringia in Germany. It was probably founded in the early 11th century. The village of Stockhausen was incorporated in 1950.

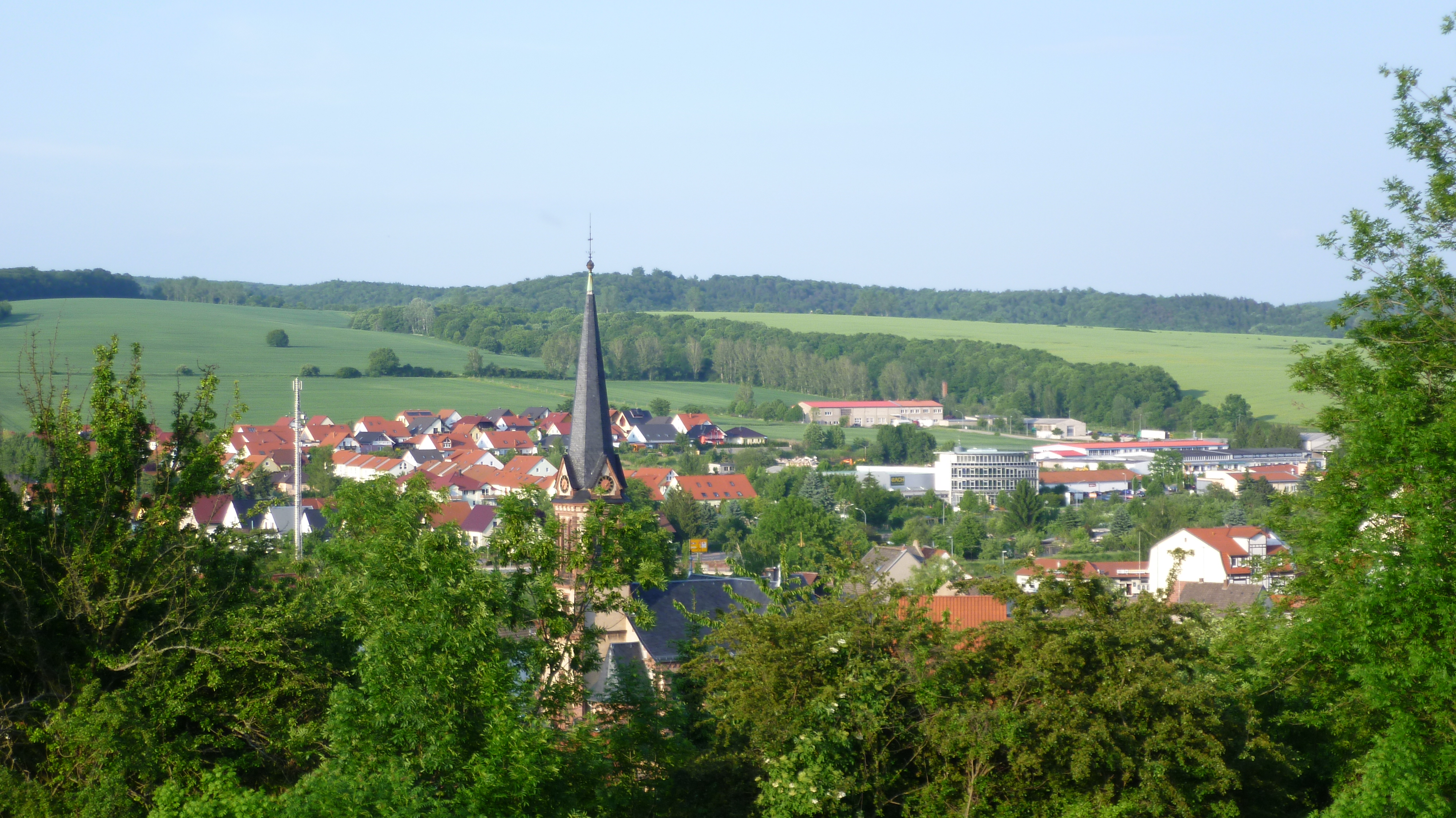
Stockhausen

Stockhausen is located west of Sondershausen at the foot of Mount Frauenberg near the Wipper River and has more than 2,000 inhabitants. In the center stands the Neo-Gothic Church of St. Matthias.

== Sources ==
- Liebeserklärung an eine Stadt – Sondershausen, publisher: Bildarchiv Röttig, 2000
- Church Reports of Stockhausen by Carl Möller
