= Niederbösa =

- Municipality
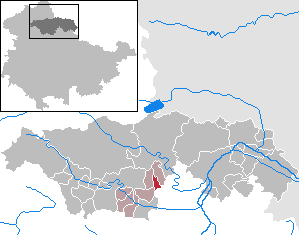
- Location of Niederbösa within Kyffhäuserkreis district
- Interactive map of Niederbösa
- Location within Germany Location within Thuringia
- Coordinates: 51°16′40″N 10°59′59″E
- Country: Germany
- State: Thuringia
- District: Kyffhäuserkreis
- Municipal assoc.: Greußen

Government
  - Mayor (2022–28): Maik Steinacker

Area
  - Total: 4.56 km^{2} (1.76 sq mi)
- Elevation: 205 m (673 ft)

Population (2025-12-31)
  - Total: 129
  - Density: 28.3/km^{2} (73.3/sq mi)
- Time zone: UTC+01:00 (CET)
  - Summer (DST): UTC+02:00 (CEST)
- Postal codes: 99718
- Dialling codes: 03636
- Vehicle registration: KYF

Niederbösa is a municipality in the district Kyffhäuserkreis, in Thuringia, Germany.
