= Wasserthaleben =

- Municipality
- Coat of arms

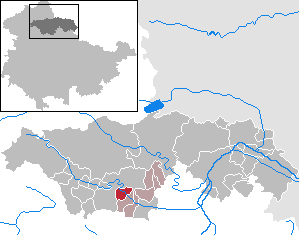
- Location of Wasserthaleben within Kyffhäuserkreis district
- Interactive map of Wasserthaleben
- Location within Germany Location within Thuringia
- Coordinates: 51°15′31″N 10°53′32″E
- Country: Germany
- State: Thuringia
- District: Kyffhäuserkreis
- Municipal assoc.: Greußen

Government
  - Mayor (2023–29): Manuel Wölbing

Area
  - Total: 8.50 km^{2} (3.28 sq mi)
- Elevation: 219 m (719 ft)

Population (2025-12-31)
  - Total: 357
  - Density: 42.0/km^{2} (109/sq mi)
- Time zone: UTC+01:00 (CET)
  - Summer (DST): UTC+02:00 (CEST)
- Postal codes: 99718
- Dialling codes: 036370
- Vehicle registration: KYF

Wasserthaleben is a municipality in the district Kyffhäuserkreis, in Thuringia, Germany. It has a postal code of 99718.
