= Carl Röse =

German dentist (1864–1947)

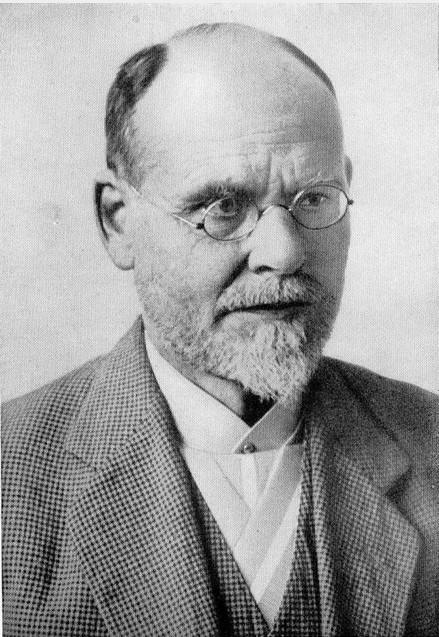

Carl Röse (1864–1947) was the first dentist to be nominated for the Nobel Prize in physiology or medicine for the "Study of the occurrence and cause of caries" in 1907 by G von Bunge. He was born on April 17, 1864, in Clingen, Schwarzburg-Sondershausen, German Confederation.

Aside from his contributions to cariology, his work on racial studies resulted in him receiving the Miller Prize and the Goethe Medal, both presented by Hitler. Röse died on March 9, 1947, in Gebesee, then in the Soviet occupation zone in Germany.
