= Hugo Launicke =

German resistance fighter (1909–1975)

Hugo Launicke (2 February 1909 – 6 June 1975) was a German resistance fighter against the Nazi régime and later a Socialist Unity Party of Germany (SED) politician in East Germany.

== Life ==
Launicke was born in Roßleben in the Province of Saxony and began by doing building work. In 1923, he joined the Communist Youth League of Germany (Kommunistischer Jugendverband Deutschlands; KJVD) and the Workers' Sporting Association (Arbeitersportverein). In 1927, he became a member of the Communist Party of Germany (KPD). He also became active in the Rotfrontkämpferbund.

From 1929 to 1931, he was a member of the KJVD's subdistrict (Unterbezirk) leadership in Naumburg and Teuchern. Afterwards, in 1930, Launicke was moved to Wiehe, and in 1931 he took on the function of a KJVD instructor of the subdistrict leadership in Halle.

In February 1933, not long after the Nazis seized power, he got a reprimand from the local district for his political activities. On 9 March 1933, he was arrested. There followed mistreatment and a transfer to the prison in Naumburg. The lay assessor's court (Schöffengericht) in that town sentenced him to three months' imprisonment for insulting a mayor.

On 17 October 1935 came a new sentencing. The Superior Court (Kammergericht) in Berlin (5th Penal Senate) imposed a four-year labour-prison (Zuchthaus) penalty for conspiracy to commit high-treasonous undertakings. He also had his civil rights suspended for five years (this was a common measure in Nazi courts). Only a short time after his release on 10 May 1939, he was once again arrested and taken away to Buchenwald concentration camp, more precisely the Rautalwerk Off-Site Command at Wernigerode. In this camp, he belonged to the illegal prison KPD leadership. In April 1945, he had to take part in a death march, which he survived.

After the Third Reich fell, Launicke became the mayor of Wiehe and KPD district secretary. Later, he took on the same function in the Kölleda district. He thereafter held posts in East Germany's Nationale Front in the Halle and Magdeburg districts. From 1958 to 1963, he was Chairman of the Ernst Thälmann Pioneer Organisation in the Magdeburg district. He then took over the leadership of the Antifascist Resistance Fighter Committee in the Magdeburg district.

In 1973, he received East Germany's Patriotic Order of Merit, in gold.

After his death, Magdeburg temporarily named a street Hugo-Launicke-Straße in his honour.

== Literature ==
- Was Magdeburger Straßennamen erzählen, ca. 1983, published by the Magdeburg SED city administration, written by Ingelore Buchholz.

== See also ==
- List of Germans who resisted Nazism
- List of Holocaust survivors
