= Clingen =

Town in Thuringia, Germany

- Town
- Coat of arms

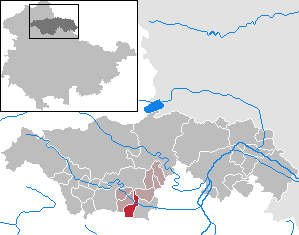
- Location of Clingen within Kyffhäuserkreis district
- Interactive map of Clingen
- Location within Germany Location within Thuringia
- Coordinates: 51°13′N 10°56′E
- Country: Germany
- State: Thuringia
- District: Kyffhäuserkreis
- Municipal assoc.: Greußen

Government
  - Mayor (2022–28): Mario Schütze

Area
  - Total: 10.75 km^{2} (4.15 sq mi)
- Elevation: 185 m (607 ft)

Population (2025-12-31)
  - Total: 985
  - Density: 91.6/km^{2} (237/sq mi)
- Time zone: UTC+01:00 (CET)
  - Summer (DST): UTC+02:00 (CEST)
- Postal codes: 99718
- Dialling codes: 03636
- Vehicle registration: KYF
- Website: www.clingen.net

Clingen (German pronunciation: [ˈklɪŋən]) is a town in the Kyffhäuserkreis district, in Thuringia, Germany. It is situated 16 km southeast of Sondershausen, and 30 km north of Erfurt.

Historical Population
Year	1994	1996	1998	2000	2002	2004	2006	2008	2010	2012	2014	2016
Population	1239	1259	1242	1222	1178	1138	1013	1084	1072	1059	1035	1021

as of 31 December
Source: Thuringian State Department of Statistics

== Notable people ==
- Rudolf Boese (1839-1912), Member of Landtag
- Günter Grüner (1942-2016), Member of Thuringian State Parliament
- Carl Röse (1864-1947), Dentist
