= Richard Hüttig =

German anti-fascist (1908–1934)

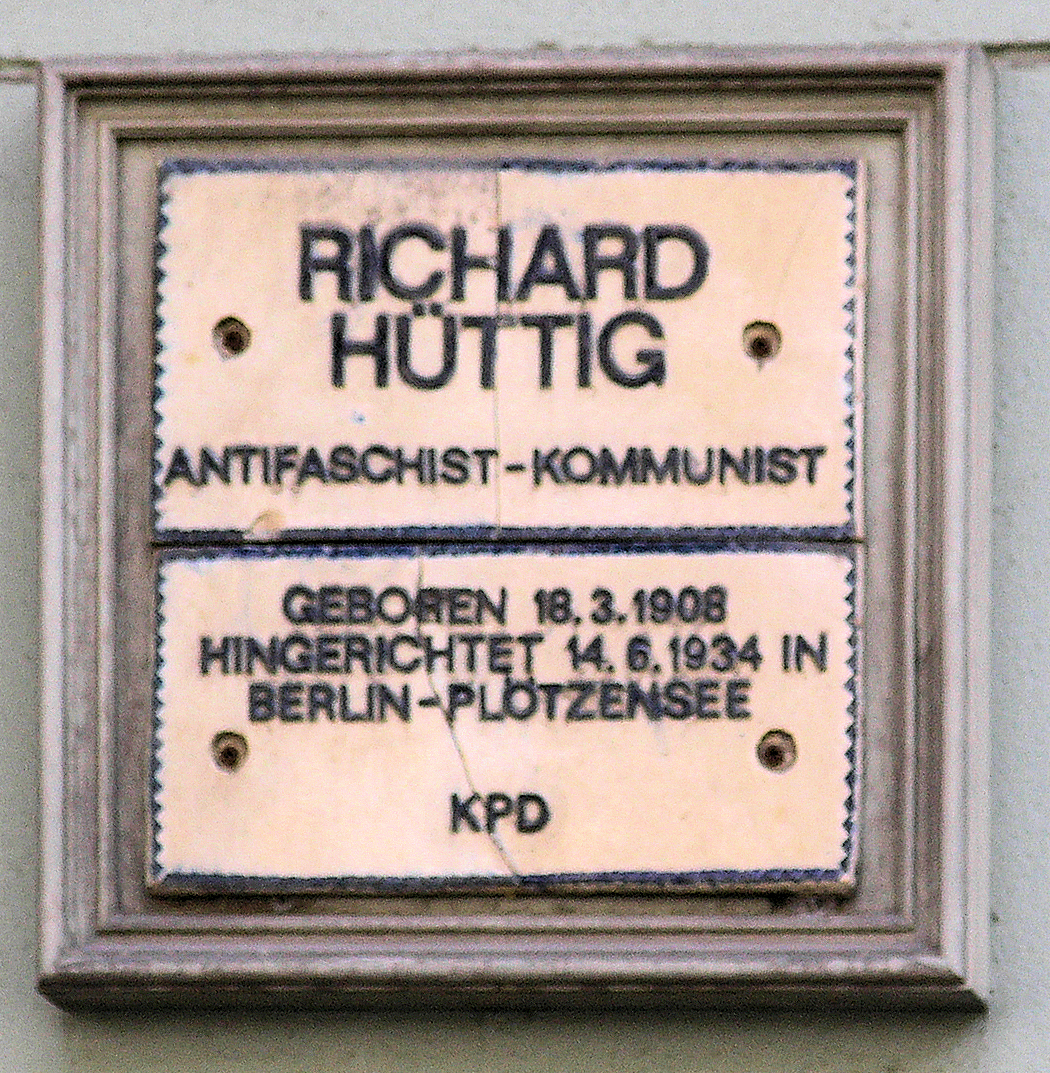
- Memorial plaque at Seelingstraße 21, near Schloss Charlottenburg, Berlin-Charlottenburg
- Born: March 18, 1908; Province of Saxony, German Empire
- Died: June 14, 1934 (aged 26); Plötzensee Prison, Gau March of Brandenburg, Nazi Germany
- Cause of death: Judicial murder
- Organization: Häuserschutzstaffeln
- Political party: KPD
- Other political affiliations: Rote Jungfront
- Movement: Communism
- Opponent: SA

Richard Hüttig (18 March 1908 in Roßleben-Bottendorf – 14 June 1934 in Berlin) was a German Communist who was persecuted and executed by the Nazis. Today, a street in Berlin and a square in his birthplace Roßleben are named after him.

== Life ==
Hüttig's family worked the land. At the age of 20, he moved to Berlin, where he eventually joined the Rote Jungfront and eventually also the Communist Party of Germany (KPD).

By 1930, Hüttig was leader of the Häuserschutzstaffeln (transl. house protection squad) in his neighbourhood in Charlottenburg, which had been set up to ward off Brown Shirt terror raids. It was in a way a kind of self-help organization. Not officially connected to the KPD, it nonetheless received advice from the KPD local Tietz at Nehringstraße 4a in Berlin (nowadays there is a driving school there). When the SA was in sight, the Häuserschutzstaffeln could be alerted by acoustic signals.

== Arrest, trial, and death ==
Hüttig was arrested during a crackdown on anti-régime elements on 14 September 1933, after Hitler had seized power, whereafter he spent several months in the Columbia-Haus concentration camp. Eventually, he was brought before the court.

Hüttig and those tried along with him were accused of having shot SS-Scharführer Kurt von der Ahé dead during a joint SA-SS raid on his neighbourhood on 17 February 1933. Nothing could be proved on that point, however, and the court even admitted that it was not credible to suggest that Hüttig had done this crime, especially as there were eyewitnesses who swore that Ahé had been shot by his own people. Moreover, Hüttig had had no gun. This, however, did not stop the court from convicting Hüttig of severe breach of the public peace and attempted murder, or from sentencing him to death. He was beheaded in the courtyard at Plötzensee Prison in Berlin with an axe. He was one of many Communists executed at Plötzensee at around this time.

== Memorials to Hüttig ==
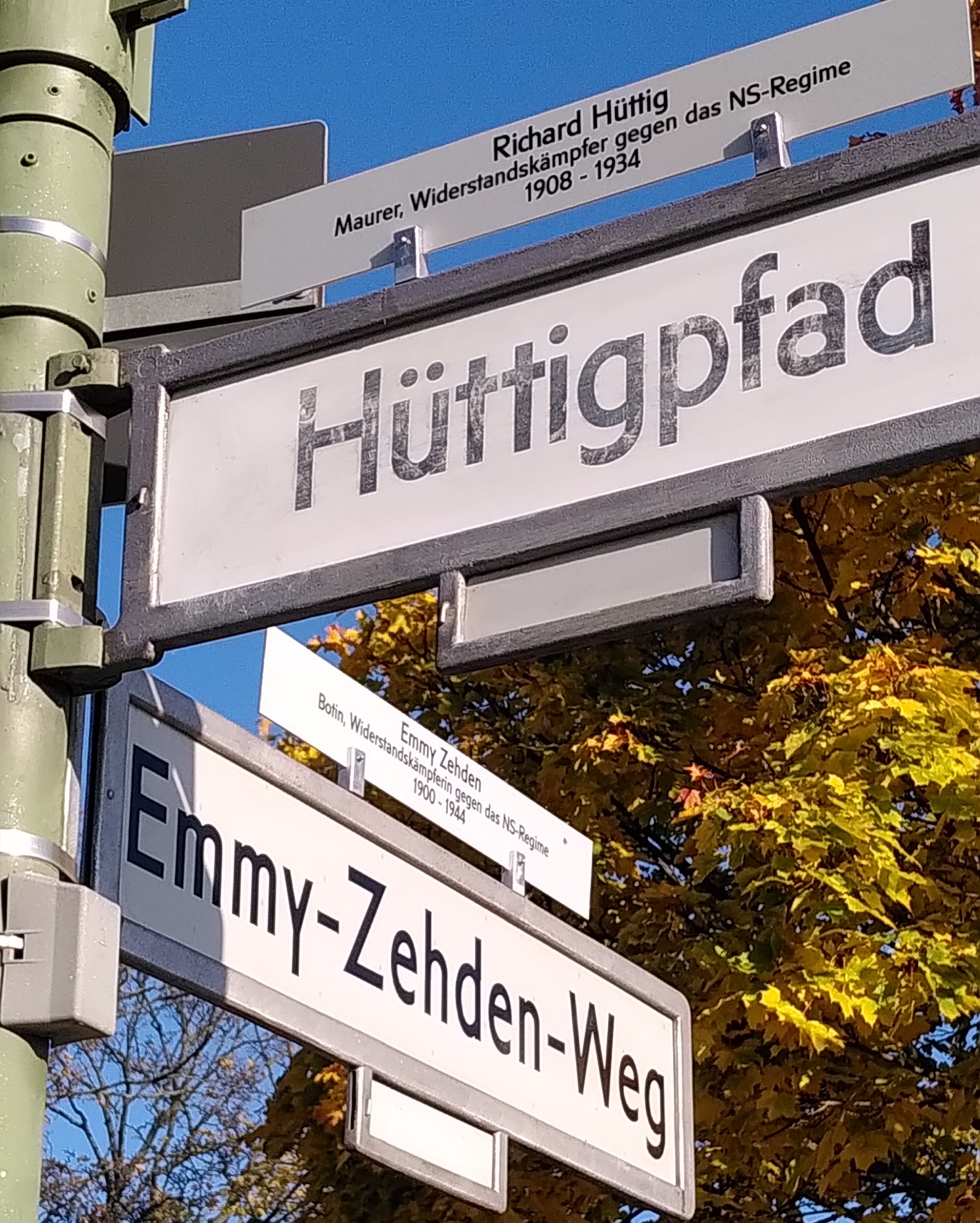
The street sign for Hüttigpfad in Charlottenburg-Nord

The laneway leading to the Plötzensee Memorial is now named Hüttigpfad after him. It was given the name in 1950. There is also a plaque in Hüttig's memory at Seelingstraße 21, near Schloss Charlottenburg. A square in Hüttig's birthplace Roßleben, formerly named "Schenkenplatz" (except during Nazi rule, when it was named for Hitler), is now named "Richard-Hüttig-Platz". Some local people in Roßleben, however, have tried to have the square's old name restored, saying that they don't want to remember a "murderer". There was another memorial plaque to him at the local inn, the "Thüringer Hof", placed by the Vereinigung der Verfolgten des Naziregimes ("Association of Persecution Victims of the Nazi Régime"). The old inn is gone now, but the plaque has been relocated to a savings bank near its original site.
