= Johann Karl Wezel =

German poet, novelist and philosopher

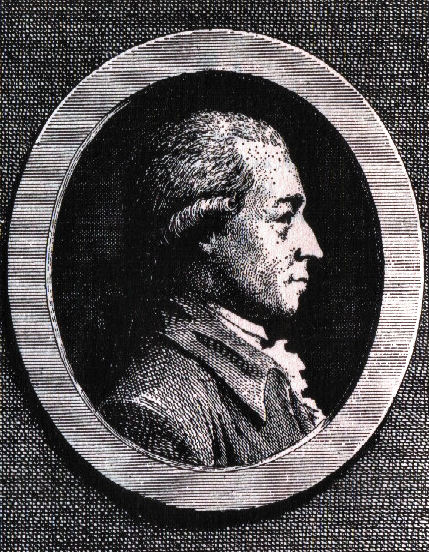
- Copper engraving by Christian Gottlieb Geyser
- Born: October 31, 1747; Sondershausen, Germany
- Died: January 28, 1819 (aged 71); Sondershausen, Germany
- Occupation: writer
- Writing career
- Notable work: Belphegor
- Literary movement: Enlightenment

Johann Karl Wezel (October 31, 1747, in Sondershausen, Germany – January 28, 1819, in Sondershausen), also Johann Carl Wezel, was a German poet, novelist, and philosopher of the Enlightenment.

== Life ==
Born the son of domestic servants, Wezel studied Theology, Law, Philosophy, and Philology at the University of Leipzig. Early philosophical influences include John Locke and Julien Offray de La Mettrie. After positions as a tutor at the courts of Bautzen and Berlin, Wezel lived as a freelance writer. A short stay in Vienna did not result in him getting employed by the local, national theater. He thus moved back to Leipzig and, in 1793, to Sondershausen, which he did not leave again until he died in 1819.

Although his works were extremely successful when published, Wezel was almost forgotten when he died. His rediscovery in the second half of the 20th century is mainly due to German author Arno Schmidt who published a radio essay about him in 1959.

== Works ==
- Filibert und Theodosia (1772)
- Lebensgeschichte Tobias Knauts, des Weisen, sonst der Stammler genannt: aus Familiennachrichten gesammelt (1773–1776)
- Der Graf von Wickham (1774)
- Epistel an die deutschen Dichter (1775)
- Belphegor oder die wahrscheinlichste Geschichte unter der Sonne (1776)
- Herrmann und Ulrike (1780)
- Appellation der Vokalen an das Publikum (1778)
- Die wilde Betty (1779)
- Zelmor und Ermide (1779)
- Tagebuch eines neuen Ehmanns (1779)
- Robinson Krusoe. Neu bearbeitet (1779)
- Ueber Sprache, Wißenschaften und Geschmack der Teutschen (1781)
- Meine Auferstehung (1782)
- Wilhelmine Arend oder die Gefahren der Empfindsamkeit (1782)
- Kakerlak, oder Geschichte eines Rosenkreuzers aus dem vorigen Jahrhunderte (1784)
- Versuch über die Kenntniß des Menschen (1784–1785)
