= Abtsbessingen =

- Municipality
- Coat of arms

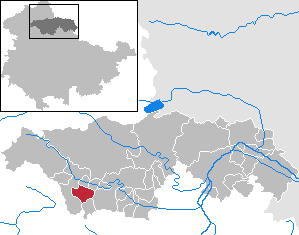
- Location of Abtsbessingen within Kyffhäuserkreis district
- Interactive map of Abtsbessingen
- Location within Germany Location within Thuringia
- Coordinates: 51°15′39″N 10°45′51″E
- Country: Germany
- State: Thuringia
- District: Kyffhäuserkreis

Government
  - Mayor (2021–27): Juliane Kumpf

Area
  - Total: 14.09 km^{2} (5.44 sq mi)
- Elevation: 260 m (850 ft)

Population (2025-12-31)
  - Total: 463
  - Density: 32.9/km^{2} (85.1/sq mi)
- Time zone: UTC+01:00 (CET)
  - Summer (DST): UTC+02:00 (CEST)
- Postal codes: 99713
- Dialling codes: 036020
- Vehicle registration: KYF

Abtsbessingen is a municipality in the district Kyffhäuserkreis, in Thuringia, Germany.

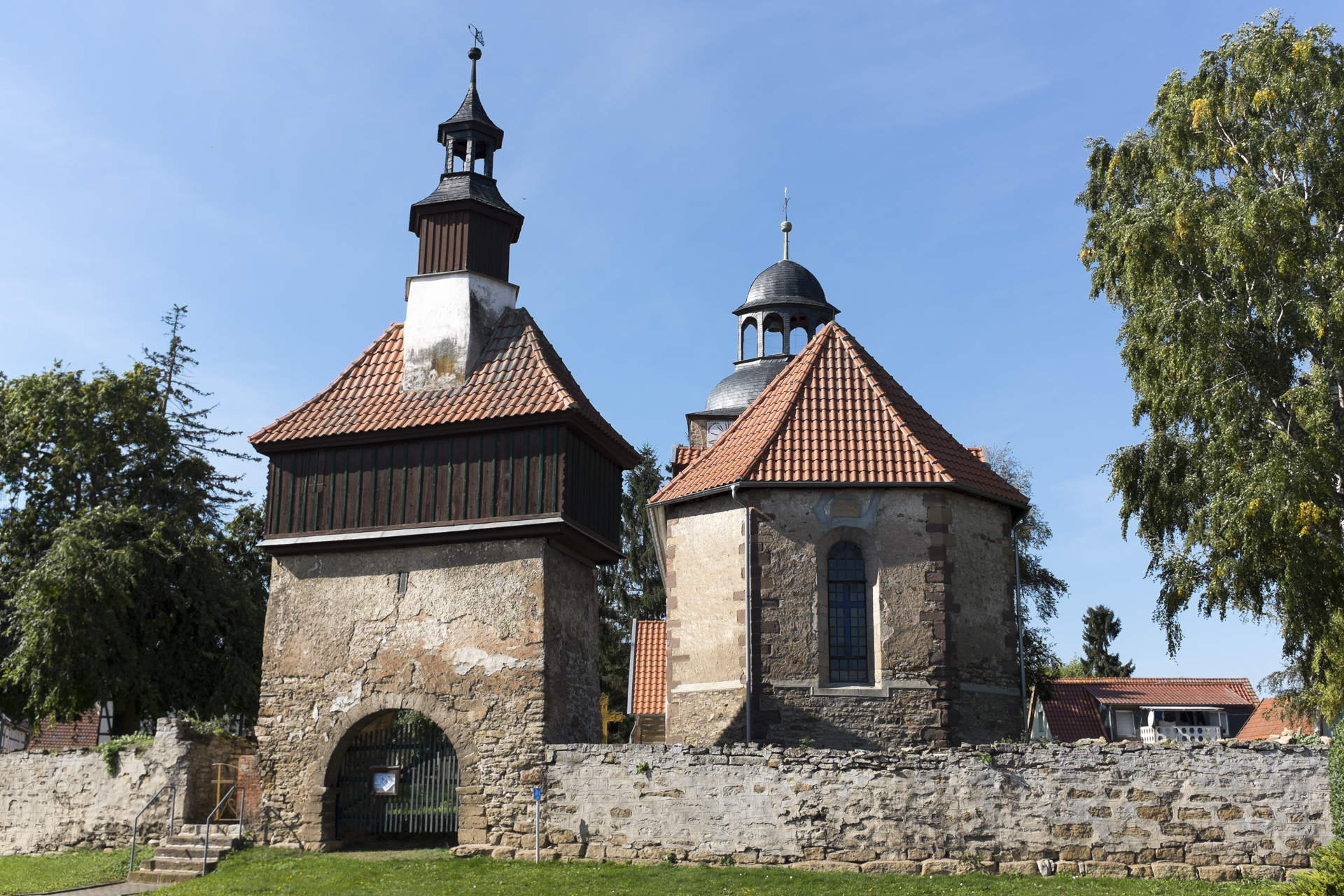
Abtsbessingen - Church St. Crucis
