= Hirschberg, Thuringia =

Hirschberg
- Town
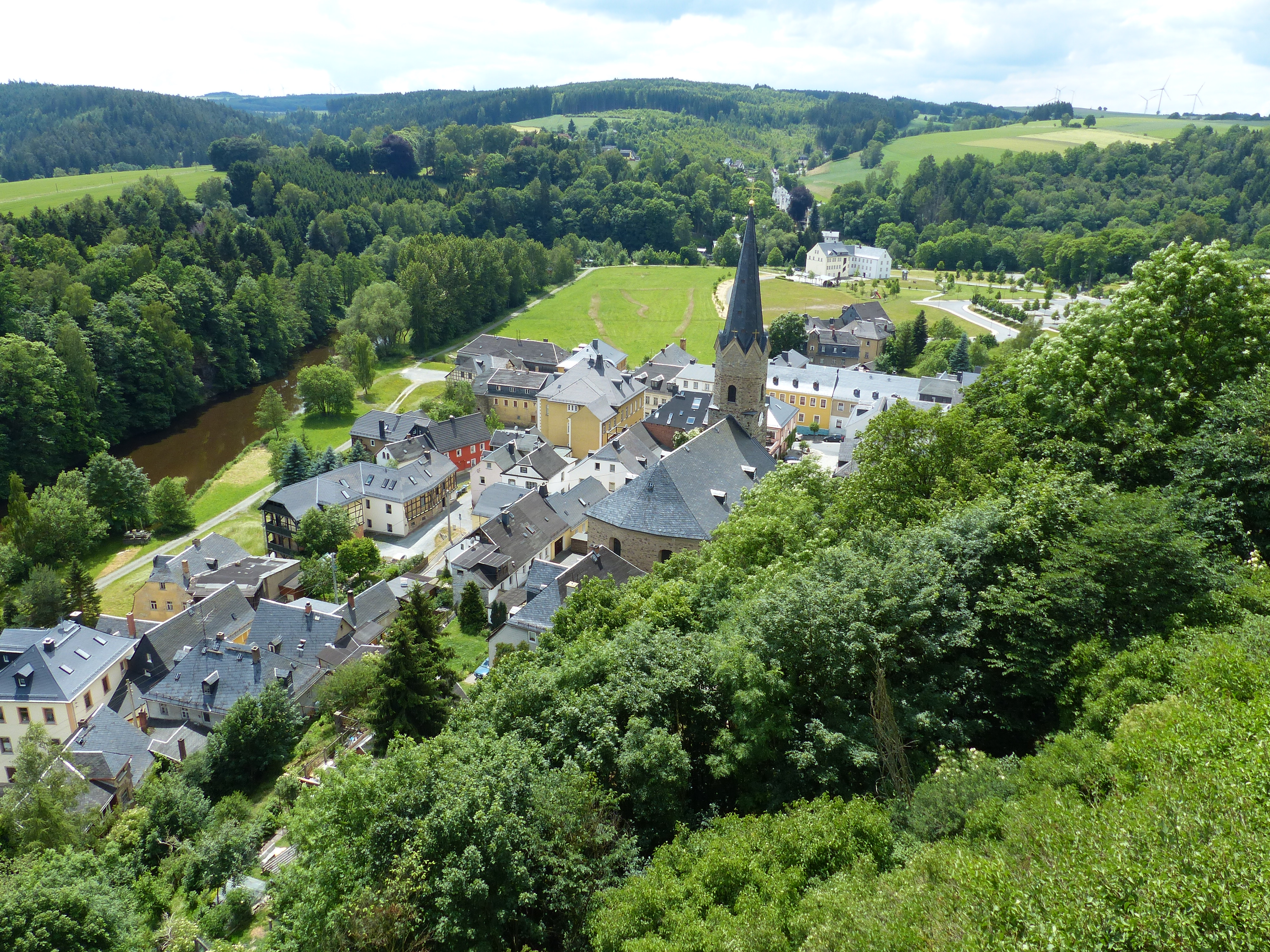
- View of the town

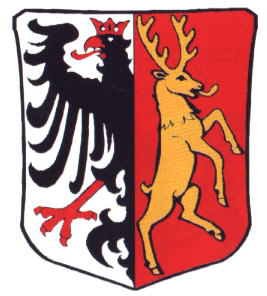
- Coat of arms

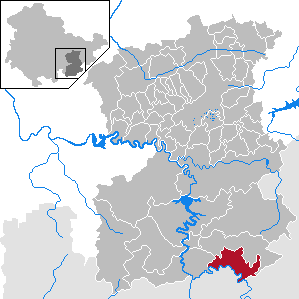
- Location of Hirschberg within Saale-Orla-Kreis district
- Interactive map of Hirschberg
- Location within Germany Location within Thuringia
- Coordinates: 50°24′21″N 11°49′12″E
- Country: Germany
- State: Thuringia
- District: Saale-Orla-Kreis

Government
  - Mayor (2024–30): Ronald Schricker

Area
  - Total: 24.13 km^{2} (9.32 sq mi)
- Elevation: 454 m (1,490 ft)

Population (2025-12-31)
  - Total: 2,105
  - Density: 87.24/km^{2} (225.9/sq mi)
- Time zone: UTC+01:00 (CET)
  - Summer (DST): UTC+02:00 (CEST)
- Postal codes: 07927
- Dialling codes: 036644
- Vehicle registration: SOK
- Website: www.stadt-hirschberg-saale.de

Hirschberg (German pronunciation: [ˈhɪʁʃˌbɛʁk]) is a town in the Saale-Orla-Kreis district, in Thuringia, Germany. It is situated on the river Saale, 20 km south of Schleiz, 12 km northwest of Hof (Bavaria), and 25 km southwest of Plauen (Saxony).

== History ==
1154:	First mentioned in documents.
1871-1918:	Within the German Empire, Hirschberg was part of the Principality of Reuss-Gera.
1966-1990:	Hirschberg served as East German inner German border crossing for cars travelling between the East German Democratic Republic, or West Berlin and the West German Federal Republic of Germany. The traffic was subject to the Interzonal traffic regulations, that between West Germany and West Berlin followed the special regulations of the Transit Agreement (1972).

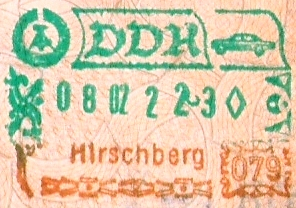
Hirschberg crossing passport stamp.

== Demographics, politics and government ==
Hirschberg is located next to the motorway A 9 (Berlin – Munich). The city includes the subdivisions: Juchhöh, Göritz, Sparnberg, Ullersreuth and Venzka.

=== Annexation of Subdivisions ===
The dates into the brackets are the first documentary citations.

- 1. January 1974: Venzka (24. July 1348) with Juchhöh (1713-1715)
- 8. March 1994: Göritz (20. February 1282), Sparnberg (1202) and Ullersreuth (1246)

=== Population ===
Trend of population figures (reference is starting at 1994):

1830 — 1995

- 1830: 1760
- 1933: 2915
- 1939: 2888
- 1994: 2923
- 1995: 2846

1996 — 2000

- 1996: 2748
- 1997: 2749
- 1998: 2674
- 1999: 2654
- 2000: 2666

2001 — 2004

- 2001: 2670
- 2002: 2653
- 2003: 2612
- 2004: 2600
- 2005: 2569

2006 — 2009

- 2006: 2526
- 2007: 2493
- 2008: 2488
- 2009: 2373
- 2010: 2352

== Culture ==
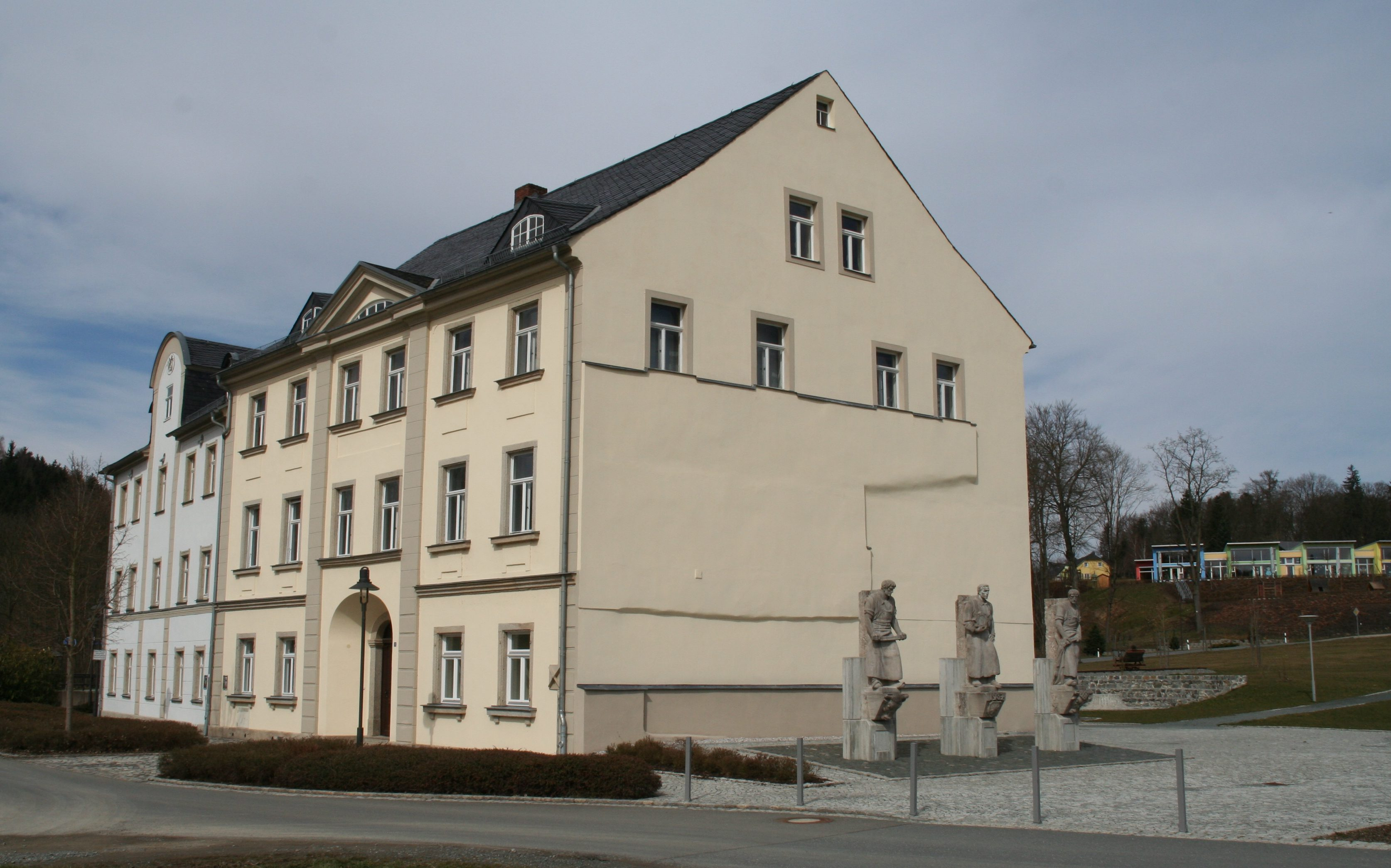
Museum of Hirschberg

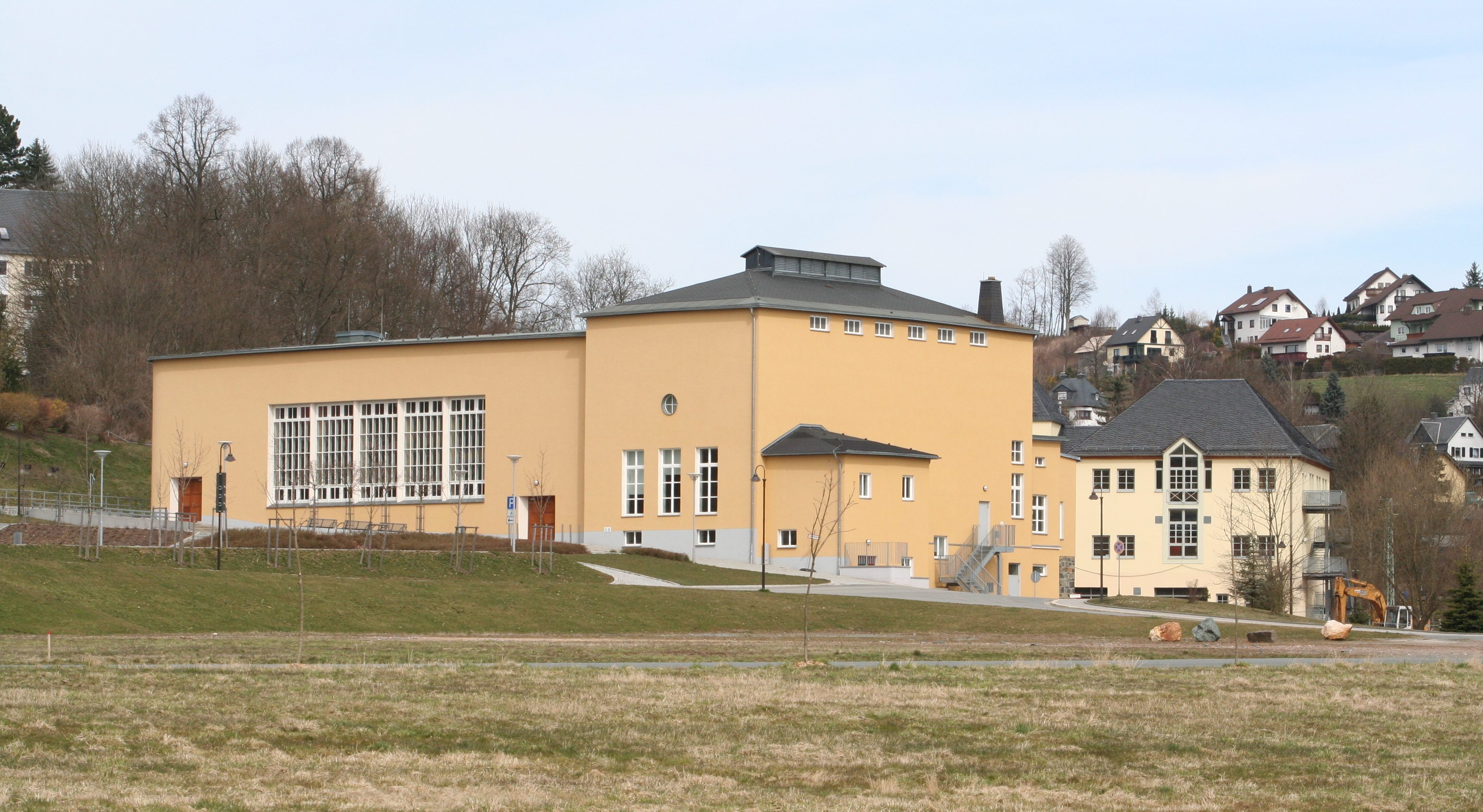
Village Hall
