= Greußen =

- Town
- Coat of arms

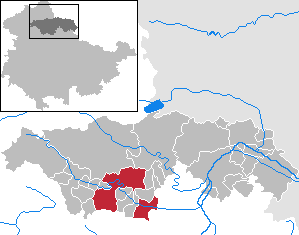
- Location of Greußen within Kyffhäuserkreis district
- Interactive map of Greußen
- Location within Germany Location within Thuringia
- Coordinates: 51°13′45″N 10°56′51″E
- Country: Germany
- State: Thuringia
- District: Kyffhäuserkreis

Government
  - Mayor (2021–27): Torsten Abicht (SPD)

Area
  - Total: 86.82 km^{2} (33.52 sq mi)
- Elevation: 162 m (531 ft)

Population (2025-12-31)
  - Total: 5,544
  - Density: 63.86/km^{2} (165.4/sq mi)
- Time zone: UTC+01:00 (CET)
  - Summer (DST): UTC+02:00 (CEST)
- Postal codes: 99718
- Dialling codes: 0 36 36
- Vehicle registration: KYF
- Website: www.vgem-greussen.de

Greußen (German pronunciation: [ˈɡʁɔʏsn̩]) is a town in the Kyffhäuserkreis district, in Thuringia, Germany. It is situated 17 km southeast of Sondershausen, and 29 km north of Erfurt. In January 2021 it absorbed the former municipalities Großenehrich and Wolferschwenda.
