= Volker Strübing =

German book author and songwriter (born 1971)

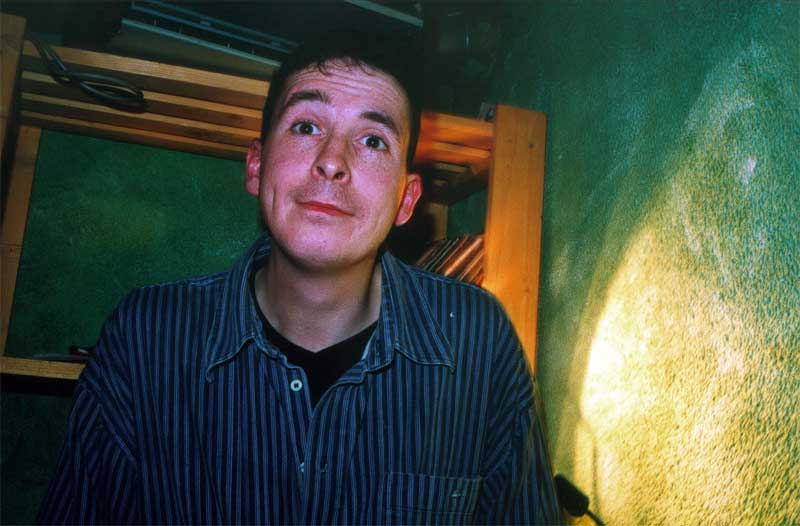
Volker Strübing in 2001

Volker Strübing (born 22 April 1971 in Sondershausen, Thuringia) is a German book author and songwriter.

== Work ==
Since 2004 he performs regularly at poetry slams as solo act or as part of Team LSD (ca-performing with Michael Ebeling).

His main focus are short satirical texts written expressly for being read to an audience.

== Awards ==
In October 2005 he was awarded the Slam2005 in Leipzig, which certifies him slam mastery on national the scale. His Das Paradies am Rande der Stadt reached second place at Deutscher Science Fiction Preis 2006 in the competition for best novel.

In November 2006 Michael Ebeling and Volker Strübing were awarded the Slam2006 best team award as Team LSD in Munich. In 2008, Volker Strübing gained 3rd place in the final round for Stuttgarter Besen, an award specifically for next generation cabaret artists.
