= Sparnberg =

- Ortsteil of Hirschberg
- Interactive map of Sparnberg
- Location within Germany Location within Thuringia
- Coordinates: 50°24′46″N 11°46′16″E
- Country: Germany
- State: Thuringia
- District: Saale-Orla-Kreis
- Town: Hirschberg

Area
  - Total: 3.3 km^{2} (1.3 sq mi)

Population (2005)
  - Total: 160
  - Density: 48/km^{2} (130/sq mi)
- Time zone: UTC+01:00 (CET)
  - Summer (DST): UTC+02:00 (CEST)

Sparnberg is a village in Thuringia, Germany. It was an independent municipality until 1994, when it became a district of the town Hirschberg. It is situated on the right bank of the river Saale, at 440 m above sea level. It has an area of about 333 hectares. Sparnberg counted about 160 residents in 2005.

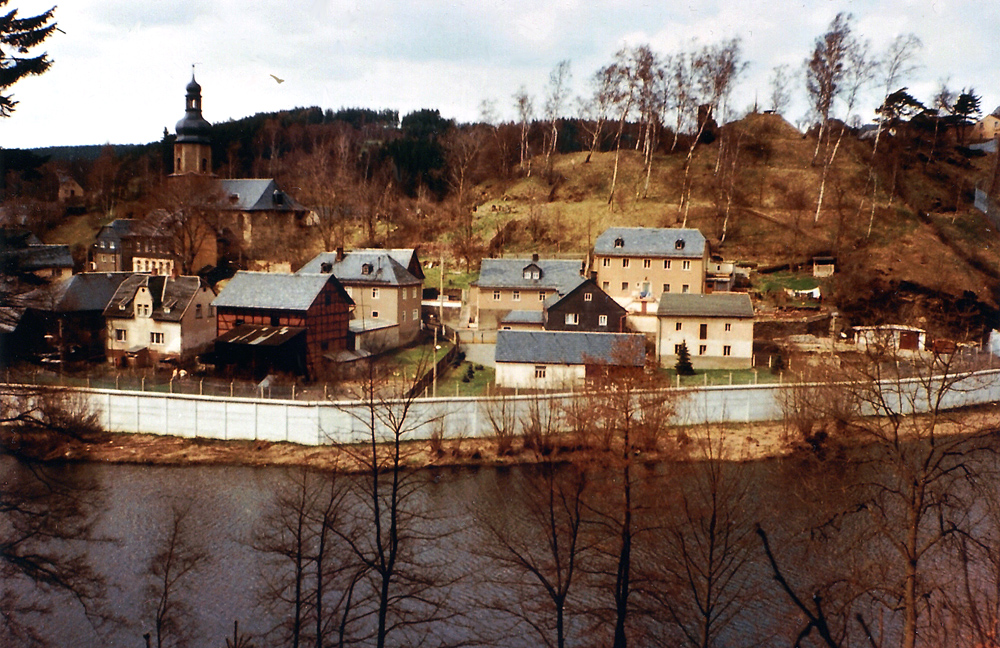
Sparnberg in the 1980s, surrounded by an East German border wall

From 1949 to 1990 the Saale formed the border between East (GDR) and West Germany (FRG) here, with Sparnberg on the GDR side.
