= Tanna, Germany =

Tanna
- Town
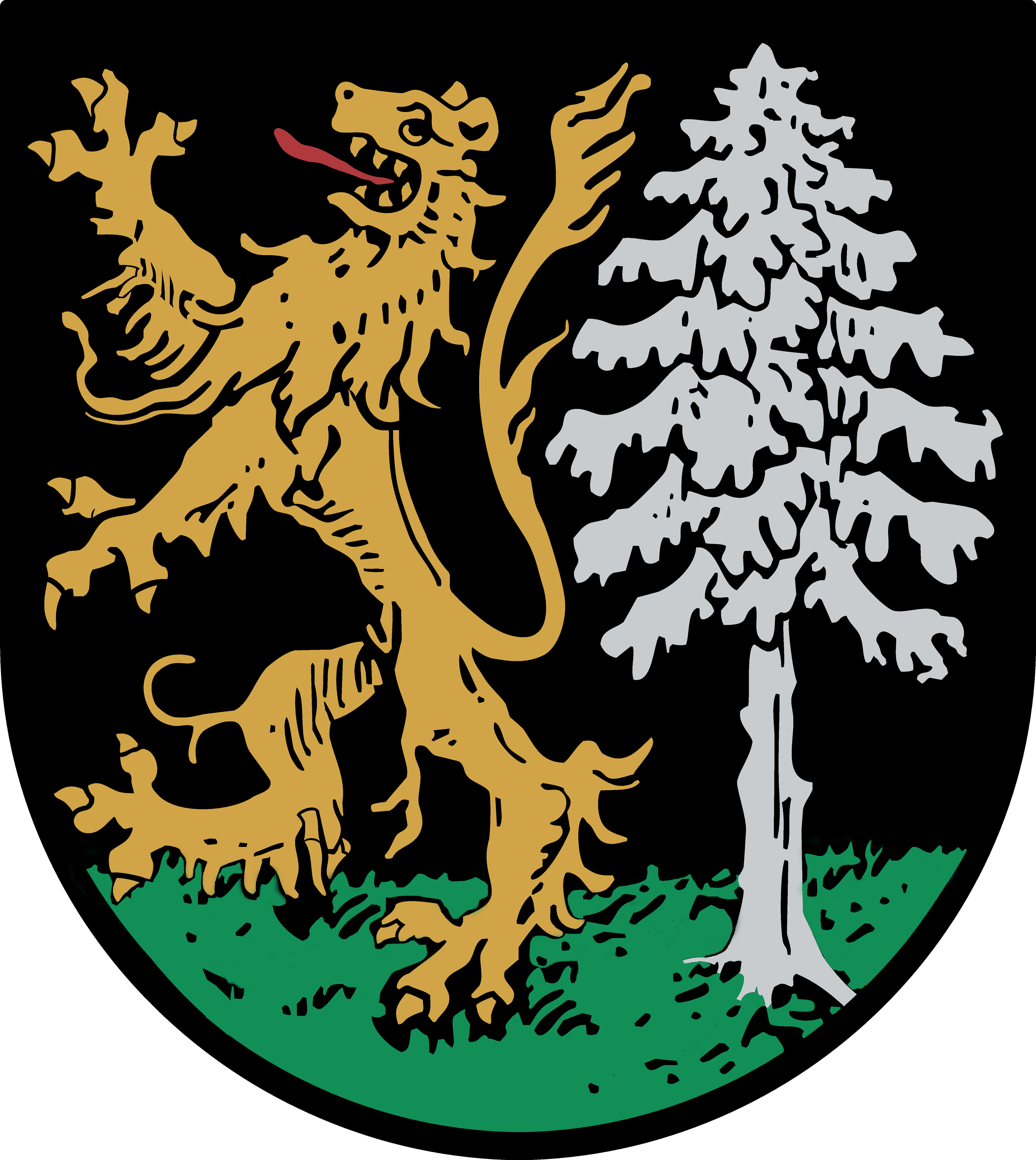
- Coat of arms

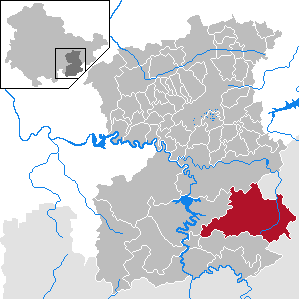
- Location of Tanna within Saale-Orla-Kreis district
- Interactive map of Tanna
- Location within Germany Location within Thuringia
- Coordinates: 50°29′40″N 11°51′40″E
- Country: Germany
- State: Thuringia
- District: Saale-Orla-Kreis

Government
  - Mayor (2021–27): Marco Seidel

Area
  - Total: 87.35 km^{2} (33.73 sq mi)
- Elevation: 542 m (1,778 ft)

Population (2025-12-31)
  - Total: 3,304
  - Density: 37.82/km^{2} (97.97/sq mi)
- Time zone: UTC+01:00 (CET)
  - Summer (DST): UTC+02:00 (CEST)
- Postal codes: 07922
- Dialling codes: 036646
- Vehicle registration: SOK
- Website: www.stadt-tanna.de

Tanna (German pronunciation: [ˈtana]) is a city in Thuringia, in the district of Saale-Orla-Kreis. It is located about 10 km south of Schleiz. Tanna was founded in 1495. The musicologist Paul Willert (1901–1988) was born in the city.

== History ==
Within the German Empire (1871-1918), Tanna was part of the Principality of Reuss-Gera.

== Population growth ==
Historical population (from 1994 December 31):

- 1833 - 1390
- 1910 - 2032
- 1933 - 2192
- 1939 - 2045
- 1994 - 2313
- 1995 - 2309
- 1996 - 2352
- 1997 - 4495
- 1998 - 4450
- 1999 - 4347
- 2000 - 4330
- 2001 - 4264
- 2002 - 4264
- 2003 - 4229
- 2004 - 4106
- 2005 - 4073
- 2006 - 4039
- 2007 - 4023
- 2008 - 3998
- 2009 - 3938

Statistics since 1994: Thüringer Landesamt für Statistik
