= Wismar Theatre =

German theatre

Coordinates: 53.8892°N 11.4453°E

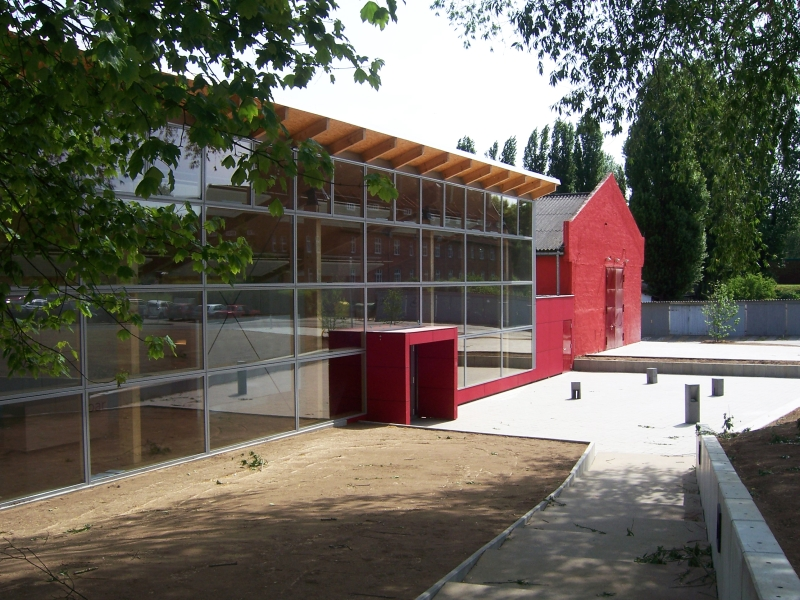
The new foyer

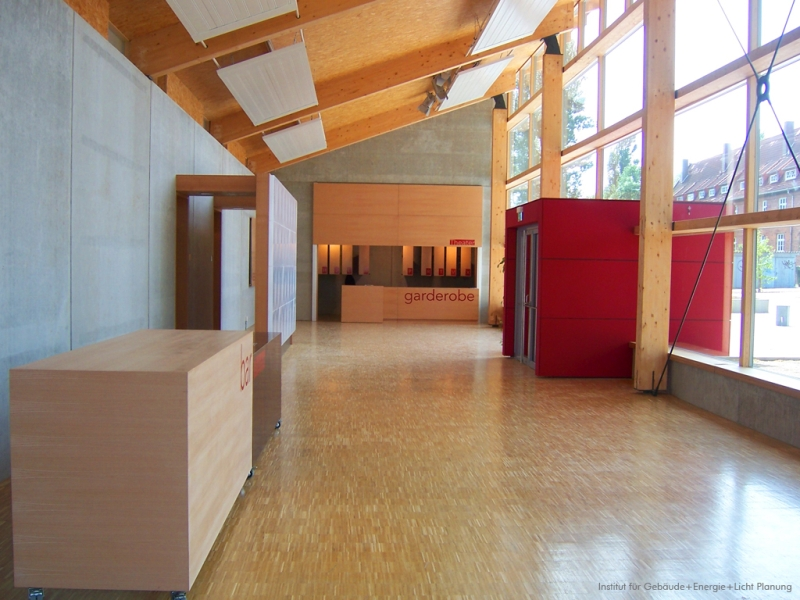
The foyer, interior view

The Wismar Theatre (German: Theater Wismar) is located on the site of the University of Wismar on Phillip-Müller-Straße in the Hanseatic Town of Wismar .

== Literature ==
- Stadtbibliothek Schwerin: „Was ich von Wismar weiß“ von Jürgen Borchert
- Stadtarchiv Schwerin: Wismarer Theatergeschichte durch die Jahrhunderte von Leo Martens (aus der Festschrift 725 Jahre Wismar)
- Theater Wismar: „50 Jahre Theater der Hansestadt Wismar“ von Ulf Manhenke
