= Langewiesen =

- Stadtteil of Ilmenau
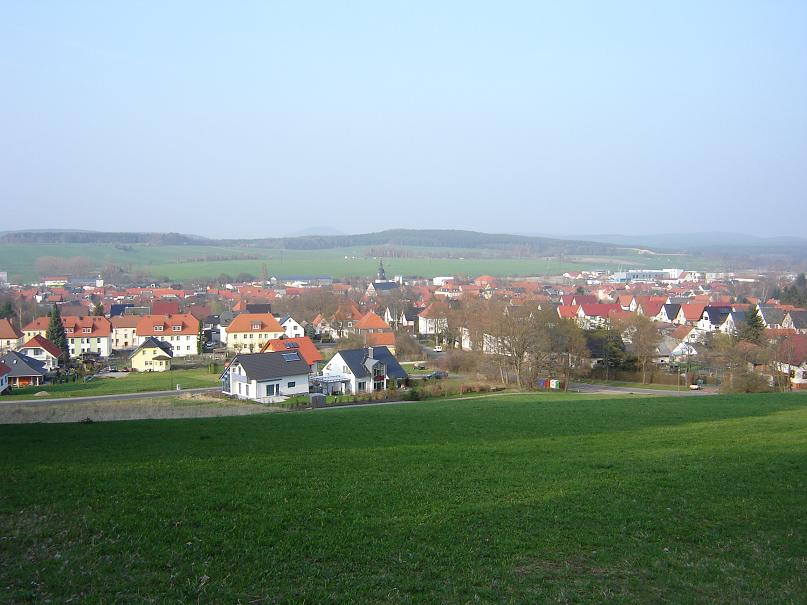
- Langewiesen

- Coat of arms
- Interactive map of Langewiesen
- Location within Germany Location within Thuringia
- Coordinates: 50°40′18″N 10°58′28″E
- Country: Germany
- State: Thuringia
- District: Ilm-Kreis
- Town: Ilmenau

Area
  - Total: 27.51 km^{2} (10.62 sq mi)
- Elevation: 454 m (1,490 ft)

Population (2016-12-31)
  - Total: 3,544
  - Density: 128.8/km^{2} (333.7/sq mi)
- Time zone: UTC+01:00 (CET)
  - Summer (DST): UTC+02:00 (CEST)
- Postal codes: 98704
- Dialling codes: 03677
- Vehicle registration: IK
- Website: www.langewiesen.de

Langewiesen (German pronunciation: [ˈlaŋəˌviːzn̩]) is a town and a former municipality in the Ilm-Kreis district, in Thuringia, Germany. Since July 2018, it is part of the town Ilmenau. It is situated on the river Ilm, 4 km southeast of Ilmenau.
