= Sondershausen =

- Town
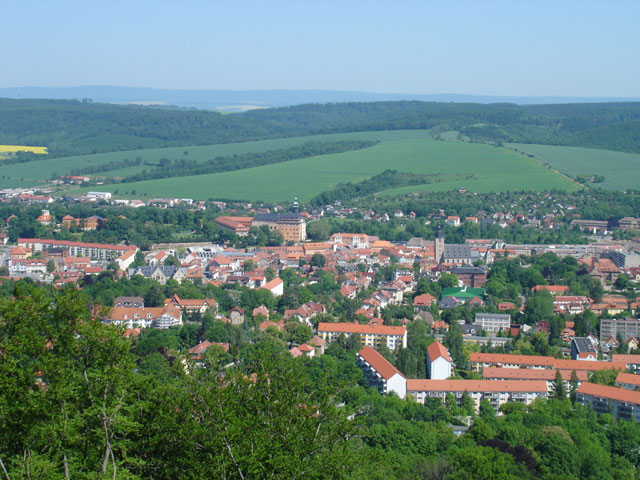

- Coat of arms

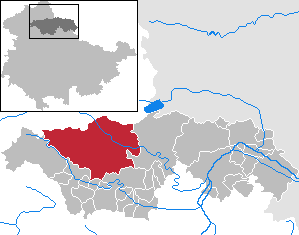
- Location of Sondershausen within Kyffhäuserkreis district
- Interactive map of Sondershausen
- Location within Germany Location within Thuringia
- Coordinates: 51°22′N 10°52′E
- Country: Germany
- State: Thuringia
- District: Kyffhäuserkreis
- Subdivisions: 12

Government
  - Mayor (2024–30): Steffen Grimm (Ind.)

Area
  - Total: 201.21 km^{2} (77.69 sq mi)
- Elevation: 208 m (682 ft)

Population (2025-12-31)
  - Total: 20,910
  - Density: 103.9/km^{2} (269.2/sq mi)
- Time zone: UTC+01:00 (CET)
  - Summer (DST): UTC+02:00 (CEST)
- Postal codes: 99701–99706
- Dialling codes: 03632
- Vehicle registration: KYF, ART, SDH
- Website: www.sondershausen.de

Sondershausen (German pronunciation: [ˈzɔndɐsˌhaʊzn̩]) is a town in Thuringia, central Germany, capital of the Kyffhäuserkreis district, situated about 50 km (30 mi) north of Erfurt. On 1 December 2007, the former municipality Schernberg was merged with Sondershausen.

Until 1918 it was part of the principality of Schwarzburg-Sondershausen.

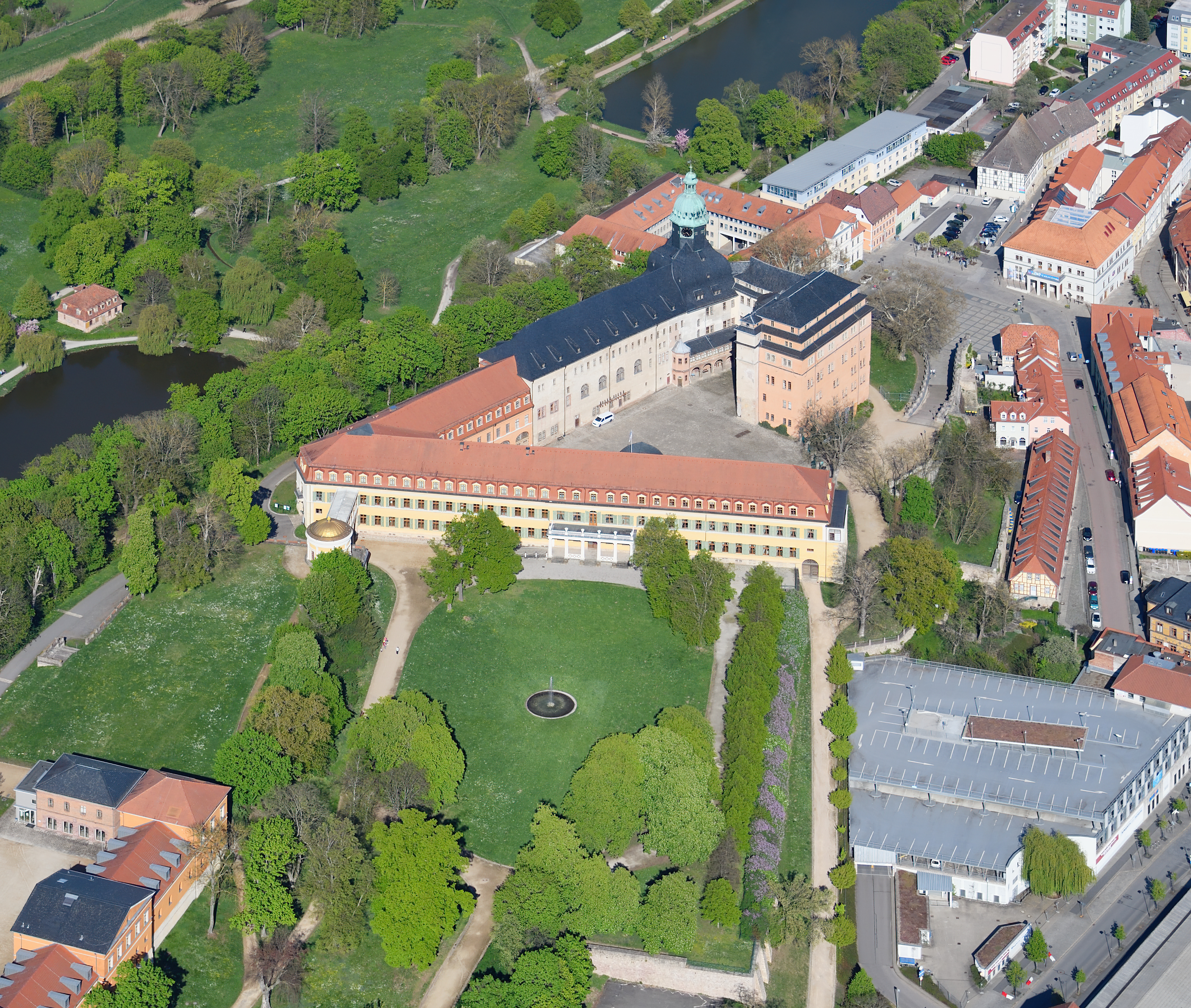
Sondershausen Palace

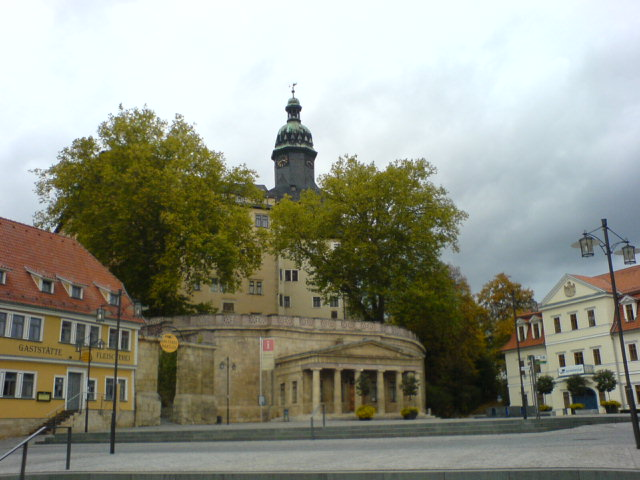
Marketplace with "Alte Wache" and castle

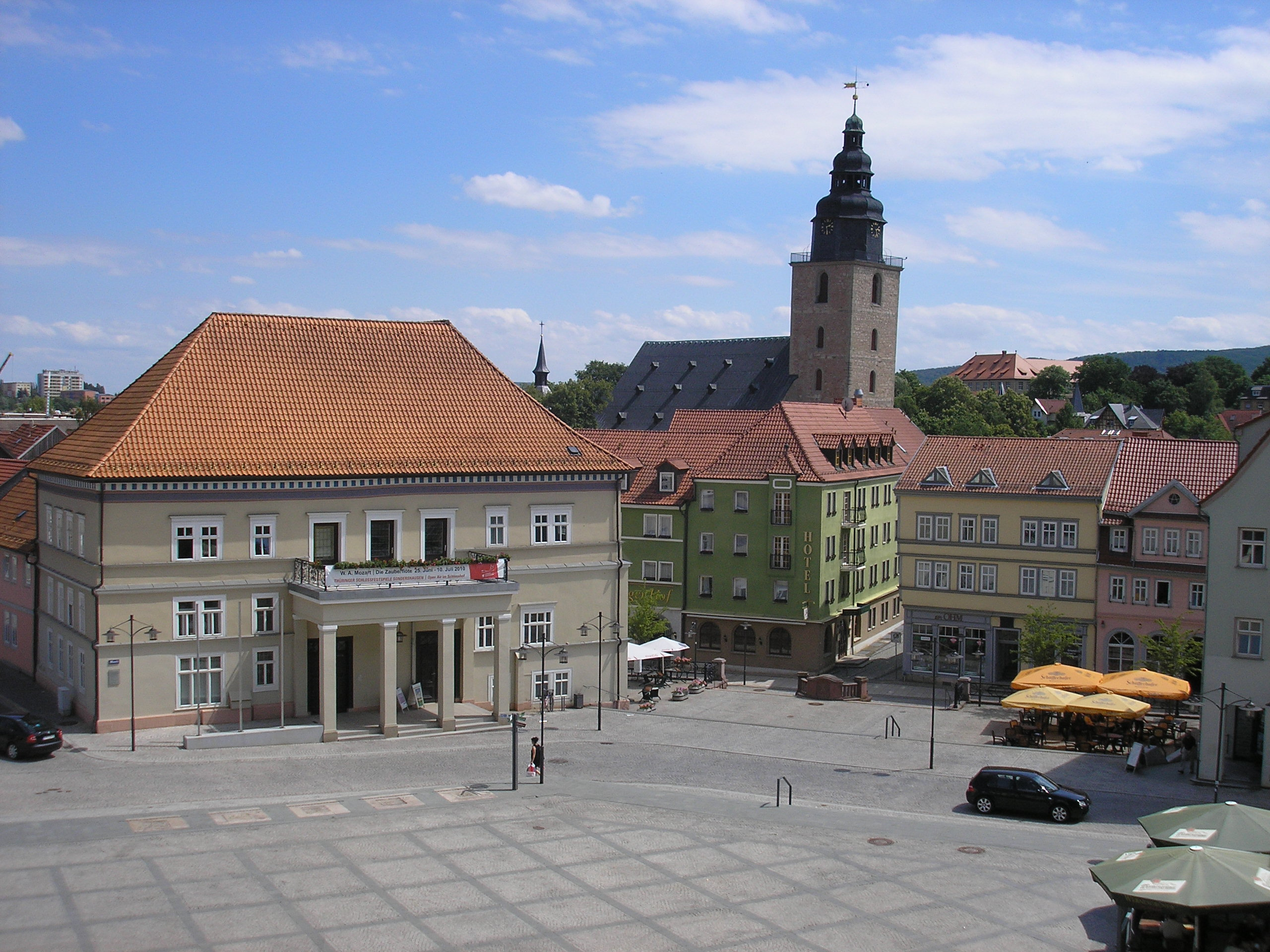
View over the marketplace

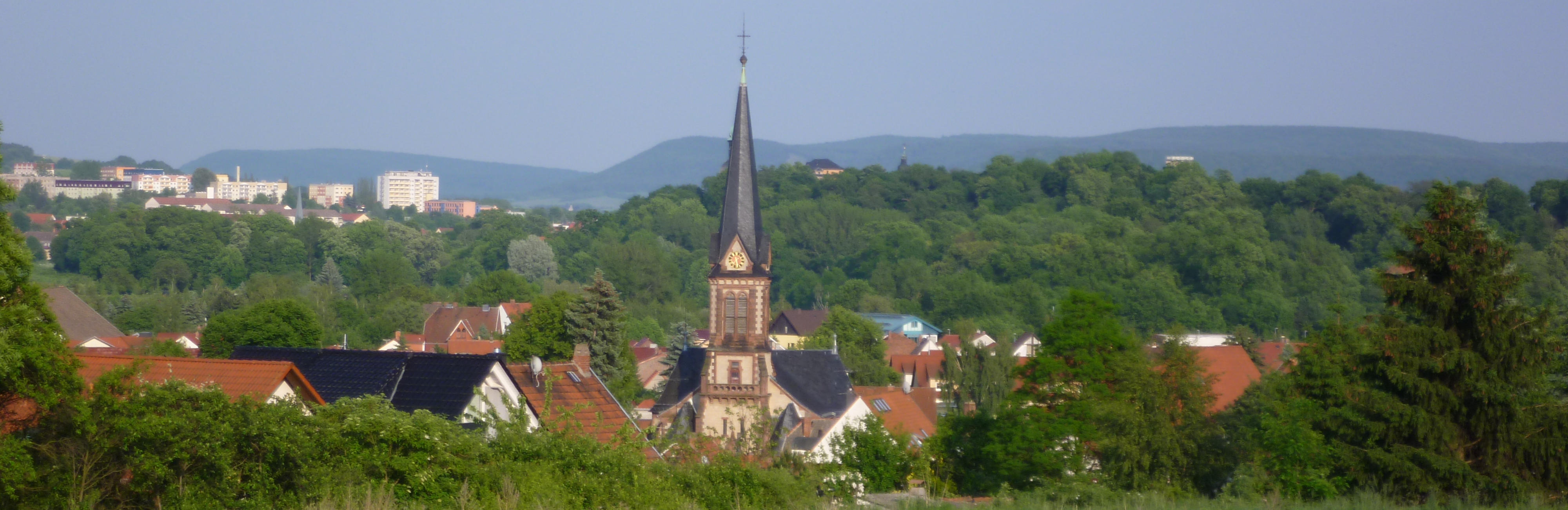
Look over the town, Stockhausen

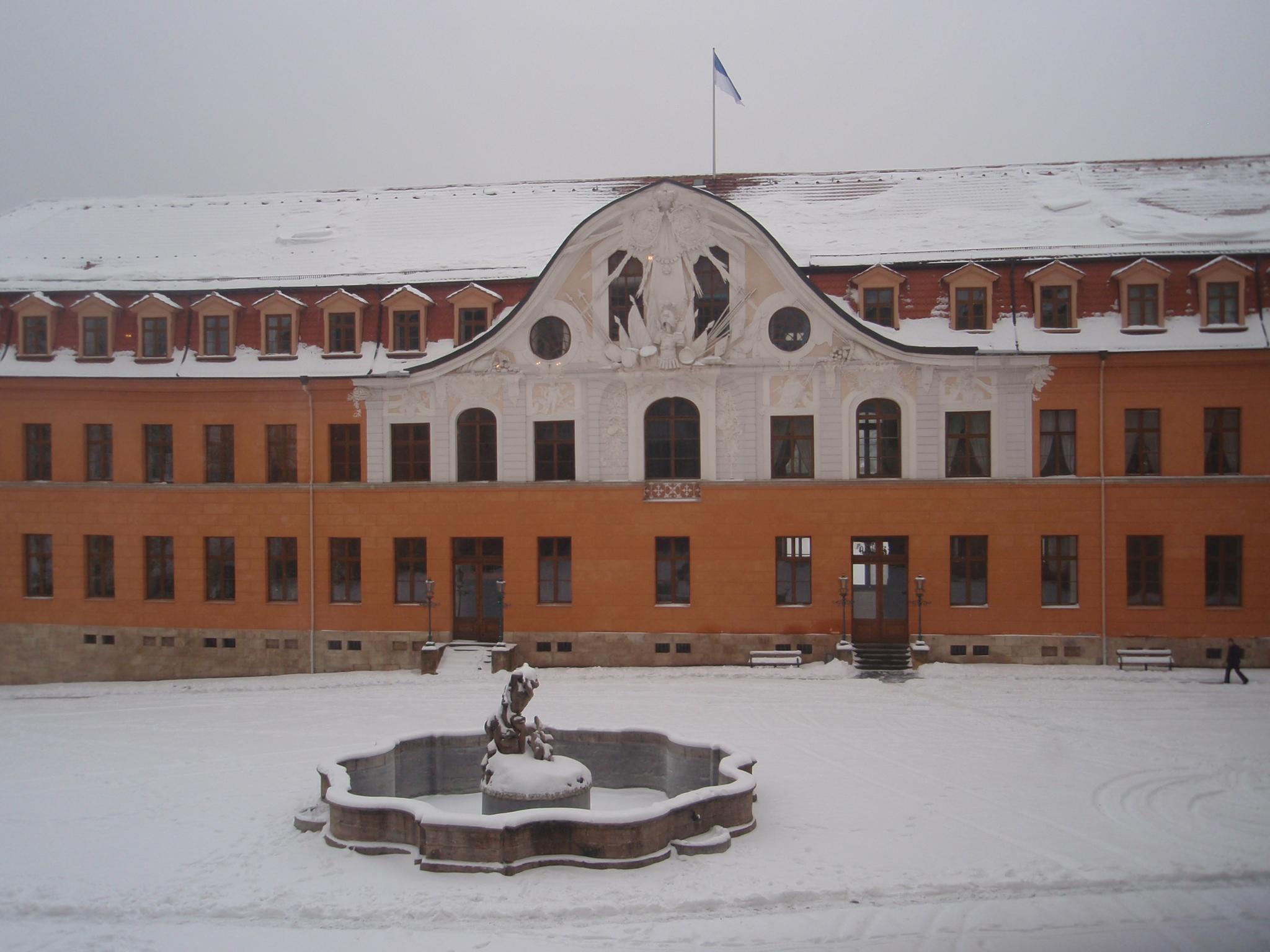
Palace

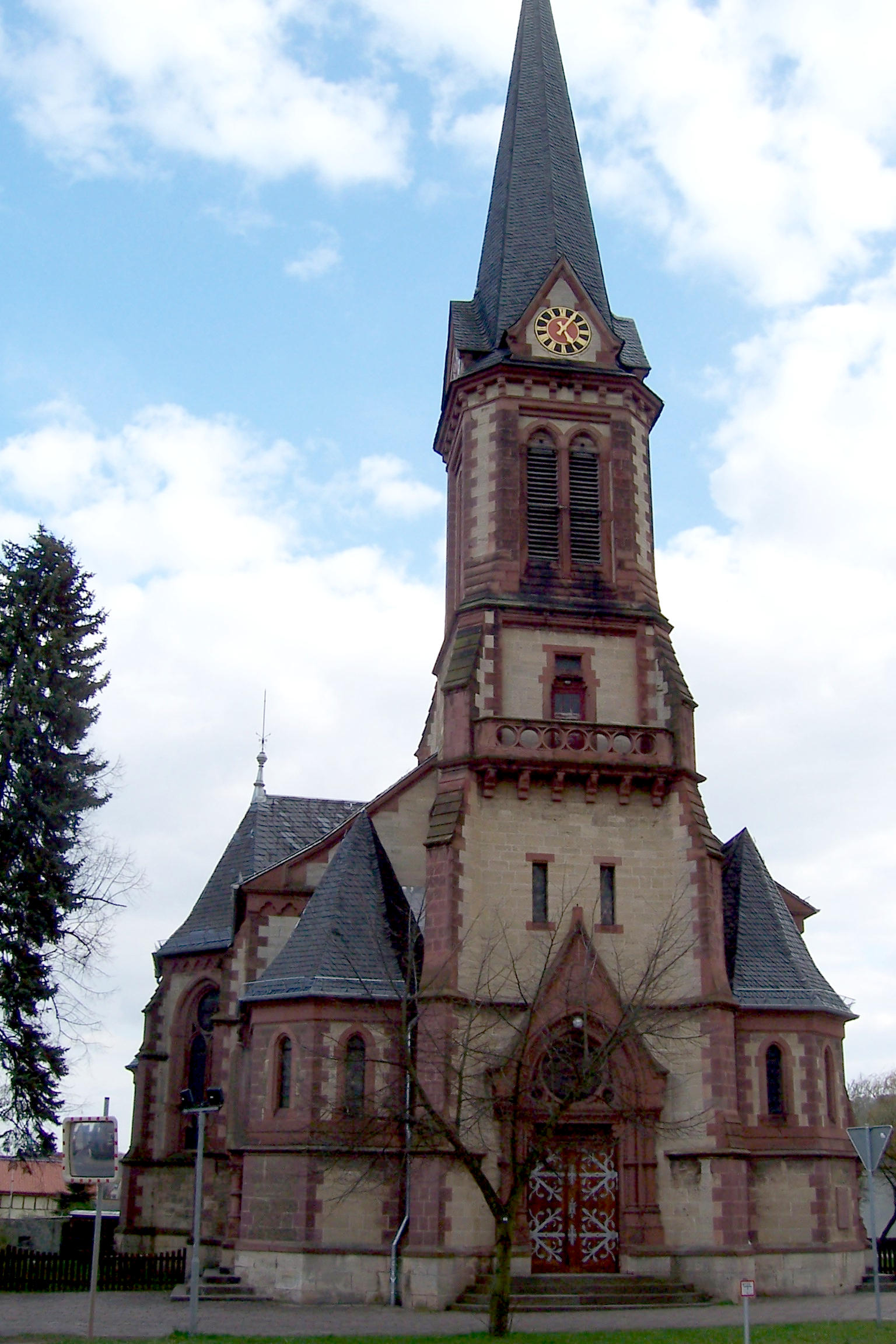
St. Matthias Church in Stockhausen

== Geography ==
Sondershausen is situated in North Thuringia and lies in a low mountain range between Hainleite (in the north) and Windleite (in the south). The highest mountain is the Frauenberg to the west of the town. A little river called Wipper flows through Sondershausen. The town is surrounded by mixed forests, dominated by beech.

=== Subdivisions ===
The city districts are:

- City centre
- Borntal
- Hasenholz
- Östertal
- Bebra
- Berka
- Großfurra
- Jecha
- Jechaburg
- Stockhausen
- Großberndten
- Himmelsberg
- Hohenebra
- Immenrode
- Kleinberndten
- Schernberg
- Straußberg
- Thalebra

== Culture and main sights ==
=== Museums ===
Sondershausen Palace houses a large museum with three different exhibit areas. Special exhibits are Golden Coach, the only one of its kind in Germany, and the legendary bronze figurine Püstrich von Sondershausen. There are special guided tours of the palace's storage depot, cellar, tower, and park.

Other places of interest include a former mine under the city, and a Jewish bath from the 14th century.

=== Buildings ===
- Sondershausen Palace, with natural history and antiquarian collections. Built as a palace during the Renaissance, expanding from an earlier fort, it was later expanded further in a Baroque style (1764–1771). Especially noteworthy are the "Blue Hall" and the gardens.
- The previous Princes' Palace (1721–1725), a residence of the princes from 1835 to 1851. It currently houses the district administration office of the Kyffhäuserkreis.
- The "Octagonal House"
- "Alte Wache"
- Main building of the "Geschwister-Scholl-Gymnasium Sondershausen" (a grammar school)
- A mikveh
- "Haus der Kunst" ("House of the Arts") theatre
- Rathaus (city hall)
- Gottschalcksches Haus (House of Gottschalck)

==== Churches ====
- The Baroque Trinitatiskirche, a Lutheran church with a mausoleum containing the graves of the last members of the princely family
- Crucis Church, the oldest building in Sondershausen
- St. Matthias Church, a historical structure considered one of the most beautiful churches in the region
- St. Petri Church in Jechaburg
- St. Georg Church in Bebra
- St. Viti Church in Berka
- St. Bonifatius Church in Großfurra
- St. Johannis Church in Oberspier
- Church of Großberndten
- Church St. Mauritii in Himmelsberg
- Church Gloria Deo in Hohenebra
- Church of Immenrode
- Church St. Johannes in Kleinberndten
- St. Crucis Church in Schernberg
- Church of Thalebra
- St. Elisabeth Church (catholic)

== Notable people ==
- Rudolf Arzinger (1922–1970), expert of public international law
- Felix Becker (1864–1928), art historian
- Regina Miriam Bloch (1888–1938), writer and poet
- Johann Günther Friedrich Cannabich (1777–1859), geographer
- Edmund Döring (1860–1938), German homeland culture ("Heimat") historian
- Ernst Christoph Dressler (1734–1779), composer, operatic tenor, violinist and music theorist
- Ernst Ludwig Gerber (1746–1819), composer, music writer, musician
- Jörg Hoffmann (born 1963), luger, Olympic champion in Calgary 1988
- Thilo Irmisch (1816–1878), botanist
- Günther Jahn (painter) (born 1933), painter
- Michael Kohl (1929–1981), lawyer, East German deputy foreign minister
- Olaf Koch (conductor) (born 1932), director of the Hochschule für Musik Hanns Eisler Berlin
- Karl Krieghoff (1905–1984), local poet
- Vera Lengsfeld (born 1952), politician
- Georg Richard Lewin (1820–1896), dermatologist, university professor
- Kurt Lindner (1906–1987), hunting historian
- Valentin Ernst Löscher (1674–1749), theologian, writer
- Günther Lutze (1840–1930), botanist, German homeland culture ("Heimat") historian, chronicler
- Joachim Manard (Manhard, Manardt) (1564–1637), chronicler of the town
- Ludwig Günther Martini (1647–1719), jurist
- Curt Mücke (1885–1940), painter
- Carl Moeller (German pastor) (1867–1920), pastor and German homeland culture ("Heimat") historian
- Hermann Müller (1891–1984), German homeland culture ("Heimat") historian
- Gunda Niemann-Stirnemann (born 1966), speed skater
- Ronald Paris (1933–2021), painter
- Werner Schubert (1921–1991), painter
- Heinz Scharr (born 1924), visual artist
- Ferdinand Schlufter (1871–1948), major
- Volker Strübing (born 1971), book author, cabaret artist and songwriter
- Johann Friedrich Suckow (1769–1842), musician
- Johann Karl Wezel (1747–1819), poet

== Sister cities ==
Sondershausen is twinned with three cities:

- Rolla, Missouri, United States
- Pecquencourt, France
- Kazlų Rūda, Lithuania
