= Kyffhäuserkreis =

Coordinates: 51°20′N 10°55′E

- District
- Flag Coat of arms
- Country: Germany
- State: Thuringia
- Capital: Sondershausen

Government
  - District admin.: Antje Hochwind (SPD)

Area
  - Total: 1,037.91 km^{2} (400.74 sq mi)

Population (31 December 2022)
  - Total: 73,690
  - Density: 71/km^{2} (180/sq mi)
- Time zone: UTC+01:00 (CET)
  - Summer (DST): UTC+02:00 (CEST)
- Vehicle registration: KYF, ART, SDH
- Website: www.kyffhaeuser.de

The Kyffhäuserkreis is a district in the northern part of Thuringia, Germany. Neighboring districts are the districts Mansfeld-Südharz, Saalekreis and Burgenlandkreis in Saxony-Anhalt, and the districts Sömmerda, Unstrut-Hainich-Kreis and Eichsfeld.

== History ==
In the 12th century there was a castle, the Kyffhausen Castle, on the Kyffhäuser mountains, which was built during the reign of emperor Frederick I. According to the local legend, the emperor did not die, but instead went to sleep in this castle.

From 1579 on the region belonged to Saxony, and after 1815 it was divided between the Prussian Province of Saxony and Schwarzburg-Sondershausen.

In 1952 the two districts of Artern (district) and Sondershausen were established. These districts were merged in 1994, with only a few municipalities joining other districts.

=== Historical Population ===
Values as of 31 December:

- 1994: 98,785
- 1995: 98,144
- 1996: 97,499
- 1997: 96,749
- 1998: 96,135
- 1999: 95,290
- 2000: 94,343
- 2001: 92,983
- 2002: 91,940
- 2003: 90,758
- 2004: 89,517
- 2005: 88,307
- 2006: 87,058
- 2007: 85,362
- 2008: 83,835
- 2009: 82,650
- 2010: 81,449
- 2011: 80,471
- 2012: 78,618
- 2013: 77,656
- 2014: 77,148
- 2015: 77,110
- 2016: 76,685
- 2017: 75,009

Data source since 1994: Thuringian State Statistical Bureau

== Partnerships ==
The district has a partnership with the district Ahrweiler in Rhineland-Palatinate, which was initially established with the district Artern in 1990.

== Geography ==
The district is named after the Kyffhäuser mountains. The main river is the Unstrut, which flows through the east of the district.

== Coat of arms ==
The main symbol of the coat of arms is the lion of the counts of Schwarzburg, who historically ruled most of the district. The lion holds a shield which contains the coat of arms of the Counts of Mansfeld, who owned the area around Artern in the 18th century. The three green hills in the bottom symbolize the mountainous landscape with many forests, the big wavy line stands for the river Unstrut, the small one for the Wipper river.

== Towns and municipalities ==
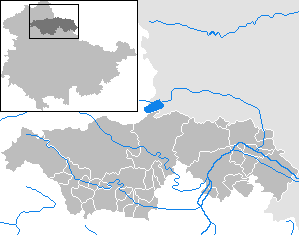
Clickable map of towns and municipalities in the district

Verwaltungsgemeinschaft-free towns
and municipalities
1. An der Schmücke
2. Artern
3. Bad Frankenhausen
4. Ebeleben
5. Greußen
6. Roßleben-Wiehe
7. Sondershausen
1. Abtsbessingen
2. Bellstedt
3. Borxleben
4. Etzleben
5. Freienbessingen
6. Gehofen
7. Helbedündorf
8. Holzsußra
9. Kalbsrieth
10. Kyffhäuserland
11. Mönchpfiffel-Nikolausrieth
12. Oberheldrungen
13. Reinsdorf
14. Rockstedt

Verwaltungsgemeinschaft

1. Greußen
[seat: Greußen]

1. Clingen^{2}
2. Niederbösa
3. Oberbösa
4. Topfstedt
5. Trebra
6. Wasserthaleben
7. Westgreußen
^{1}seat of the Verwaltungsgemeinschaft;^{2}town

Further information on the former Verwaltungsgemeinschaft: Kyffhäuser
