= Ohm Hills =

Range of hills in Thuringia, Germany

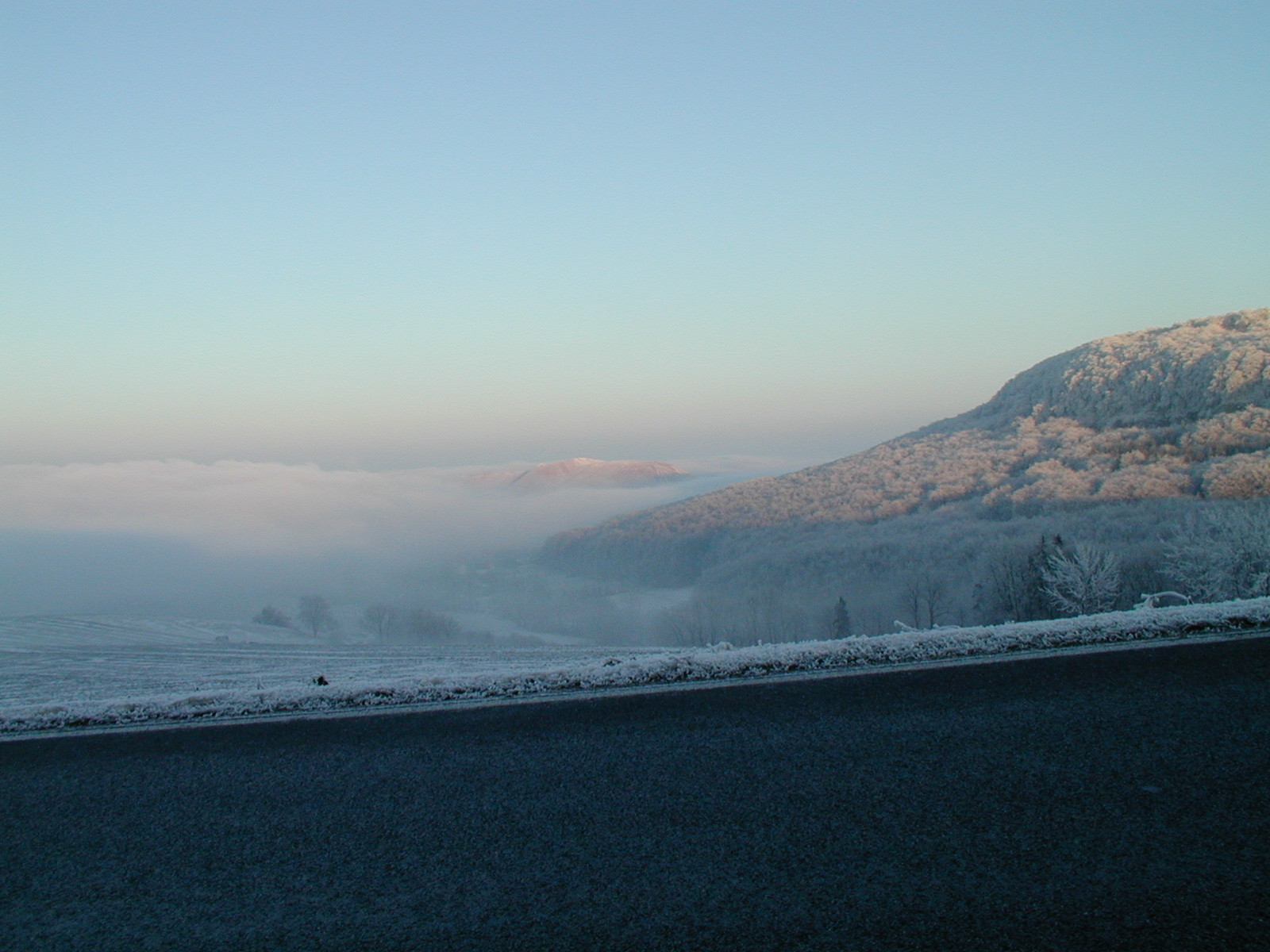
- Northern spur of the Ohm Hills immediately south of Holungen

Highest point
- Peak: Birkenberg
- Elevation: 533.4 m above NN

Dimensions
- Area: 50 km^{2} (19 mi^{2})

Geography
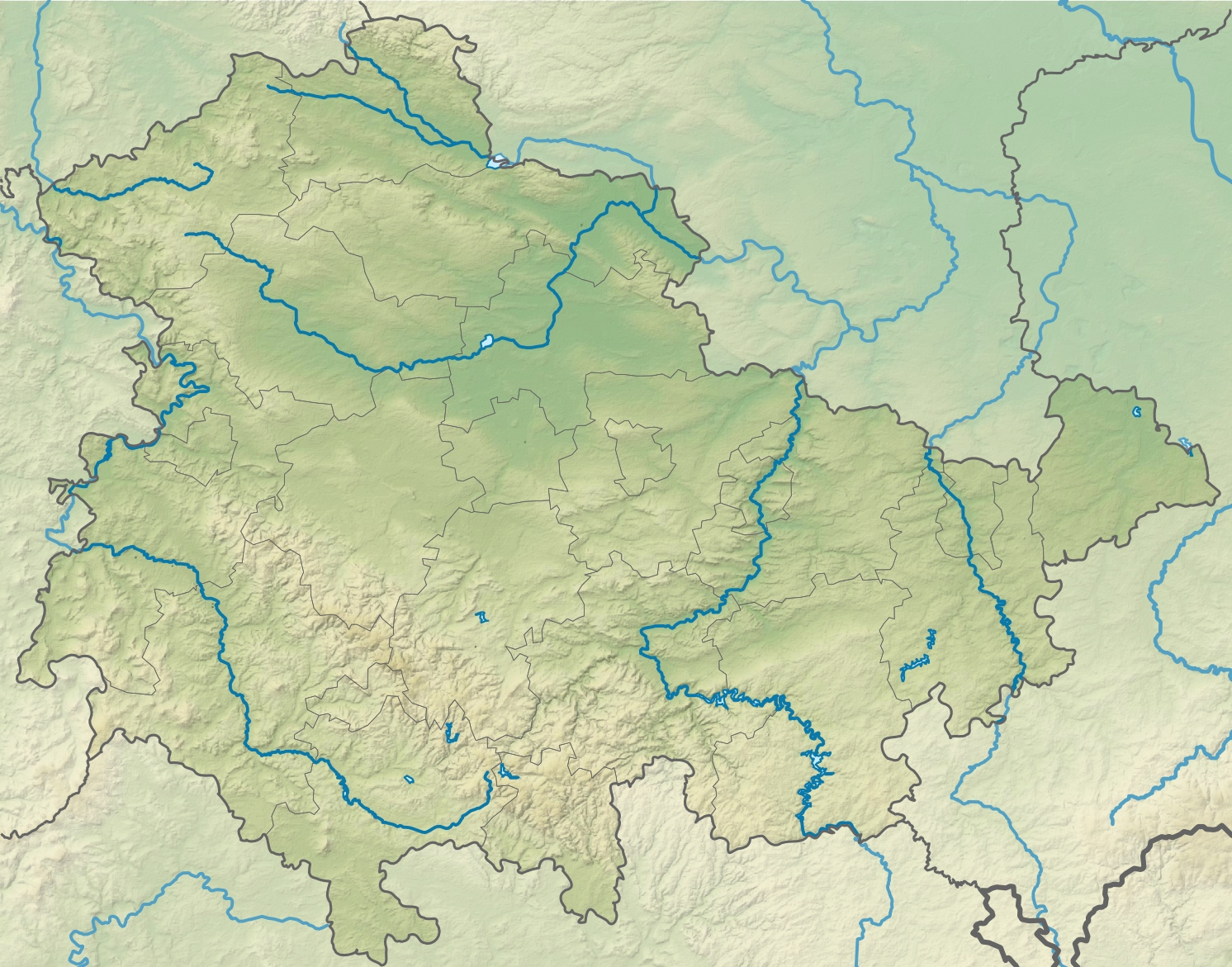
- Location within Thuringia
- Location: County of Eichsfeld, Thuringia, Germany
- Range coordinates: 51°28′15″N 10°20′20″E
- Parent range: Lower Eichsfeld, Weser-Leine Uplands

Geology
- Rock type: muschelkalk

The Ohm Hills (German: Ohmgebirge, pronounced [ˈoːmɡəˌbɪʁɡə]) are a small range of hills up to 533.4 m above sea level (NN) high and about 50 km² in area. They are part of the Lower Eichsfeld region and are located in the county of Eichsfeld, North Thuringia, Germany.

== Geography ==
The Ohm Hills, most of which are densely wooded, whose southeastern foothills form the Bleicherode Hills, lie in the county of Eichsfeld on its boundary with Nordhausen. They are located between Weißenborn-Lüderode to the north, Bleicherode to the southeast, Worbis to the south and Teistungen to the west, and extend from the upper reaches of the River Helme in the north to the Wipper in the south. To the north and west the range is adjoined by historic landscape of the Lower Eichsfeld (Untereichsfeld), further south is the ridge of the Dün and to the southwest the Eichsfeld-Hainich-Werra Valley Nature Park.

== Natural region classification ==
According to "Kassel map" of the natural regional classification of Germany the Ohm Hills are grouped as follows:

- (to 37 Weser-Leine Uplands, Lower Saxon Hills)
  - (375 Lower Eichsfeld)
    - 375.2 Ohm Hills and Bleicherode Hills

The Thuringian State office for the Environment and Geology uses a rather coarser, self-published, region classification, within which the landscape of "Ohm Hills-Bleicherode Hills" is enclosed by the landscape unit "North Thuringian Buntsandstein Land".

The muschelkalk ridges of the Ohm Hills and Bleicherode Hills are shown in both classifications as one contiguous natural region. They appear as a continuation of the hills fringing the northwestern perimeter of the Thuringian Basin interrupted only by the Lower Eichsfeld lowland.

Neighbouring natural regions listed clockwise are:

- Lower Eichsfeld including the Eichsfeld Bowl (Eichsfelder Kessel) to the south and the Zehnsberg to the west
- Eichsfeld Basin (Eichsfelder Becken) with the Duderstadt Basin to the northwest and the hill country of the Hellberge to the north
- Silkerode Hills on the far side of the Geroder Eller to the northeast
- North Thuringian Hills to the east

== Hills ==
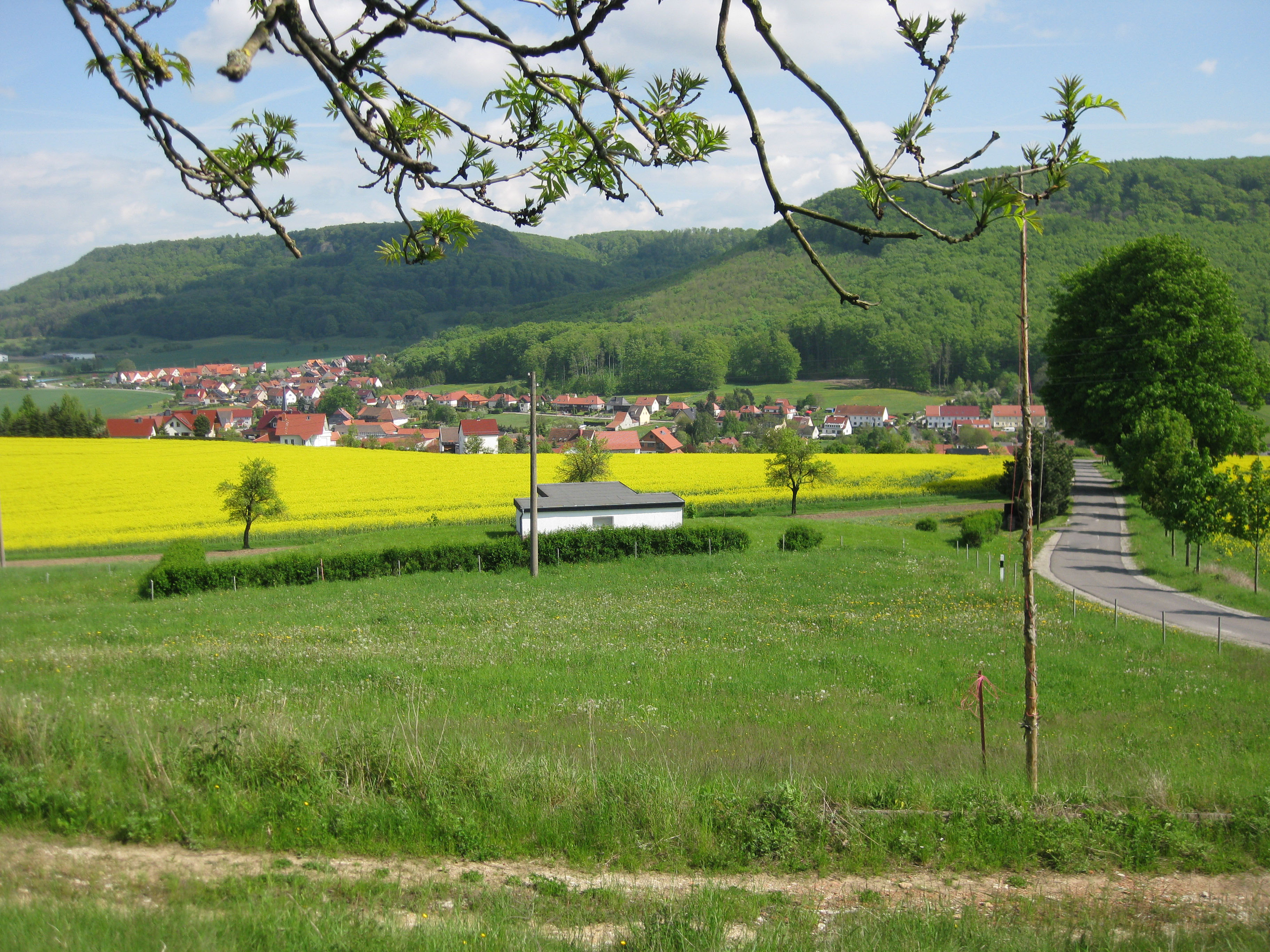
The Ohmberg (left) and the Sonder (right) on the northeastern edge of the Ohm Hills

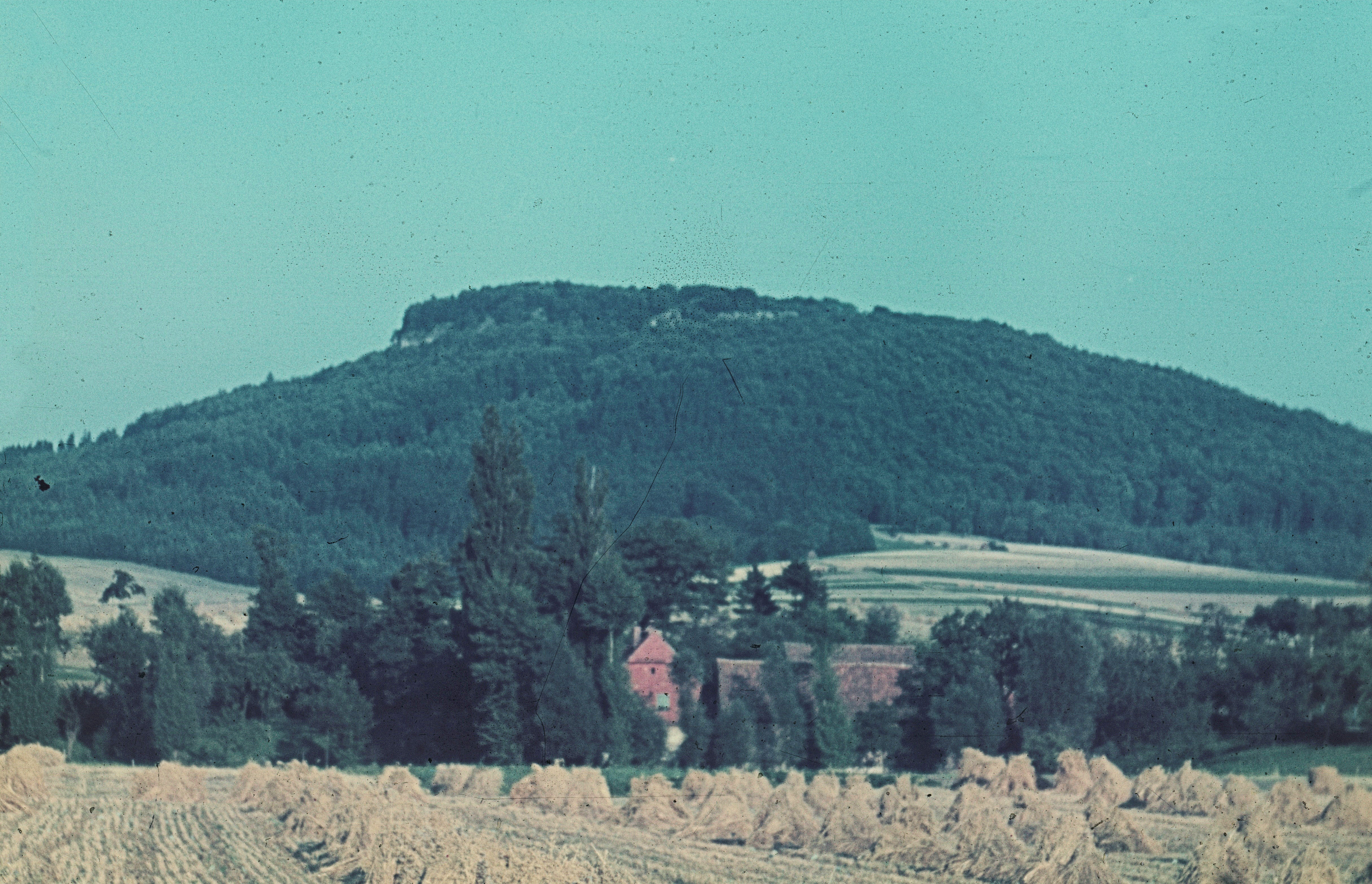
The Hasenburg near Haynrode

The following hills and high points belong to the Ohm Hills in its narrower sense and its foothills to the north and east, which are considered part of neighbouring natural regions, with elevations in metres above sea level (NN):

- Birkenberg (533.4 m), highest point of the Ohm Hills and a good lookout point north of Kaltohmfeld
- Bornberg (529.7 m), north of Kirchohmfeld
- Ohmberg (528.7 m), west of Hauröden
- Kälberberg (524.7 m), south of Kaltohmfeld
  - Oberberg (496.5 m)
  - Mittelberg (449.9 m)
- Ochsenberg (514.6 m), west of Kaltohmfeld
- Sonder (512.9 m), south of Holungen
- Trogberg (502.9 m), southeast of Wehnde
- Oberberg (496.5 m), northeast of Worbis
- Schwarzenberg (491.4 m), southeast of Brehme
- Hasenburg (487.4 m), southeast of Zeugenberg, north of Buhla
- Sonnenstein (485.6 m), northwest of Holungen
- Mittelberg (475.8 m), further north of Wintzingerode
- Heinrichsberg (478.4 m), northwest of Kirchohmfeld
- Himberg (474.0 m), west of Haynrode
- Mittelberg (465.9 m), between Kaltohmfeld und Breitenworbis
- Fernstein (464.0 m), east of Ferna
- Langenberg (462.6 m), north of Kirchworbis
- Ziegenrück (460,8 m), highest point of in the Bleicherode Hills, south of Buhla
- Haferberg (460.7 m), east of Kirchohmfeld
- Krantberg (455,6 m), north of Holungen
- Haarburg (453.1 m), southeastern Zeugenberg, southeast of Haynrode
  - Wehenberg (440.8 m)
- Kanstein (435,5 m), northwest of Worbis
- Rottersberg (420.6 m), northwest of Worbis
- Winkelberg (415.2 m), east of Jützenbach
- Die Hardt (400,9 m), north of Worbis
- Großer Heuberg (389.0 m), northwest of Bischofferode
- Steinberg (385.8 m), eastern spur, west of Werningerode (municipality of Steinrode)
- Buchenberg (383.5 m), northeast of Brehme
- Bauerberg (361.6 m), eastern spur, east of Werningerode (boundary with county of Nordhausen)
- Stadtberg (351.2 m), northern spur, southwest of Jützenbach
- Hühnerberg (349.9 m), eastern spur, south of Bischofferode
- Sommerberg (342.1 m), northern spur, north of Brehme
- Nonnecke (338.5 m), northwestern spur, west of Wehnde

== Rivers and streams ==
The rivers and streams in the Ohm Hills include the:

- Hahle, rises at the southern edge of the Ohm Hills in Worbis, passes to the south, southern tributary of the Rhume
- Helme, rises in the northern foothills of the Ohm Hills, leaves them head east, western tributary of the Unstrut
- Wipper, rises on the southern edge of the Ohm Hills in Worbis, passes them to the east, western tributary of the Unstrut
- Bode, rises in the Ohm Hills, leaves them heading east, southwestern tributary of the Wipper

The Elbe-Weser Watershed runs through the Ohm Hills. Whilst the Hahle is part of the catchment area of the Leine and Weser rivers, the Bode, Helme and Wipper are in the Elbe's drainage basin.

== Settlements ==
The settlements in and on the edge of the Ohm Hills include:

- Bischofferode (in the north)
- Bleicherode (südeast)
- Breitenworbis (south)
- Brehme
- Buhla (in the central south)
- Ecklingerode (northwest)
- Ferna (southwest)
- Großbodungen (in the northeast)
- Haynrode (in the central south)
- Holungen (in the north)
- Kehmstedt (east)
- Kaltohmfeld (in the centre)
- Kirchohmfeld (in the centre)
- Kirchworbis (south)
- Kraja (in the east)
- Neustadt (in the northeast)
- Sollstedt (südeast)
- Trebra (nordeast)
- Tastungen (west)
- Teistungen (west)
- Weißenborn-Lüderode (north)
- Wehnde (west)
- Wintzingerode (south)
- Wülfingerode (east)
- Worbis (south-southwest)
