= Bleicherode Hills =

Hill range in Germany

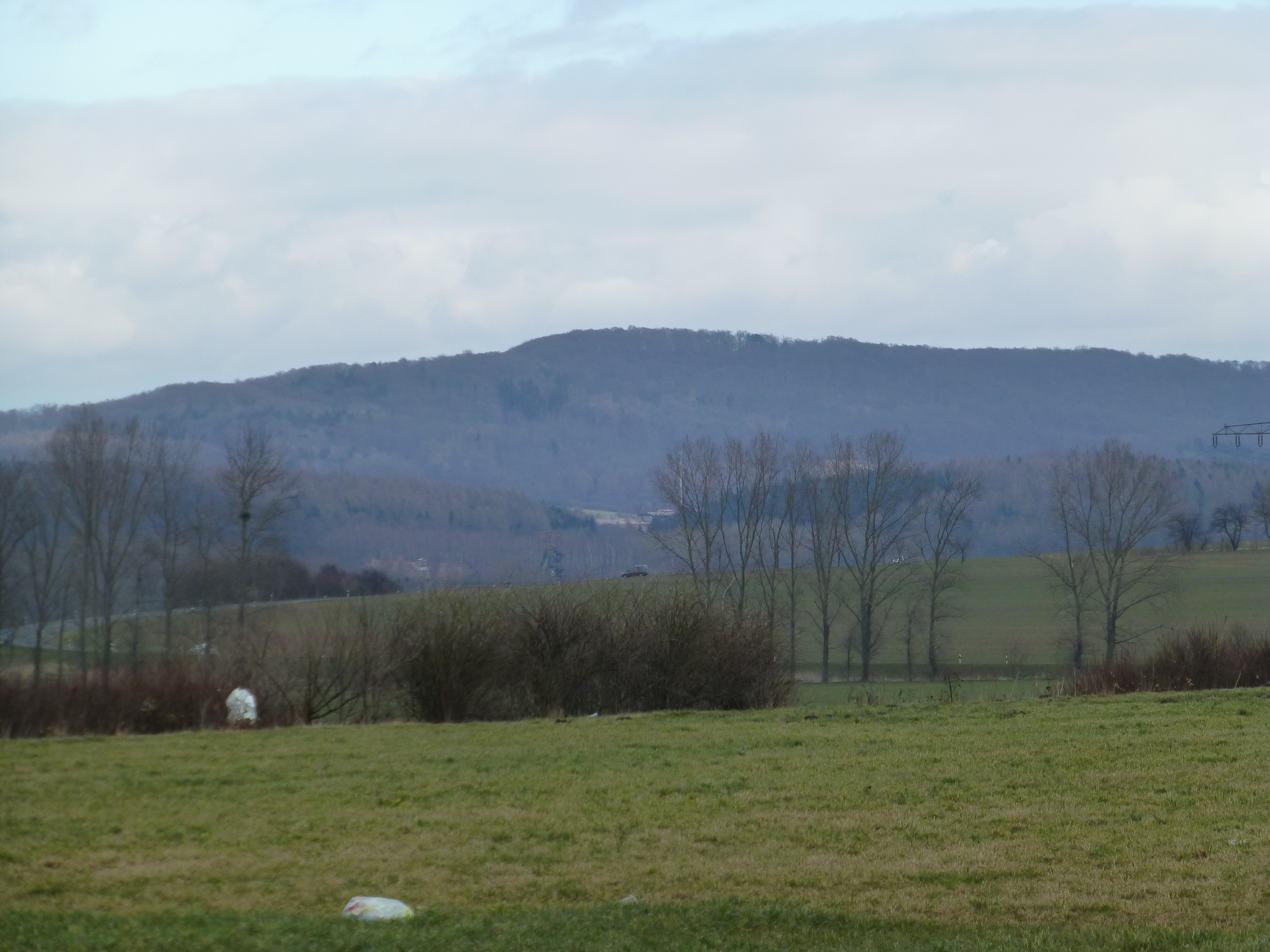
- The Ziegenrück

Highest point
- Peak: Ziegenrück
- Elevation: 460.8 m above NHN

Geography
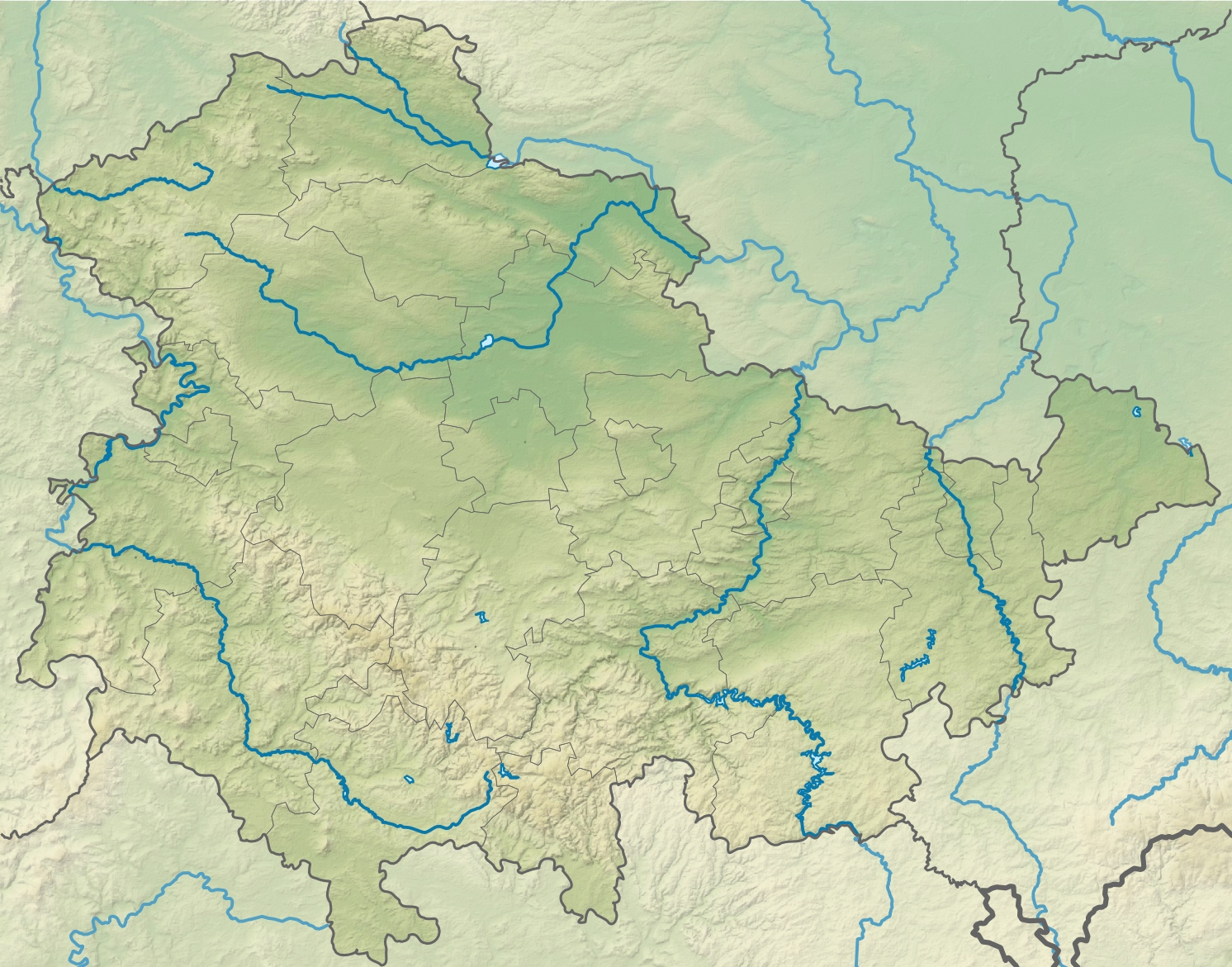
- Location within Thuringia
- Location: Counties of Nordhausen and Eichsfeld; Thuringia (Germany)
- Range coordinates: 51°25′55″N 10°08′45″E
- Parent range: Lower Eichsfeld, in the Weser-Leine Uplands

Geology
- Orogeny: outliers
- Rock type: muschelkalk

The Bleicherode Hills (German: Bleicheröder Berge or Bleicheroder Berge) in the counties of Nordhausen and Eichsfeld in North Thuringia are the east-southeastern foothills of the Ohm Hills in the Lower Eichsfeld. They reach a maximum height of 460.8 m above sea level (NHN) at the summit of the Ziegenrück. Together with the Ohm Hills they cover an area of about 76 km² of which the Bleicherode Hills make up roughly 16 km² of the total landscape area.

== Location ==
The heavily wooded Bleicherode Hills are located between Buhla and Kraja to the north, Bleicherode to the east, Sollstedt to the south, Breitenworbis in the southwest and Haynrode to the northwest. They rise between the Krajaer Bach (a tributary of the River Bode) and the Bode to the north and the Wipper to the south. To the southeast is the Hainleite, to the south the Dün, whilst roughly to the southwest is the der Eichsfeld-Hainich-Werra Valley Nature Park. Their highest hill, the Ziegenrück, is situated about 1 km south-southeast of Buhla.

== Flora, fauna, and funga ==
Beech and, to a lesser extent, pine are the predominant trees growing on the muschelkalk soil of the Bleicherode Hills. Amongst the many rare plant and animal species are 14 native species of orchid. It is also the northernmost location for the juneberry. In addition there is a very interesting group of rare mixed wood species like limes and Scots elms as well as a large a population of yews. Amongst the species of fungi occurring here are: king boletes, bay boletes and St. George's mushrooms. Roe deer and wild boar, red fox, hare, great spotted and green woodpeckers and the rare red kite have also made their home in this protected area.

== Tourism ==
The Bleicherode Hills are a popular destination for locals and visitors to Bleicherode and the surrounding settlements. One particular attraction is the August Petermann nature educational trail. At various stations it gives interesting insights into the natural world.

== Hills ==
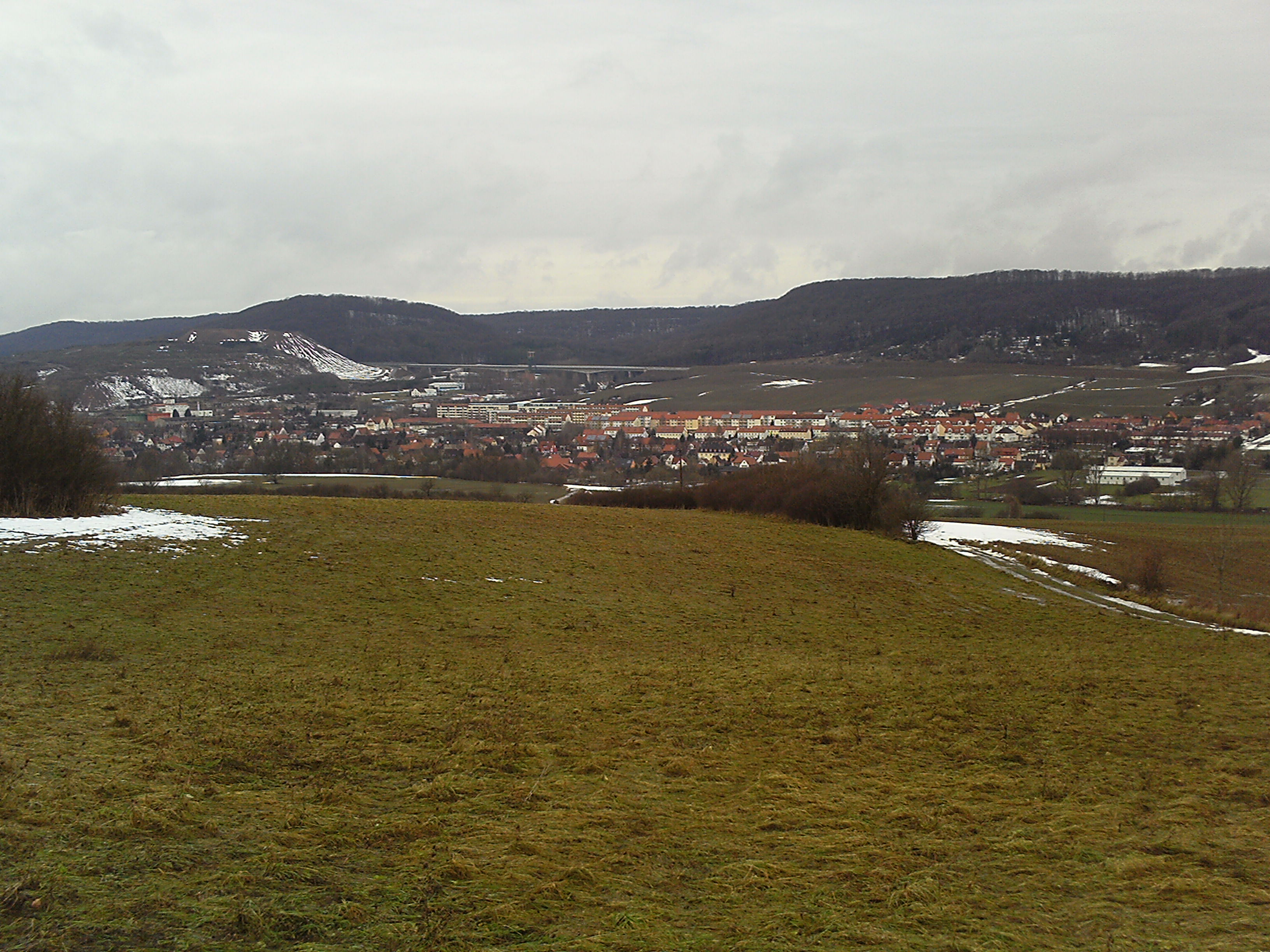
The Bleicherode Hills near Sollstedt with the Egelskopf (left) and Teichkopf (right)

The peaks of the Bleicherode Hills in its narrower sense include the following – with heights in metres above sea level (NHN):

- Ziegenrück (460.8 m), highest point of the Bleicherode Hills; near Buhla
- Krajaer Kopf (459.7 m), south of Kraja
- namenlos (453.1 m), in the centre
- Egelskopf (446.9 m), north of Wülfingerode
- Gebraer Kopf (446.8 m), northwest of Obergebra
- Windolfskopf (433 m), site of the old Löwenburg castle west of Bleicherode
- Teichkopf (430.7 m), north of Sollstedt

The following outliers are also counted as part of the Bleicherode Hills:

- Hasenburg (487,4 m), north of Buhla
- Haarburg (453.1 m), site of the old Harburg castle, southeast of Haynrode
- Hubenberg (453.1 m), southwest of Buhla

== Rivers and streams ==
The rivers and streams of the Bleicherode Hills include the:

- Bode, which rises in the Ohm Hills, heads eastwards, passes the Bleicherode Hills to the northeast and forms a southwestern tributary of the Wipper
- Krajaer Bach, which rises in the Ohm Hills, heads eastwards, passes the Bleicherode Hills to the north and forms a southwestern tributary of the Bode
- Wipper, which rises in the southern part of the Ohm Hills, heads eastwards, passes the Bleicherode Hills to the south and forms a western tributary of the Unstrut

Smaller streams also rise in the Bleicherode Hills, such as the Bleibach near Bleicherode and the Friede (crossed by the A 38's Friede Viaduct) near Sollstedt.

== Settlements ==
The settlements of the Bleicherode Hills include:

- Bleicherode (east)
- Breitenworbis (southwest)
- Buhla (north)
- Haynrode (northwest)
- Kraja (north)
- Sollstedt (south)
