= Gernrode, Thuringia =

Gernrode
- Municipality
- Coat of arms

- Location of Gernrode within Eichsfeld district
- Interactive map of Gernrode
- Location within Germany Location within Thuringia
- Coordinates: 51°23′41″N 10°24′10″E
- Country: Germany
- State: Thuringia
- District: Eichsfeld
- Municipal assoc.: Eichsfeld-Wipperaue

Government
  - Mayor (2022–28): Sebastian Windolph

Area
  - Total: 7.37 km^{2} (2.85 sq mi)
- Elevation: 250–300 m (820–980 ft)

Population (2025-12-31)
  - Total: 1,460
  - Density: 198/km^{2} (513/sq mi)
- Time zone: UTC+01:00 (CET)
  - Summer (DST): UTC+02:00 (CEST)
- Postal codes: 37339
- Dialling codes: 036076
- Vehicle registration: EIC
- Website: www.gernrode-eic.de

Gernrode (German pronunciation: [ɡɛʁnˈʁoːdə]) is a municipality in the district of Eichsfeld in Thuringia, Germany. Its agricultural land is some of the most productive in the district and it therefore does not have any wooded areas.

== Geography ==
Gernrode is located in Upper Eichsfeld in the southern foothills of the Harz. It lies on both sides of the River Wipper, between the Dün and the Ohm Hills, in the centre of the Eichsfelder Kessel (although it is not part of the administrative unit of that name).

== History ==
The ending -rode indicates that the village was founded sometime between the 8th and the 12th centuries. It is first mentioned, as Germenroth, in a document which may date to 1267. At this time it was governed by Haarburg, later by Haarburg-Worbis. During the Middle Ages, the course of the Wipper was changed, making possible the construction of 3 mills in the village. From 1586, Germenrode and Kirchworbis constituted a combined parish. In 1632, during the Thirty Years' War, troops from Weimar burnt down the church and the majority of the houses. The Catholic Church of St. Stephen, built in 1654 (and enlarged in 1932) has a baroque altar and is one of the largest and finest in Eichsfeld. The parish registers go back to 1662. In 1656, the population was reduced by war and plague to 382. The village recovered through migration from surrounding areas.

In 1802, with the rest of the then County of Eichsfeld, Gernrode became part of Prussia and during the Napoleonic Wars was temporarily part of the Kingdom of Westphalia. In the 18th century, the town's economy benefited from flax processing, which was later commemorated in the municipal arms. In 1810, Gernrode had 820 residents.

In 1867, with the construction of the segment of the Halle–Kassel railway between Nordhausen and Arenshausen, Gernrode became the site of one of the 3 stations in Eichsfeld, which, however, was later renamed after Niederorschel because of confusion with Gernrode in the Harz. On 9 December 2007, the station was renamed Gernrode - Niederorschel.

In 1878 a new school was built, followed by a Great Hall. After industrialisation reduced demand for hand weaving and fabric bleaching, the inhabitants found work in plywood production and mechanised weaving near the station, and in cigar factories. Gernrode is today one of the largest settlements in the District of Eichsfeld.

== People born in Gernrode ==
- Heinrich Ernemann (1850-1928), industrialist.
- Rolf Berend (born 1943), politician.
