= Eichsfelder Kessel =

Coordinates: 51.367°N 10.417°E

Eichsfelder Kessel is a former Verwaltungsgemeinschaft ("collective municipality") in the district Eichsfeld, in Thuringia, Germany. The seat of the Verwaltungsgemeinschaft was in Niederorschel. It was disbanded in January 2019.

== Municipalities ==
The Verwaltungsgemeinschaft Eichsfelder Kessel consisted of the following municipalities:

1. Deuna
2. Gerterode
3. Hausen
4. Kleinbartloff
5. Niederorschel
