= Eichbach (Hahle) =

Location
- Country: Germany
- State: Thuringia

Physical characteristics
- Source
  - location: between Steinbach and Hundeshagen
  - coordinates: 51°25′34″N 10°15′17″E
  - elevation: 330 metres (1,080 ft) above Normalhöhennull
- Mouth
  - location: at Teistungen into the Hahle
  - coordinates: 51°28′17″N 10°15′45″E
  - elevation: 196 metres (643 ft) above Normalhöhennull
- Length: about 5.5 kilometres (3.4 mi)

Basin features
- Progression: Hahle→ Rhume→ Leine→ Aller→ Weser→ North Sea
- Tributaries
  - left: Finkgraben, brook from Berlingerode

The Eichbach, also called Eiche, is a river of Thuringia, Germany.

It is a left tributary of the Hahle in the thuringian district Eichsfeld.

== Course ==
The Eichbach springs between Steinbach and Hundeshagen in an area of predominantly agricultural use. It flows in a northerly direction. Shortly before Teistungen it incorporates the Finkgraben and another unnamed brook from Berlingerode. After flowing through Teistungen, at the northern development boundary it flows into the Hahle, a tributary of the Rhume.

== See also ==
- List of rivers of Thuringia
