= Aue (Suhle) =

River in Germany

- Location of mouth in Lower Saxony

Location
- Country: Germany
- State: Lower Saxony

Physical characteristics
- Mouth
  - location: Suhle
  - coordinates: 51.5662°N 10.1931°E
- Length: 13.6 km (8.5 mi)
- Basin size: 32 km^{2} (12 sq mi)

Basin features
- Progression: Suhle→ Hahle→ Rhume→ Leine→ Aller→ Weser→ North Sea

The Aue (German pronunciation: [ˈaʊə]; German: Aue or Aue Bach) is a meandering stream in Lower Saxony, Germany.

The Aue source is near Waake. It enters the Seeburger See near Seeburg and drains it at Bernshausen. A mere creek, it is not navigable. It is a left (west) tributary of the Suhle in Germershausen, part of Rollshausen. The elevation at the mouth is about 157 m asl. There are a number of small neolithic Linear Pottery culture settlements along its banks.

== See also ==
- List of rivers of Lower Saxony
