= Sonnenstein =

Sonnenstein can refer to:

- Sonnenstein, Austria, a mountain in Austria.
- Sonnenstein Castle, a castle in Saxony, Germany.
- Sonnenstein Euthanasia Centre, a Nazi killing facility at Sonnenstein Castle
- Sonnenstein (Ohm Hills), a hill in Thuringia, Germany.
- Sonnenstein, Thuringia, a municipality in Thuringia, Germany.
