= Birkenberg (Ohm Hills) =

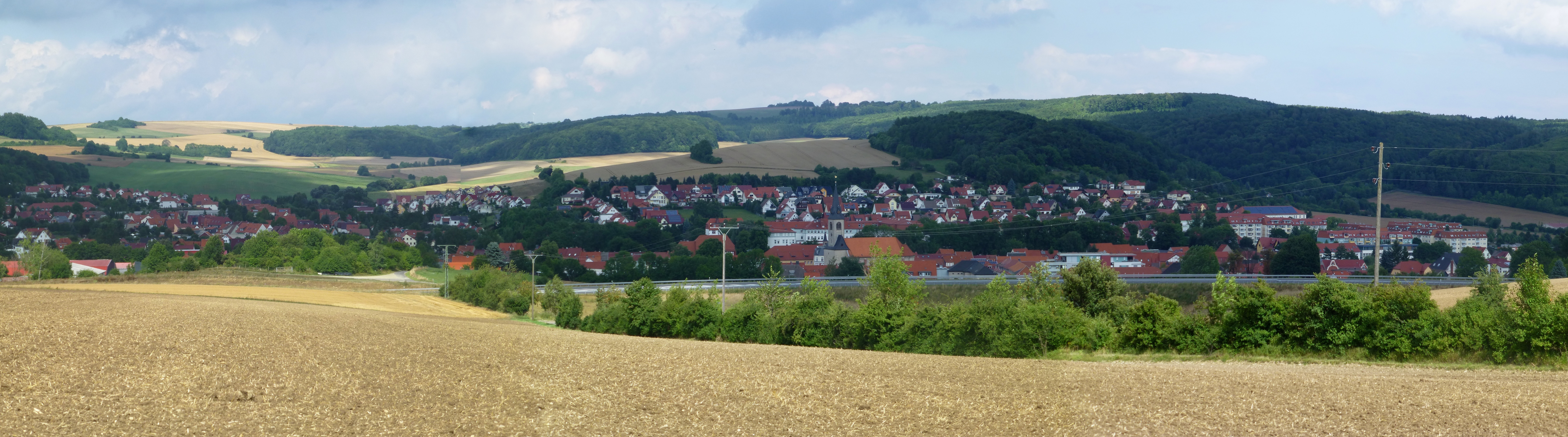
- View from the Klien over Worbis to the Ohm Hills. The transmitter on the Birkenberg may be seen in the background

Highest point
- Elevation: 533.4 m above sea level (HN) (1,750 ft)
- Prominence: 195 m ↓ Bundesstraße 247 in Worbis
- Isolation: 18.8 km → Ratsberg near Bad Sachsa (550 m above NN)
- Coordinates: 51°28′17″N 10°24′30″E

Geography
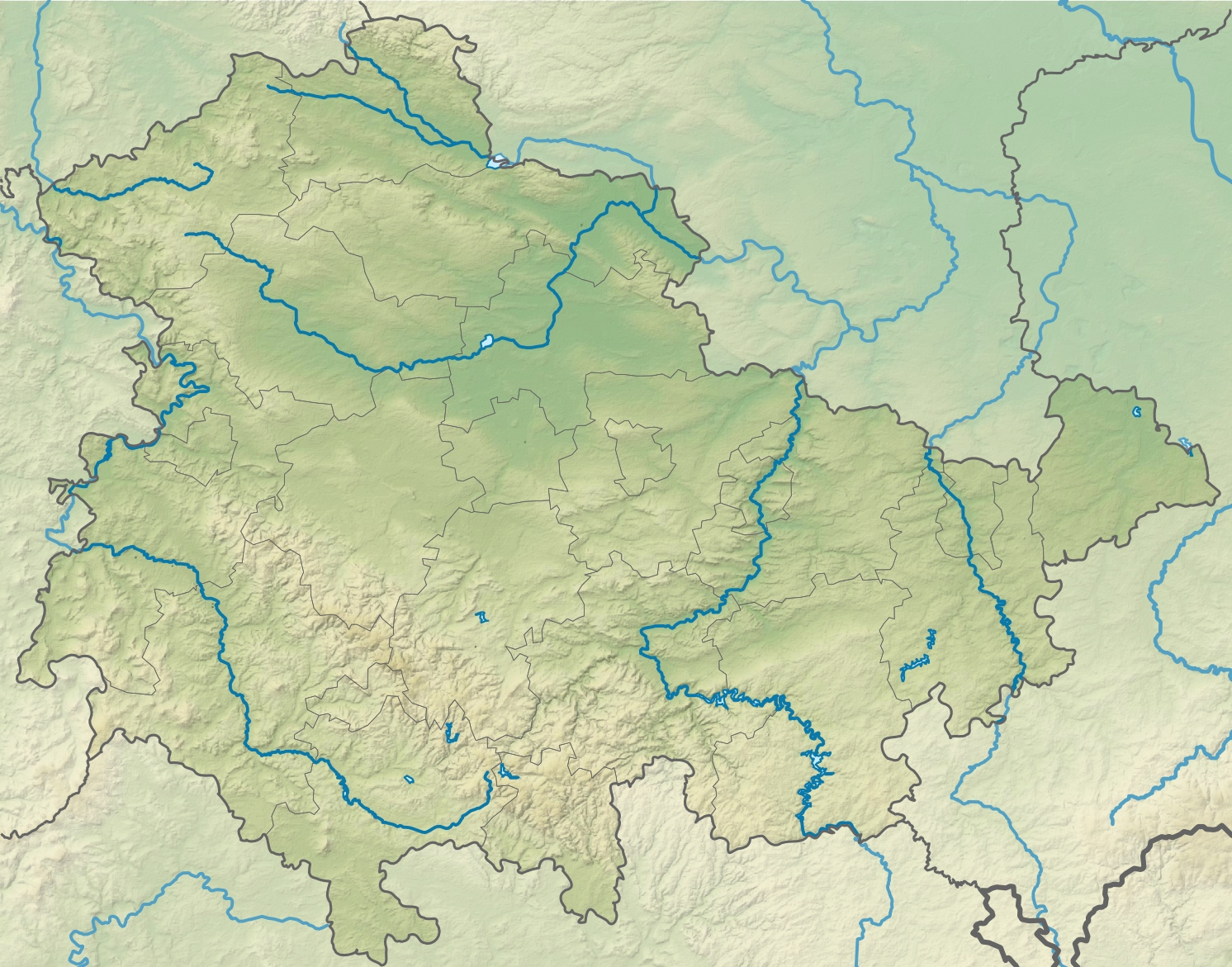
- Location within Thuringia
- Location: Eichsfeld, Thuringia, Germany
- Parent range: Ohm Hills

The Birkenberg, at 533.4 m above sea level (HN), is the highest point in the Ohm Hills. It is located in the county Eichsfeld, northern Thuringia, Germany.

== Location ==
The unforested Birkenberg rises in the centre of the Ohm Hills just under 1 km north of Kaltohmfeld, a north-northeastern village in the municipality of Leinefelde-Worbis. An ascent of the hill can be made via a cul-de-sac that runs from Kaltohmfeld towards the summit. Only the last part of the route has to be undertaken on foot.

== History ==
In East German times, there was a Soviet Army base on the hill which has now fallen into ruins.

== Views ==
From the top of the almost treeless Birkenberg there are good views when the visibility is favourable: to the north may be seen the Harz Mountains and the Brocken. To the east towards Nordhausen the Kyffhäuser hills rise out of the plain. To the south may be seen the Dün and the Thuringian Forest with the Großer Inselsberg. To the west are Die Gleichen, the Dransfeld Municipal Forest and e.g. the Kaufungen Forest on the eastern edge of Kassel in the state of Hesse as well as the summit of the Hoher Meißner.
