= Kraja =

Kraja may refer to:

- Skadarska Krajina an geographical region in southeastern Montenegro
- Kraja, Germany, a municipality in Thuringia, Germany
- Kraja, a folk music group from Umeå, Sweden.
