= Hans-Joachim Heyer =

German Luftwaffe pilot (1922–1942)

- Born: 20 April 1922; Rehungen, Germany
- Died: 9 November 1942 (aged 20); Leningrad, Soviet Union
- Cause of death: Killed in action
- Military career
- Allegiance: Nazi Germany
- Branch: Luftwaffe
- Service years: 1939–1942
- Rank: Leutnant (second lieutenant)
- Unit: JG 54
- Conflicts: World War II: Operation Barbarossa; Siege of Leningrad
- Awards: Knight's Cross of the Iron Cross

Hans-Joachim Heyer (20 April 1922 – 9 November 1942) was a Luftwaffe ace and recipient of the Knight's Cross of the Iron Cross during World War II. The Knight's Cross of the Iron Cross, and its variants were the highest awards in the military and paramilitary forces of Nazi Germany during World War II. Heyer was killed in action in a mid-air collision near Leningrad, Russian SFSR, Soviet Union on 9 November 1942. Posthumously, he was awarded the Knight's Cross on 25 November 1942. During his career he was credited with 53 aerial victories, all of them on the Eastern Front.

== Career ==
On 14 September 1942, Heyer was credited with JG 54s 3,000th aerial victory.

On 8 November 1942, III. Gruppe moved to Siverskaya, located approximately 60 kilometers (37 miles) south of Leningrad. The next day, Heyer was killed in action in a mid-air collision during aerial combat with a Curtiss P-40 Warhawk fighter. His Messerschmitt Bf 109 G-2 (Werknummer 13809—factory number) crashed at 08:30 near Gorodok. Posthumously, Heyer was awarded the Knight's Cross of the Iron Cross (Ritterkreuz des Eisernen Kreuzes) on 25 November 1942 for his 53 aerial victories claimed.

== Summary of career ==
=== Aerial victory claims ===
According to US historian David T. Zabecki, Heyer was credited with 53 aerial victories. Mathews and Foreman, authors of Luftwaffe Aces — Biographies and Victory Claims, researched the German Federal Archives and found documentation for 53 aerial victories, all of which claimed on the Eastern Front.

=== Awards ===
- Flugzeugführerabzeichen
- Front Flying Clasp of the Luftwaffe in Gold
- Iron Cross (1939)
  - 2nd Class (7 July 1941)
  - 1st Class (30 November 1941)
- Wound Badge (1939)
  - in Black (10 September 1942)
- Honor Goblet of the Luftwaffe on 20 July 1942 as Leutnant and pilot
- German Cross in Gold on 4 August 1942 as Leutnant in the III./Jagdgeschwader 54
- Knight's Cross of the Iron Cross on 25 November 1942 as Leutnant and Flugzeugführer (pilot) in the III./Jagdgeschwader 54
