= Rüdigershagen =

Coordinates: 51°20′50″N 10°26′37″E

Rüdigershagen is a village in the municipality of Niederorschel in Eichsfeld, Thuringia, Germany. Rüdigershagen is located one the north slope of the Dün hills, and has approximately 600 inhabitants (31 December 1995: 618).

== History ==
- First documented: 1273
- Manor, built: 1590, partly demolished in 1984
- First school founded in 1607, new building in 1682
- Church, rebuilt in 1686
