= Suhle =

Suhle may refer to:

- Suhle (Hahle), a river of Lower Saxony, Germany, tributary of the Hahle
- Berthold Suhle (1837–1904), German chess master
