= Amtsgericht Nordhausen =

Coordinates: 51°30′0″N 10°47′56″E

Amtsgericht Nordhausen is the District Court of Nordhausen and one of 23 district courts in Thuringia, Germany. Established in 1879, it has approximately 60 employees, including judges. The jurisdiction of the district court of Nordhausen includes the core city of Nordhausen, Ellrich and Bleicherode, the management communities of Goldene Aue and Hohnstein/Südharz, the unified communities of Werther and Hohenstein, and the community of Sollstedt.
