= Vollenborn =

- Ortsteil of Deuna
- Coat of arms
- Interactive map of Vollenborn
- Location within Germany Location within Thuringia
- Coordinates: 51°21′44″N 10°30′40″E
- Country: Germany
- State: Thuringia
- District: Eichsfeld
- Municipality: Deuna

Area
  - Total: 2.41 km^{2} (0.93 sq mi)
- Elevation: 385 m (1,263 ft)

Population (2012-12-31)
  - Total: 231
  - Density: 95.9/km^{2} (248/sq mi)
- Time zone: UTC+01:00 (CET)
  - Summer (DST): UTC+02:00 (CEST)
- Postal codes: 37355
- Dialling codes: 036076
- Vehicle registration: EIC
- Website: niederorschel.de

Vollenborn (German pronunciation: [ˈfɔlənˌbɔʁn]) is a village and a former municipality in the district of Eichsfeld in Thuringia, Germany. Since 31 December 2013, it is part of the municipality Deuna.
