= Bischofferode =

- Ortsteil of Am Ohmberg
- Coat of arms
- Interactive map of Bischofferode
- Location within Germany Location within Thuringia
- Coordinates: 51°29′48″N 10°26′35″E
- Country: Germany
- State: Thuringia
- District: Eichsfeld
- Municipality: Am Ohmberg

Area
  - Total: 12.21 km^{2} (4.71 sq mi)
- Elevation: 295 m (968 ft)

Population (2011)
  - Total: 1,230
  - Density: 101/km^{2} (261/sq mi)
- Time zone: UTC+01:00 (CET)
  - Summer (DST): UTC+02:00 (CEST)
- Postal codes: 37345
- Dialling codes: 036077
- Website: www.bischofferode.de

Bischofferode (German pronunciation: [bɪʃɔfəˈʁoːdə]) is a village and a former municipality in the Eichsfeld district, in Thuringia, Germany. Since 1 December 2010, it is part of the municipality Am Ohmberg. Bischofferode consists of the subdivisions of Bischofferode, Hauröden and Siedlung "Thomas Müntzer".

== Bischofferode and Holungen ==
The historical border of the area "Eichsfeld" goes straight through the drainage area of the two schools - Bischofferode and Holungen are dominated by the Catholic belief, that shows the traditional membership to the Eichsfeld. Hauröden is dominated by the Protestant belief, what shows, that the village was historically stronger linked to the Protestant area of Nordhausen and Sondershausen. (Hauröden has been a part of the district of Nordhausen until 1952).

It was first mentioned in 1186 as a convent village of the monastery in Gerode.

Little hamlets in the boundary: - Wenigenbischofferode - Husen - Poppenrode

The arms are The unprooting hoe and the crosier show the origin as an unprooting village and the bishop's property.

=== Economy ===
The people mainly earned their money in the agricultural production until the beginning of the 20th century. Then in 1909 the salt mine opened. It was the most important branch until 31 December 1993. This date was the end of the salt production in Bischofferode. Today the trade plays a more important role.

== Village of Hauröden ==
The village Hauröden - hauröden has been a part of Bischofferode since 1974. The first mention is: 1206 Howeritte 1370 Houenreden. The village was nearly depopulated as a result of the Thirty Years' War.

Little hamlets in the boundary: Bennrode, Sipterode, Billrode.

=== Economy ===
Agricultural production and weaving were the first sources of income followed by the salt-mining. Working in the salt-mine meant better wages for the people. In 1897 a railway line was built, the housing estate "Neubleicherode" was founded and electricity introduced in 1917. A housing estate for the workers was built in Hauröden itself in 1919.

=== Sights/ tourist attractions ===
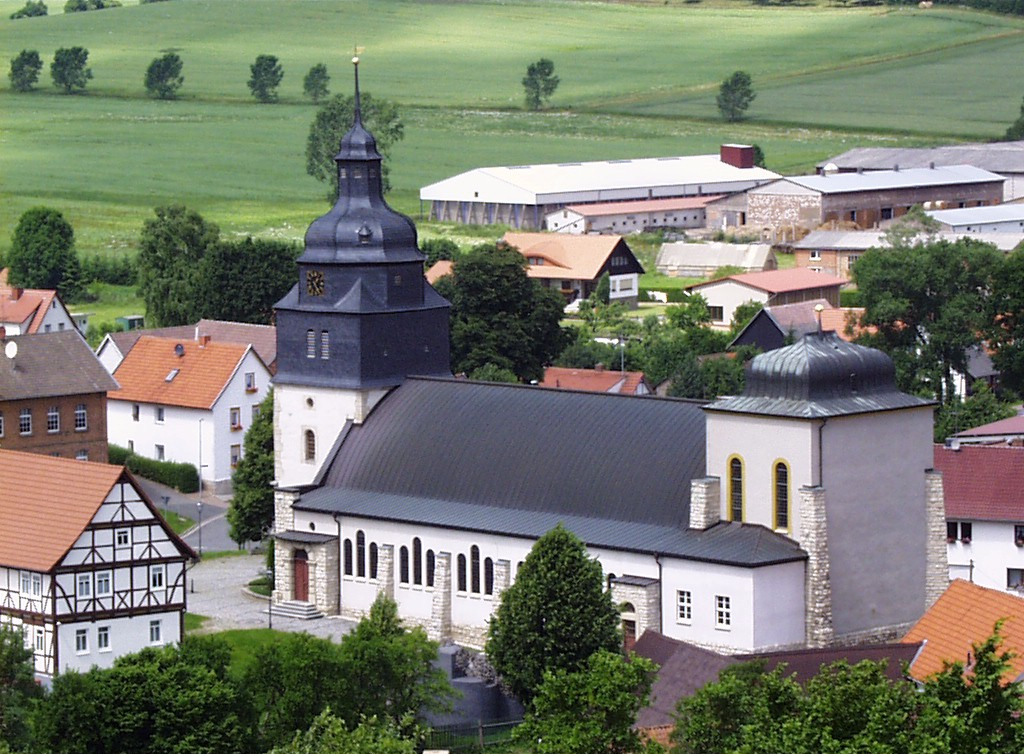
Church Maria Geburt (2003)

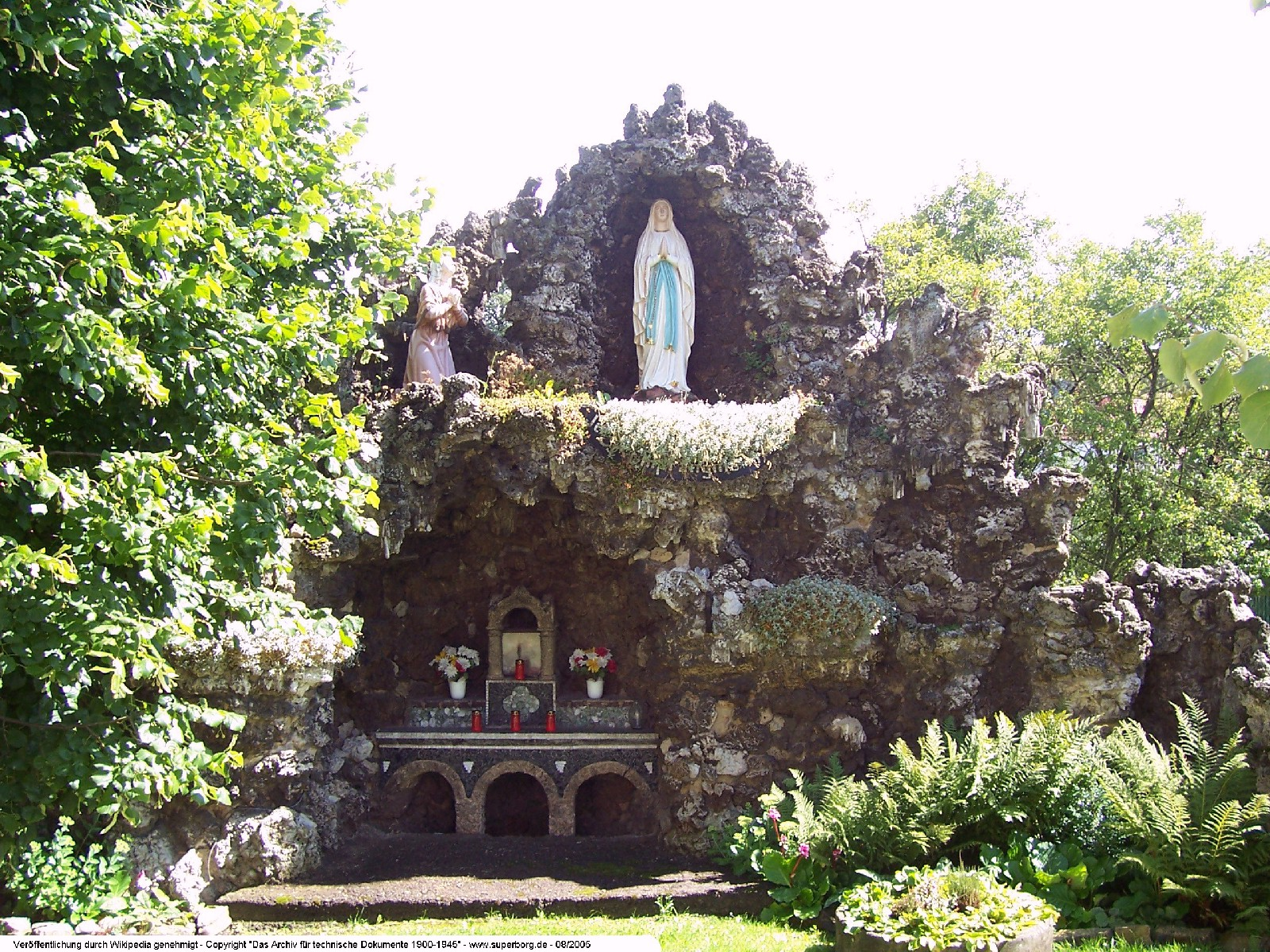
Natursteingrotte (2005)

Church (Trinitatiskirche) built in 1617 in rustic baroque style - war memorial (1927) - very old lime tree (under protection) - "Hauröder Klippen" - a lookout in the hills of the Ohm Hills - restaurant "Hauröder Klippen" (in 1997 renovated, with rooms to let)

Church (Marienkirche) with a baroque tower and a modern interior decorating (projected by Prof. Tresst) - museum of the "potash union" - a lot of public footpaths

=== Population development ===
Year	Population
1933	1139
1939	1181
1946	1405
1950	1664
1956	1685
1961	1711

Year	Population
1964	1910
1971	2600
1980	2810
1983	2779
1985	2830
1990	2770

Year	Population
1992	2665
1993	2671
1994	2693
1995	2626
1996	2573
1997	2495

Year	Population
1998	2312
1999	2263
2000	2168
2001	2206
2002	2182
2003	2133

Year	Population
2004	2110
2005	2063
2006	1991
2007	1953
2008	1917
2009	

Reference (from 1994): Thüringer Landesamt für Statistik
