= Lindenberg/Eichsfeld =

Municipal association in Thuringia, Germany

- Verwaltungsgemeinschaft
- Map of Eichsfeld highlighting Lindenberg/Eichsfeld
- Interactive map of Lindenberg/Eichsfeld
- Location within Germany Location within Thuringia
- Coordinates: 51°28′N 10°16′E
- Country: Germany
- State: Thuringia
- District: Eichsfeld
- Seat: Teistungen
- Subdivisions: 7 municipalities

Area
  - Total: 68.94 km^{2} (26.62 sq mi)

Population (2025-12-31)
  - Total: 6,547
  - Density: 94.97/km^{2} (246.0/sq mi)
- Time zone: UTC+01:00 (CET)
  - Summer (DST): UTC+02:00 (CEST)
- Website: www.lindenberg-eichsfeld.de

Lindenberg/Eichsfeld is a Verwaltungsgemeinschaft ("collective municipality") in the district Eichsfeld, in Thuringia, Germany. The seat of the Verwaltungsgemeinschaft is in Teistungen.

The Verwaltungsgemeinschaft Lindenberg/Eichsfeld consists of the following municipalities:

1. Berlingerode
2. Brehme
3. Ecklingerode
4. Ferna
5. Tastungen
6. Teistungen
7. Wehnde
