= Am Ohmberg =

- Municipality
- Location of Am Ohmberg within Eichsfeld district
- Interactive map of Am Ohmberg
- Location within Germany Location within Thuringia
- Coordinates: 51°29′N 10°28′E
- Country: Germany
- State: Thuringia
- District: Eichsfeld

Government
  - Mayor (2023–29): Karl-Josef Wand

Area
  - Total: 31.57 km^{2} (12.19 sq mi)
- Elevation: 290 m (950 ft)

Population (2025-12-31)
  - Total: 3,577
  - Density: 113.3/km^{2} (293.5/sq mi)
- Time zone: UTC+01:00 (CET)
  - Summer (DST): UTC+02:00 (CEST)
- Postal codes: 37345
- Dialling codes: 036077
- Vehicle registration: EIC

Am Ohmberg (German pronunciation: [am ˈʔoːmbɛʁk], lit. 'on the Ohmberg') is a municipality in the district of Eichsfeld, in Thuringia, Germany. It was formed by the merger of the previously independent municipalities Bischofferode, Großbodungen and Neustadt, on 1 December 2010.

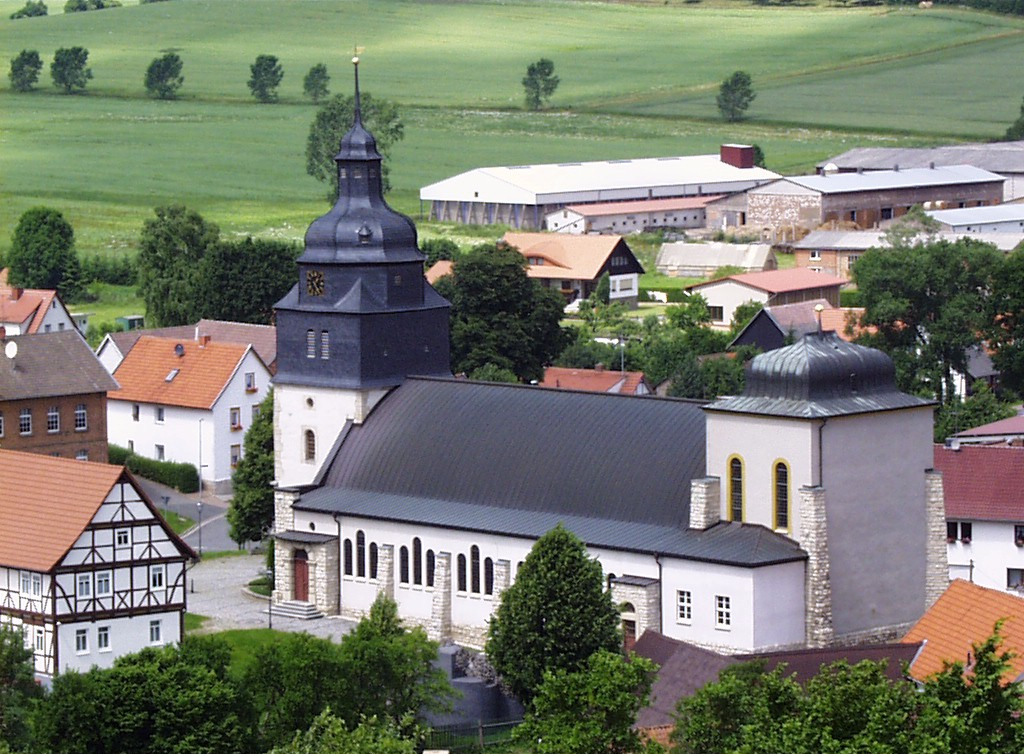
Church Maria Geburt (2003)

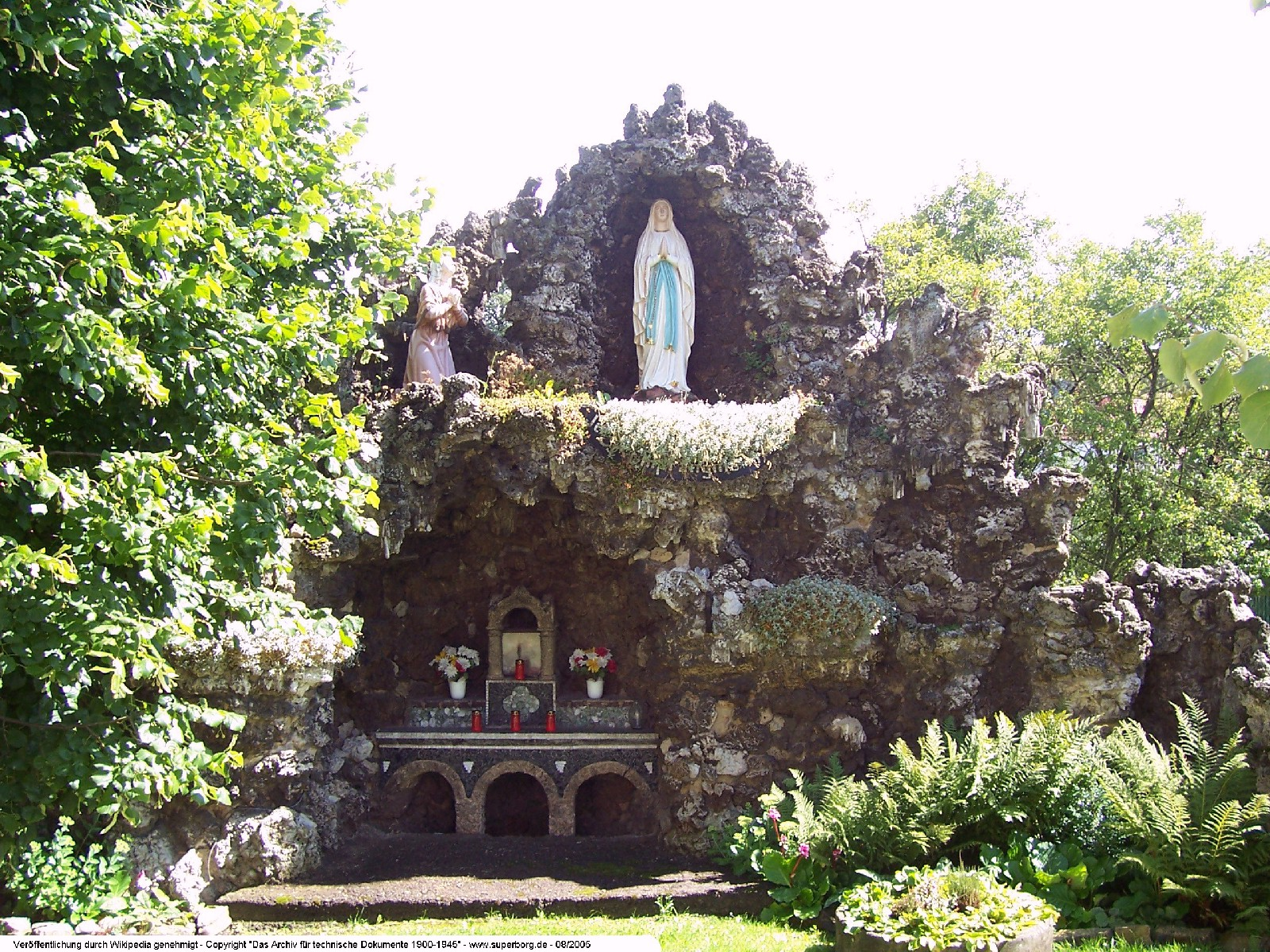
Natursteingrotte (2005)
