= Bode (Wipper) =

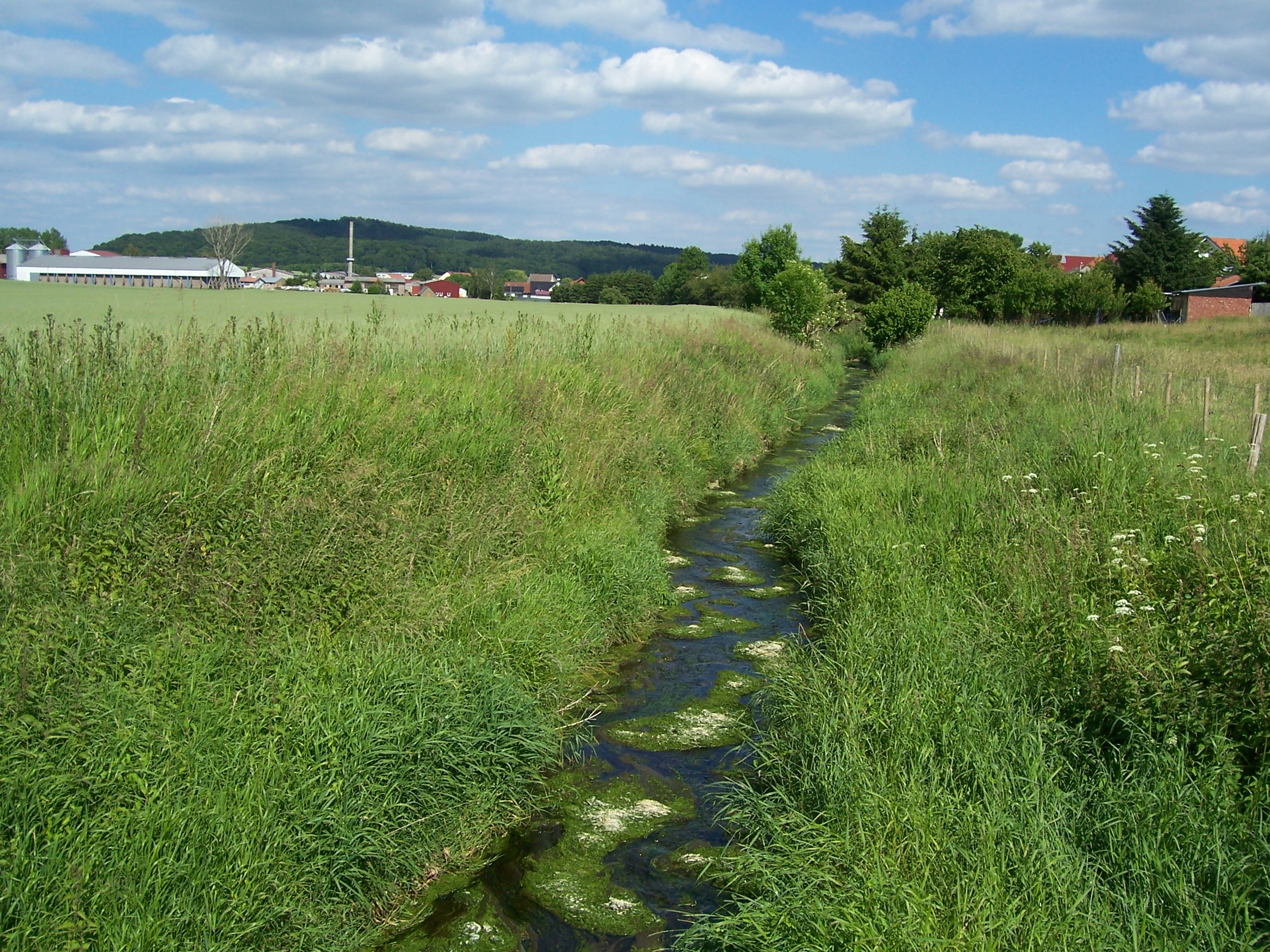
- Bode at Bischofsrode

- Bode river and the upper part of Wipper river

Location
- Country: Germany
- State: Thuringia

Physical characteristics
- Mouth
  - location: Wipper
  - coordinates: 51.4518°N 10.6115°E

Basin features
- Progression: Wipper→ Unstrut→ Saale→ Elbe→ North Sea

The Bode (German pronunciation: [ˈboːdə]) is a small 20 km (12 mi) long river in Thuringia, Germany.

The Bode is a left tributary of the Wipper. Its source is near the village of Holungen in a small upland range called the Ohm Hills. From there the Bode flows in a southeastern direction until it joins the Wipper at Bleicherode. Its drainage area is 104 km^{2} (40 sq mi) and the average discharge is around 0.8 m^{3}/s (28 cu ft/s).

== See also ==
- List of rivers of Thuringia
