= Kleinbodungen =

- Ortsteil of Bleicherode
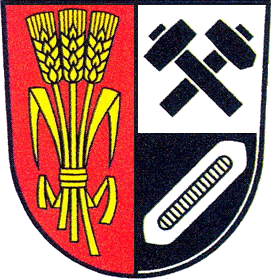
- Coat of arms
- Interactive map of Kleinbodungen
- Location within Germany Location within Thuringia
- Coordinates: 51°28′N 10°31′E
- Country: Germany
- State: Thuringia
- District: Nordhausen
- Town: Bleicherode

Area
  - Total: 5.25 km^{2} (2.03 sq mi)
- Elevation: 248 m (814 ft)

Population (2017-12-31)
  - Total: 353
  - Density: 67.2/km^{2} (174/sq mi)
- Time zone: UTC+01:00 (CET)
  - Summer (DST): UTC+02:00 (CEST)
- Postal codes: 99752
- Dialling codes: 036338

Kleinbodungen (German pronunciation: [ˈklaɪnˌboːdʊŋən], lit. 'Little Bodungen', in contrast to "Big Bodungen") is a village and a former municipality in the district of Nordhausen, in Thuringia, Germany. Since 1 January 2019, it is part of the town Bleicherode.
