= Teistungen =

- Municipality
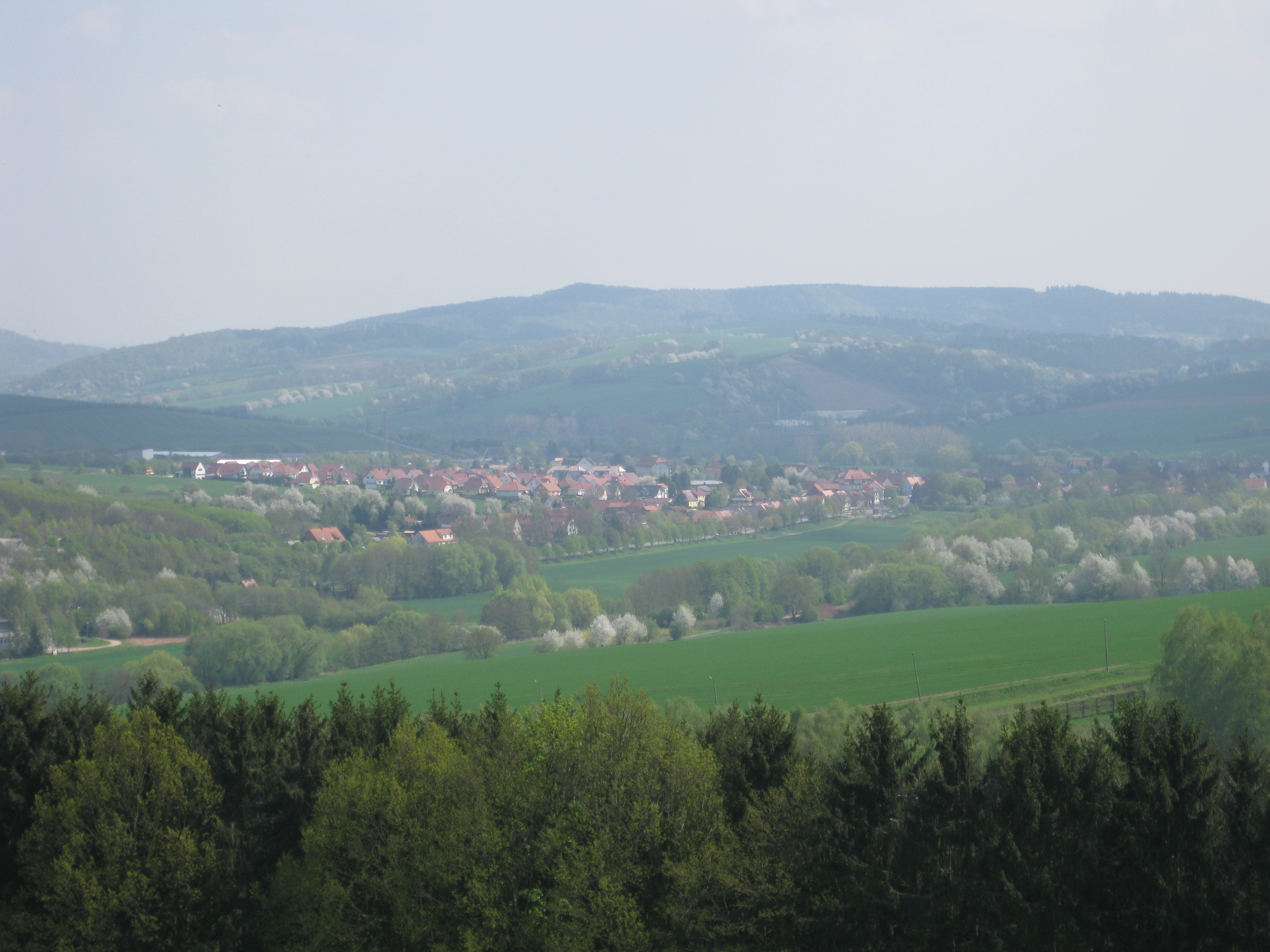
- General view

- Coat of arms

- Location of Teistungen within Eichsfeld district
- Interactive map of Teistungen
- Location within Germany Location within Thuringia
- Coordinates: 51°28′11″N 10°15′57″E
- Country: Germany
- State: Thuringia
- District: Eichsfeld
- Municipal assoc.: Lindenberg/Eichsfeld
- Subdivisions: 3 Ortsteile

Government
  - Mayor (2019–25): Christoph Krukenberg

Area
  - Total: 25.94 km^{2} (10.02 sq mi)
- Elevation: 200 m (660 ft)

Population (2025-12-31)
  - Total: 2,457
  - Density: 94.72/km^{2} (245.3/sq mi)
- Time zone: UTC+01:00 (CET)
  - Summer (DST): UTC+02:00 (CEST)
- Postal codes: 37339
- Dialling codes: 036071
- Vehicle registration: EIC
- Website: www.teistungen.de

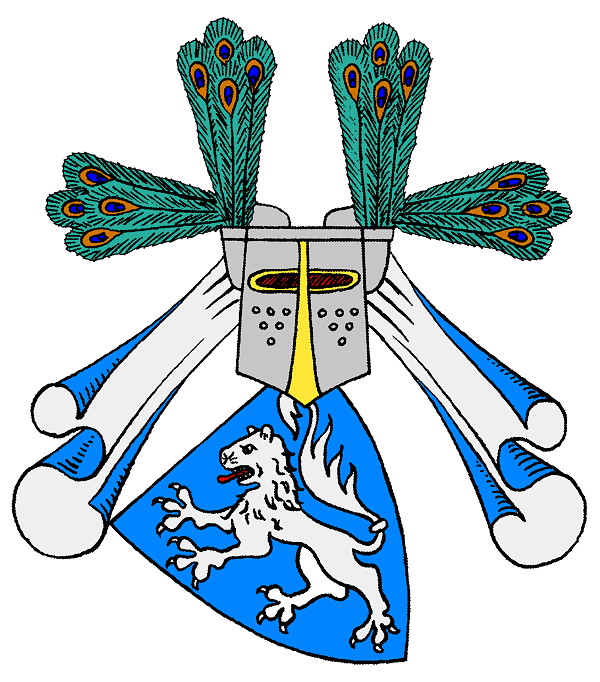
Coat of arms of the von Westernhagen family

Teistungen is a municipality in the district of Eichsfeld in Thuringia, Germany.

Teistungen was first mentioned in 1090 as the site of Teistungenburg monastery, a filiation of Beuren monastery. The old monastery buildings were demolished in 1975.

It is located in the historical Eichsfeld, formerly a remote exclave of the Electorate of Mainz in Central Germany. In 1283 the fief was acquired by the knightly family von Hagen who resided in nearby Westernhagen Castle at Berlingerode (destroyed in 1525). The Westernhagen family built two tower houses here that were later replaced by manor houses. Between 1802 and 1807 the Eichsfeld became part of the Kingdom of Westphalia, then until 1945 of the Prussian Province of Saxony, thereafter it formed part of East Germany. Since 1990 it is part of the state of Thuringia.

== Museums ==
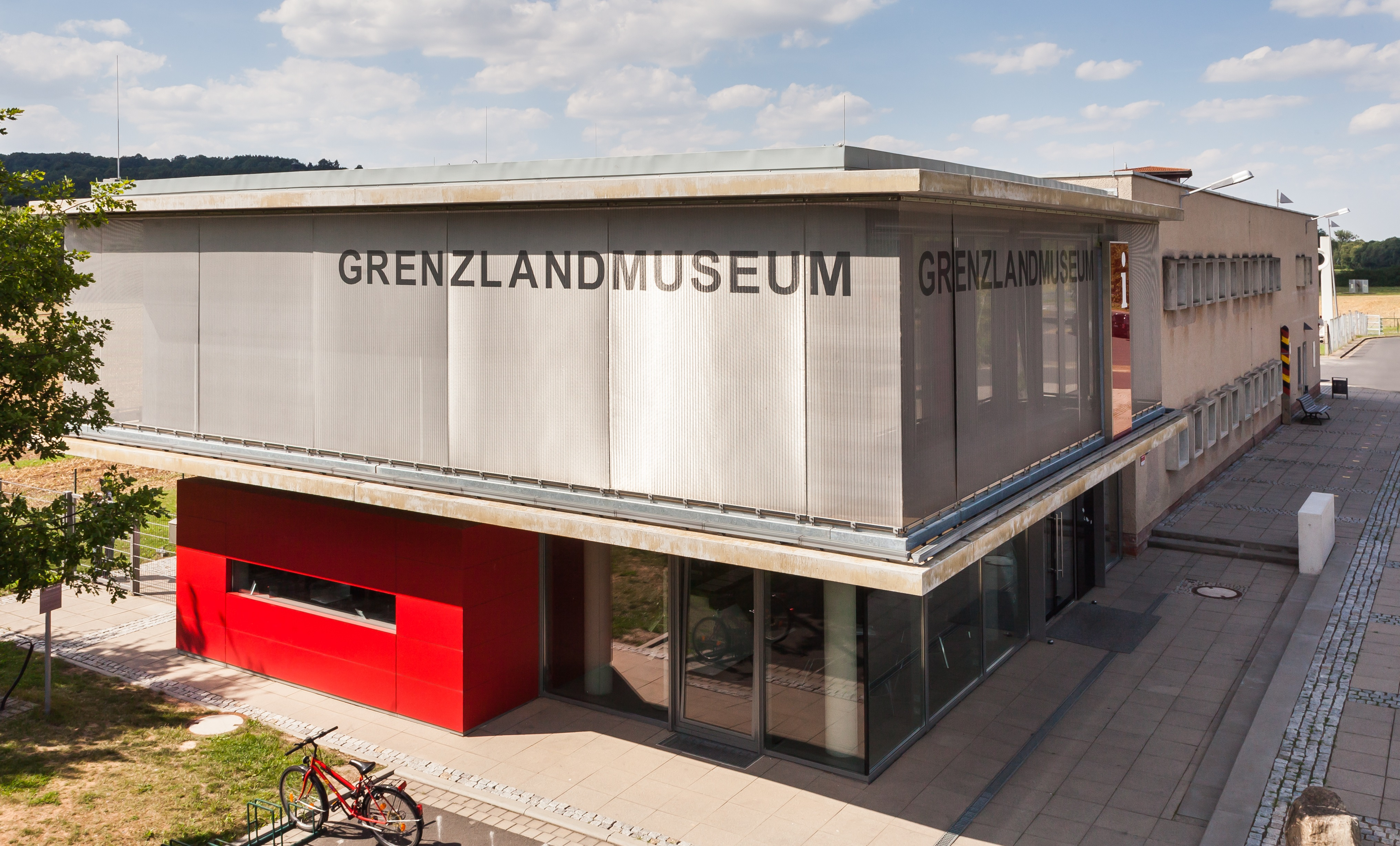
The Borderland Museum Eichsfeld in Teistungen, Thuringia, addresses various aspects of the history of the GDR.

Teistungen is the location of the Borderland Museum Eichsfeld, a history museum dealing with the inner-German border and the German division. The indoor exhibition covers more than 1,000 squaremetres and is complemented by an outdoor area including a circular trail along the former Iron Curtain. As the museum exhibition is displayed not only in German, but also in English, it attracts tens of thousands visitors from all over the world every year.
