= Ecklingerode =

- Municipality
- Coat of arms

- Location of Ecklingerode within Eichsfeld district
- Interactive map of Ecklingerode
- Location within Germany Location within Thuringia
- Coordinates: 51°30′12″N 10°18′42″E
- Country: Germany
- State: Thuringia
- District: Eichsfeld
- Municipal assoc.: Lindenberg/Eichsfeld
- Subdivisions: 2

Government
  - Mayor (2022–28): René Sieber

Area
  - Total: 8.10 km^{2} (3.13 sq mi)
- Elevation: 200 m (660 ft)

Population (2025-12-31)
  - Total: 696
  - Density: 85.9/km^{2} (223/sq mi)
- Time zone: UTC+01:00 (CET)
  - Summer (DST): UTC+02:00 (CEST)
- Postal codes: 37339
- Dialling codes: 036071
- Vehicle registration: EIC
- Website: www.ecklingerode.de

Ecklingerode is a municipality in the district of Eichsfeld in Thuringia, Germany.
