= Rehungen =

- Village of Sollstedt
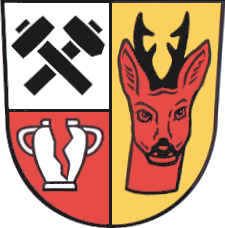
- Coat of arms
- Interactive map of Rehungen
- Location within Germany Location within Thuringia
- Coordinates: 51°22′55″N 10°31′21″E
- Country: Germany
- State: Thuringia
- District: Nordhausen
- Town: Sollstedt

Area
  - Total: 8.66 km^{2} (3.34 sq mi)
- Elevation: 345 m (1,132 ft)

Population (2006-12-31)
  - Total: 493
  - Density: 56.9/km^{2} (147/sq mi)
- Time zone: UTC+01:00 (CET)
  - Summer (DST): UTC+02:00 (CEST)
- Postal codes: 99759
- Dialling codes: 036338

Rehungen is a former municipality in the district of Nordhausen, in Thuringia, Germany. Since 1 January 2009, it is part of Sollstedt.
