= Sonnenstein (Ohm Hills) =

Coordinates: 51°29′50″N 10°23′06″E

The Sonnenstein (German pronunciation: [ˈzɔnənʃtaɪn]) is a hill in the Eichsfeld, Thuringia, Germany. It forms part of the Ohm Hills. Its elevation is 486 metres (1,594 ft) above sea level.

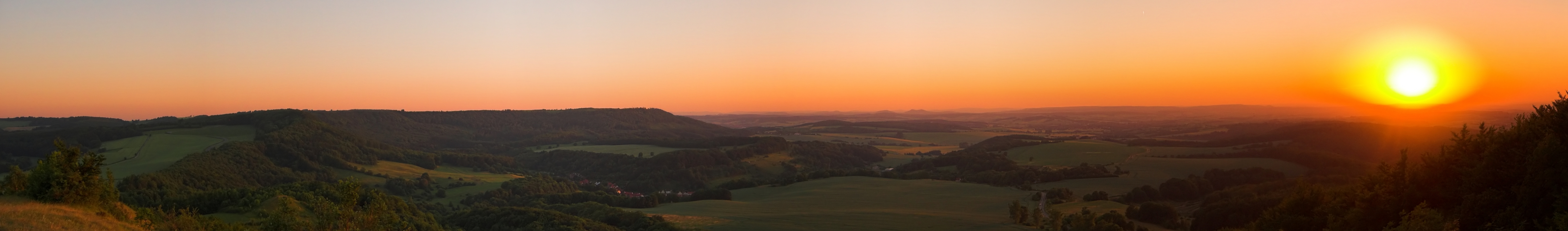
Southbound view from Sonnenstein. Left: the western part of the Ohm Hills.

- Information and pictures
