= Hausen, Thuringia =

Hausen
- Ortsteil of Niederorschel
- Coat of arms
- Interactive map of Hausen
- Location within Germany Location within Thuringia
- Coordinates: 51°22′47″N 10°22′43″E
- Country: Germany
- State: Thuringia
- District: Eichsfeld
- Municipality: Niederorschel

Area
  - Total: 4.3 km^{2} (1.7 sq mi)
- Elevation: 320 m (1,050 ft)

Population (2017-12-31)
  - Total: 416
  - Density: 97/km^{2} (250/sq mi)
- Time zone: UTC+01:00 (CET)
  - Summer (DST): UTC+02:00 (CEST)
- Postal codes: 37327
- Dialling codes: 03605
- Vehicle registration: EIC

Hausen (German pronunciation: [ˈhaʊzn̩]) is a village and a former municipality in the district of Eichsfeld in Thuringia, Germany. Since 1 January 2019, it is part of the municipality Niederorschel.
