= Gerterode =

- Ortsteil of Niederorschel
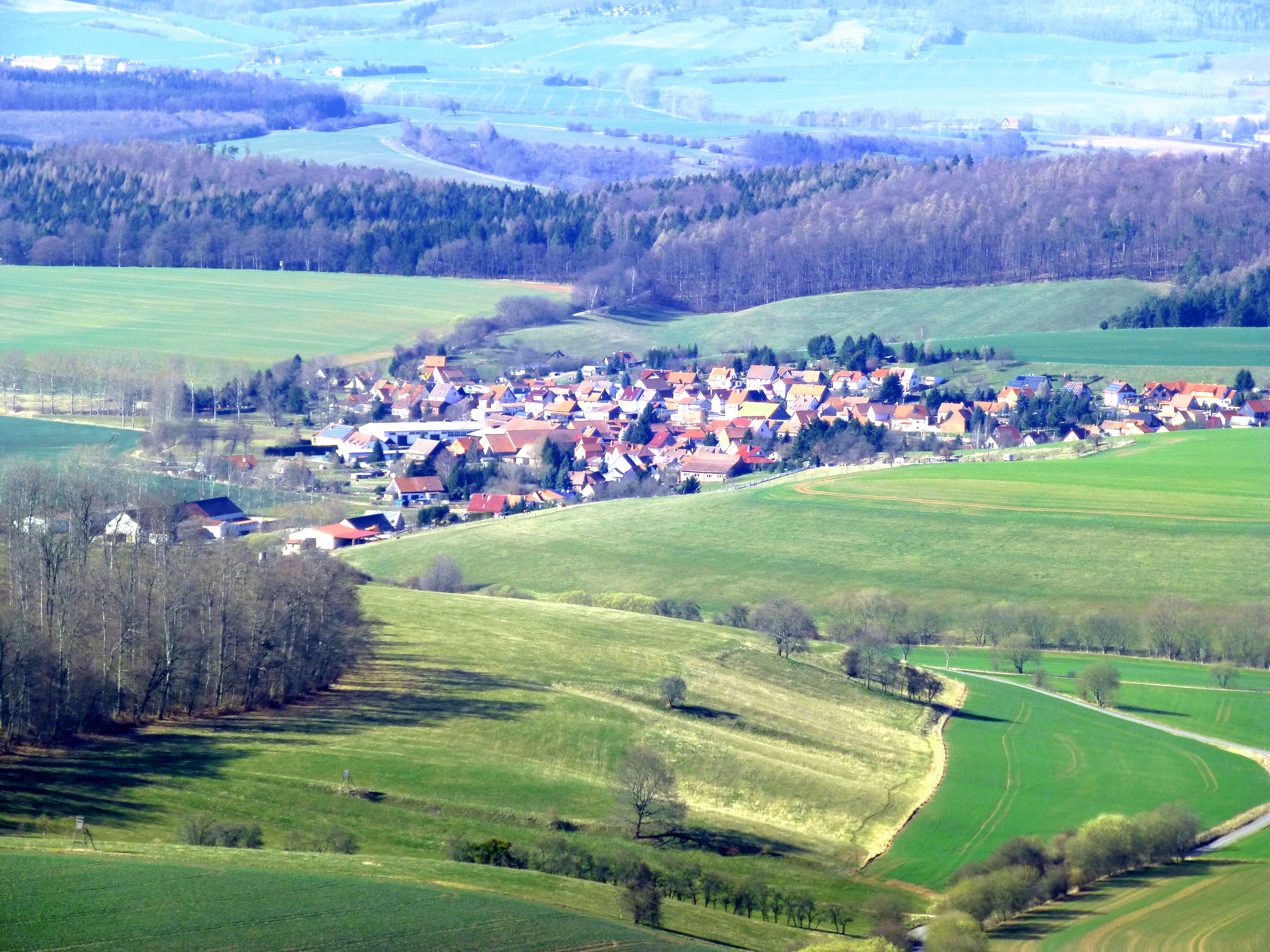

- Coat of arms
- Interactive map of Gerterode
- Location within Germany Location within Thuringia
- Coordinates: 51°22′50″N 10°29′24″E
- Country: Germany
- State: Thuringia
- District: Eichsfeld
- Municipality: Niederorschel

Area
  - Total: 6.3 km^{2} (2.4 sq mi)
- Elevation: 295 m (968 ft)

Population (2018-12-31)
  - Total: 355
  - Density: 56/km^{2} (150/sq mi)
- Time zone: UTC+01:00 (CET)
  - Summer (DST): UTC+02:00 (CEST)
- Postal codes: 37355
- Dialling codes: 036076
- Vehicle registration: EIC
- Website: www.gerterode.de

Gerterode (German pronunciation: [ɡɛʁtəˈʁoːdə]) is a village and a former municipality in the district of Eichsfeld in Thuringia, Germany. Since 1 January 2019, it is part of the municipality Niederorschel.
