= Großbodungen =

- Ortsteil of Am Ohmberg
- Interactive map of Großbodungen
- Location within Germany Location within Thuringia
- Coordinates: 51°28′N 10°30′E
- Country: Germany
- State: Thuringia
- District: Eichsfeld
- Municipality: Am Ohmberg

Area
  - Total: 15.54 km^{2} (6.00 sq mi)
- Elevation: 270 m (890 ft)

Population (2009-12-31)
  - Total: 1,402
  - Density: 90.22/km^{2} (233.7/sq mi)
- Time zone: UTC+01:00 (CET)
  - Summer (DST): UTC+02:00 (CEST)
- Postal codes: 37345
- Dialling codes: 036077
- Website: www.vg-eichsfeld-suedharz.de

Großbodungen (German pronunciation: [ˈɡʁoːsˌboːdʊŋən], lit. 'Big Bodungen', in contrast to "Little Bodungen") is a village and a former municipality in the Eichsfeld district, in Thuringia, Germany. Since 1 December 2010, it is part of the municipality Am Ohmberg.
