= Suhle (Hahle) =

River in Germany

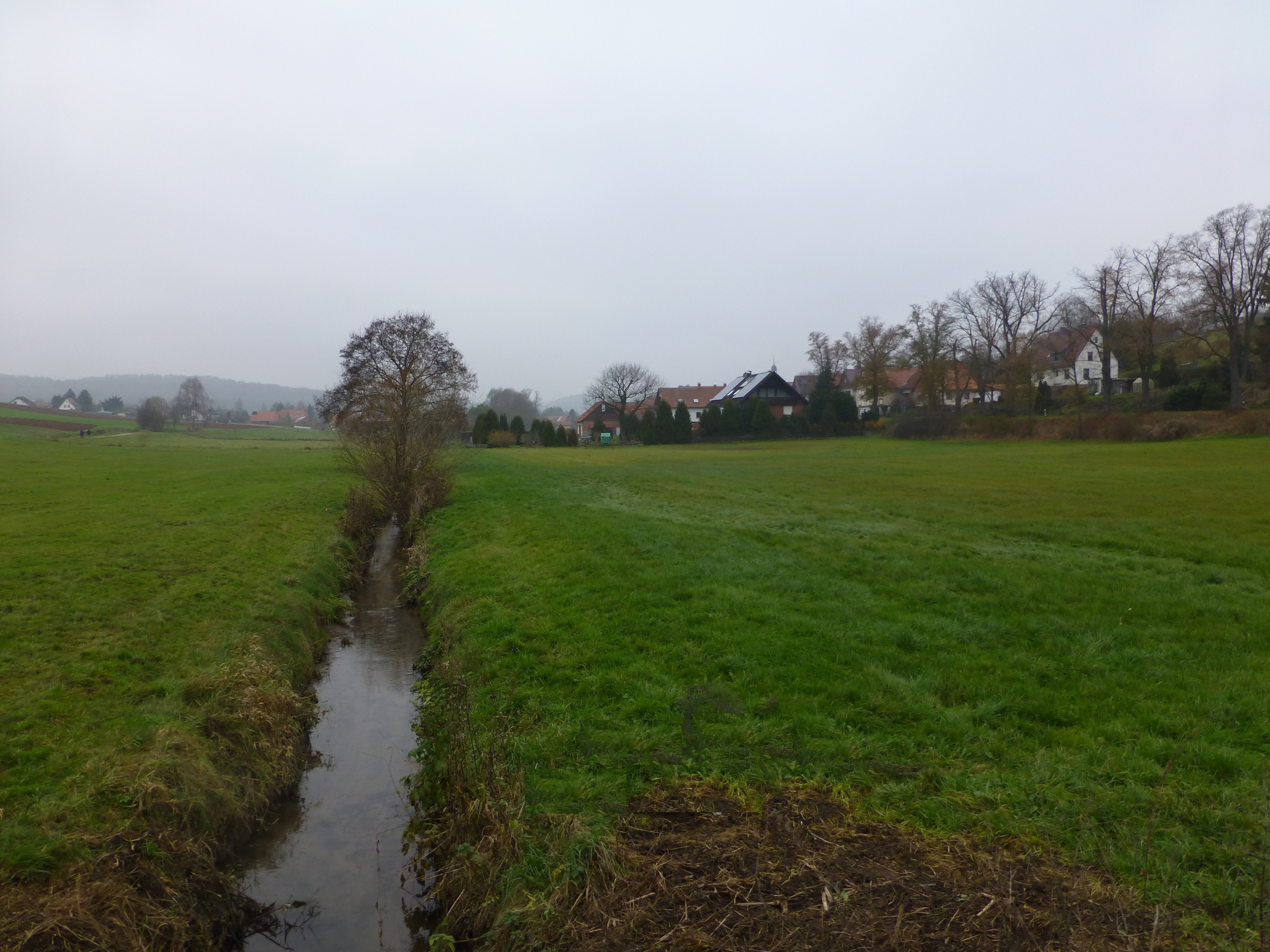
- The Suhle below Landolfshausen

Location
- Country: Germany
- State: Lower Saxony

Physical characteristics
- Source
  - location: In Mackenrode, a district of Landolfshausen
  - coordinates: 51.5294°N 10.0649°E
- Mouth
  - location: In Gieboldehausen into the Hahle
  - coordinates: 51.6092°N 10.2115°E

Basin features
- Progression: Hahle→ Rhume→ Leine→ Aller→ Weser→ North Sea

Suhle is a river of Lower Saxony, Germany.

The Suhle springs in Mackenrode, a district of Landolfshausen. It is a left tributary of the Hahle in Gieboldehausen.

== See also ==
- List of rivers of Lower Saxony
