= Neustadt, Eichsfeld =

Neustadt
- Ortsteil of Am Ohmberg
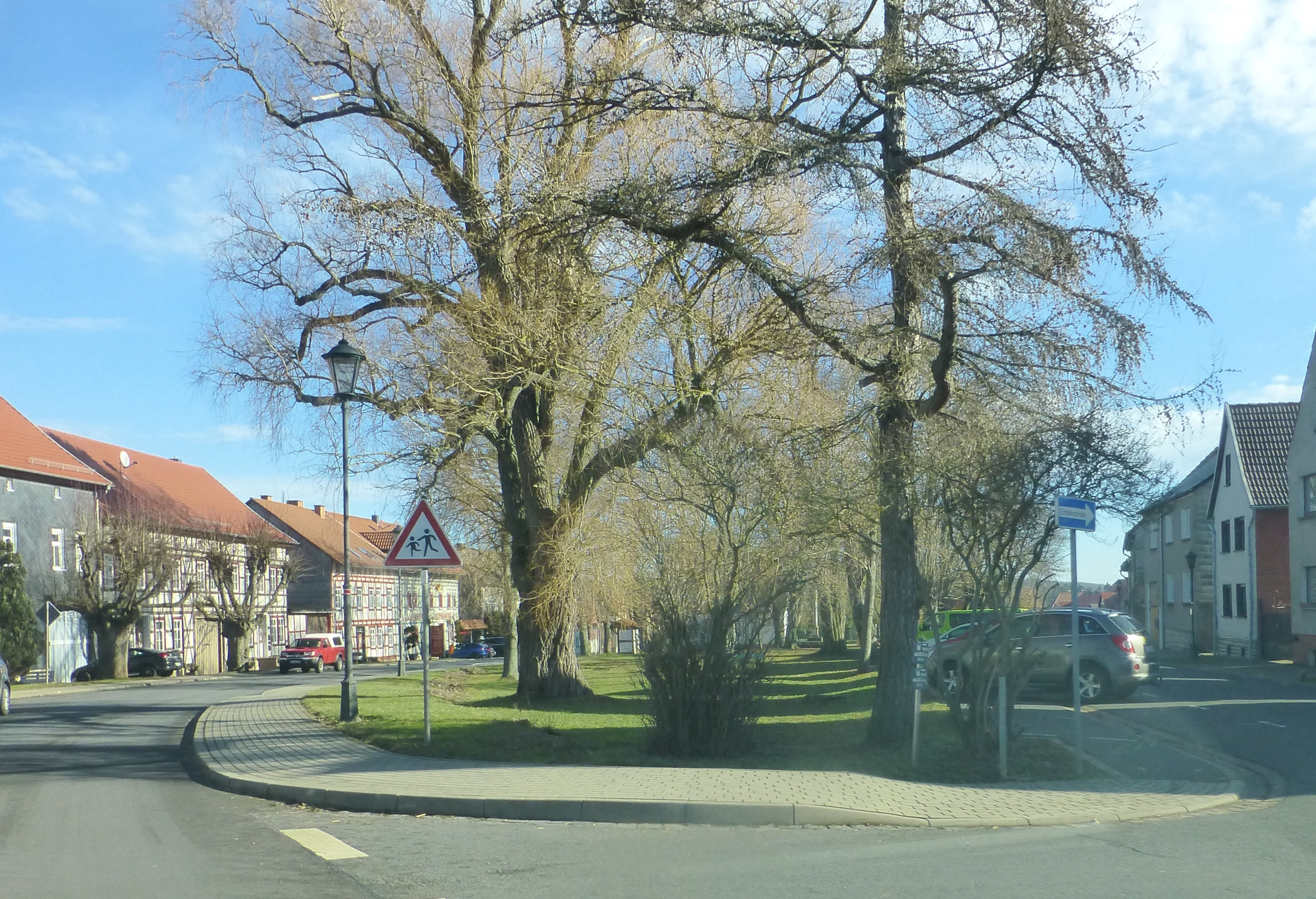

- Coat of arms
- Interactive map of Neustadt
- Location within Germany Location within Thuringia
- Coordinates: 51°28′3″N 10°27′52″E
- Country: Germany
- State: Thuringia
- District: Eichsfeld
- Municipality: Am Ohmberg

Area
  - Total: 3.59 km^{2} (1.39 sq mi)
- Elevation: 282–320 m (925–1,050 ft)

Population (2009-12-31)
  - Total: 722
  - Density: 201/km^{2} (521/sq mi)
- Time zone: UTC+01:00 (CET)
  - Summer (DST): UTC+02:00 (CEST)
- Postal codes: 37345
- Dialling codes: 036077
- Website: www.vg-eichsfeld-suedharz.de

Neustadt (German pronunciation: [ˈnɔʏʃtat]) is a village and a former municipality in the Eichsfeld district, in Thuringia, Germany. Since 1 December 2010, it is part of the municipality Am Ohmberg.
