= Kleinbartloff =

- Ortsteil of Niederorschel
- Coat of arms
- Interactive map of Kleinbartloff
- Location within Germany Location within Thuringia
- Coordinates: 51°21′7″N 10°23′4″E
- Country: Germany
- State: Thuringia
- District: Eichsfeld
- Municipality: Niederorschel

Area
  - Total: 12.63 km^{2} (4.88 sq mi)
- Elevation: 325 m (1,066 ft)

Population (2017-12-31)
  - Total: 415
  - Density: 32.9/km^{2} (85.1/sq mi)
- Time zone: UTC+01:00 (CET)
  - Summer (DST): UTC+02:00 (CEST)
- Postal codes: 37355
- Dialling codes: 036076
- Vehicle registration: EIC

Kleinbartloff (German pronunciation: [ˈklaɪnbaʁtˌlɔf]) is a village and a former municipality in the district of Eichsfeld in Thuringia, Germany. Since 1 January 2019, it has been part of the municipality of Niederorschel.
