= Wehnde =

- Municipality
- Coat of arms

- Location of Wehnde within Eichsfeld district
- Interactive map of Wehnde
- Location within Germany Location within Thuringia
- Coordinates: 51°28′53″N 10°18′47″E
- Country: Germany
- State: Thuringia
- District: Eichsfeld
- Municipal assoc.: Lindenberg/Eichsfeld

Government
  - Mayor (2022–28): Monique Haushälter

Area
  - Total: 9.71 km^{2} (3.75 sq mi)
- Elevation: 280 m (920 ft)

Population (2025-12-31)
  - Total: 359
  - Density: 37.0/km^{2} (95.8/sq mi)
- Time zone: UTC+01:00 (CET)
  - Summer (DST): UTC+02:00 (CEST)
- Postal codes: 37339
- Dialling codes: 036071
- Vehicle registration: EIC
- Website: www.lindenberg-eichsfeld.de

Wehnde is a municipality in the district of Eichsfeld in Thuringia, Germany.

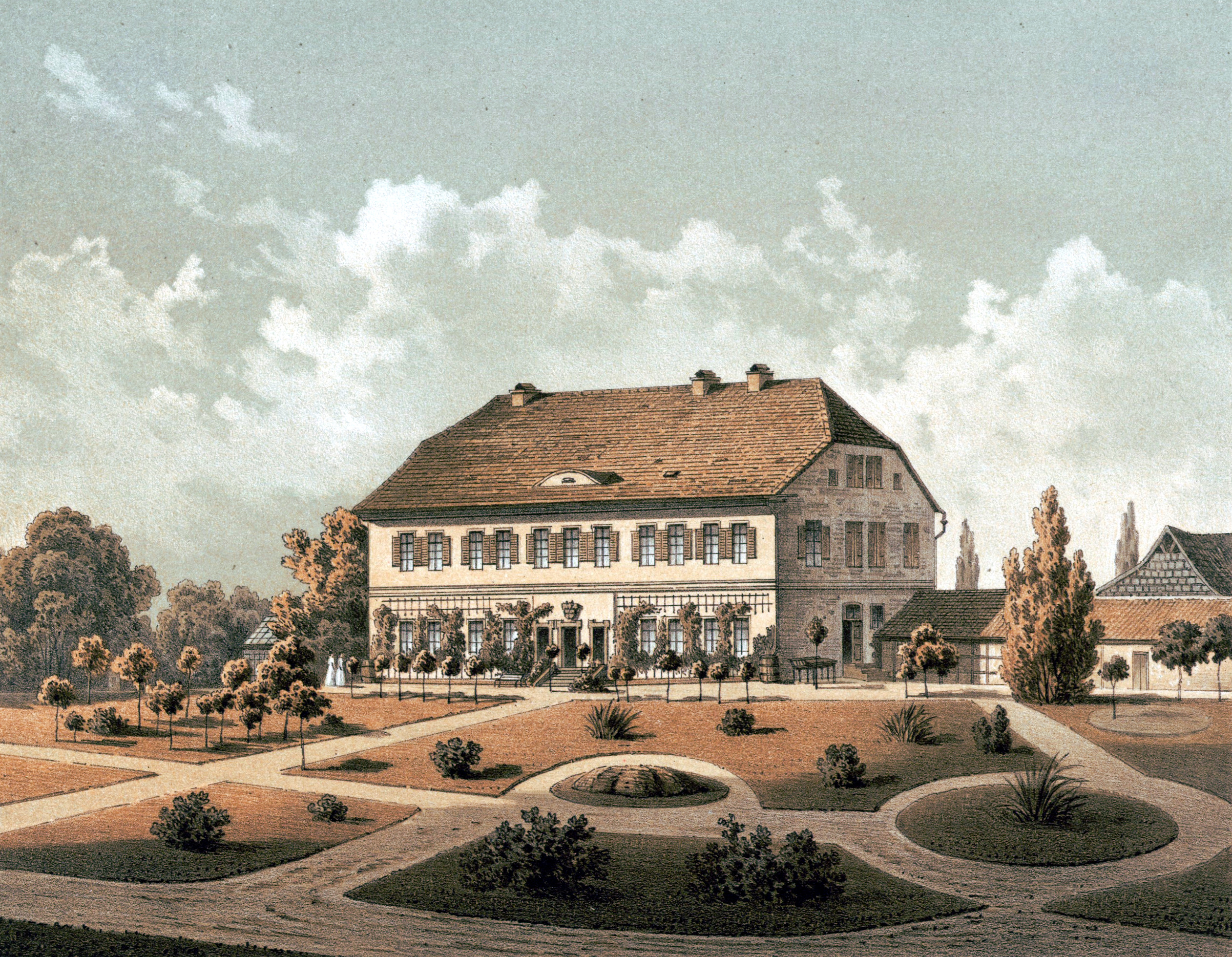
House Wehnde, around 1860, Edition by Alexander Duncker
