= Ferna =

- Municipality
- Coat of arms

- Location of Ferna within Eichsfeld district
- Interactive map of Ferna
- Location within Germany Location within Thuringia
- Coordinates: 51°27′25″N 10°18′26″E
- Country: Germany
- State: Thuringia
- District: Eichsfeld
- Municipal assoc.: Lindenberg/Eichsfeld

Government
  - Mayor (2022–28): Doreen May (CDU)

Area
  - Total: 4.44 km^{2} (1.71 sq mi)
- Elevation: 230 m (750 ft)

Population (2025-12-31)
  - Total: 519
  - Density: 117/km^{2} (303/sq mi)
- Time zone: UTC+01:00 (CET)
  - Summer (DST): UTC+02:00 (CEST)
- Postal codes: 37339
- Dialling codes: 036071
- Vehicle registration: EIC
- Website: www.lindenberg-eichsfeld.de

Ferna is a municipality in the district of Eichsfeld in Thuringia, Germany.
