= Tastungen =

- Municipality
- Coat of arms

- Location of Tastungen within Eichsfeld district
- Interactive map of Tastungen
- Location within Germany Location within Thuringia
- Coordinates: 51°28′4″N 10°18′35″E
- Country: Germany
- State: Thuringia
- District: Eichsfeld
- Municipal assoc.: Lindenberg/Eichsfeld

Government
  - Mayor (2021–27): Mario Nolte

Area
  - Total: 3.60 km^{2} (1.39 sq mi)
- Elevation: 226 m (741 ft)

Population (2025-12-31)
  - Total: 246
  - Density: 68.3/km^{2} (177/sq mi)
- Time zone: UTC+01:00 (CET)
  - Summer (DST): UTC+02:00 (CEST)
- Postal codes: 37339
- Dialling codes: 036071
- Vehicle registration: EIC
- Website: www.tastungen.de

Tastungen is a municipality in the district of Eichsfeld in Thuringia, Germany.
