= Deuna =

- Ortsteil of Niederorschel
- Coat of arms
- Interactive map of Deuna
- Location within Germany Location within Thuringia
- Coordinates: 51°21′N 10°28′E
- Country: Germany
- State: Thuringia
- District: Eichsfeld
- Municipality: Niederorschel

Area
  - Total: 12.82 km^{2} (4.95 sq mi)
- Elevation: 340 m (1,120 ft)

Population (2017-12-31)
  - Total: 1,157
  - Density: 90.25/km^{2} (233.7/sq mi)
- Time zone: UTC+01:00 (CET)
  - Summer (DST): UTC+02:00 (CEST)
- Postal codes: 37355
- Dialling codes: 036076

Deuna (German pronunciation: [ˈdɔʏna]) is a village and a former municipality in the district of Eichsfeld in Thuringia, Germany. Since 1 January 2019, it is part of the municipality Niederorschel.
