= Niederorschel =

- Municipality
- Coat of arms

- Location of Niederorschel within Eichsfeld district
- Interactive map of Niederorschel
- Location within Germany Location within Thuringia
- Coordinates: 51°22′10″N 10°25′36″E
- Country: Germany
- State: Thuringia
- District: Eichsfeld
- Subdivisions: 3

Government
  - Mayor (2019–25): Ingo Michalewski (CDU)

Area
  - Total: 55.73 km^{2} (21.52 sq mi)
- Elevation: 275 m (902 ft)

Population (2025-12-31)
  - Total: 5,357
  - Density: 96.12/km^{2} (249.0/sq mi)
- Time zone: UTC+01:00 (CET)
  - Summer (DST): UTC+02:00 (CEST)
- Postal codes: 37355
- Dialling codes: 036076
- Vehicle registration: EIC
- Website: www.eichsfelder-kessel.de

Niederorschel (German pronunciation: [ˈniːdɐˌʔɔʁʃl̩], lit. 'Lower Orschel', in contrast to "Upper Orschel") is a municipality in the district of Eichsfeld in Thuringia, Germany. The former municipalities Deuna, Gerterode, Hausen and Kleinbartloff were merged into Niederorschel in January 2019. It further includes the localities of Niederorschel, Oberorschel, and Rüdigershagen.
