= Berlingerode =

- Municipality
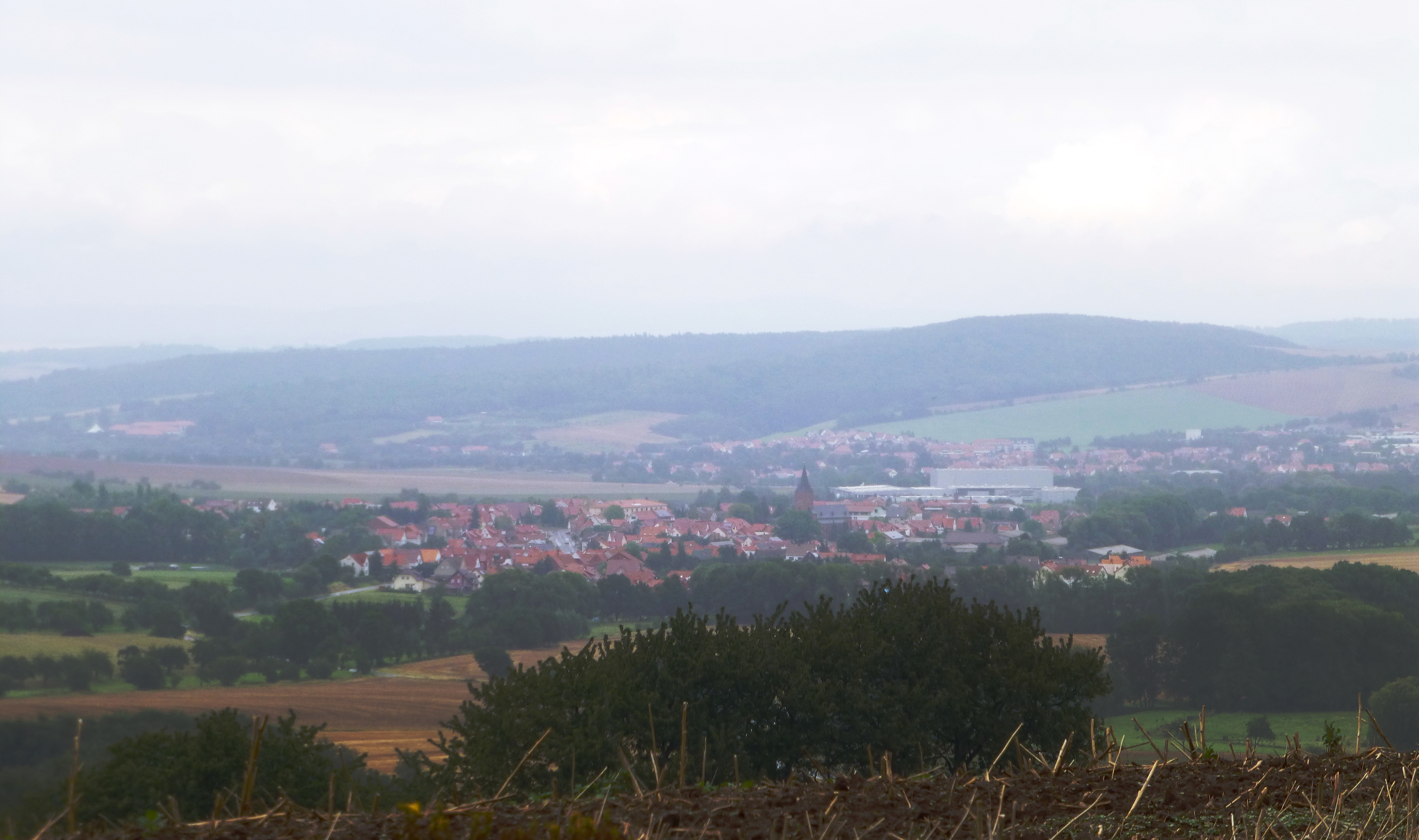
- Berlingerode

- Coat of arms

- Location of Berlingerode within Eichsfeld district
- Interactive map of Berlingerode
- Location within Germany Location within Thuringia
- Coordinates: 51°27′30″N 10°14′20″E
- Country: Germany
- State: Thuringia
- District: Eichsfeld
- Municipal assoc.: Lindenberg/Eichsfeld

Government
  - Mayor (2022–28): Simon Bley (CDU)

Area
  - Total: 11.66 km^{2} (4.50 sq mi)
- Elevation: 226 m (741 ft)

Population (2025-12-31)
  - Total: 1,192
  - Density: 102.2/km^{2} (264.8/sq mi)
- Time zone: UTC+01:00 (CET)
  - Summer (DST): UTC+02:00 (CEST)
- Postal codes: 37339
- Dialling codes: 036071
- Vehicle registration: EIC
- Website: www.gemeinde-berlingerode.de

Berlingerode is a municipality in the district of Eichsfeld in Thuringia, Germany.
