= Haynrode =

- Municipality
- Coat of arms

- Location of Haynrode within Eichsfeld district
- Interactive map of Haynrode
- Location within Germany Location within Thuringia
- Coordinates: 51°26′43″N 10°26′39″E
- Country: Germany
- State: Thuringia
- District: Eichsfeld
- Municipal assoc.: Eichsfeld-Wipperaue

Government
  - Mayor (2022–28): Andreas Heiroth

Area
  - Total: 15.03 km^{2} (5.80 sq mi)
- Elevation: 345 m (1,132 ft)

Population (2025-12-31)
  - Total: 688
  - Density: 45.8/km^{2} (119/sq mi)
- Time zone: UTC+01:00 (CET)
  - Summer (DST): UTC+02:00 (CEST)
- Postal codes: 37339
- Dialling codes: 036077
- Vehicle registration: EIC

Haynrode is a municipality in the Eichsfeld in Thuringia, Germany.
