= Buhla =

- Municipality
- Coat of arms

- Location of Buhla within Eichsfeld district
- Interactive map of Buhla
- Location within Germany Location within Thuringia
- Coordinates: 51°26′24″N 10°29′24″E
- Country: Germany
- State: Thuringia
- District: Eichsfeld
- Municipal assoc.: Eichsfeld-Wipperaue
- Subdivisions: 2 Ortsteile

Government
  - Mayor (2022–28): Rüdiger Wetterau

Area
  - Total: 8.74 km^{2} (3.37 sq mi)
- Elevation: 314 m (1,030 ft)

Population (2025-12-31)
  - Total: 464
  - Density: 53.1/km^{2} (138/sq mi)
- Time zone: UTC+01:00 (CET)
  - Summer (DST): UTC+02:00 (CEST)
- Postal codes: 37339
- Dialling codes: 036338
- Vehicle registration: EIC
- Website: www.eichsfeld-wipperaue.de

Buhla (German pronunciation: [ˈbuːla]) is a municipality in the district of Eichsfeld in Thuringia, Germany.
