= Kraja, Germany =

Kraja
- Ortsteil of Bleicherode
- Interactive map of Kraja
- Location within Germany Location within Thuringia
- Coordinates: 51°27′N 10°31′E
- Country: Germany
- State: Thuringia
- District: Nordhausen
- Town: Bleicherode

Area
  - Total: 4.43 km^{2} (1.71 sq mi)
- Elevation: 265 m (869 ft)

Population (2017-12-31)
  - Total: 301
  - Density: 67.9/km^{2} (176/sq mi)
- Time zone: UTC+01:00 (CET)
  - Summer (DST): UTC+02:00 (CEST)
- Postal codes: 99752
- Dialling codes: 036338

Kraja (German pronunciation: [ˈkʁaːja]) is a village and a former municipality in the district of Nordhausen, in Thuringia, Germany. Since 1 January 2019, it is part of the town Bleicherode.
