= Sollstedt =

- Municipality
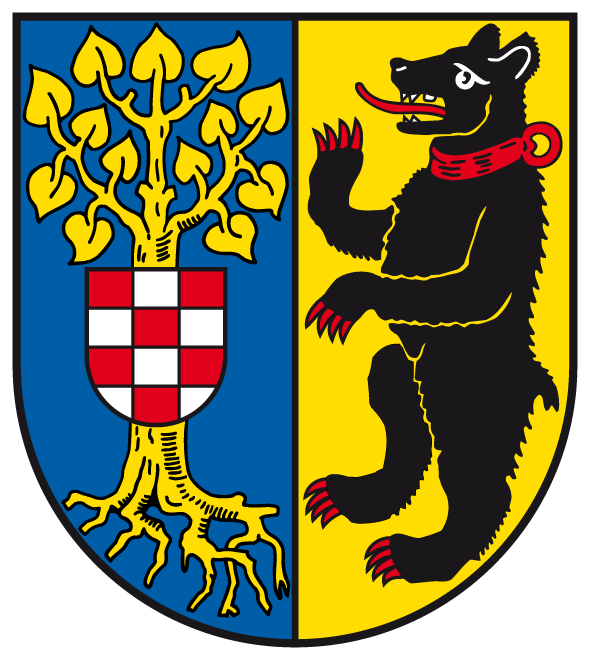
- Coat of arms

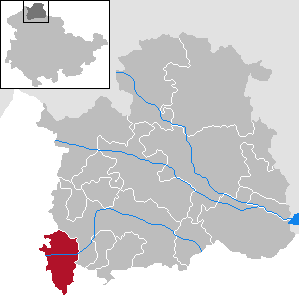
- Location of Sollstedt within Nordhausen district
- Interactive map of Sollstedt
- Location within Germany Location within Thuringia
- Coordinates: 51°24′56″N 10°32′2″E
- Country: Germany
- State: Thuringia
- District: Nordhausen

Government
  - Mayor (2022–28): Tobias Tressel (SPD)

Area
  - Total: 26.22 km^{2} (10.12 sq mi)
- Elevation: 260 m (850 ft)

Population (2025-12-31)
  - Total: 2,849
  - Density: 108.7/km^{2} (281.4/sq mi)
- Time zone: UTC+01:00 (CET)
  - Summer (DST): UTC+02:00 (CEST)
- Postal codes: 99759
- Dialling codes: 036338
- Vehicle registration: NDH
- Website: www.sollstedt.de

Sollstedt (German pronunciation: [ˈzɔlʃtɛt]) is a municipality in the district of Nordhausen, in Thuringia, Germany. On 1 January 2009, it incorporated the former municipality Rehungen. The municipality is conveniently located near the A38 motorway, making it easily accessible by car. The nearest train station is in Nordhausen, about 20 kilometers away.
