= Hahle =

River in Germany

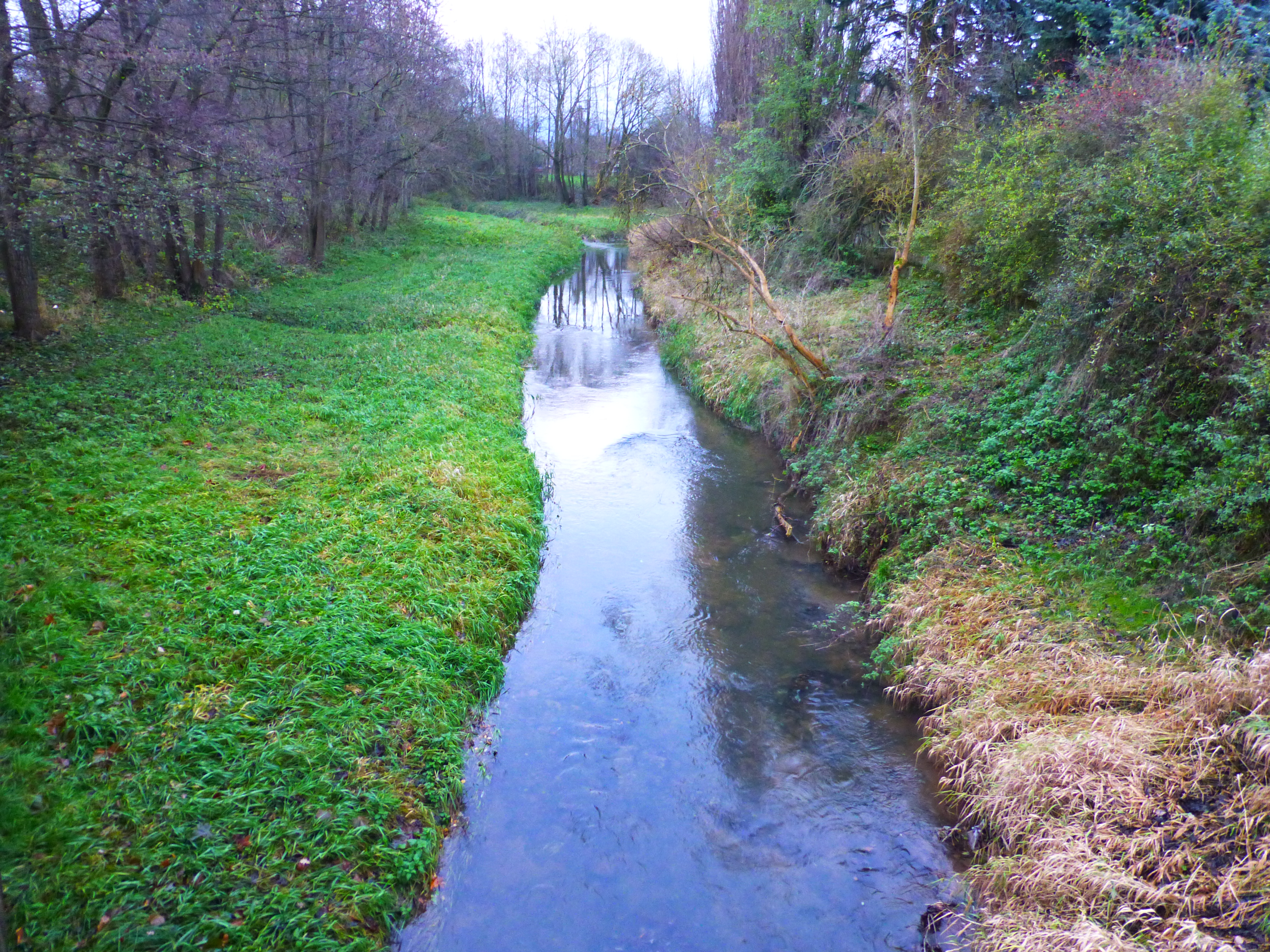

Location
- Country: Germany
- States: Thuringia and Lower Saxony

Physical characteristics
- Mouth
  - location: Rhume
  - coordinates: 51.6189°N 10.1996°E
- Length: 28 km (17 mi)
- Basin size: 294 km^{2} (114 sq mi)

Basin features
- Progression: Rhume→ Leine→ Aller→ Weser→ North Sea

Hahle is a river of Thuringia and of Lower Saxony, Germany. It joins the Rhume in Gieboldehausen.

== See also ==
- List of rivers of Thuringia
- List of rivers of Lower Saxony
