= Dün =

Mountain range in Thuringia, Germany

Coordinates: 51.3556°N 10.5111°E

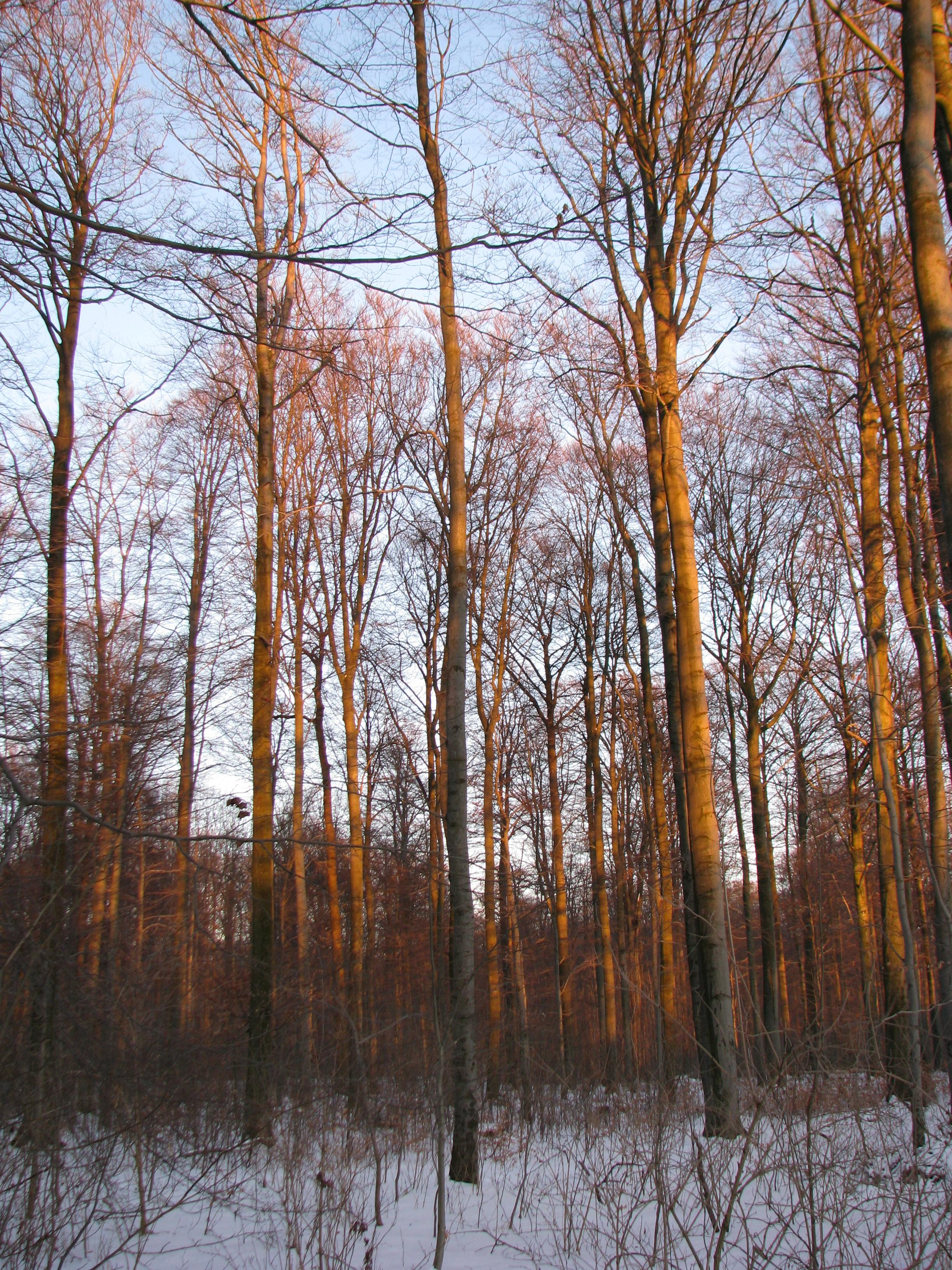
Hüpstedt Dünwald im Abendlicht

The Dün (German pronunciation: [dyːn]) is a hill chain in northwestern Thuringia, Germany. It runs west to east, and forms the northwestern edge of the Thuringian Basin. It separates the Thuringian Basin from the upper valley of the river Leine. Towards the east it continues in the Hainleite ridge. The highest point, 522 m above sea level, is near the village Vollenborn.
