= Wipper (Unstrut) =

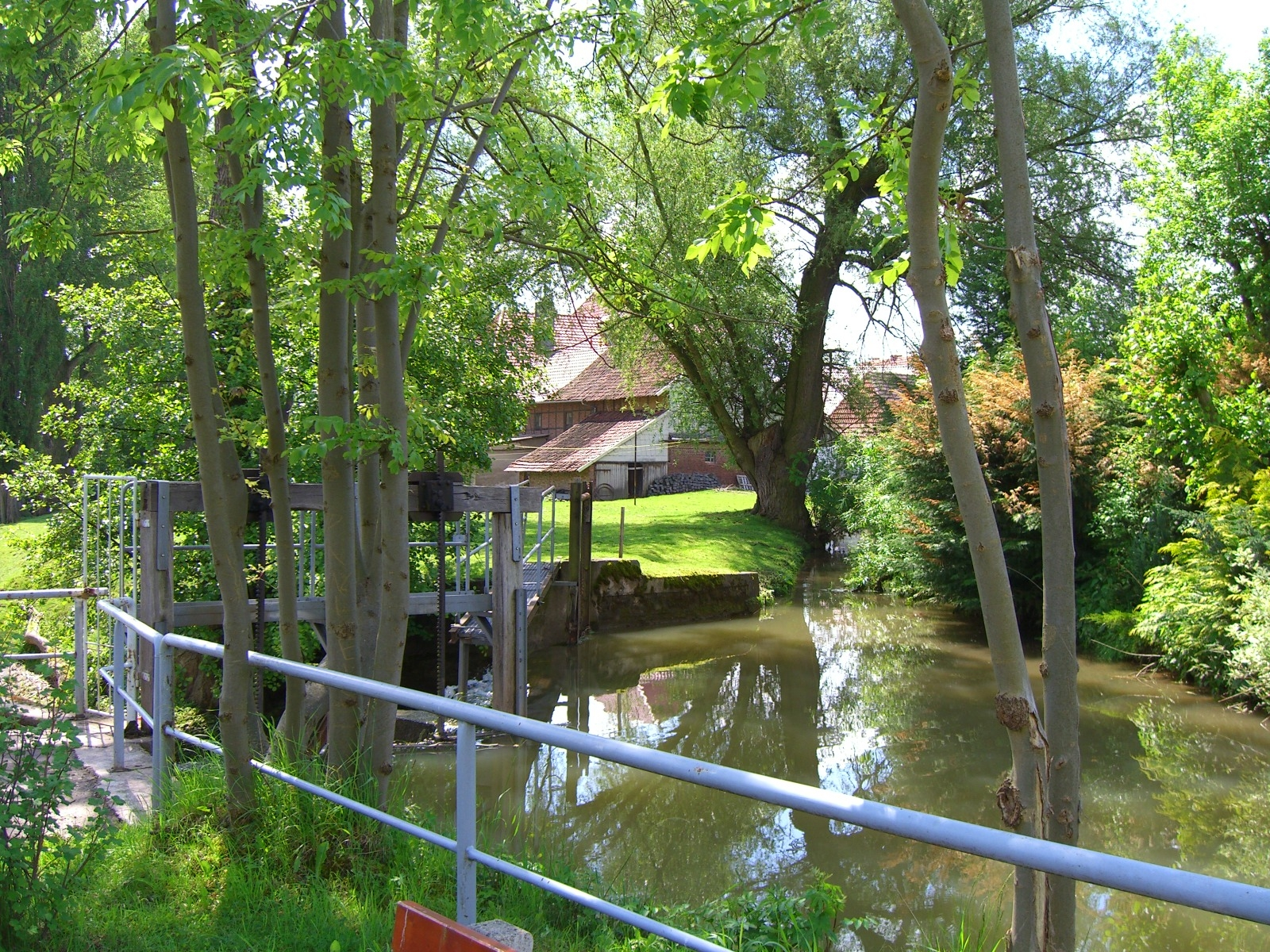

Location
- Country: Germany
- State: Thuringia

Physical characteristics
- Source
  - location: Eichsfeld
- Mouth
  - location: Unstrut
  - coordinates: 51°17′21″N 11°9′58″E
- Length: 95 km (59 mi)

Basin features
- Progression: Unstrut→ Saale→ Elbe→ North Sea

The Wipper (German pronunciation: [ˈvɪpɐ]) is a river in Thuringia, Germany, left tributary of the Unstrut. It originates in the Eichsfeld area, northwestern Thuringia, near Leinefelde-Worbis. The total length of the Wipper is 95 km. The Wipper joins the Unstrut near Heldrungen. Towns along the Wipper include Bleicherode and Sondershausen.

== See also ==
- List of rivers of Thuringia
