= Wheel of Mainz =

Coat of arms of Mainz

Version until 1992

Version from 1992–2008

Version from 2008

The Wheel of Mainz or Mainzer Rad (German pronunciation: [ˈmaɪntsɐ ˈʁaːt]), in German, was the coat of arms of the Archbishopric of Mainz and thus also of the Electorate of Mainz (Kurmainz), in Rhineland-Palatinate, Germany. It consists of a silver wheel with six spokes on a red background. The wheel can also be found in stonemasons' carvings (e.g. landmarks) and similar objects. Currently, the City of Mainz uses a double wheel connected by a silver cross.

== Origin ==
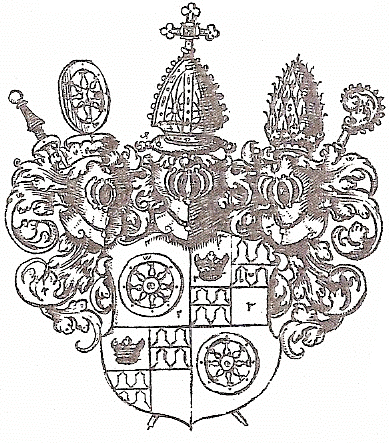
The arms of archbishop Johann Schweikhard von Kronberg.

The origins of the wheel are not known. One theory traces it back to Bishop Willigis, who was elected Archbishop of Mainz in 975. According to a tale delivered by the Brothers Grimm, his ancestors had been wheelwrights and his adversaries sneered at him for his mean birth. They drew wheels on the walls and doors of his residence, Willigis though made it his personal ensign with the motto "Willigis, remember where you came from". However, this is not proven, and in any case coats of arms only appeared in the 12th century. Most of the archbishops of Mainz used the wheel for the first and third field of their personal coat of arms, using their family's coat of arms for the second and fourth fields.

It is more likely that the wheel refers to Saint Martin, the patron of both the city itself and of Mainz Cathedral. Insignia dating from 1300 depict the saint with both wheels.

Other theories see the wheel as either:

- a symbol of Christ, i.e., XP (Chi, Ro), enclosed in a nimbus;
- the insignia of Emperor Constantine;
- the sign of Mogons, a Celtic sun-god; or
- the sign of Mithras, a Roman god.

== Dissemination ==
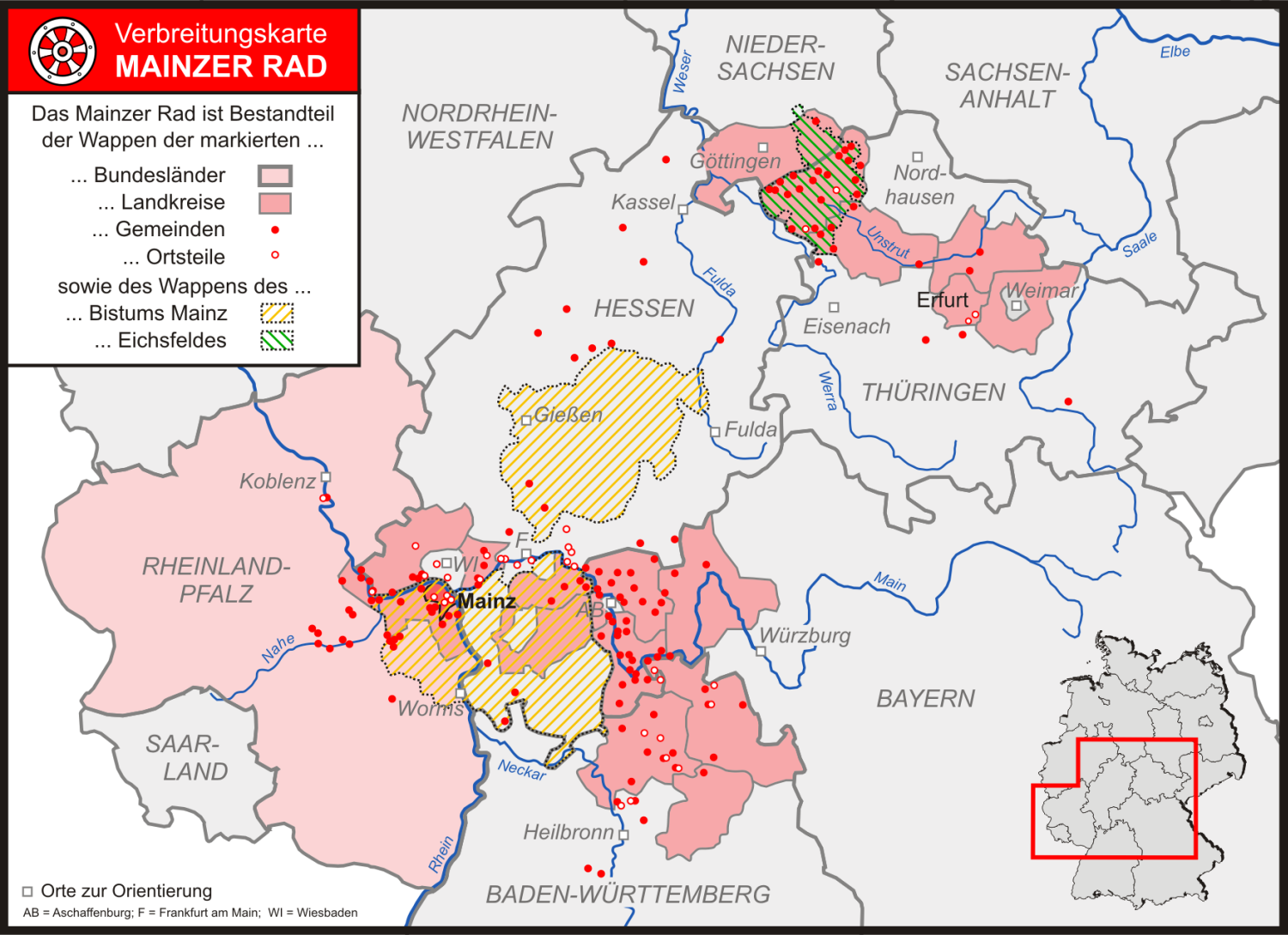
Dissemination of the Wheel of Mainz

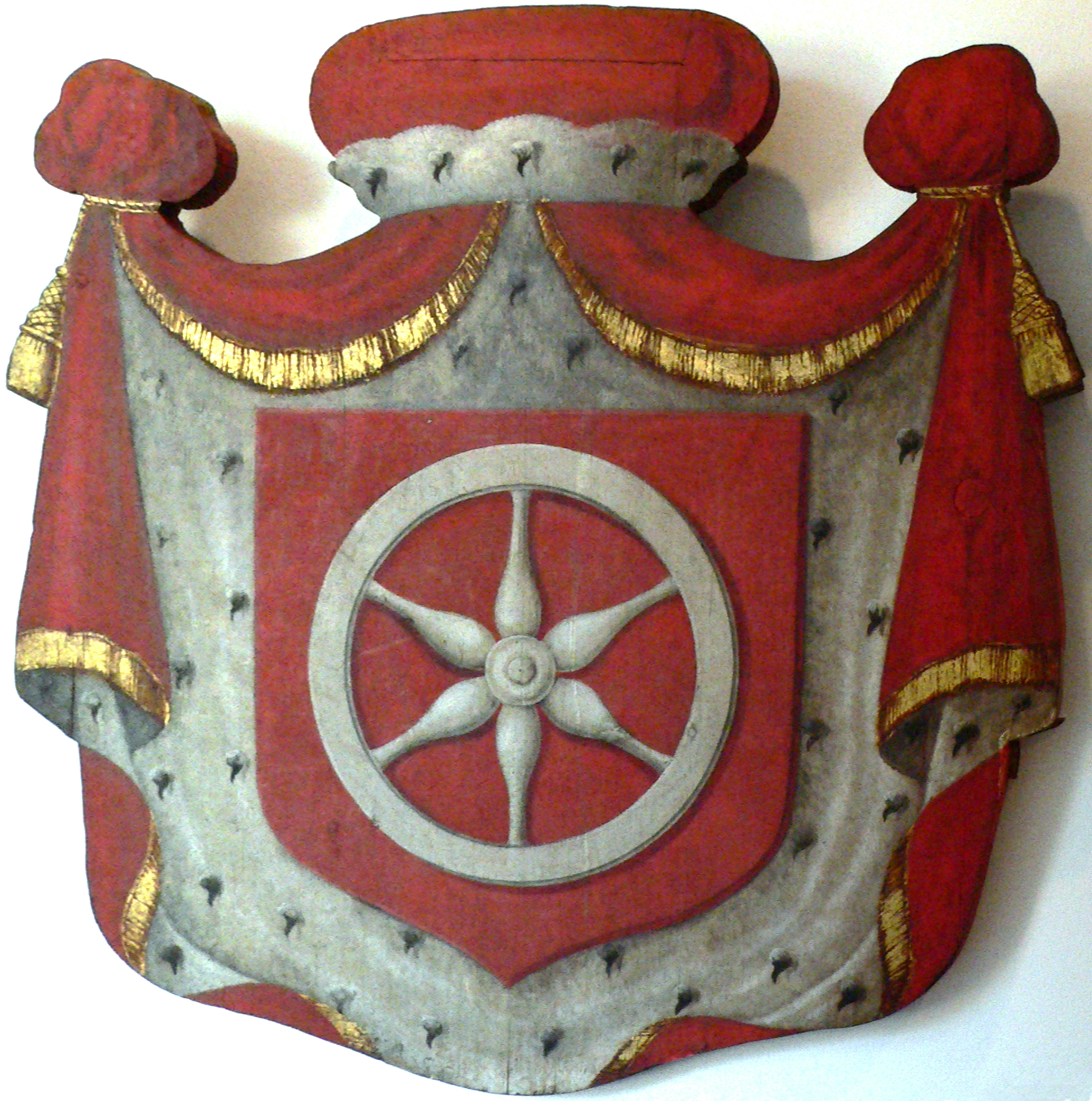
Armorial achievement of Kurmainz, mid 18th century (oil on wooden carving)

Coat of arms of Mainz, Napoleonic era

Due to the power wielded by the Elector until 1803, the Wheel of Mainz was recognized across a vast territory, and it can be seen in many coats of arms of towns belonging to the collegiate church, such as Erfurt, which belonged to the archbishopric for centuries. In addition, it is seen in the following coats of arms: Mainz-Hechtsheim, Mainz-Laubenheim, Mainz-Lerchenberg, Mainz-Weisenau, as well as Alzenau, Arenshausen, Bad Hersfeld, Bad Sobernheim, Berlingerode, Biebergemünd, Birkungen in Leinefelde-Worbis, Blankenbach, Bönnigheim, Brehme, Breitenworbis, Bürgstadt, Büttstedt, Cleebronn, Collenberg, Deuna, Dorfprozelten, Dünwald, Effelder, Eichenbühl, Eichsfeld, Elsenfeld, Eltville (ehemalige Residenz), Ortsteil Ershausen der Gemeinde Schimberg, Faulbach, Frammersbach, Frankfurt-Griesheim, Frankfurt-Höchst, Frankfurt-Nied, Freienhagen, Fritzlar, site of an important cathedral chapter, Gau-Algesheim, Geisenheim, Samtgemeinde Gieboldehausen, Gieboldehausen, Goldbach, Großbartloff, Großheubach, Großvargula, Gumbsheim, Haibach (Unterfranken), Hanau-Steinheim, Hausen (bei Aschaffenburg), Heilbad Heiligenstadt, Heppenheim (Bergstraße), Hergenfeld, Heyerode, Hofgeismar, Hofheim am Taunus, Holungen (Landkreis Eichsfeld), Hundeshagen, Johannesberg, Jützenbach, Kahl am Main, Kelkheim (Taunus), Kelkheim-Münster, Kella, Kirchgandern, Kirchheim, Thuringia, Kirchzell (Landkreis Miltenberg), Kleinostheim, Kleinwallstadt, Klingenberg am Main, Krautheim (Landkreis Hohenlohe), Kreuzebra, Langenthal (Hunsrück), Leidersbach, Verwaltungsgemeinschaft Lindenberg/Eichsfeld, Lorch (Rheingau), Mainaschaff, Marth, Miltenberg, Mömbris, Mönchberg, Monzingen, Mühlberg, Thuringia, Naumburg/Hessen, Neudenau (with eight spokes), the former Gemeinde Herbolzheim, since 1973 Herbolzheim, part of the city of Neudenau, Neunkirchen (Unterfranken), Neustadt (Eichsfeld), Niedernberg (Landkreis Miltenberg), Niederwalluf, Nöda, Obergriesheim, Oberlahnstein, Ober-Mörlen, Oberursel (Taunus), Pleitersheim, Rauenthal, Ravenstein, Reinholterode, Rieneck, Rodgau, Rohrberg, Röllbach, Rothenbuch, Sailauf, Schloßböckelheim, Schöllkrippen, Schöneberg (Hunsrück), Seesbach, Seligenstadt, Sömmerda, Sulzbach am Main (Landkreis Miltenberg), Treffurt, Uder, Viernheim, Waldaschaff, Walldürn, Weibersbrunn, Weilbach (Bayern), Weißenborn-Lüderode, Wiesen, Wittighausen, Worbis in Leinefelde-Worbis, and Wüstheuterode.

It also occurs in the coats of arms of the following Kreise (districts)

- Hohenlohekreis
- Landkreis Aschaffenburg
- the former Landkreis Buchen (merged with Neckar-Odenwald-Kreis in 1973)
- Landkreis Darmstadt-Dieburg
- Landkreis Eichsfeld
- Landkreis Göttingen
- the former Landkreis Künzelsau (merged with Hohenlohekreis in 1973)
- Landkreis Lohr
- Landkreis Main-Spessart
- Landkreis Mainz-Bingen
- Landkreis Miltenberg
- the former Landkreis Mosbach (merged with Neckar-Odenwald-Kreis in 1973)
- Landkreis Offenbach
- Landkreis Sömmerda
- the former Landkreis Tauberbischofsheim (merged with Main-Tauber-Kreis in 1973)
- Landkreis Weimarer Land
- Main-Tauber-Kreis
- Main-Taunus-Kreis
- Neckar-Odenwald-Kreis
- Rheingau-Taunus-Kreis
- Unstrut-Hainich-Kreis

It also features in the arms of Rhineland-Palatinate itself.

=== Coats of Arms featuring the Wheel of Mainz ===
==== Rhineland-Palatinate ====
Rhineland-Palatinate

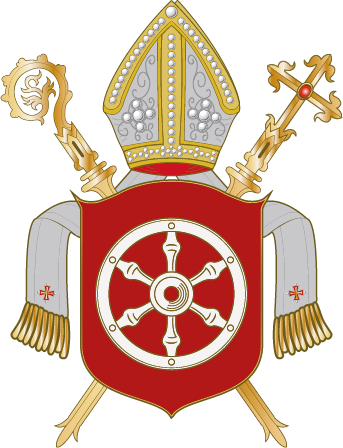
Archbishopric of Mainz

Mainz-Hechtsheim

Mainz-Lerchenberg

Mainz-Weisenau

Mainz-Bingen

Bad Sobernheim

Bingen am Rhein

Gau-Algesheim

Gau-Bischofsheim

Heidesheim am Rhein

Hergenfeld

Klein-Winternheim

Langenthal (Hunsrück)

Monzingen

Nackenheim

Niederheimbach

Ober-Olm

Pleitersheim

Schloßböckelheim

Schöneberg (Hunsrück)

Seesbach

Trechtingshausen

Wöllstein

Wöllstein

==== Hesse ====
Rheingau-Taunus-Kreis

Biebergemünd

Eltville

Neustadt

Amöneburg

Heppenheim

Kiedrich

Lorch (Rheingau)

Main-Taunus-Kreis

Kriftel

Darmstadt-Dieburg

Kreis Offenbach

Hainburg

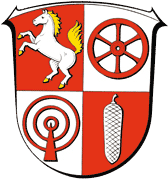
Mainhausen

Oberursel (Taunus)

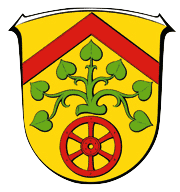
Rödermark

Rodgau

Seligenstadt

Ober-Mörlen

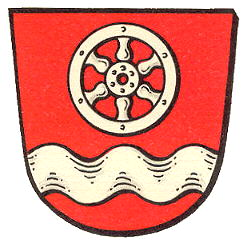
Frankfurt-Griesheim

Frankfurt-Höchst

Frankfurt-Nied

Gernsheim

Hofgeismar

Hofheim am Taunus

Fritzlar

Naumburg

Wetter (Hessen)

Geisenheim (before 1977)

Geisenheim (since 1977)

==== Baden-Württemberg ====
Hohenlohekreis

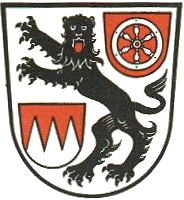
former Landkreis Künzelsau, merged with Hohenlohekreis in 1973

Neckar-Odenwald-Kreis

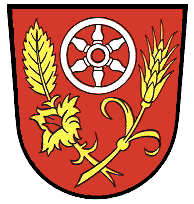
former Landkreis Buchen, merged with Neckar-Odenwald-Kreis in 1973

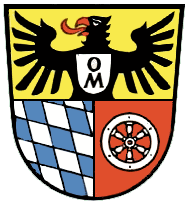
former Landkreis Mosbach, merged with Neckar-Odenwald-Kreis in 1973

Main-Tauber-Kreis

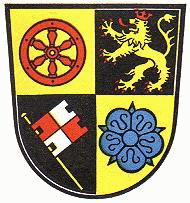
former Landkreis Tauberbischofsheim, merged with Main-Tauber-Kreis in 1973

Tauberbischofsheim

Billigheim

Buchen

Cleebronn

Mudau

Neudenau

former Gemeinde Herbolzheim, now Herbolzheim (Neudenau), part of the city of Neudenau since 1973

former Gemeinde Obergriesheim, part of the city of Gundelsheim since 1973

Osterburken

Ravenstein

Rosenberg

Seckach

Walldürn

Viernheim

Krautheim

Kelkheim

Bönnigheim

==== Bavaria ====
Landkreis Aschaffenburg

Alzenau

Blankenbach

Goldbach

Großwelzheim

Haibach

Johannesberg

Kahl am Main

Kleinostheim

Mainaschaff

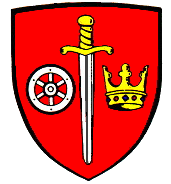
Mömbris

Rothenbuch

Sailauf

Schöllkrippen

Waldaschaff

Weibersbrunn

Wiesen

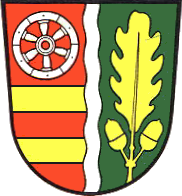
Landkreis Lohr

Landkreis Miltenberg

Bürgstadt

Collenberg

Dorfprozelten

Eichenbühl

Elsenfeld

Faulbach

Großheubach

Hausen bei Aschaffenburg

Kirchzell

Kleinwallstadt

Klingenberg am Main

Leidersbach

Stadt Miltenberg

Mömlingen

Mönchberg

Neunkirchen

Niedernberg

Röllbach

Sulzbach am Main

Weilbach (Bayern)

Assamstadt?

Werbach

Wittighausen

Landkreis Main-Spessart

Rieneck

Frammersbach

==== Thuringia ====
Erfurt (Partner of Mainz)

Principality of Erfurt (1807–14)

Landkreis Eichsfeld

Arenshausen

Breitenworbis

Büttstedt

Deuna

Effelder

Freienhagen

Großbartloff

Heilbad Heiligenstadt

Hohes Kreuz

Holungen

Jützenbach

Kella, Thuringia

Kirchgandern

Kreuzebra

Administrative region of Lindenberg-Eichsfeld

Berlingerode (in Lindenberg-Eichsfeld)

Brehme (in Lindenberg-Eichsfeld)

Hundeshagen (in Lindenberg-Eichsfeld)

Marth

Neustadt (Eichsfeld)

Reinholterode

Rohrberg

Uder

Weißenborn-Lüderode

Wüstheuterode

Landkreis Sömmerda

Sömmerda

Unstrut-Hainich-Kreis

Landkreis Weimarer Land

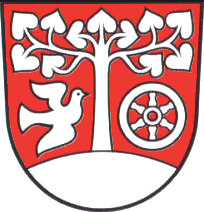
Nöda

Dünwald

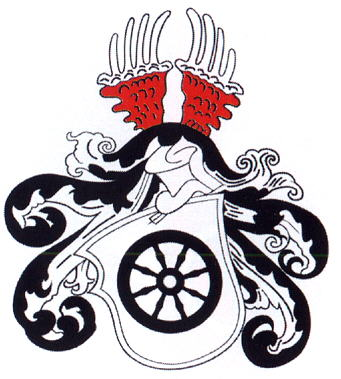
Großvargula

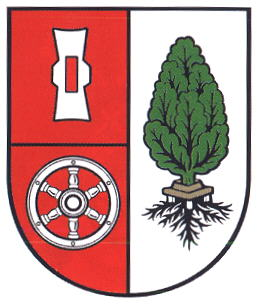
Heyerode

Kirchheim

Mühlberg

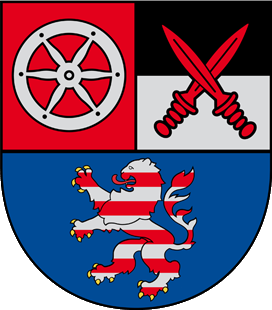
Treffurt

Birkungen, in Leinefelde-Worbis

Ershausen, in Schimberg

Worbis, in Leinefelde-Worbis

==== Lower Saxony ====
Landkreis Göttingen

Samtgemeinde Gieboldehausen

Gieboldehausen

==== Bishops ====
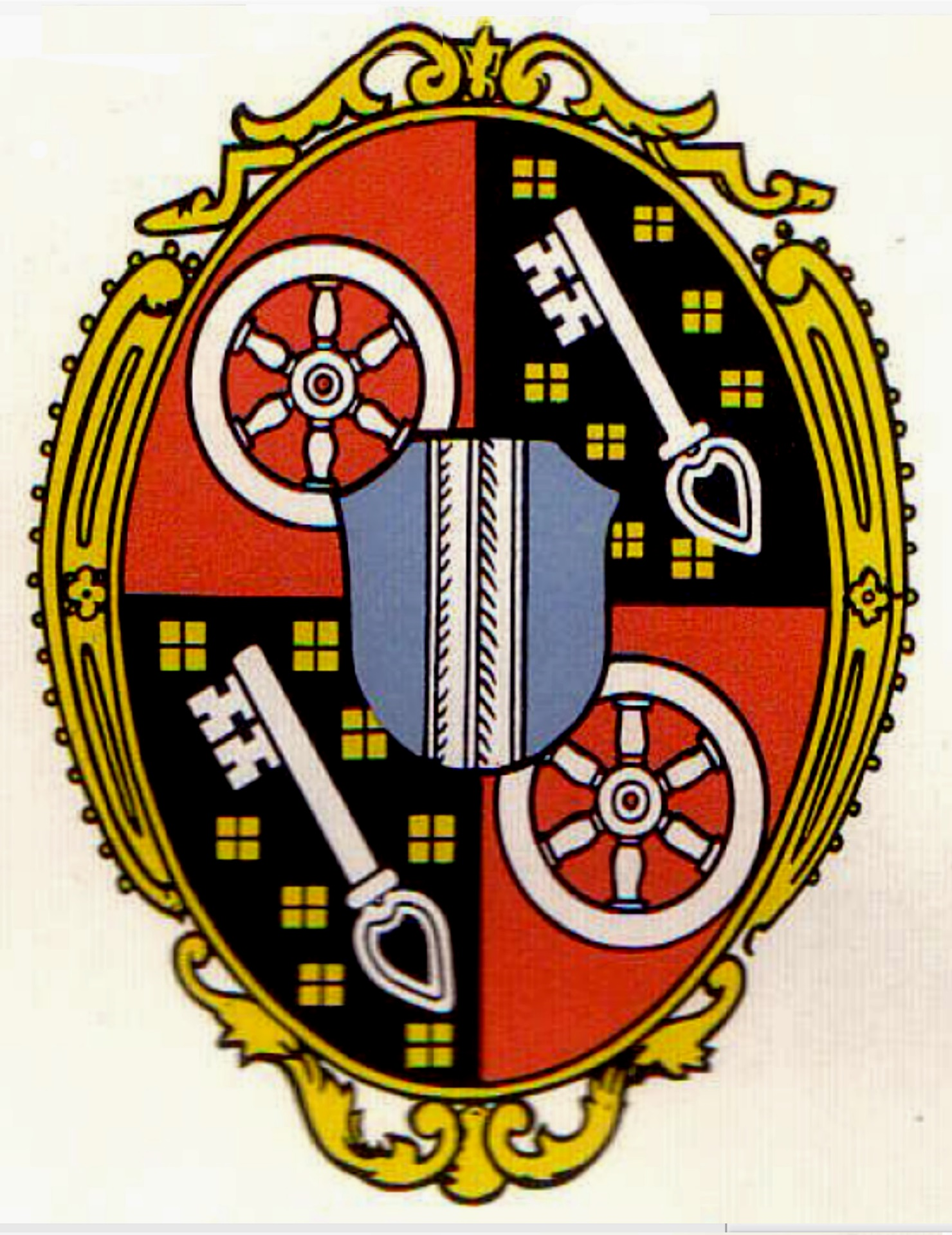
Damian Hartard von der Leyen-Hohengeroldseck

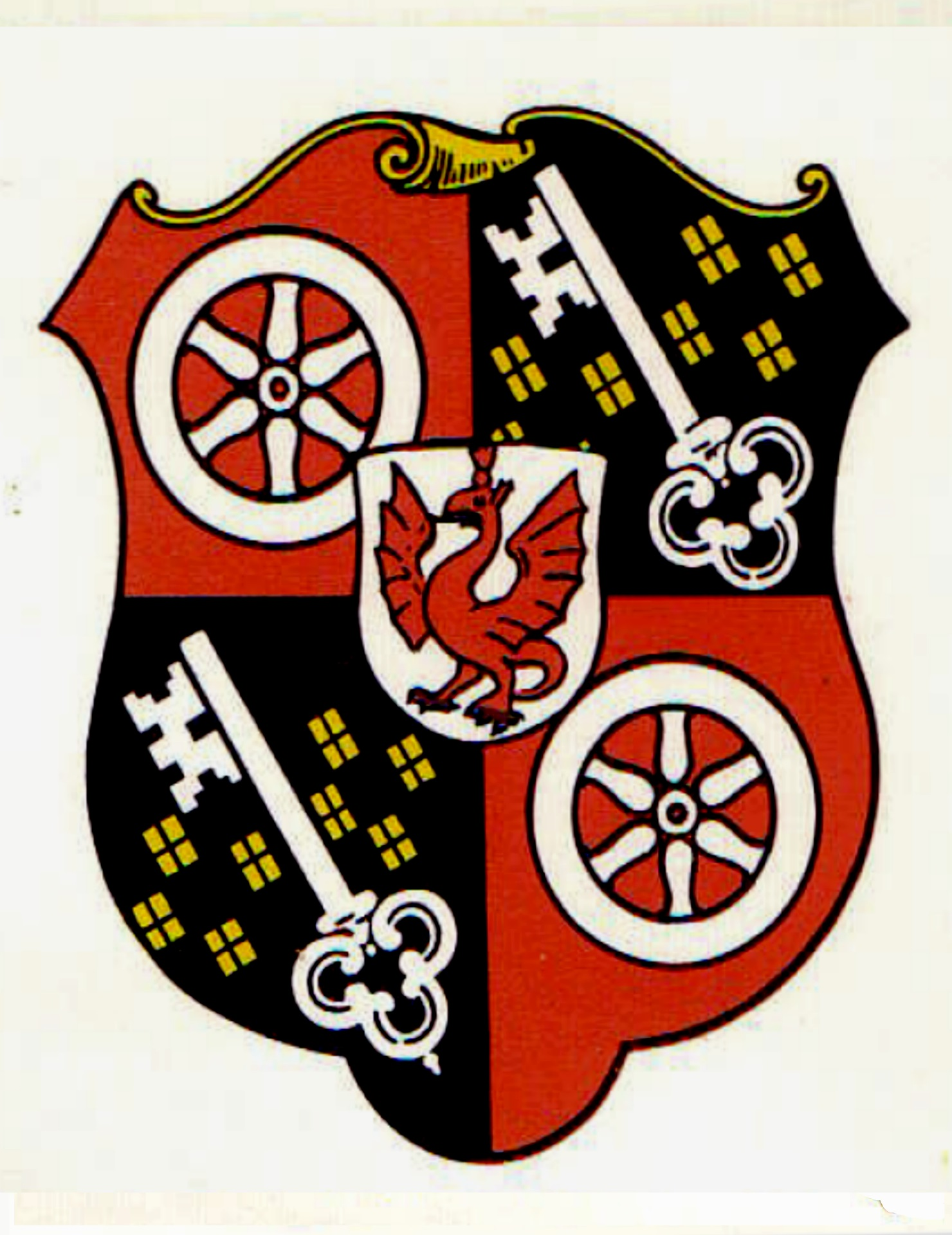
Emmerich Joseph von Breidbach zu Bürresheim

Hermann Volk

Karl Lehmann

Peter Kohlgraf

=== German municipal arms with wheels which have no connection to Mainz ===
- Donnersbergkreis: The two wheels come from the earlier arms of Kirchheimbolanden and Rockenhausen. The red wheel represented the line of Bolanden, the blue represented the line of Hohenfels.
- Osnabrück: this city's arms have a black, or sometimes red, wheel of six spokes on a silver field. The flag is white with black border stripes. A wheel is known as a device on coins of the Archdiocese of Osnabrück and appears in seals of as early as the 13th century, although during the course of time it was altered many times, the originally red wheel having become black by 1496. Later the red colour was re-adopted, but the black tincture has won out. In the 13th century Saint Peter was portrayed next to the wheel, as patron of the cathedral.
- The coat of arms of Störmede includes two red five-spoked cartwheels and two red five-petalled roses in the quarters of the black cross of the Archbishops and Electors of Cologne (Kurköln). The rose represents the noble family which had its ancestral home in Störmede since 1233 (compare the coat of arms of the von Lippe family). After Albert von Störmede bequeathed his fief to his son-in-law Friedrich von Hörde, the cartwheel of the von Hördes was added to the roses.
- Geseke: the current coat of arms was adopted on 17 August 1977, replacing the silver cross which had been adopted on 16 November 1902. The silver cross had appeared on seals as early as the late Middle Ages, the earliest example dating from 1237. It is related to the arms of the Archbishopric of Cologne, a black cross on silver. The cross was first used as a coat of arms officially around 1700. The wheel of Störmede was added to the coat of arms after a reform of districts united Störmede with Geseke.
Donnersbergkreis

Marnheim in Donnersbergkreis

Osnabrück

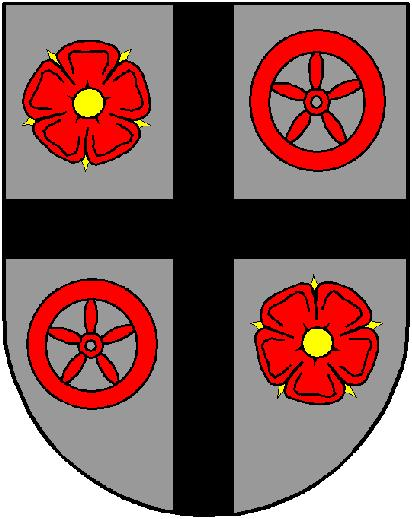
Störmede

Geseke

Breunigweiler

Imsbach

Mühlheim am Main (waterwheel)

Heimbuchenthal

Bohmte

Neckarzimmern

Dörzbach
