= Neu-Eichenberg =

- Municipality
- Coat of arms

- Location of Neu-Eichenberg within Werra-Meißner-Kreis district
- Interactive map of Neu-Eichenberg
- Location within Germany Location within Hesse
- Coordinates: 51°23′N 09°53′E
- Country: Germany
- State: Hesse
- Admin. region: Kassel
- District: Werra-Meißner-Kreis

Government
  - Mayor (2022–28): Marcus Stolle (SPD)

Area
  - Total: 27.53 km^{2} (10.63 sq mi)
- Elevation: 205–477 m (673–1,565 ft)

Population (2025-12-31)
  - Total: 1,775
  - Density: 64.48/km^{2} (167.0/sq mi)
- Time zone: UTC+01:00 (CET)
  - Summer (DST): UTC+02:00 (CEST)
- Postal codes: 37249
- Dialling codes: 05542 (Eichenberg), 05504 (other districts)
- Vehicle registration: ESW
- Website: www.neu-eichenberg.de

Neu-Eichenberg is a municipality in the Werra-Meißner-Kreis district of northern Hesse, Germany. It was formed on February 1, 1971, from the merger of the municipalities of Berge, Eichenberg, Hebenshausen, Hermannrode, and Marzhausen in the northeastern tip of the Werra-Meißner district, on the border with Thuringia and Lower Saxony. The total area is quite small, with it only being 2,753 hectares.

== Geography ==
=== Location ===
Neu-Eichenberg lies near the three-state common point shared by Hesse, Thuringia and Lower Saxony between Kassel (45 km) and Göttingen (12 km). It is included in the Lower Saxon hills and extends between the Werra and Leine rivers.

=== Neighbouring communities ===
Neu-Eichenberg borders in the north on the community of Friedland (in Lower Saxony's Göttingen district), in the east on the communities of Hohengandern and Bornhagen (both in Thuringia’s Eichsfeld district) and in the south and west on the town of Witzenhausen (Werra-Meißner-Kreis).

=== Constituent communities ===
Neu-Eichenberg is made up of seven places named Berge, Neuenrode, Eichenberg Bahnhof, Eichenberg Dorf, Hebenshausen (administrative seat), Hermannrode and Marzhausen, but its five Ortsteile are Berge (Berge and Neuenrode), Eichenberg (Bahnhof and Dorf), Hebenshausen, Hermannrode and Marzhausen.

=== Physical geography ===
Neu‑Eichenberg is defined by A hilly terrain within the broader Werra‑Meißner region, with elevations spanning from low valleys to nearly 480m high ridges. Notably, the nearby “Auf der Schärfe” ridge (within the Sandwald uplands) rises to 477.2 m and stands as the area’s highest point.

== History ==
=== District of Berge ===
The Berge district was first mentioned in writing in the 12th century. From 1246 to 1623, a wealthy noble family in the area they cultivated named itself after the place. During the 15th century, the aforementioned Lords of Berge and the Bischoffshausen family held vassals. The Lords of Plesse and the Dukes of Brunswick were tgfeudal lords. From this time on, the Bischoffshausen family dominated the village's fortunes until the 19th century. Significant evidence of the family's influence on local history is the local church, which served as a burial place for some members of the clan.

The Neuenrode estate lies northwest of the village. First documented as a settlement in the 10th century, Neuenrode was twice described as deserted during the 16th century. The core of the estate's buildings that are still preserved today dates from the late 18th century.

With fewer than 200 inhabitants, Berge is the smallest district in the municipality in terms of population.

=== Eichenberg district ===
The village has three distinct settlement zones:

In the western part of the district lies the historic core of the village, characterized by a multitude of high-quality cultural monuments and a comprehensive overall complex. Typical are half-timbered buildings from the late 18th and early 19th centuries, whose framework grid is reinforced by K-beams.

To the east of the village, beyond the B27, about 2 km away, is the Eichenberg Bahnhof sub-site. Of note is the railway workers' settlement, which was built around the station at the end of the 19th century. As part of the village renewal program, the village center was renovated in the early 1990s.

A third building of note is Arnstein Castle in the south of the Eichenberg district (approx. 2 km away).

The earliest documented mention of the village dates back to 1258. A property register of the Counts of Blankenburg mentions forest ownership in "silvam de Eikenberge." At the end of the Hessian-Thuringian War of Succession, Arnstein Castle came into the possession of the Landgrave of Hesse. After several changes of Landgrave of Hesse's vassals, the von Bodenhausen family was granted it in 1434 and it stayed this way until 1827.

In 1840/1850, lignite mining took place on the eastern edge of the town. In 1858, the Halle-Kassel railway line was built, followed twenty years later by the Göttingen-Bebra line.

With about 750 inhabitants, Eichenberg is the largest district in terms of population.

=== District of Hermannrode ===
In a side valley of the Molle River, 7 km northeast of Witzenhausen, lies the village of Hermannrode.

The village was first recorded in 1267 as "Hermeroth," with the mention of a "plebanus," or clergyman. An "ecclesie," or church, the remains of which have survived in the masonry of the preserved tower, first appears in 1305. By the mid-15th century, as evidenced by the reference "deserted settlement called zcu Hermernrade," the village was deserted. At this time, the von Bodenhausen family was enfeoffed with the settlement by the Hessian Landgrave. This continued until 1827.

The historical settlement structure is remarkable, with the church, essentially medieval in its core, rising as a fortified structure on a hill. Farm complexes are grouped around it, with residential buildings mostly dating from the late 18th and early 19th centuries.

Hermannrode has about 250 inhabitants.

=== Marzhausen district ===
Marzhausen, located on the border with the Göttingen district, is the northernmost district of the former Witzenhausen district.

Until the second half of the 16th century, the settlement, first mentioned around 1120, was extremely complex in its feudal and ownership structures. During this period, the Archbishopric of Mainz, the Mariengarten Monastery, the Wilhelmites in Witzenhausen, and the Lords of Ziegenberg and Plesse were wealthy.

Since around 1550, the Hessian Landgraves were feudal lords of Marzhausen. The Duchy of Brunswick also laid claim to the property there. Final recognition of Hessian sovereignty did not occur until 1831/32.

Along the main road through the village, several listed half-timbered buildings, mostly dating from the late 18th or early 19th century, are lined up. To the southwest of the village, there is an estate with historic buildings in a park-like setting.

Marzhausen has a population of approximately 180.

=== Hebenshausen district ===
The Hebenshausen district, located 7 km north of Witzenhausen on the B27 highway, was first documented in the 10th century. A significant feudal lord throughout the town's history was the Bischoffshausen family, who received property from the Hessian Landgrave and the Duke of Brunswick.

The town's particular regional significance lies in its documented Jewish community, first mentioned in 1603 and 1606, respectively. In 1745, 20 Jews were recorded as living there, and by 1830, 92 were recorded. The existence of a synagogue is documented for the mid-18th century, and the construction of a new synagogue was reported in 1848. Today, it serves as a storage shed, making it the only remaining synagogue of its kind in the old Witzenhausen district.

Further evidence of the Jewish population in Hebenshausen is the Jewish cemetery, located approximately 2 km north of the town.

The community of Neu-Eichenberg came into being in the course of municipal reform in Hesse on 1 February 1971 through the willing merger of the formerly self-administering communities of Berge, Eichenberg, Hebenshausen, Hermannrode and Marzhausen.

== Politics ==
=== Community council ===
The municipal election in 2026 yielded the following results:

Parties and voter communities		% 2026	Seats 2026	% 2021	Seats; 2021	% 2016	Seats; 2016
SPD	Social Democratic Party of Germany	34.1	5	30.0	5	43.2	7
MfNEB	Miteinander für Neu‑Eichenberg	32.3	5	36.0	5		
CDU	Christian Democratic Union of Germany	18.7	3	13.2	2	24.9	4
GREENS	Bündnis 90/Die Grünen	14.9	2	16.4	2	13.8	2
DIE LINKE	The Left	N/A	N/A	4.5	1	18.1	2
Total		100.0	15	100.0	15	100.0	15
Voter turnout in %		61.4		69.2		51.8	

== Economy and infrastructure ==
=== Transport ===
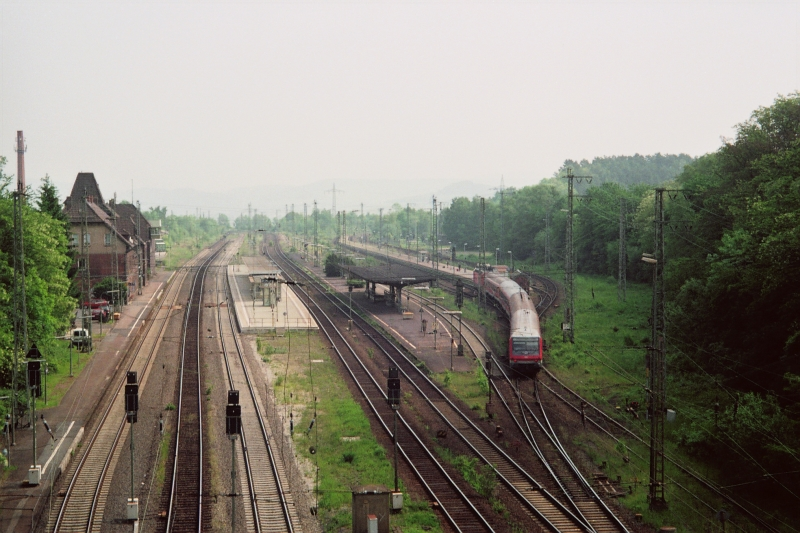
Eichenberg railway station

Eichenberg's railway station is a junction of the old North–south line and the Halle-Kassel line. There are connections to Kassel, Göttingen, Erfurt and Fulda. These are served by regional trains of Deutsche Bahn, cantus and Abellio.

The community earned special importance through the Verkehrsprojekt Deutsche Einheit (German Unity Transport Project) number 6 (rail), which saw the reconnection of the Eichenberg-Halle line formerly severed by the Inner German Border between East and West Germany.
