= Witzenhausen =

- Town
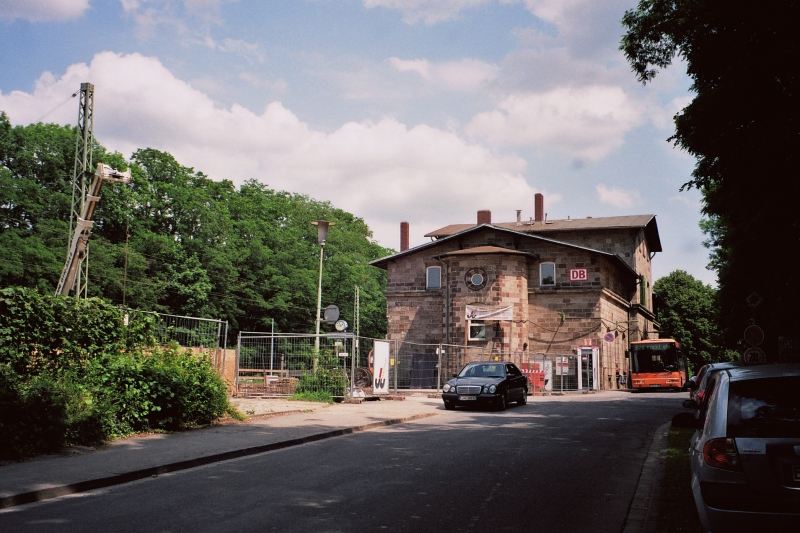
- Witzenhausen Nord railway station

- Coat of arms

- Location of Witzenhausen within Werra-Meißner-Kreis district
- Interactive map of Witzenhausen
- Location within Germany Location within Hesse
- Coordinates: 51°20′32″N 9°51′28″E
- Country: Germany
- State: Hesse
- Admin. region: Kassel
- District: Werra-Meißner-Kreis

Government
  - Mayor (2017–23): Daniel Herz (Ind.)

Area
  - Total: 126.78 km^{2} (48.95 sq mi)
- Elevation: 141 m (463 ft)

Population (2025-12-31)
  - Total: 15,110
  - Density: 119.2/km^{2} (308.7/sq mi)
- Time zone: UTC+01:00 (CET)
  - Summer (DST): UTC+02:00 (CEST)
- Postal codes: 37213–37218
- Dialling codes: 05542
- Vehicle registration: ESW, WIZ
- Website: www.witzenhausen.de

Witzenhausen (German pronunciation: [vɪtsn̩ˈhaʊzn̩]) is a small town in the Werra-Meißner-Kreis in northeastern Hesse, Germany.

It was granted town rights in 1225, and until 1974 was a district seat.

The University of Kassel maintains a satellite campus in Witzenhausen, which offers an ecological agricultural sciences programme, putting Witzenhausen among Germany's smallest university towns. There is also a teaching institute (DEULA) for environment and technology, agriculture, horticulture and landscaping. The town is nationally known for the invention of the Biotonne biological refuse container, and is an important cherry-growing area, with a yearly Kesperkirmes or “Cherry Fair” (Kesper is a regional name for the cherry), at which a Cherry Queen (Kirschenkönigin) is chosen.

== Geography ==
=== Location ===
Witzenhausen lies on the northeast slope of the Kaufunger Wald, which is surrounded by the Meißner-Kaufunger Wald Nature Park. The town is found at the mouth of the Gelster, where it empties into the Werra some 30 km east of Kassel, 16 km east-southeast of Hann. Münden, 25 km south of Göttingen and 23 km northwest of Eschwege.

=== Neighbouring communities ===
Witzenhausen borders in the north on the town of Hann. Münden, the communities of Rosdorf and Friedland (all three in Lower Saxony's Göttingen district), in the east on the communities of Neu-Eichenberg (in the Werra-Meißner-Kreis), Bornhagen and Lindewerra (both in Thuringia’s Eichsfeld district), in the south on the towns of Bad Sooden-Allendorf and Großalmerode and the unincorporated area of Gutsbezirk Kaufunger Wald (all three in the Werra-Meißner-Kreis) and in the west on the community of Staufenberg in Lower Saxony’s Göttingen district.

=== Constituent communities ===
Witzenhausen’s 16 Stadtteile, besides the main town, also called Witzenhausen, are, on the Werra’s left bank:

- Blickershausen (293 inhabitants),
- Dohrenbach (657 inhabitants),
- Ellingerode (344 inhabitants),
- Ermschwerd (1189 inhabitants),
- Hubenrode (191 inhabitants),
- Hundelshausen (1365 inhabitants),
- Kleinalmerode (925 inhabitants),
- Roßbach (825 inhabitants),
- Wendershausen (831 inhabitants)
- Ziegenhagen (716 inhabitants),

On the river’s right bank:

- Albshausen (69 inhabitants),
- Berlepsch-Ellerode-Hübenthal (132 inhabitants),
- Gertenbach (947 inhabitants),
- Neuseesen (97 inhabitants),
- Unterrieden (914 inhabitants)
- Werleshausen (503 inhabitants).

== History ==
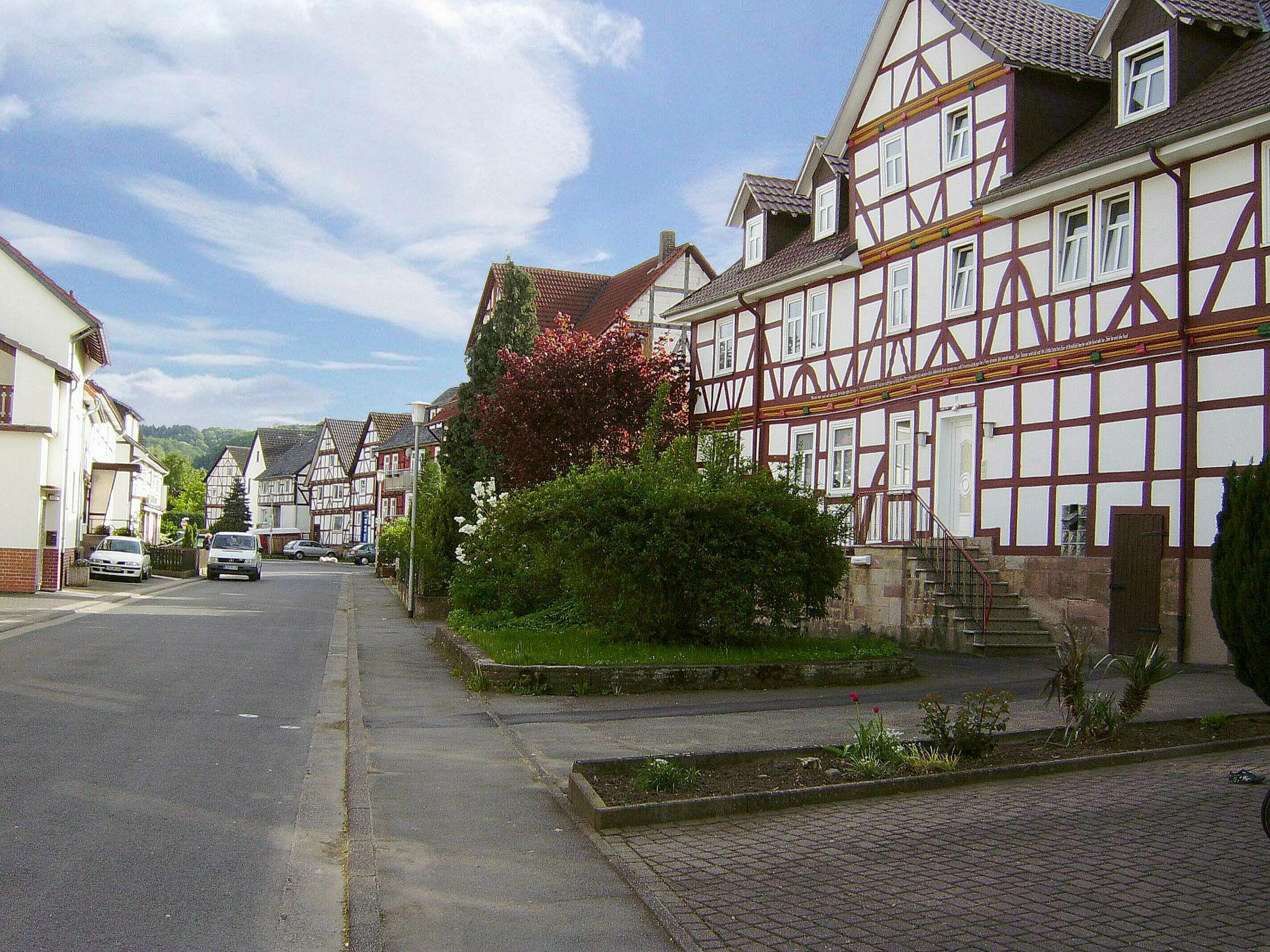
Hundelshausen

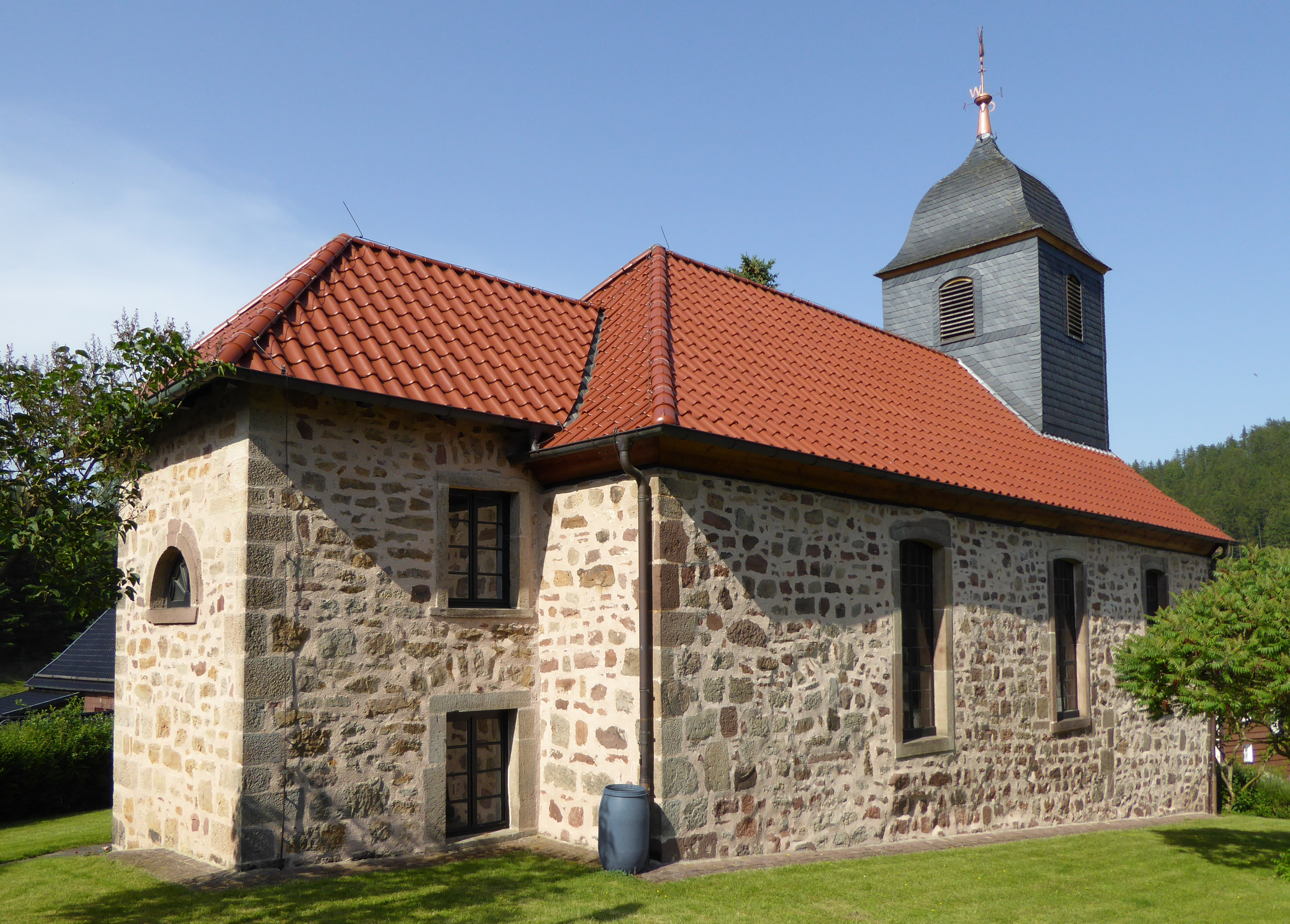
Church in Ziegenhagen

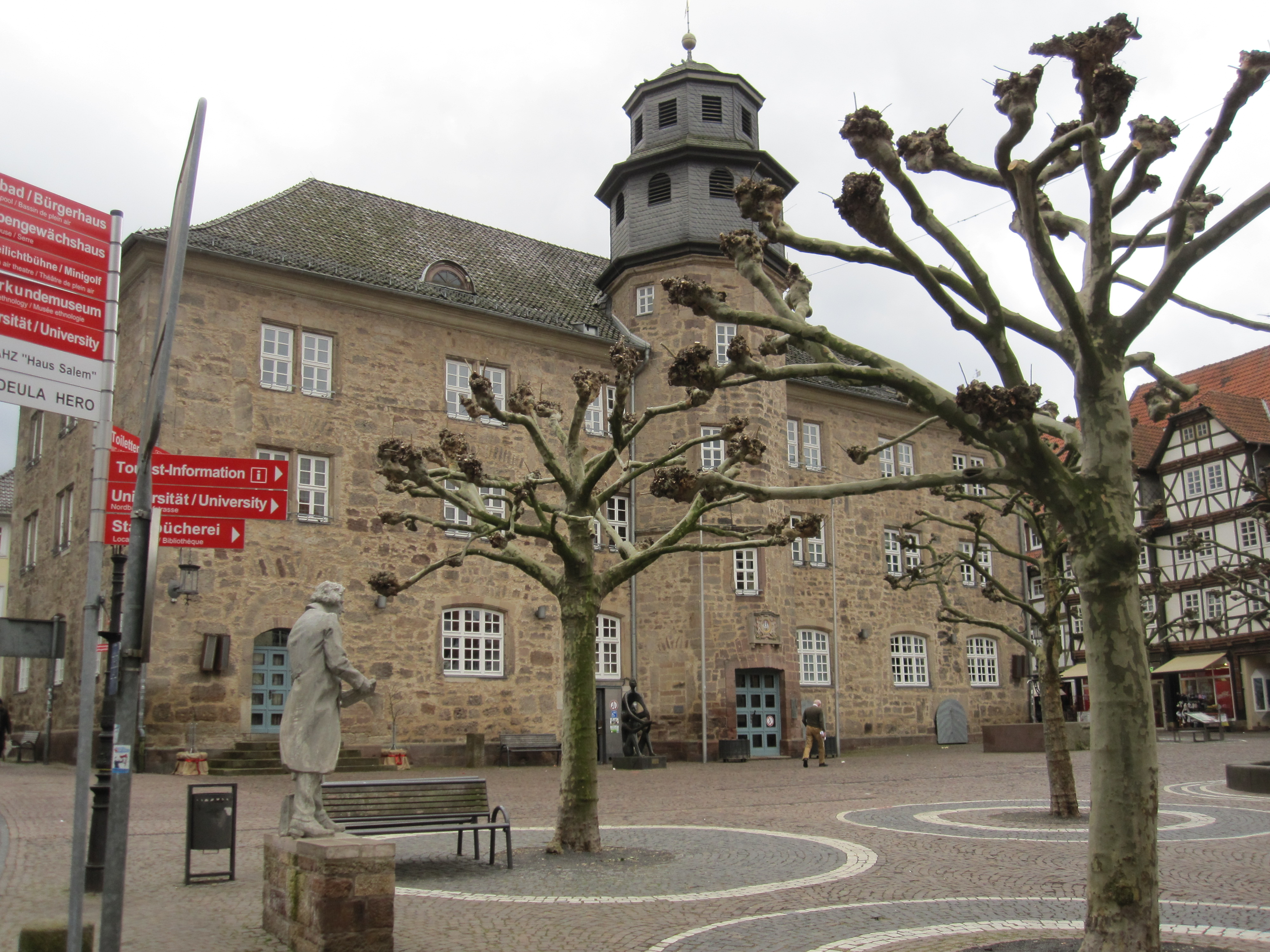
Witzenhausen Town hall

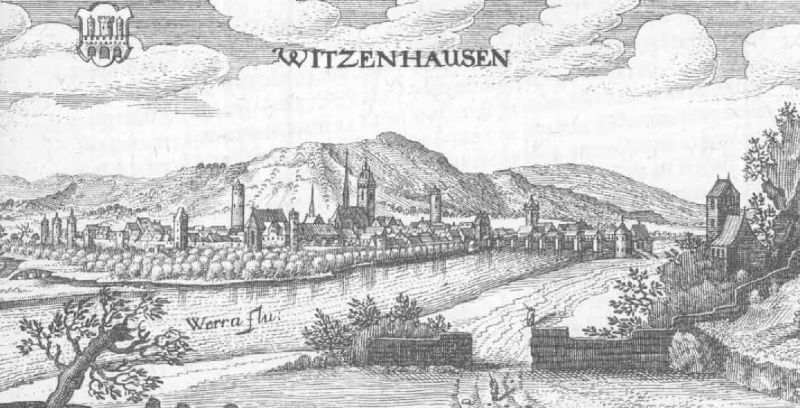
Witzenhausen – extract from the Topographia Hassiae by Matthäus Merian 1655

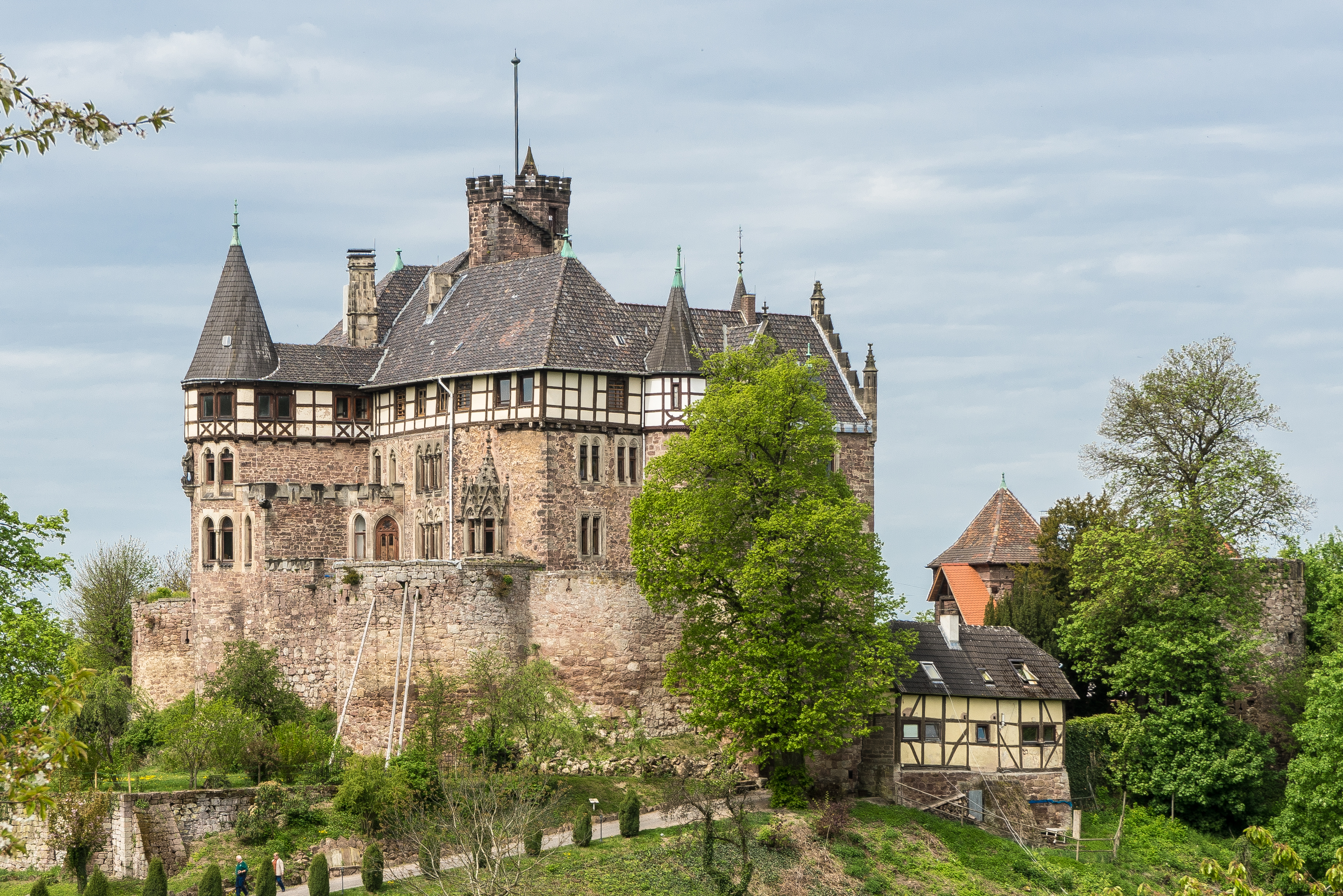
Castle Berlepsch near Witzenhausen

In 1898, the Deutsche Kolonialschule für Landwirtschaft, Handel und Gewerbe (“German Colonial School for Agriculture, Trade and Industry”, also called the Tropenschule, or “Tropical School”) was founded to train people in agriculture for resettlement in Germany's colonies. The successor institution forms today a satellite campus of the University of Kassel, and includes a greenhouse complex dedicated to tropical crops (the Gewächshaus für tropische Nutzpflanzen).

== Main sights ==
=== Buildings ===
- Historic town centre with various important timber-frame houses:
  - Grau’sches Haus
  - Rotes Haus
  - Steinernes Haus
  - Sommermann’sches Haus
  - Meinhard-Wedekind’sches Haus
  - Persch’sches Haus
- Liebfrauenkirche (church)
- Historic Town Hall
- Erlöserkirche (church)
- Diebesturm (“Thief’s Tower”), Eulenturm (“Owls’ Tower”) and parts of the old town wall
- Former Williamite monastery, part of the Colonial School and today part of the University of Kassel
- Gelsterhof Estate, the former Colonial School's farm
- Burg Ludwigstein (castle)

=== Museums ===
- Völkerkundliches Museum (ethnology)
- Greenhouse for domesticated tropical plants

=== Parks ===
- Town park with swan pond (former firefighting pond)

== Politics ==
=== Town council ===
The municipal election held on 14 March 2021 yielded the following results:

Parties and voter communities		% 2021	Seats; 2021	% 2011	Seats; 2011	% 2006	Seats; 2006
CDU	Christian Democratic Union of Germany	26.4	10	28.5	11	34.3	13
SPD	Social Democratic Party of Germany	28.2	11	40.4	15	42.1	16
GREENS	Bündnis 90/Die Grünen	18.4	7	20.2	7	11.9	4
FDP	Free Democratic Party	6.2	2	2.4	1	3.7	1
THE LEFT	Die Linke	3.7	1	3.4	1	-	-
FWG	Free Voting community	9.0	3	5.2	2	8.0	3
AFW	Alternative free Voting community	6.0	2	-	-	-	-
DIE PARTEI	The Party	2.3	1	-	-	-	-
Total		100.0	37	100.0	37	100.0	37
Voter turnout in %		56.1		54.0		53.2	

At first, the council of 2011 was ruled by a CDU-Green-FWG coalition, but this was dissolved in September 2007.

=== Mayors ===
- 1945-1948: Eduard Platner (CDU)
- 1987-2005: Günter Engel (SPD)
- 2005-2018: Angela Fischer (CDU)
- 2018- : Daniel Herz (independent)

== Events ==
- Witzenhäuser Woche, partly in conjunction with German Queens’ Day (Deutscher Königinnentag), every 3 years (in 2007 more than 200 guest queens, princesses and kings).
- Kesperkirmes, the “cherry fair” in the Old Town with election of the Cherry Queen and German cherry pip spitting championship.
- Cherry Man (Triathlon)
- Erntedank- und Heimatfest (“Harvest and Homeland Festival “), 20–25 August 2008, this year with Jürgen Drews as the star guest on Sunday in the festival tent at Joseph Pott Platz
- In 2006 Witzenhausen was the starting point for the third stage of the Deutschland Tour
- Christmas market

== Economy and infrastructure ==
Witzenhausen suffers – like the whole Werra-Meißner-Kreis and a great part of North Hesse – from extremely high unemployment and its attendant loss of younger people to migration.

In Witzenhausen-Unterrieden, the last producer of chewing tobacco in Germany is still in business. An important employer in Witzenhausen is, with 430 employees all together, the corporation Svenska Cellulosa Aktiebolaget (SCA). In Witzenhausen the SCA produces raw paper for corrugated cardboard for manufacturing packagings (SCA Packaging Containerboard) and hygiene products such as toilet paper (SCA Hygiene Products). Another important employer is the district and town hospital in Witzenhausen.

Witzenhausen is domicile of Gesellschaft zur Erhaltung alter und gefährdeter Haustierrassen (GEH, the society for the conservation of old and endangered livestock breeds).

=== Media ===
==== Print ====
- Witzenhäuser Allgemeine (Hessische/Niedersächsische Allgemeine)
- Markt Spiegel
- Witzenhüsser
- Extra Tipp

==== Wireless ====
- RundFunk Meißner

=== Transport ===
Over Bundesstraßen 27 (Göttingen–Eschwege), 80 (Hann. Münden–Heiligenstadt) and 451 (Helsa–Witzenhausen), the town is linked to the greater road network. In Hedemünden, some 10 km away, is an interchange on the Autobahn A 7 (Flensburg–Füssen). Near Friedland is an interchange on the A 38 towards Halle. Moreover, Witzenhausen is on the two tourist routes: the German Timber-Frame Road (Deutsche Fachwerkstraße) and the German Fairy Tale Route (Deutsche Märchenstraße).

Witzenhausen has a railway station, Witzenhausen Nord, on the Eichenberg–Kassel section of the Halle-Kassel Railway. It is located above the town on the north slope of the Werra valley and is served by trains to Kassel, Göttingen, Erfurt and Halle. The former Witzenhausen Süd station stood southeast of the inner town and has been closed, like the whole of the Gelster Valley Railway between Eichenberg and –Großalmerode.

The outlying centre of Gertenbach has a further stop on the Halle-Kassel railway

=== Education ===
- Grundschule Gertenbach (primary school)
- Gelstertalschule Hundelshausen (primary school)
- Grundschule Witzenhausen (primary school)
- Steintorschule (school for help with learning)
- Johannisbergschule Witzenhausen (comprehensive school)
- Berufliche Schulen des Werra-Meißner-Kreises (vocational schools)
- University of Kassel
- Medienzentrum Witzenhausen (media centre)
- Bildstelle des Werra-Meißner-Kreises (training centre)
- Deutsches Institut für tropische und subtropische Landwirtschaft GmbH (DITSL, “German Institute for Tropical and Subtropical Agriculture”)
- IBZW Internationales Bildungszentrum Witzenhausen GmbH (training centre)
- DEULA Lehranstalt für angewandte Technik GmbH
- Folk high school
- GNE Witzenhausen

== Famous people ==
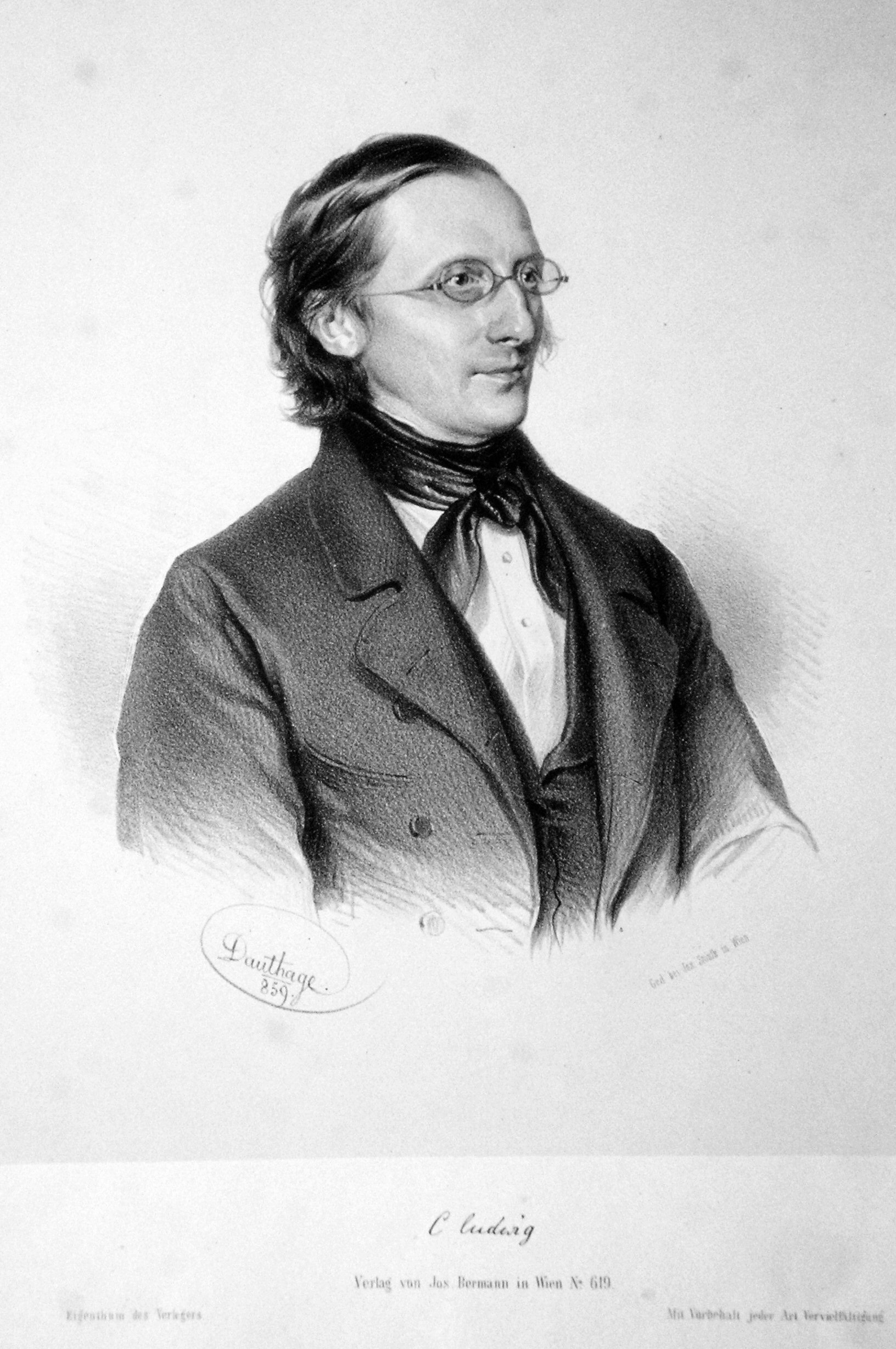
Carl Friedrich Wilhelm Ludwig in 1859

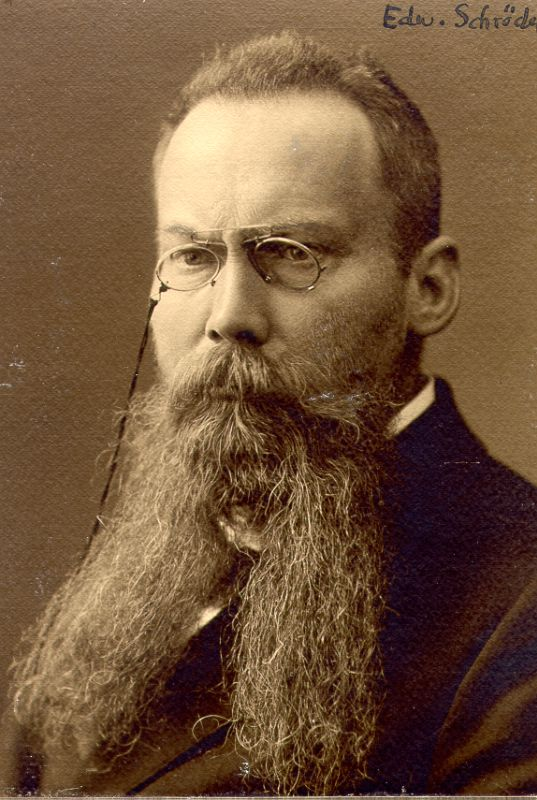
Edward Schroeder in 1906

- Johann Jacob Schweppe, (1740-1821), German watchmaker and silversmith, inventor of the trademark Schweppes
- Carl Friedrich Wilhelm Ludwig, (1816-1895), German physiologist
- Edward Schröder (1858-1942), a Germanist mediavist
- Theodor Neubauer (1890-1945), German sociologist, educator, parliamentarian and Resistance fighter against National Socialism
- Heinz Bonatz (1897-1981), German naval officer
- Helga Seibert, (1939-1999), German constitutional judge
- Bodo Abel (born 1948), economist
- Stefan Markolf (born 1984), first deaf German professional footballer for, among others, 1. FSV Mainz 05, Wuppertaler SV Borussia
- Diether Haenicke, President of Western Michigan University
- Ferdinand Manns (1844-1922), composer and conductor

== Town partnerships ==
Witzenhausen is twinned with:

- Saint-Vallier, France, since 1975
- Vignola, Italy, since 1995
- Filton, England, since 1978
- Kayunga, Uganda, since 2001

Since 1979, Filton, St. Vallier and Witzenhausen have had a three-way partnership.

Between Witzenhausen and Filton, and between Witzenhausen and St. Vallier, there are regular student exchanges with the local comprehensive school. The partnership between Witzenhausen and St. Vallier came about by accident. St. Vallier's mayor's last name at the time was Witzenhausen, and when, on a visit to Germany, he spotted this name on a road sign, he drove to the town. Out of his visit sprang the partnership, which has lasted to this day.

Furthermore, there have been school exchanges between Witzenhausen and these two places since 2002:

- 100 Mile House, Canada (between the comprehensive school and the secondary school there)
- (United States) Turlock, USA (between the vocational Gymnasium and Turlock High School)
