= Freienhagen =

Freienhagen may refer to the following places in Germany:

- Freienhagen, Thuringia, in the Eichsfeld district, Thuringia
- A locality in the city of Liebenwalde, in the Oberhavel district, Brandenburg
- Freienhagen (Fuldabrück), part of Fuldabrück, in the Kassel district, Hesse
- Freienhagen (Waldeck), part of Waldeck, in Waldeck-Frankenberg district, Hesse
