= Manns =

Notable people with the surname Manns

Notable people with the surname Manns include:

- August Manns (1825–1907), German conductor, working in England
- Christopher Manns (born 1980), American ice sledge hockey player
- Denvis Manns (born 1976), American football running back
- Ferdinand Manns (1844–1922), German composer, conductor, music director
- Frédéric Manns (1942–2021), French biblical scholar
- Janel Manns (born 1966), Australia wheelchair tennis player
- Jesper Manns (born 1995), Swedish football defender
- Jonathan Manns, British town planner, living in New Zealand
- Linda Kay Manns (1965–2008), first Miss Alaska Teen USA and politician
- Patricio Manns (1937–2021), Chilean singer, writer, social activist
- Paul Manns (born 1961), English midfield footballer
- Paul W. Manns (1910–1978), American newspaperman and politician in Virginia
- Tom Manns (1911–unknown), English full-back footballer

== See also ==
- Manns, maker of Manns Original Brown Ale
- Mann (surname)
