= Fretterode =

- Municipality
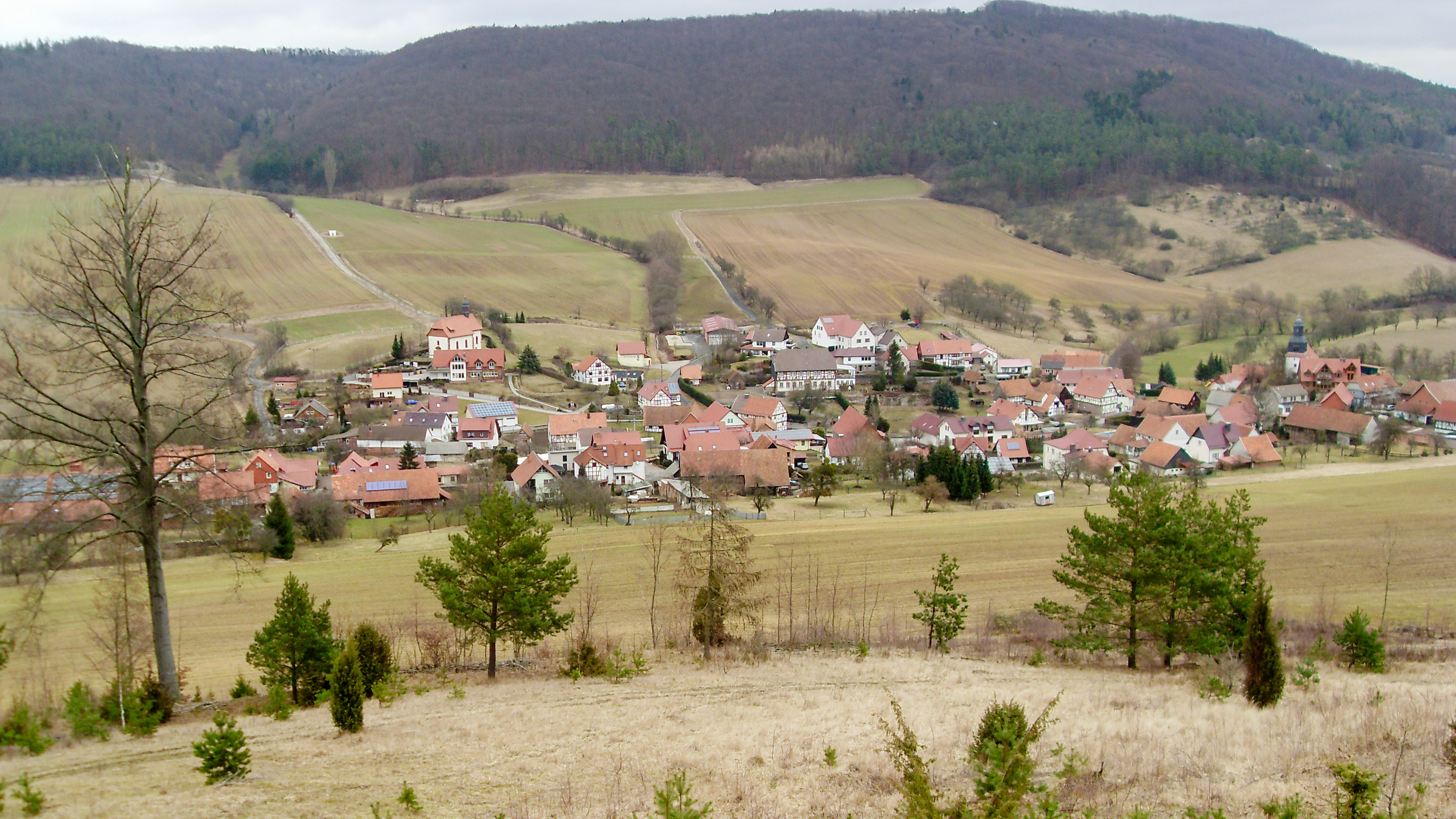

- Location of Fretterode within Eichsfeld district
- Interactive map of Fretterode
- Location within Germany Location within Thuringia
- Coordinates: 51°19′9″N 10°0′29″E
- Country: Germany
- State: Thuringia
- District: Eichsfeld
- Municipal assoc.: Hanstein-Rusteberg

Government
  - Mayor (2024–30): Mike Gunkel

Area
  - Total: 5.87 km^{2} (2.27 sq mi)
- Elevation: 285 m (935 ft)

Population (2025-12-31)
  - Total: 173
  - Density: 29.5/km^{2} (76.3/sq mi)
- Time zone: UTC+01:00 (CET)
  - Summer (DST): UTC+02:00 (CEST)
- Postal codes: 37318
- Dialling codes: 036087
- Vehicle registration: EIC
- Website: www.vg-hanstein-rusteberg.de

Fretterode is a municipality in the district of Eichsfeld in Thuringia, Germany. It is part of the Verwaltungsgemeinschaft Hanstein-Rusteberg.
