= Hundeshagen =

- Ortsteil of Leinefelde-Worbis
- Coat of arms
- Interactive map of Hundeshagen
- Location within Germany Location within Thuringia
- Coordinates: 51°26′5″N 10°16′44″E
- Country: Germany
- State: Thuringia
- District: Eichsfeld
- Town: Leinefelde-Worbis

Area
  - Total: 13.38 km^{2} (5.17 sq mi)
- Elevation: 271 m (889 ft)

Population (2016-12-31)
  - Total: 1,155
  - Density: 86.32/km^{2} (223.6/sq mi)
- Time zone: UTC+01:00 (CET)
  - Summer (DST): UTC+02:00 (CEST)
- Postal codes: 37339
- Dialling codes: 036071
- Vehicle registration: EIC
- Website: www.lindenberg-eichsfeld.de

Hundeshagen (German pronunciation: [hʊndəsˈhaːɡn̩]) is a village and a former municipality in the district of Eichsfeld in Thuringia, Germany. Since July 2018, it is part of the town Leinefelde-Worbis.

== History ==
Hundeshagen was first mentioned in documents on the 15th of April 1282, when the lords of Westernhagen received patronage over its church. In 1312, the earls of Lutterberg transferred their properties in Hundeshagen to the lords of Westernhagen as well. About 1.5 kilometers to the west of the village, castle Westernhagen was situated on a small elevation that was surrounded by an artificial watercourse. There are no traces left of castle Osterhagen, but it was located on a verifiable elevation close to the village. The noble family Hagen is a noted lineage that was resident in many villages of this region. The castles were destroyed by peasants in 1552, but were mentioned once more in 1557.

Around 1700, about 1.5 kilometers below the historical town center (located in the street Kiel today), a colony called the Freiheit (German for "freedom") arose close to the former castle Osternhagen. Here, landless people were given property to build residences in exchange for a protection fee by the landlords of Westernhagen. The residents of the Freiheit did not own farmland, but they were also exempt from the usual taxes and burdens put on the farmers in the village Hundeshagen. In the middle of the 18th century, the Freiheit encompassed 31 houses, though this number went down again in the following decades. Most of its residents earned their living as artisanal workers, such as wool combers, tinkers or broom binders, and later as traveling musicians. From the end of the 18th, the area between the Altdorf (old town) and the Freiheit was populated, which is now called Mitteldorf (middle town) and contains the new church and former school.

=== Population development ===
Development of the population (as of December 31):

| Year | Population | Year | Population | Year | Population |
|---|---|---|---|---|---|
| 1994 | 1283 | 2002 | 1304 | 2010 | 1238 |
| 1995 | 1306 | 2003 | 1311 | 2011 | 1245 |
| 1996 | 1312 | 2004 | 1286 | 2012 | 1201 |
| 1997 | 1311 | 2005 | 1286 | 2013 | 1195 |
| 1998 | 1270 | 2006 | 1255 | 2014 | 1173 |
| 1999 | 1301 | 2007 | 1273 | 2015 | 1157 |
| 2000 | 1318 | 2008 | 1247 | 2016 | 1155 |
| 2001 | 1335 | 2009 | 1264 | 2017 | 1160 |

Data source: Thuringian State Office for Statistics

== Language ==
Traditionally, the people of Hundeshagen, just as the rest of the Northern Eichsfeld region, have spoken Eichsfeld Platt. However, the village is located right at the language border to Thuringian, which is spoken in the neighboring villages to the South. Additionally, there used to be a local special language called Kochum. Nowadays, these languages have mostly been pushed out by High German.

The language Kochum is a peculiarity of Hundeshagen. It points to the residents' background in the migrating population ("Kochemer", German for "skilled crook") of the early modern times. It is considered a Yenish dialect and contains elements of Yiddish and the Romani language. Its vocabulary is dominated by the topic of music, due to the fact that the language was primarily used by the traveling musicians of the village to communicate amongst each other. The name "Klingerdilms" refers to a music club in Hundeshagen whose name originates in Kochum ("klinger" - musicians, "dilms" - girls). There are many references to the former traveling music tradition in the village.

== Sights ==
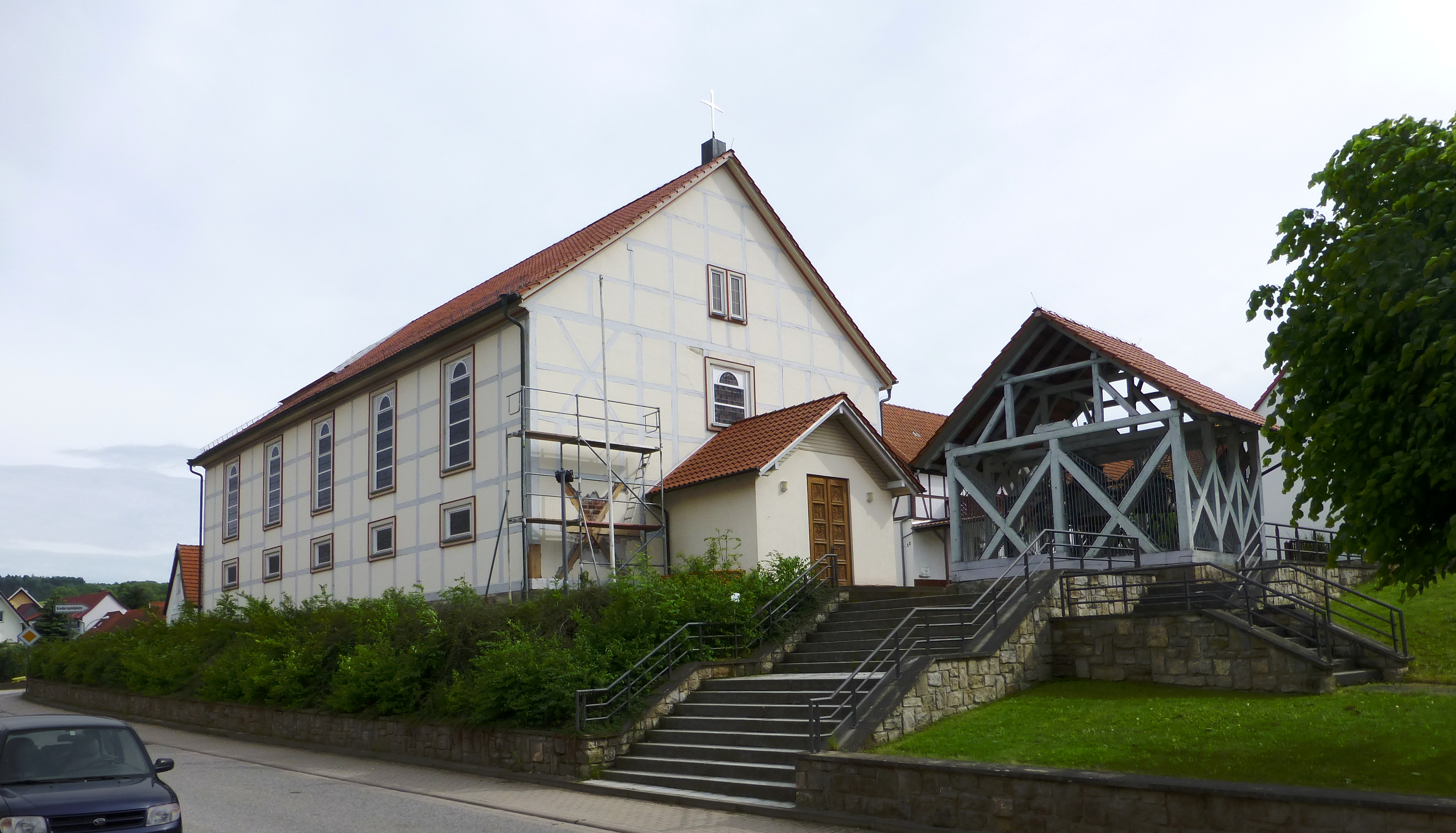
Church St. Dionysius with its bell tower

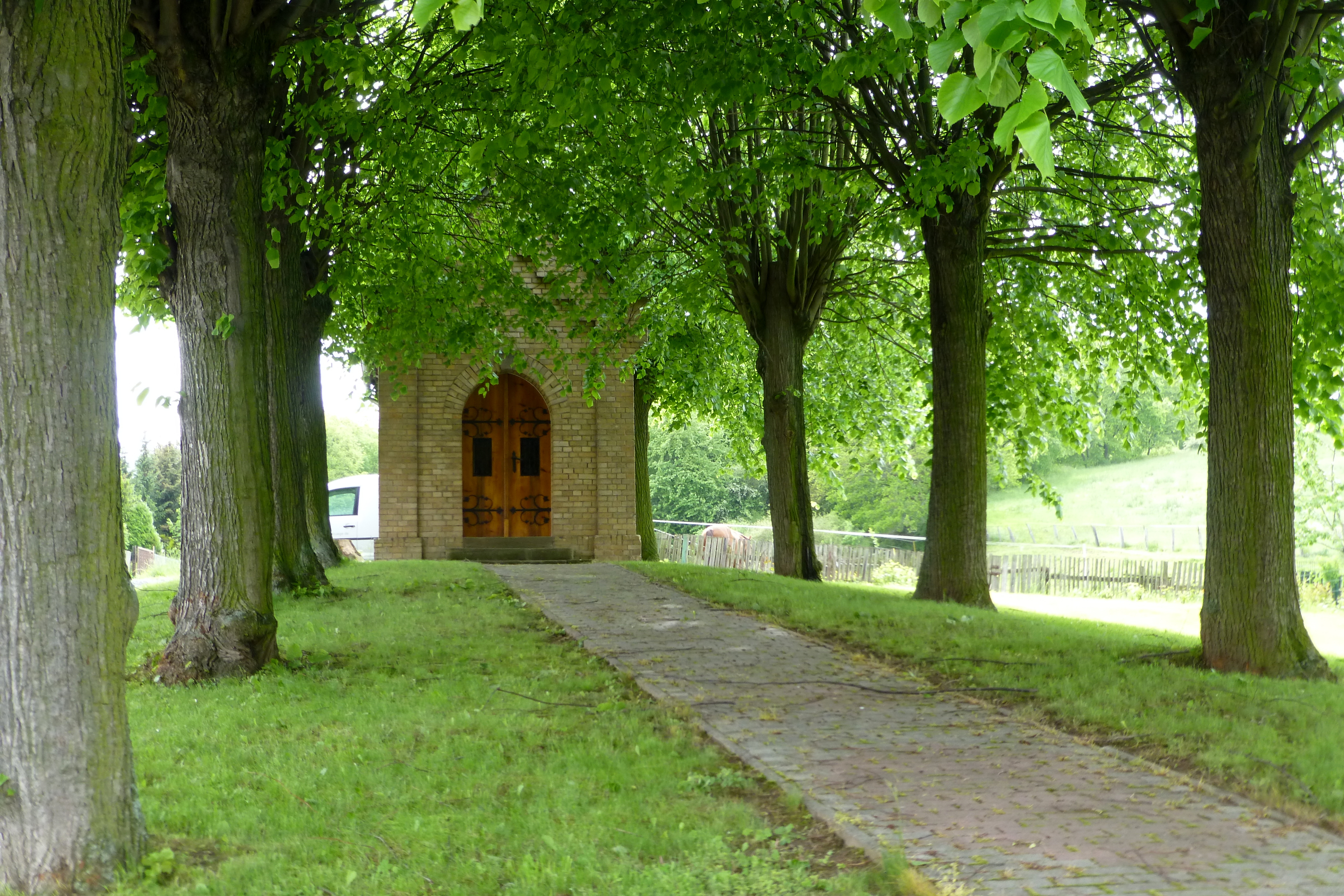
Chapel "Klüschen" in Hundeshagen

- church St. Dionysius with its bell house, designed in 1843 by Friedrich August Stüler
- Klüschen — a small chapel in Hundeshagen
- Bildstock — a small shrine outside Hundeshagen, showing Maria with the crucified Jesus
- Local history museum
- Etzelsbach pilgrimage chapel, visited by Pope Benedict XVI in 2011
