= Wachstedt =

- Municipality
- Coat of arms

- Location of Wachstedt within Eichsfeld district
- Interactive map of Wachstedt
- Location within Germany Location within Thuringia
- Coordinates: 51°17′35″N 10°14′52″E
- Country: Germany
- State: Thuringia
- District: Eichsfeld
- Municipal assoc.: Westerwald-Obereichsfeld

Government
  - Mayor (2022–28): Leander Lins

Area
  - Total: 17.46 km^{2} (6.74 sq mi)
- Elevation: 475 m (1,558 ft)

Population (2025-12-31)
  - Total: 443
  - Density: 25.4/km^{2} (65.7/sq mi)
- Time zone: UTC+01:00 (CET)
  - Summer (DST): UTC+02:00 (CEST)
- Postal codes: 37359
- Dialling codes: 036075
- Vehicle registration: EIC
- Website: www.westerwald-obereichsfeld.de

Wachstedt is a municipality in the district of Eichsfeld in Thuringia, Germany.
