= Wahlhausen =

- Municipality
- Coat of arms

- Location of Wahlhausen within Eichsfeld district
- Interactive map of Wahlhausen
- Location within Germany Location within Thuringia
- Coordinates: 51°17′40″N 9°58′40″E
- Country: Germany
- State: Thuringia
- District: Eichsfeld
- Municipal assoc.: Hanstein-Rusteberg

Government
  - Mayor (2022–28): Steffen Großheim

Area
  - Total: 7.14 km^{2} (2.76 sq mi)
- Elevation: 150 m (490 ft)

Population (2025-12-31)
  - Total: 290
  - Density: 41/km^{2} (110/sq mi)
- Time zone: UTC+01:00 (CET)
  - Summer (DST): UTC+02:00 (CEST)
- Postal codes: 37318
- Dialling codes: 036087
- Vehicle registration: EIC
- Website: www.wahlhausen.de

Wahlhausen (German pronunciation: [vaːlˈhaʊzn̩]) is a municipality in the district of Eichsfeld in Thuringia, Germany. It is part of the Verwaltungsgemeinschaft Hanstein-Rusteberg.
