= Hanstein-Rusteberg =

- Verwaltungsgemeinschaft
- Map of Eichsfeld highlighting Hanstein-Rusteberg
- Interactive map of Hanstein-Rusteberg
- Location within Germany Location within Thuringia
- Coordinates: 51°22′N 9°57′E
- Country: Germany
- State: Thuringia
- District: Eichsfeld
- Seat: Hohengandern
- Subdivisions: 14 municipalities

Area
  - Total: 76.18 km^{2} (29.41 sq mi)

Population (2025-12-31)
  - Total: 5,557
  - Density: 72.95/km^{2} (188.9/sq mi)
- Time zone: UTC+01:00 (CET)
  - Summer (DST): UTC+02:00 (CEST)
- Website: www.vg-hanstein-rusteberg.de

Hanstein-Rusteberg is a Verwaltungsgemeinschaft ("collective municipality") in the district Eichsfeld, in Thuringia, Germany. The seat of the Verwaltungsgemeinschaft is in Hohengandern. Hanstein Castle is in Hanstein-Rusteberg.

The Verwaltungsgemeinschaft Hanstein-Rusteberg consists of the following municipalities:

1. Arenshausen
2. Bornhagen
3. Burgwalde
4. Freienhagen
5. Fretterode
6. Gerbershausen
7. Hohengandern
8. Kirchgandern
9. Lindewerra
10. Marth
11. Rohrberg
12. Rustenfelde
13. Schachtebich
14. Wahlhausen
