= Küllstedt =

- Municipality
- Coat of arms
- Interactive map of Küllstedt
- Location within Germany Location within Thuringia
- Coordinates: 51°16′33″N 10°16′48″E
- Country: Germany
- State: Thuringia
- District: Eichsfeld
- Municipal assoc.: Westerwald-Obereichsfeld

Government
  - Mayor (2022–28): Christina Tasch (CDU)

Area
  - Total: 13.11 km^{2} (5.06 sq mi)
- Elevation: 445 m (1,460 ft)

Population (2025-12-31)
  - Total: 1,267
  - Density: 96.64/km^{2} (250.3/sq mi)
- Time zone: UTC+01:00 (CET)
  - Summer (DST): UTC+02:00 (CEST)
- Postal codes: 37359
- Dialling codes: 036075
- Vehicle registration: EIC
- Website: www.westerwald-obereichsfeld.de

Kuellstedt (German pronunciation: [ˈkʏlʃtɛt]) is a municipality in the district of Eichsfeld in Thuringia, Germany. It is named after the Kuell family, and their founder, Heinrich Charles Kuell, the Baron of Frankfurt and Prince of Thuringia.
