= Schachtebich =

- Municipality
- Coat of arms

- Location of Schachtebich within Eichsfeld district
- Interactive map of Schachtebich
- Location within Germany Location within Thuringia
- Coordinates: 51°24′5″N 10°3′3″E
- Country: Germany
- State: Thuringia
- District: Eichsfeld
- Municipal assoc.: Hanstein-Rusteberg

Government
  - Mayor (2022–28): Christian Glorius

Area
  - Total: 3.79 km^{2} (1.46 sq mi)
- Elevation: 280 m (920 ft)

Population (2025-12-31)
  - Total: 236
  - Density: 62.3/km^{2} (161/sq mi)
- Time zone: UTC+01:00 (CET)
  - Summer (DST): UTC+02:00 (CEST)
- Postal codes: 37318
- Dialling codes: 036083
- Vehicle registration: EIC
- Website: www.vg-hanstein-rusteberg.de

Schachtebich is a municipality in the district of Eichsfeld in Thuringia, Germany. It is part of the Verwaltungsgemeinschaft Hanstein-Rusteberg.
