= Burgwalde =

- Municipality
- Coat of arms

- Location of Burgwalde within Eichsfeld district
- Interactive map of Burgwalde
- Location within Germany Location within Thuringia
- Coordinates: 51°23′19″N 10°2′40″E
- Country: Germany
- State: Thuringia
- District: Eichsfeld
- Municipal assoc.: Hanstein-Rusteberg

Government
  - Mayor (2019–25): Rainer Lott

Area
  - Total: 4.96 km^{2} (1.92 sq mi)
- Elevation: 255 m (837 ft)

Population (2025-12-31)
  - Total: 230
  - Density: 46/km^{2} (120/sq mi)
- Time zone: UTC+01:00 (CET)
  - Summer (DST): UTC+02:00 (CEST)
- Postal codes: 37318
- Dialling codes: 036083
- Vehicle registration: EIC
- Website: www.vg-hanstein-rusteberg.de

Burgwalde (German pronunciation: [bʊʁkˈvaldə]) is a municipality in the district of Eichsfeld in Thuringia, Germany, part of the Verwaltungsgemeinschaft Hanstein-Rusteberg.
