= Rustenfelde =

- Municipality
- Coat of arms

- Location of Rustenfelde within Eichsfeld district
- Interactive map of Rustenfelde
- Location within Germany Location within Thuringia
- Coordinates: 51°23′35″N 10°0′15″E
- Country: Germany
- State: Thuringia
- District: Eichsfeld
- Municipal assoc.: Hanstein-Rusteberg

Government
  - Mayor (2022–28): Ulrich Hesse

Area
  - Total: 6.13 km^{2} (2.37 sq mi)
- Elevation: 240 m (790 ft)

Population (2025-12-31)
  - Total: 524
  - Density: 85.5/km^{2} (221/sq mi)
- Time zone: UTC+01:00 (CET)
  - Summer (DST): UTC+02:00 (CEST)
- Postal codes: 37318
- Dialling codes: 036081
- Vehicle registration: EIC
- Website: www.vg-hanstein-rusteberg.de

Rustenfelde is a municipality in the district of Eichsfeld in Thuringia, Germany. It is part of the Verwaltungsgemeinschaft Hanstein-Rusteberg.
