= Westerwald-Obereichsfeld =

- Verwaltungsgemeinschaft
- Map of Eichsfeld highlighting Westerwald-Obereichsfeld
- Interactive map of Westerwald-Obereichsfeld
- Location within Germany Location within Thuringia
- Coordinates: 51°17′N 10°17′E
- Country: Germany
- State: Thuringia
- District: Eichsfeld
- Seat: Küllstedt
- Subdivisions: 5 municipalities

Area
  - Total: 62.8 km^{2} (24.2 sq mi)

Population (2025-12-31)
  - Total: 4,649
  - Density: 74.0/km^{2} (192/sq mi)
- Time zone: UTC+01:00 (CET)
  - Summer (DST): UTC+02:00 (CEST)
- Website: www.westerwald-obereichsfeld.de

Westerwald-Obereichsfeld is a Verwaltungsgemeinschaft ("collective municipality") in the district Eichsfeld, in Thuringia, Germany. The seat of the Verwaltungsgemeinschaft is in Küllstedt.

The Verwaltungsgemeinschaft Westerwald-Obereichsfeld consists of the following municipalities:

1. Büttstedt
2. Effelder
3. Großbartloff
4. Küllstedt
5. Wachstedt
