= Arenshausen =

- Municipality
- Coat of arms

- Location of Arenshausen within Eichsfeld district
- Interactive map of Arenshausen
- Location within Germany Location within Thuringia
- Coordinates: 51°22′36″N 9°58′18″E
- Country: Germany
- State: Thuringia
- District: Eichsfeld
- Municipal assoc.: Hanstein-Rusteberg

Government
  - Mayor (2019–25): Matthias Geyer

Area
  - Total: 5.79 km^{2} (2.24 sq mi)
- Elevation: 202 m (663 ft)

Population (2025-12-31)
  - Total: 1,025
  - Density: 177/km^{2} (459/sq mi)
- Time zone: UTC+01:00 (CET)
  - Summer (DST): UTC+02:00 (CEST)
- Postal codes: 37318
- Dialling codes: 036081
- Vehicle registration: EIC
- Website: www.vg-hanstein-rusteberg.de

Arenshausen is a village in the Eichsfeld district of Thuringia, Germany.
