= Brehme, Germany =

Brehme
- Municipality
- Coat of arms

- Location of Brehme within Eichsfeld district
- Interactive map of Brehme
- Location within Germany Location within Thuringia
- Coordinates: 51°29′34″N 10°21′37″E
- Country: Germany
- State: Thuringia
- District: Eichsfeld
- Municipal assoc.: Lindenberg/Eichsfeld

Government
  - Mayor (2022–28): Patrick Schotte

Area
  - Total: 5.28 km^{2} (2.04 sq mi)
- Elevation: 270 m (890 ft)

Population (2025-12-31)
  - Total: 1,078
  - Density: 204/km^{2} (529/sq mi)
- Time zone: UTC+01:00 (CET)
  - Summer (DST): UTC+02:00 (CEST)
- Postal codes: 37339
- Dialling codes: 036071
- Vehicle registration: EIC
- Website: www.lindenberg-eichsfeld.de

Brehme is a municipality in the district of Eichsfeld in Thuringia, Germany.
