= Großbartloff =

- Municipality
- Coat of arms

- Location of Großbartloff within Eichsfeld district
- Interactive map of Großbartloff
- Location within Germany Location within Thuringia
- Coordinates: 51°15′1″N 10°12′41″E
- Country: Germany
- State: Thuringia
- District: Eichsfeld
- Municipal assoc.: Westerwald-Obereichsfeld

Government
  - Mayor (2022–28): Winfried König (CDU)

Area
  - Total: 13.70 km^{2} (5.29 sq mi)
- Elevation: 280 m (920 ft)

Population (2025-12-31)
  - Total: 890
  - Density: 65/km^{2} (170/sq mi)
- Time zone: UTC+01:00 (CET)
  - Summer (DST): UTC+02:00 (CEST)
- Postal codes: 37359
- Dialling codes: 036027
- Vehicle registration: EIC
- Website: www.grossbartloff.de

Großbartloff is a municipality in the district of Eichsfeld in Thuringia, Germany.
