= Kirchgandern =

- Municipality
- Coat of arms

- Location of Kirchgandern within Eichsfeld district
- Interactive map of Kirchgandern
- Location within Germany Location within Thuringia
- Coordinates: 51°23′5″N 9°57′43″E
- Country: Germany
- State: Thuringia
- District: Eichsfeld
- Municipal assoc.: Hanstein-Rusteberg

Government
  - Mayor (2018–24): Frank Warndt (CDU)

Area
  - Total: 4.37 km^{2} (1.69 sq mi)
- Elevation: 205 m (673 ft)

Population (2025-12-31)
  - Total: 596
  - Density: 136/km^{2} (353/sq mi)
- Time zone: UTC+01:00 (CET)
  - Summer (DST): UTC+02:00 (CEST)
- Postal codes: 37318
- Dialling codes: 036081
- Vehicle registration: EIC
- Website: www.kirchgandern.de

Kirchgandern is a municipality in the district of Eichsfeld in Thuringia, Germany. It is part of the Verwaltungsgemeinschaft Hanstein-Rusteberg. Kirchgandern was first mentioned in documentary in 1118.
