= Marth, Thuringia =

- Municipality
- Coat of arms

- Location of Marth, Thuringia within Eichsfeld district
- Interactive map of Marth, Thuringia
- Location within Germany Location within Thuringia
- Coordinates: 51°22′58″N 10°0′17″E
- Country: Germany
- State: Thuringia
- District: Eichsfeld
- Municipal assoc.: Hanstein-Rusteberg

Government
  - Mayor (2024–30): Peter Dreiling

Area
  - Total: 4.85 km^{2} (1.87 sq mi)
- Elevation: 280 m (920 ft)

Population (2025-12-31)
  - Total: 317
  - Density: 65.4/km^{2} (169/sq mi)
- Time zone: UTC+01:00 (CET)
  - Summer (DST): UTC+02:00 (CEST)
- Postal codes: 37318
- Dialling codes: 036081
- Vehicle registration: EIC
- Website: www.vg-hanstein-rusteberg.de

Marth (pronunciation: MAHRT) is a Thuringian municipality in the district of Eichsfeld in Germany, in the Verwaltungsgemeinschaft Haustein-Rusteberg.
