= Reinholterode =

- Municipality
- Coat of arms

- Location of Reinholterode within Eichsfeld district
- Interactive map of Reinholterode
- Location within Germany Location within Thuringia
- Coordinates: 51°25′28″N 10°11′39″E
- Country: Germany
- State: Thuringia
- District: Eichsfeld
- Municipal assoc.: Leinetal

Government
  - Mayor (2022–28): Peter Senft

Area
  - Total: 8.73 km^{2} (3.37 sq mi)
- Elevation: 325 m (1,066 ft)

Population (2025-12-31)
  - Total: 758
  - Density: 86.8/km^{2} (225/sq mi)
- Time zone: UTC+01:00 (CET)
  - Summer (DST): UTC+02:00 (CEST)
- Postal codes: 37308
- Dialling codes: 036085
- Vehicle registration: EIC

Reinholterode is a municipality in the district of Eichsfeld, Thuringia, Germany.
