= Effelder, Eichsfeld =

Effelder
- Municipality
- Coat of arms

- Location of Effelder within Eichsfeld district
- Interactive map of Effelder
- Location within Germany Location within Thuringia
- Coordinates: 51°14′21″N 10°14′48″E
- Country: Germany
- State: Thuringia
- District: Eichsfeld
- Municipal assoc.: Westerwald-Obereichsfeld

Government
  - Mayor (2022–28): Hans-Werner Lange

Area
  - Total: 10.94 km^{2} (4.22 sq mi)
- Elevation: 470 m (1,540 ft)

Population (2025-12-31)
  - Total: 1,193
  - Density: 109.0/km^{2} (282.4/sq mi)
- Time zone: UTC+01:00 (CET)
  - Summer (DST): UTC+02:00 (CEST)
- Postal codes: 37359
- Dialling codes: 036075
- Vehicle registration: EIC
- Website: www.westerwald-obereichsfeld.de

Effelder (German pronunciation: [ˈɛfɛldɐ]) is a municipality in the district of Eichsfeld in Thuringia, Germany. It is located in the center of the country.
