= Schimberg =

- Municipality
- Location of Schimberg within Eichsfeld district
- Interactive map of Schimberg
- Location within Germany Location within Thuringia
- Coordinates: 51°15′21″N 10°9′46″E
- Country: Germany
- State: Thuringia
- District: Eichsfeld
- Municipal assoc.: Ershausen/Geismar
- Subdivisions: 4

Government
  - Mayor (2022–28): Doreen Mathias-Fromm

Area
  - Total: 29.33 km^{2} (11.32 sq mi)
- Elevation: 225 m (738 ft)

Population (2025-12-31)
  - Total: 2,140
  - Density: 73.0/km^{2} (189/sq mi)
- Time zone: UTC+01:00 (CET)
  - Summer (DST): UTC+02:00 (CEST)
- Postal codes: 37308
- Dialling codes: 036082
- Vehicle registration: EIC
- Website: www.schimberg-online.de

Schimberg is a municipality in the district of Eichsfeld in Thuringia, Germany.

== Personalities ==
- Josef Rodenstock (1846–1932), optician and founder of the optical works named after him
