= Kella, Thuringia =

- Municipality
- Coat of arms

- Location of Kella, Thuringia within Eichsfeld district
- Interactive map of Kella, Thuringia
- Location within Germany Location within Thuringia
- Coordinates: 51°13′45″N 10°4′45″E
- Country: Germany
- State: Thuringia
- District: Eichsfeld
- Municipal assoc.: Ershausen/Geismar

Government
  - Mayor (2022–28): Silvio Schneider (CDU)

Area
  - Total: 5.06 km^{2} (1.95 sq mi)
- Elevation: 330 m (1,080 ft)

Population (2025-12-31)
  - Total: 481
  - Density: 95.1/km^{2} (246/sq mi)
- Time zone: UTC+01:00 (CET)
  - Summer (DST): UTC+02:00 (CEST)
- Postal codes: 37308
- Dialling codes: 036082
- Vehicle registration: EIC
- Website: www.ershausen-geismar.de

Kella (German pronunciation: [ˈkɛla]) is a municipality in the district of Eichsfeld in Thuringia, Germany.
