= Hohengandern =

- Municipality
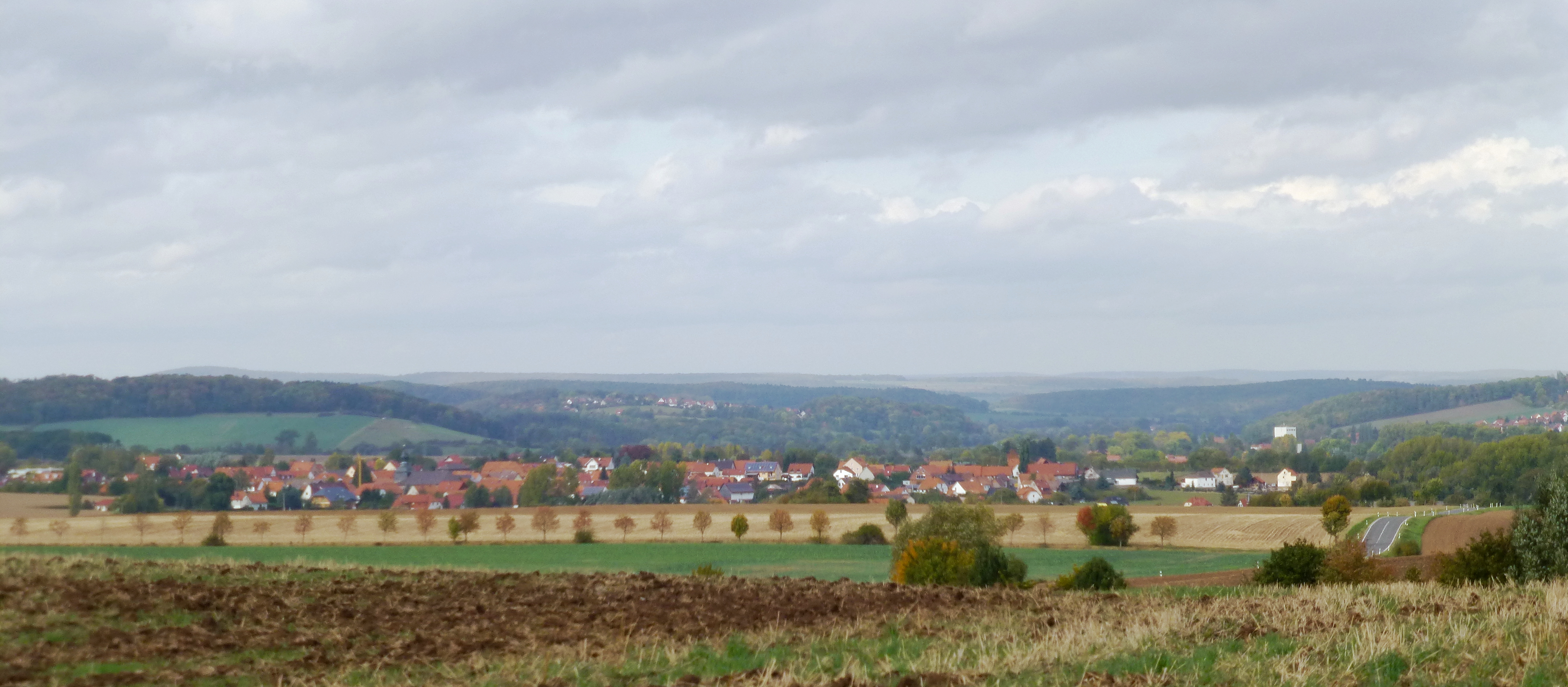

- Location of Hohengandern within Eichsfeld district
- Interactive map of Hohengandern
- Location within Germany Location within Thuringia
- Coordinates: 51°22′26″N 9°56′46″E
- Country: Germany
- State: Thuringia
- District: Eichsfeld
- Municipal assoc.: Hanstein-Rusteberg

Government
  - Mayor (2024–30): Michael Trümper

Area
  - Total: 6.83 km^{2} (2.64 sq mi)
- Elevation: 218 m (715 ft)

Population (2025-12-31)
  - Total: 563
  - Density: 82.4/km^{2} (213/sq mi)
- Time zone: UTC+01:00 (CET)
  - Summer (DST): UTC+02:00 (CEST)
- Postal codes: 37318
- Dialling codes: 036081
- Vehicle registration: EIC
- Website: www.vg-hanstein-rusteberg.de

Hohengandern is a municipality in the district of Eichsfeld in Thuringia, Germany. It is part of the Verwaltungsgemeinschaft Hanstein-Rusteberg.
