= Rohrberg, Thuringia =

Rohrberg
- Municipality
- Coat of arms

- Location of Rohrberg within Eichsfeld district
- Interactive map of Rohrberg
- Location within Germany Location within Thuringia
- Coordinates: 51°24′36″N 10°1′19″E
- Country: Germany
- State: Thuringia
- District: Eichsfeld
- Municipal assoc.: Hanstein-Rusteberg

Government
  - Mayor (2022–28): Markus Kulle (CDU)

Area
  - Total: 3.54 km^{2} (1.37 sq mi)
- Elevation: 315 m (1,033 ft)

Population (2025-12-31)
  - Total: 230
  - Density: 65/km^{2} (170/sq mi)
- Time zone: UTC+01:00 (CET)
  - Summer (DST): UTC+02:00 (CEST)
- Postal codes: 37318
- Dialling codes: 036083
- Vehicle registration: EIC
- Website: www.rohrberg-eichsfeld.de

Rohrberg is a municipality in the Eichsfeld, in the Verwaltungsgemeinschaft Hanstein-Rusteberg, in Thuringia, Germany.

The first known mention of the community was in 1055. However, it was deserted in the fifteenth century, only to be re-established starting around 1500. Since 1990, it has belonged administratively to Thuringia.

The mayor is Markus Kulle, elected in 2022.
