= Büttstedt =

- Municipality
- Coat of arms

- Location of Büttstedt within Eichsfeld district
- Interactive map of Büttstedt
- Location within Germany Location within Thuringia
- Coordinates: 51°15′N 10°18′E
- Country: Germany
- State: Thuringia
- District: Eichsfeld
- Municipal assoc.: Westerwald-Obereichsfeld

Government
  - Mayor (2022–28): Franz-Josef Degenhardt (CDU)

Area
  - Total: 7.53 km^{2} (2.91 sq mi)
- Elevation: 372 m (1,220 ft)

Population (2025-12-31)
  - Total: 856
  - Density: 114/km^{2} (294/sq mi)
- Time zone: UTC+01:00 (CET)
  - Summer (DST): UTC+02:00 (CEST)
- Postal codes: 37359
- Dialling codes: 036075
- Vehicle registration: EIC
- Website: www.buettstedt.de

Büttstedt is a municipality in the district of Eichsfeld in Thuringia, Germany.
