= Ferdinand Manns =

Ferdinand Manns (August 27 1844, in Witzenhausen – 26 July 1922, in Oldenburg) was a German composer and conductor as well as a court music director in the Grand Duchy of Oldenburg.

== Life ==
Manns was the son of a Witzenhausen customs official and received piano lessons in his early youth and, after his family moved to Kassel, violin lessons when he was about ten. In addition, he trained in compositional techniques. From the age of 17 he was active as a violinist in several orchestras, with his most prominent being the Bremen Theater Orchestra starting in 1866. He composed numerous pieces of stage music for the Bremen City Theater. Furthermore, Manns wrote three symphonies in Bremen, of which the second symphony in A major was premiered in Oldenburg on April 22, 1887, under his direction. Manns became known in his own time through a wealth of other orchestral and chamber music works. In 1888, he was appointed as the concertmaster in the Oldenburg Court Orchestra. This gave him an important advantage when the director of the court orchestra, court conductor Albert Dietrich, retired for health reasons in 1891. Manns was able to prevail in the subsequent application process against strong competition, such as a nephew of Max Bruch and a Hamburg choral conductor recommended by Johannes Brahms. Manns had been recommended at the time of his appointment as concertmaster by Hans von Bülow, under whom he had played several times in Bremen.

Manns, like Dietrich, was called to Oldenburg primarily for his achievements as a composer. He was faced with the difficult task of consolidating and expanding the level of the court orchestra achieved by his predecessor. According to his biographer Ernst Hinrichs, who refers to contemporary press reports, he did not succeed in this, although he was able to set new, more contemporary accents compared to his predecessor's concert practice, which was focused on Schumann and Brahms, and above all opened the way for music by Bruckner and Tchaikovsky to be performed in Oldenburg. Manns's problems, however, probably lay in the actual orchestral work, since, according to Hinrichs, he was unable to comply with the reform efforts of the time aimed at "stylistic unity" and "stylistic purity" in concert practice, which became especially evident after the turn of the century. Manns, like his predecessor, still represented the typical combination of composer and conductor of the 19th century and was not merely an exclusive conductor, as was embodied for the time by Hans von Bülow. In addition, the equipment of the court orchestra at the beginning of the 20th century no longer met the requirements that the new compositions (for example Anton Bruckner, Richard Strauss, etc.) placed on orchestra size, orchestral discipline and performance practice.

Manns retired in 1913 and was awarded the title of professor by Grand Duke Friedrich August for his services to Oldenburg's musical culture.
