= Lindewerra =

- Municipality
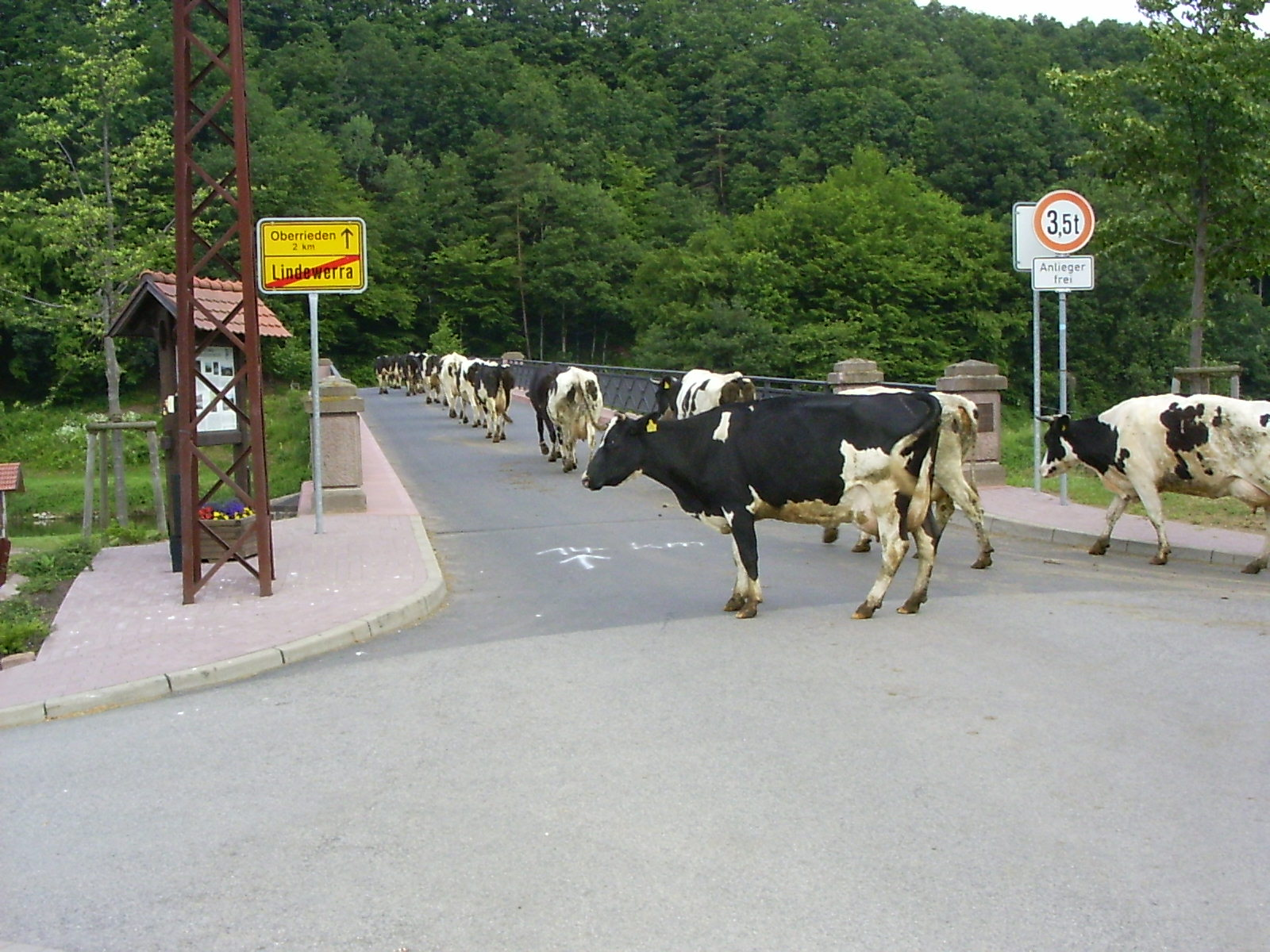

- Coat of arms

- Location of Lindewerra within Eichsfeld district
- Interactive map of Lindewerra
- Location within Germany Location within Thuringia
- Coordinates: 51°18′49″N 9°56′53″E
- Country: Germany
- State: Thuringia
- District: Eichsfeld
- Municipal assoc.: Hanstein-Rusteberg

Government
  - Mayor (2022–28): Gerhard Propf

Area
  - Total: 4.40 km^{2} (1.70 sq mi)
- Elevation: 150 m (490 ft)

Population (2025-12-31)
  - Total: 246
  - Density: 55.9/km^{2} (145/sq mi)
- Time zone: UTC+01:00 (CET)
  - Summer (DST): UTC+02:00 (CEST)
- Postal codes: 37318
- Dialling codes: 036087
- Vehicle registration: EIC
- Website: www.lindewerra.de

Lindewerra is a municipality in the district of Eichsfeld in Thuringia, Germany. It is part of the Verwaltungsgemeinschaft Hanstein-Rusteberg. Before the fall of the Berlin Wall in 1989 Lindewerra was one of the few villages in the German Democratic Republic that could be observed directly from the West. After the fall of the Berlin Wall a bridge was built to connect the village to the Hessian bank of the Werra River.
