= Bornhagen =

- Municipality
- Location of Bornhagen within Eichsfeld district
- Interactive map of Bornhagen
- Location within Germany Location within Thuringia
- Coordinates: 51°20′37″N 9°56′38″E
- Country: Germany
- State: Thuringia
- District: Eichsfeld
- Municipal assoc.: Hanstein-Rusteberg

Government
  - Mayor (2022–28): Tobias Beckmann

Area
  - Total: 6.59 km^{2} (2.54 sq mi)
- Elevation: 300 m (980 ft)

Population (2025-12-31)
  - Total: 236
  - Density: 35.8/km^{2} (92.8/sq mi)
- Time zone: UTC+01:00 (CET)
  - Summer (DST): UTC+02:00 (CEST)
- Postal codes: 37318
- Dialling codes: 036081
- Vehicle registration: EIC
- Website: www.vg-hanstein-rusteberg.de

Bornhagen is a municipality in the district of Eichsfeld in Thuringia, Germany, located at the foot of the ruins of Hanstein Castle. The town district Rimbach is positioned directly south of the castle citadel at an elevation of 370 m. Bornhagen is located 22 km south of Göttingen, 85 km northwest of the state capital Erfurt and 270 km southwest of Berlin. It is the westernmost settlement in Thuringia but does not contain the westernmost point which is 75 km south near Geisa.

Hanstein Castle was mentioned for the first time in official documents in the 9th century in Corvey Monastery, and is considered one of the largest castle ruins in central Germany. In the Middle Ages, the castle served as a prison. During the Thirty Years' War, it was partly destroyed by Swedish troops, after which it was no longer inhabited on a regular basis. Reconstruction work was begun on the castle in 1985 with the support of the local heritage society. The three-wing altar from the former castle chapel can be viewed in the Catholic Church in Rimbach. Bornhagen is also a popular tourist destination

Bornhagen contains a full-scale replica of the Memorial to the Murdered Jews of Europe.

== Gallery ==
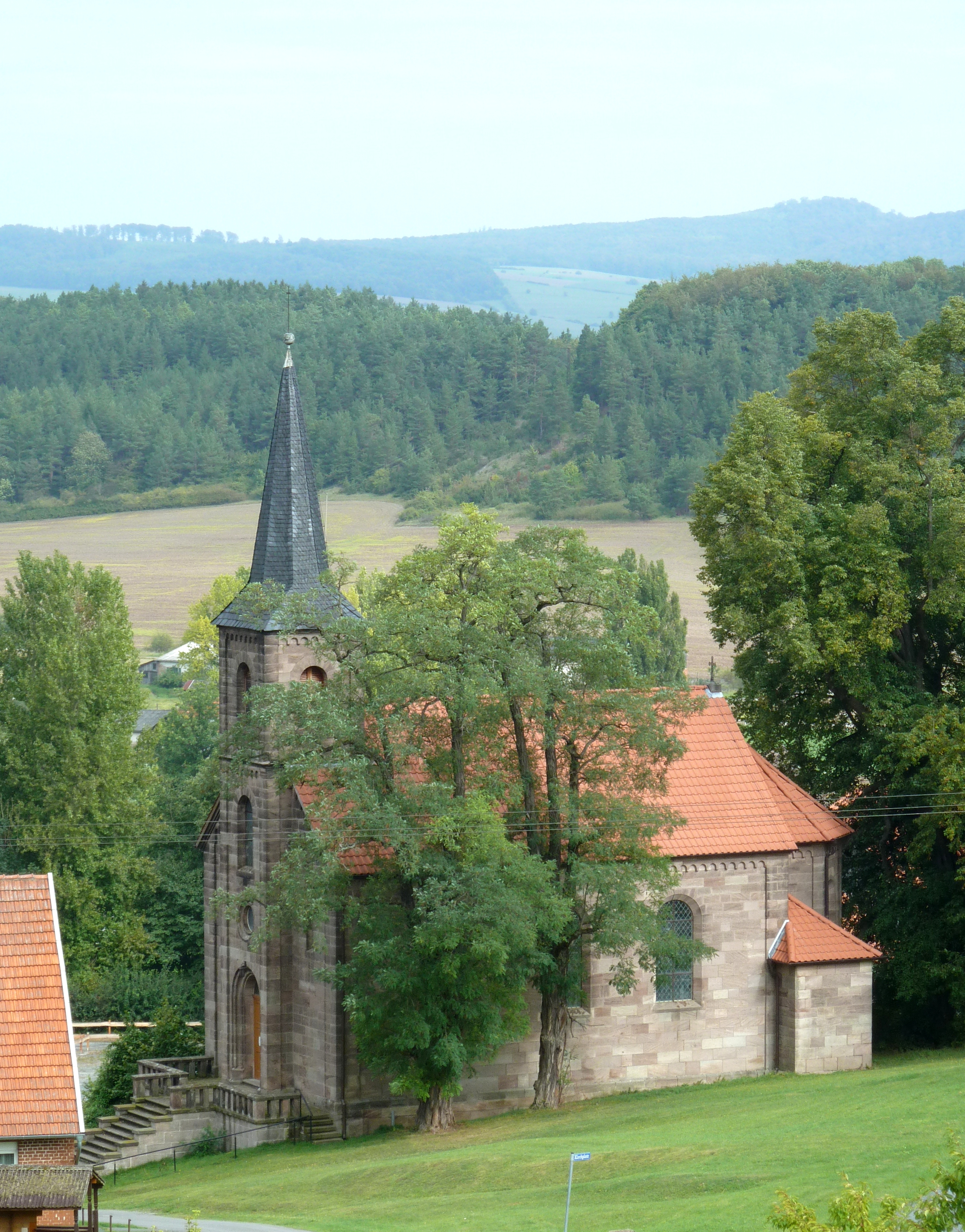
Lutheran church

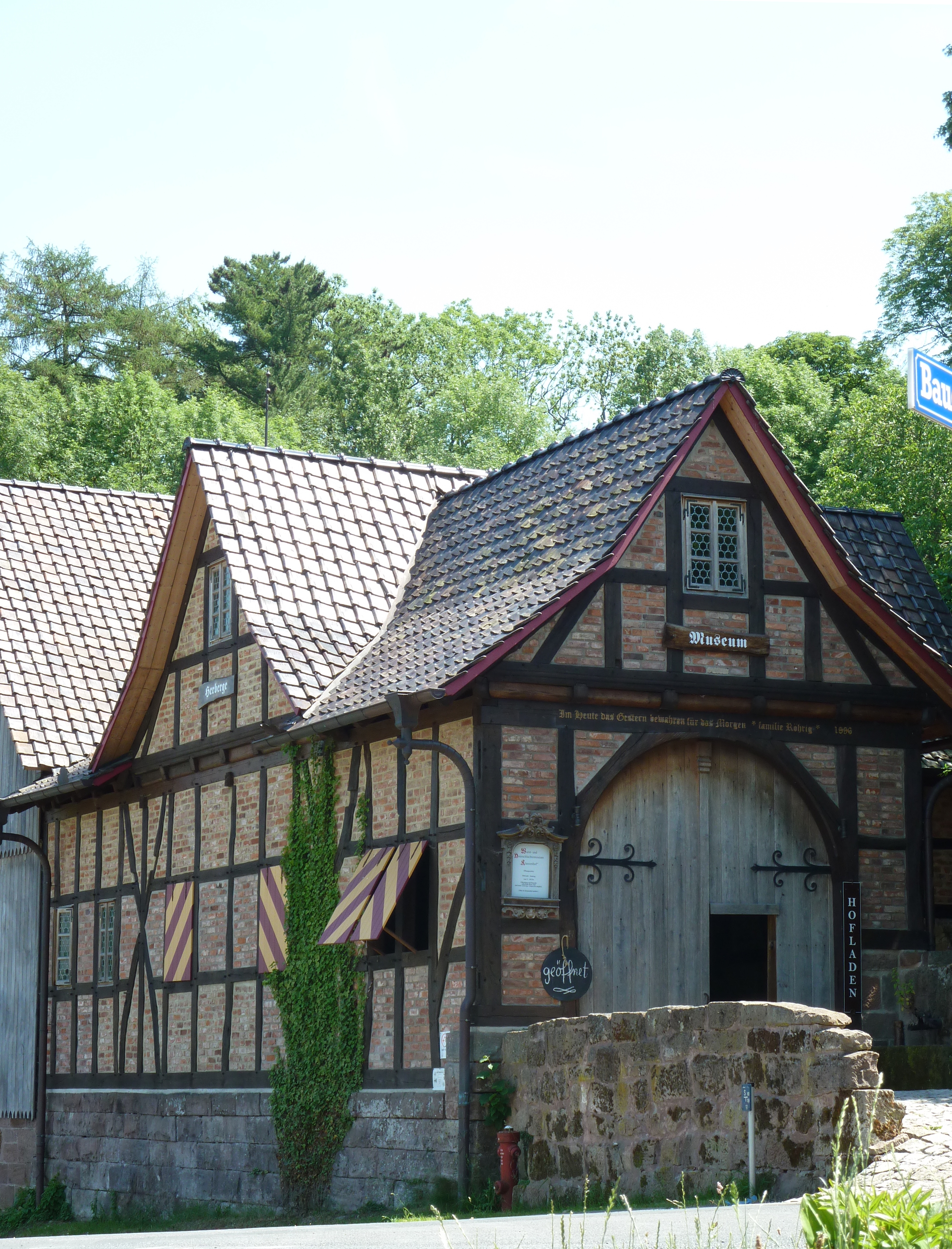
Sausage museum

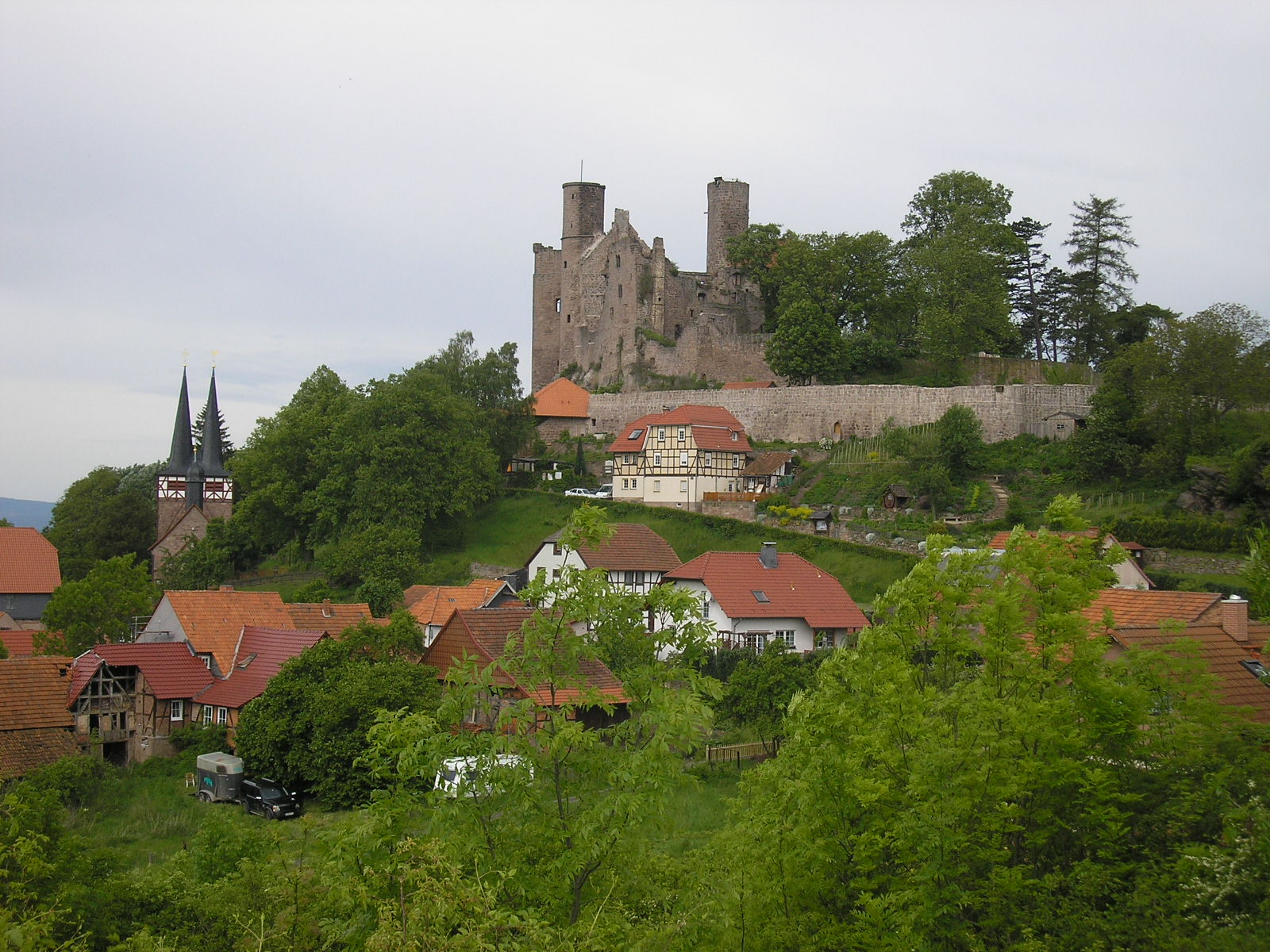
Burg Hanstein

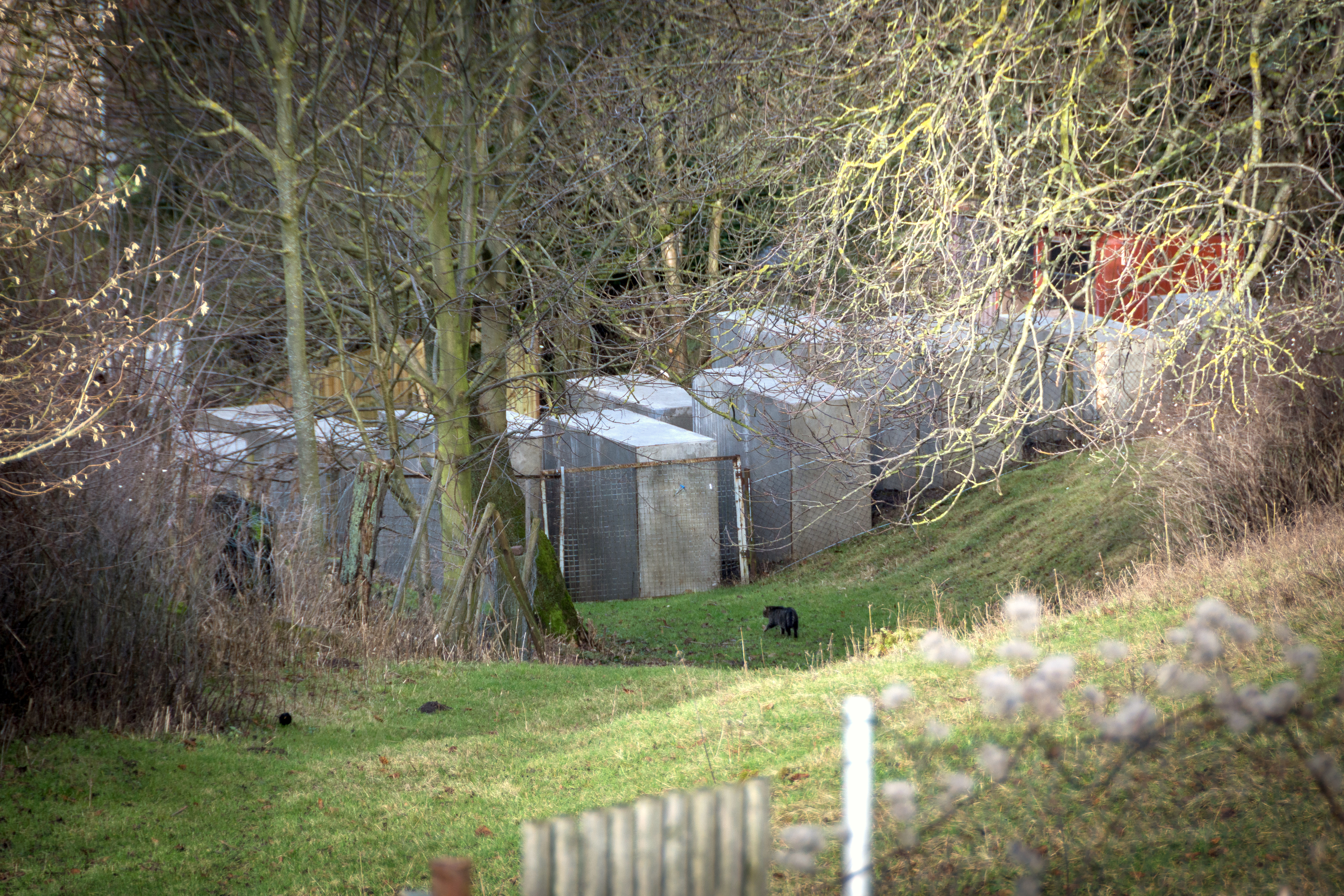
A replica of the Holocaust memorial was erected on the property adjacent to the home of the far-right politician Björn Höcke.
