= Freienhagen, Thuringia =

Freienhagen
- Municipality
- Coat of arms

- Location of Freienhagen within Eichsfeld district
- Interactive map of Freienhagen
- Location within Germany Location within Thuringia
- Coordinates: 51°20′33″N 10°15′25″E
- Country: Germany
- State: Thuringia
- District: Eichsfeld
- Municipal assoc.: Hanstein-Rusteberg

Government
  - Mayor (2019–25): Markus Kaspari (CDU)

Area
  - Total: 4.10 km^{2} (1.58 sq mi)
- Elevation: 305 m (1,001 ft)

Population (2025-12-31)
  - Total: 288
  - Density: 70.2/km^{2} (182/sq mi)
- Time zone: UTC+01:00 (CET)
  - Summer (DST): UTC+02:00 (CEST)
- Postal codes: 37318
- Dialling codes: 036083
- Vehicle registration: EIC
- Website: www.vg-hanstein-rusteberg.de

Freienhagen is a municipality in the district of Eichsfeld in Thuringia, Germany. It is part of the Verwaltungsgemeinschaft Hanstein-Rusteberg.
