= Eichsfeld (district) =

Coordinates: 51°20′N 10°15′E

- District
- Flag Coat of arms
- Country: Germany
- State: Thuringia
- Capital: Heilbad Heiligenstadt

Government
  - District admin.: Dr. Marion Frant (CDU)

Area
  - Total: 991.04 km^{2} (382.64 sq mi)

Population (31 December 2022)
  - Total: 103,205
  - Density: 100/km^{2} (270/sq mi)
- Time zone: UTC+01:00 (CET)
  - Summer (DST): UTC+02:00 (CEST)
- Vehicle registration: EIC, HIG, WBS
- Website: www.kreis-eic.de

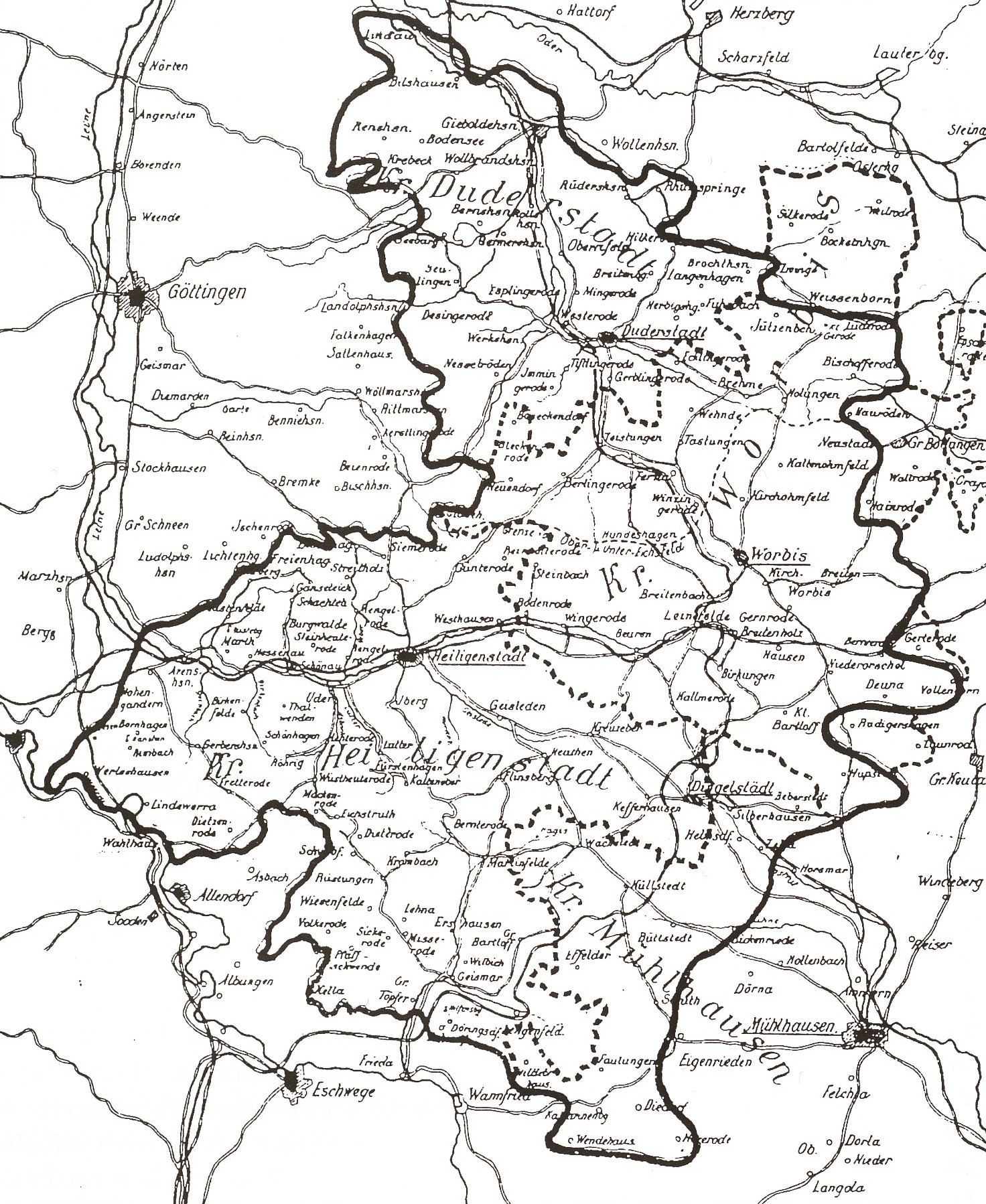
Historical region Eichsfeld (until 1945)

Eichsfeld is a district in Thuringia, Germany, and part of the historical region of Eichsfeld. It is bounded by (from the east and clockwise) the districts of Nordhausen, Kyffhäuserkreis and Unstrut-Hainich-Kreis, and by the states of Hesse (district Werra-Meißner-Kreis) and Lower Saxony (district Göttingen).

== History ==
In medieval times the Eichsfeld region, which is larger than the current district Eichsfeld, was property of the Archbishops of Mainz.

Eichsfeld was the only region of Thuringia not to accept the Protestant Reformation, largely due to the efforts of the Archbishops of Mainz.

In 1801, the clerical states were dissolved, and the Kingdom of Prussia gained the region, only to lose it again in the Napoleonic Wars. In the Congress of Vienna (1815) Prussia as well as the Kingdom of Hanover raised claims for the Eichsfeld. The region was divided between both states. Although Hanover was annexed by Prussia in 1866, this border remained the boundary between two Prussian provinces, later between East and West Germany, and today between Thuringia and Lower Saxony.

The present district was established in 1994 by merging the former districts of Worbis and Heiligenstadt.

== Geography ==
The district is named after the historical region of Eichsfeld, which covers the northern portions of the present district and parts of Lower Saxony, the area around Duderstadt, called "Untereichsfeld" (lower Eichsfeld). It is a hilly countryside, that is attached to the Harz hills in the north. Incidentally it is the geographical centre of Germany. The Leine and Unstrut rivers both rise in the Eichsfeld.

The name is believed to be derived from Eichenfeld, which means "field of oaks". A less popular theory is the origin in the word Eisfeld ("field of ice").

== Coat of arms ==
The coat of arms displays the heraldic eagle of Brandenburg together with the Wheel of Mainz, which was a symbol of the bishops of Mainz. These arms were granted shortly after Prussia gained the Eichsfeld (1801). In 1816 the Eichsfeld was not a geographical unit anymore, and the arms became irrelevant. They were reintroduced in 1945 (used until 1952) and again in 1994.

== Towns and municipalities ==
Clickable map of towns and municipalities in the district

Verwaltungsgemeinschaft-free towns
1. Dingelstädt
2. Heilbad Heiligenstadt
3. Leinefelde-Worbis
and municipalities
1. Am Ohmberg
2. Asbach-Sickenberg
3. Dietzenrode-Vatterode
4. Niederorschel
5. Sonnenstein
6. Uder

Verwaltungsgemeinschaften
1. Eichsfeld-Wipperaue; 1. Breitenworbis^{1}; 2. Buhla; 3. Gernrode; 4. Haynrode; 5. Kirchworbis; 2. Ershausen/Geismar; 1. Dieterode; 2. Geismar; 3. Kella; 4. Krombach; 5. Pfaffschwende; 6. Schimberg^{1}; 7. Schwobfeld; 8. Sickerode; 9. Volkerode; 10. Wiesenfeld	3. Hanstein-Rusteberg; 1. Arenshausen; 2. Bornhagen; 3. Burgwalde; 4. Freienhagen; 5. Fretterode; 6. Gerbershausen; 7. Hohengandern^{1}; 8. Kirchgandern; 9. Lindewerra; 10. Marth; 11. Rohrberg; 12. Rustenfelde; 13. Schachtebich; 14. Wahlhausen; 4. Leinetal; 1. Bodenrode-Westhausen^{1}; 2. Geisleden; 3. Heuthen; 4. Reinholterode; 5. Steinbach; 6. Wingerode	5. Lindenberg/Eichsfeld; 1. Berlingerode; 2. Brehme; 3. Ecklingerode; 4. Ferna; 5. Tastungen; 6. Teistungen^{1}; 7. Wehnde; 6. Westerwald-Obereichsfeld; 1. Büttstedt; 2. Effelder; 3. Großbartloff; 4. Küllstedt^{1}; 5. Wachstedt
^{1}seat of the Verwaltungsgemeinschaft; ^{2}town
