= Eichsfeld-Südharz =

Coordinates: 51.533°N 10.417°E

Eichsfeld-Südharz was a Verwaltungsgemeinschaft ("collective municipality") in the district Eichsfeld, in Thuringia, Germany. The seat of the Verwaltungsgemeinschaft was in Weißenborn-Lüderode. The Verwaltungsgemeinschaft was disbanded on 1 December 2011, when its constituent municipalities (except Am Ohmberg) merged into the new municipality Sonnenstein.

The Verwaltungsgemeinschaft Eichsfeld-Südharz consisted of the following municipalities:

1. Am Ohmberg
2. Bockelnhagen
3. Holungen
4. Jützenbach
5. Silkerode
6. Steinrode
7. Stöckey
8. Weißenborn-Lüderode
9. Zwinge
