= Eller =

Eller may refer to

- Eller (surname)
- Düsseldorf-Eller, an urban borough of Düsseldorf, Germany
- Ediger-Eller, a community on the Moselle in Rhineland-Palatinate, Germany
- Eller (Rhume), a river of Thuringia and Lower Saxony, Germany
  - Weilroder Eller, a headstream of the Eller
  - Geroder Eller, a headstream of the Eller
- Eller (sculpture), sculpture by Metin Yurdanur in Abdi İpekçi Park, Ankara
- Eller Beck, a river in North Yorkshire, England
- Eller College of Management, a business school at the University of Arizona, USA
