= Geisleden =

- Municipality
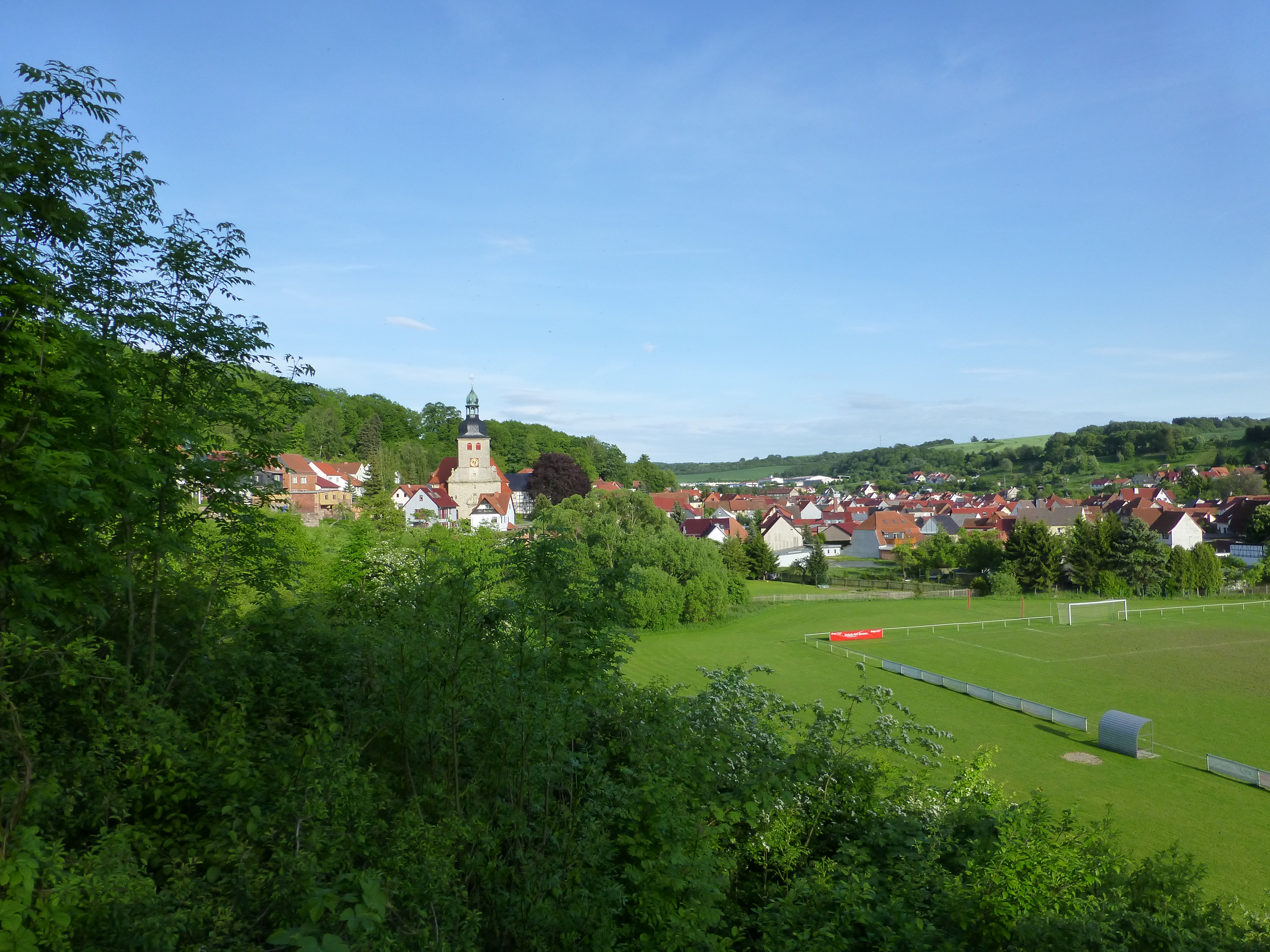

- Coat of arms

- Location of Geisleden within Eichsfeld district
- Interactive map of Geisleden
- Location within Germany Location within Thuringia
- Coordinates: 51°21′3″N 10°11′45″E
- Country: Germany
- State: Thuringia
- District: Eichsfeld
- Municipal assoc.: Leinetal

Government
  - Mayor (2022–28): Dr. Marion Frant (CDU)

Area
  - Total: 16.58 km^{2} (6.40 sq mi)
- Elevation: 320 m (1,050 ft)

Population (2025-12-31)
  - Total: 985
  - Density: 59.4/km^{2} (154/sq mi)
- Time zone: UTC+01:00 (CET)
  - Summer (DST): UTC+02:00 (CEST)
- Postal codes: 37308
- Dialling codes: 036084
- Vehicle registration: EIC
- Website: www.vg-leinetal.de

Geisleden is a municipality in the district of Eichsfeld in Thuringia, Germany. It is located about 4 kilometres (2.5 mi) southeast of Heiligenstadt in the valley formed by the river Geislede. Other neighboring towns are Westhausen in the north, Kreuzebra to the east, and Heuthen toward the southeast.

Historical records show that Geisleden existed at least as early as the 11th century. For example, in 1028 A.D., a provincial synod was held in this old town. Geisleden belonged to the Electorate of Mainz until 1802 when it was incorporated into the province of Saxony in the Kingdom of Prussia. Geisleden was included in the Soviet occupation zone after World War II, before joining the district of Erfurt in East Germany until 1990, when the eastern and western parts of Germany merged into a single country once again.
