= Carl Giesecke =

German organ builder (1812–1888)

Carl Giesecke (2 September 1812 – 28 September 1888) was a German organ builder who became known as a supplier of reed pipes.

== Life and work ==
Born in Göttingen, Giesecke was the son of the clothier Otto Heinrich Giesecke and Marie Caroline Aue. His grandfather and great-grandfather were surgeons in Schoningen.

Giesecke learned organ building from 1840 to 1844 from Johann Friedrich Schulze, on whose style he oriented himself structurally and tonally. On 1 April 1844, he acquired citizenship in Göttingen, set up his own business there and was soon one of the most important organ builders in southern Lower Saxony. He initially supplied Schulze with reed stops and other organ parts. By 1860, the workshop had attained a leading position as a subcontractor and from 1870 onwards supplied reeds and organ parts exclusively. Until 1869, he created over 20 new buildings.

On 28 July 1844 he married Wilhelmine Rosine Charlotte Schulz from Hameln, with whom he had six children. His son Hermann (11 May 1847 in Göttingen - 12 February 1928 ibid) was also an organ builder and partner of his father shortly after 1880. According to a contractual agreement, the company traded as "Carl Giesecke & Sohn" from 1884. Hermann took over the construction of the reeds from then on, while his father only made mechanical parts. In view of the growing demand for reeds, the building of complete organs was abandoned.

Since Hermann had no male descendants, the company was leased in 1909 to Adolf Hammer, the co-owner of the Emil Hammer Orgelbau company. Hermann's two daughters Helene Giesecke and Gertrud Steggewentz became partners and the company was named "Gieseckes Erben und W. Furtwängler". The number of employees grew to over 75 after the Second World War. In 2006, the company was transformed into a limited liability company. Continuing the company tradition, about 25 employees supplied organ builders worldwide with reed and labial pipes. In 2012, the company filed for insolvency, as a result of which the workshop was dissolved and business operations ceased.

== List of works (selection) ==
The size of the instruments is indicated in the fifth column by the number of manuals and the number of sounding stops in the sixth column. A capital "P" stands for an independent pedal, a small "p" for an attached pedal. Italicisation indicates that the organ in question is no longer preserved or that only the casing is preserved.

Year	Location	Church	Picture	Manual	Stops	Notes
1848	Weende (Göttingen)	St. Petri	I/P	8	Some stops are preserved	
1850	Moringen	Stadtkirche		II/P	23	New construction with integration of some stops by Christian Vater. (1743); 1976 restoration by Martin Haspelmath; casing and several stops by Giesecke preserved
um 1850	Oldenrode	Ev.-luth. Kirche		I/P	6	New construction; casing preserved
1851	Dassensen	Ev.-luth. Kirche		I/P	7	Only lower casing in the parapet preserved
1853	Sudershausen	St. Johannis		I/p	7	New building; preserved almost unchanged
1854	Waake	Dorfkirche		I/P	7	New construction; Casing and Sub-baß 16′ preserved
1855	Trögen	St. Laurentius		I/P	6	New building; some stops preserved
1855	Altenau	St. Nikolai	II/P	15	New building; rebuilt in 1965 by Schmidt & Thiemann with a rückpositiv (today II/P/16)	
1856	Silkerode	St. Nicolai		II/P	14	New building; after 1900 reconstruction by Georg Kiessling & Söhne and restoration by Schönefeld (Orgelbau) in 2002
ca. 1859	Stöckheim	St. Martin		II/P	16	Neubau
1860	Scheden	St.-Markus-Kirche		II/P	22	Reconstruction of the organ from Johann Dietrich Kuhlmann (1829)
1862	Bockelnhagen	Ev.-luth. Kirche		II/P	11	
1863	Rosdorf	Ev.-luth. Kirche		II/P	28	1911 Rebuilt by P. Furtwängler & Hammer, restored in 1997 by Werner Bosch Orgelbau.
1864–1865	Göttingen	St. Marien		II/P	18	In 1926, P. Furtwängler & Hammer took over the majority of the stops in the new building.
