= Johann Dietrich Kuhlmann =

German organ builder (c.1775–1846)

Johann Dietrich Kuhlmann (c. 1775 – 1846) was a German organ builder. As son-in-law and successor of Johann Stephan Heeren, he worked in Gottsbüren.

== Life and career ==
Kuhlmann became acquainted with the family business of Johann Stephan Heeren as an employee. Together with him, he created the organ in Adelebsen around 1800. After the death of Heeren's son-in-law Johann Friedrich Euler in 1795, Kuhlmann married Heeren's daughter Anna Elisabeth. Heeren's son Johann Christoph worked in the workshop during the last years of his father's life and took over the workshop together with Kuhlmann in 1804. As a result, the company now called itself "Heeren et Kuhlmann". When Heeren's grandson Balthasar Conrad Euler joined the business around 1815, it was renamed "Euler and Kuhlmann". His son Georg Carl Kuhlmann also became an organ builder and can be traced in Westphalia with several new organ buildings. Johann Dietrich Kuhlmann worked mainly in the Orgellandschaft Südniedersachsen. The family business was moved to Hofgeismar in 1910 and continued well into the 20th century. It is considered the oldest organ building company in Germany.

== Work ==
Year	Location	Church	Picture	Manual	Stops	Notes
um 1800	Adelebsen	St. Martini		I/P	13	Together with Johann Stephan Heeren
1813	Vernawahlshausen	St.-Margarethenkirche		I/P	12	New construction or conversion using older housing parts.
1816–1817	Göttingen	Ev.-ref. Kirche		II/P	15	Originally built for Stöckheim (Northeim); transferred to Göttingen in 1860 by Giesecke and redisposed; 1913/14 new interior work by Furtwängler & Hammer with additional Brustwerk; 1969/70 new pipework by Paul Ott; upper part of the facade and one stop from 1817 preserved.
1818–1819	Zennern	Michaeliskirche		I/P	12	Together with Euler; five stops and casing preserved.
vor 1820	Hemeln	Ev.-luth. Kirche		II/P	15	Together with Euler; largely preserved.
ca. 1820	Herlinghausen	Ev. Kirche		I/P	10	Kuhlmann and Euler are presumed to be the builders, but are not clearly documented.
1824	Bühren	St. Michaelis-Kirche				Completely preserved.
1824	Erbsen	St. Vitus		I/P	12	Preserved
1825	Barterode	St. Pankratii		I/P	15	Together with Euler.
1829	Scheden	St.-Markus-Kirche		I/P	15	1829 new construction using older material (parts of the supporting structure and a few stops), 1860 reconstruction by Giesecke and 1899 by Furtwängler & Hammer, 1937 restoration to baroque conception by Ott and extension of the single-manual organ by a Rückpositiv (II/P/22), 2011 restoration.
1840	Bad Fredeburg	St.-Georgkirche		II/P		Moved to new church without alterations in 1932; extensively rebuilt by Anton Feith in 1943 (35 stops); 15 stops preserved by Kuhlmann.
1844	Hohenwepel	St. Margaretha				Replaced by new building by Anton Feith in 1927
