= Bernterode =

Bernterode may refer to two places in Thuringia, Germany:

- Bernterode, Heilbad Heiligenstadt
- Bernterode, Breitenworbis
