= Dennis Kramer =

German-American basketball player (1992–2023)

Personal information
- Born: 10 January 1992 Cologne, Germany
- Died: 27 August 2023 (aged 31) Barterode, Germany
- Listed height: 2.09 m (6 ft 10 in)
- Listed weight: 110 kg (243 lb)

Career information
- High school: La Costa Canyon (Carlsbad, California)
- College: San Diego (2010–2014)
- NBA draft: 2014: undrafted
- Playing career: 2014–2023
- Positions: Power forward, center

Career history
- 2014: Baunach Young Pikes
- 2014–2015: TBB Trier
- 2015–2017: Baskets Oldenburg
- 2017–2021: BG Göttingen
- 2022–2023: ASC 1846 Göttingen

Dennis Arvid Kramer (10 January 1992 – 27 August 2023) was a German-American professional basketball player. After studying in the United States, Kramer began a professional career in his native country. He played 188 games in the Basketball Bundesliga.

With the German junior national team, Kramer reached fifth place at the 2011 U20 European Championships. He was also a German A2 international.

== Life and career ==
Dennis Arvid Kramer was the son of Arvid Kramer, who was a long-time player and later club manager for Telekom Baskets Bonn in Germany before returning to the United States in 2004. Dennis Kramer graduated from La Costa Canyon High School in Encinitas, California and went on to study at the nearby University of San Diego, where he played for the varsity team Toreros in the West Coast Conference (WCC) of the NCAA.

During Kramer's time in San Diego, the WCC championships were held between the Gaels of the St. Mary's College of California and the Bulldogs of Gonzaga University, in whose ranks among others the German youth international Elias Harris was played. The Toreros remained without major success and also missed participation in a national NCAA postseason tournament. At the end of his studies, Kramer ranked fifth on the Toreros' all-time list in blocked shots. With the German U18 national team, he participated in the U18 European Championships in 2010. One year latet, he achieved a fifth place with the German junior national team at the U20 European Championships in 2011.

After completing his studies in 2014, Kramer began a professional career and returned to his native country, where he signed a contract with Brose Bamberg. He played with a double license in particular for the Bamberg " farm team " Bike-Café Messingschlager from Baunach in the second-tier division ProA. In early November 2014, he transferred to first division rivals TBB Trier. He completed 25 Bundesliga games for Trier. In 2015 he took part in the 2015 Summer Universiade in Gwangju with the German A2 national team and won the silver medal at the event. Kramer accepted an offer from another Bundesliga club, EWE Baskets Oldenburg for the 2015–16 season.

In June 2017, Kramer moved from Oldenburg to Lower Saxony Bundesliga rivals BG Göttingen, for whom he played until 2021. In 2022 he became a member of the regional league team ASC 46 Göttingen.

Kramer died in a car accident near Barterode, at the age of 31.

== See also ==
- List of basketball players who died during their careers
