= Weilroder Eller =

Location
- Country: Germany
- State: Thuringia

Physical characteristics
- Mouth
  - location: Eller
  - coordinates: 51.5550°N 10.3726°E

Basin features
- Progression: Eller→ Rhume→ Leine→ Aller→ Weser→ North Sea

Weilroder Eller is a river of Thuringia, Germany. At its confluence with the Geroder Eller near Zwinge, the Eller is formed.

== See also ==
- List of rivers of Thuringia
