= Werner Hagedorn =

German physician and surgeon (1831–1894)

- Born: Werner August Hagedorn; 2 July 1831; Westhausen, Germany
- Died: 20 June 1894 (aged 62); Magdeburg, Saxony-Anhalt, Germany
- Education: Humboldt University of Berlin
- Occupation: Surgeon

Werner August Hagedorn (2 July 1831, in Westhausen – 20 June 1894, in Magdeburg) was a German surgeon.

He studied medicine at the University of Berlin, where his instructors included Johannes Peter Müller and Bernhard von Langenbeck. In 1854 he received his doctorate with the thesis De forcipe Schoelleriana obstetricia. From 1855 he worked as an assistant at the hospital in Magdeburg-Altstadt, where in 1863 he was appointed head of the surgical department.

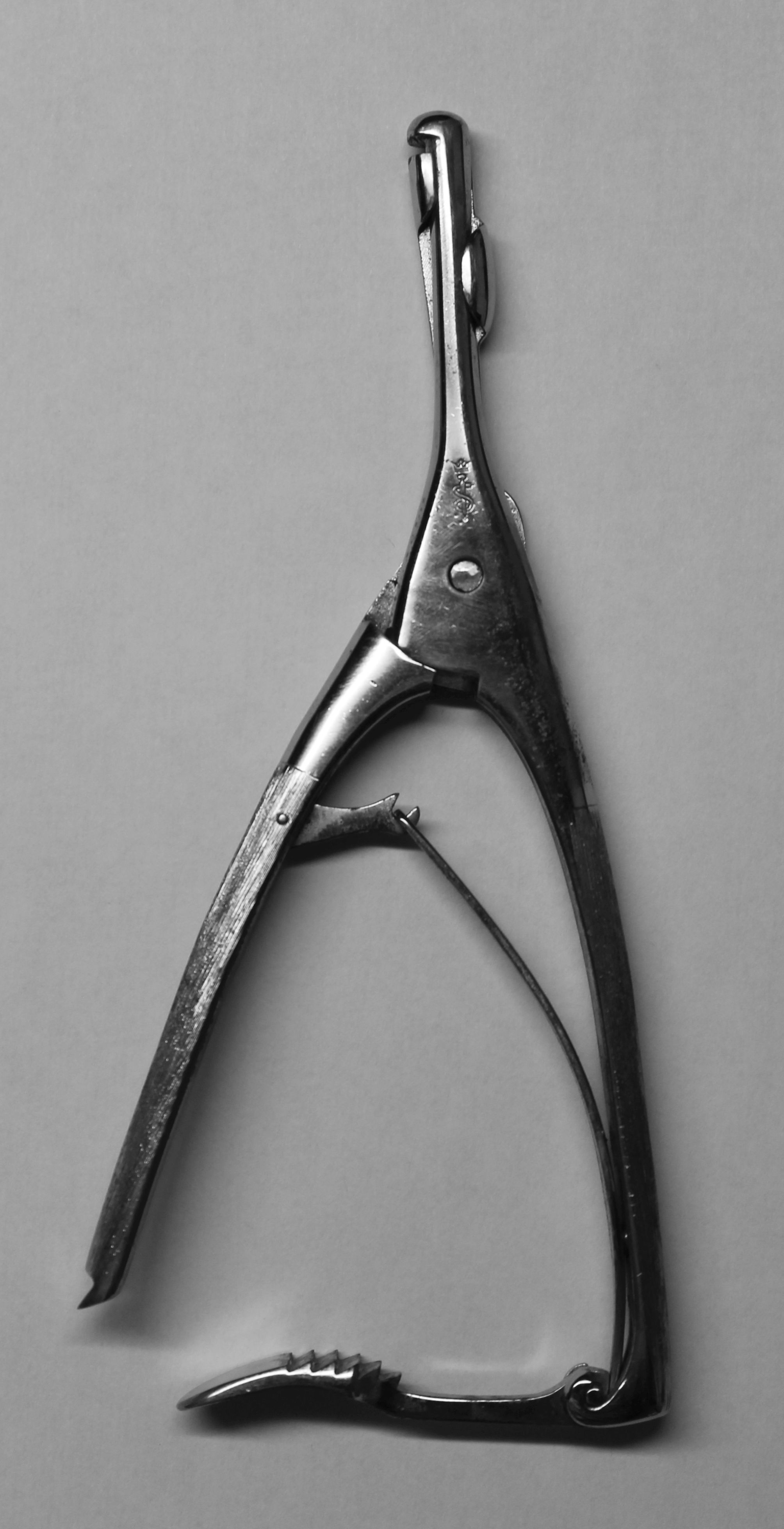
Hagedorn needle holder.

He is credited for introducing Listerian antiseptic methods at the Magdeburg-Altstadt hospital. His name is associated with the "Hagedorn needle", which is a curved surgical needle flattened on the sides. He was the author of Frisches getrocknetes Moos (Sphagnum), ein gutes Verbandmaterial ("Fresh dried sphagnum, a good dressing material"; 1883), an article published in Langenbeck's Archiv.
