= Steinbach, Eichsfeld =

Steinbach
- Municipality
- Coat of arms

- Location of Steinbach within Eichsfeld district
- Interactive map of Steinbach
- Location within Germany Location within Thuringia
- Coordinates: 51°25′N 10°13′E
- Country: Germany
- State: Thuringia
- District: Eichsfeld
- Municipal assoc.: Leinetal

Government
  - Mayor (2022–28): Gerd Rittmeier

Area
  - Total: 8.46 km^{2} (3.27 sq mi)
- Elevation: 330 m (1,080 ft)

Population (2025-12-31)
  - Total: 528
  - Density: 62.4/km^{2} (162/sq mi)
- Time zone: UTC+01:00 (CET)
  - Summer (DST): UTC+02:00 (CEST)
- Postal codes: 37308
- Dialling codes: 036085
- Vehicle registration: EIC
- Website: www.vg-leinetal.de

Steinbach (German pronunciation: [ˈʃtaɪnbax]) is a municipality in the Eichsfeld in Thuringia, Germany.
