= Holungen =

Village in Thuringia, Germany

- Ortschaft of Sonnenstein
- Coat of arms
- Interactive map of Holungen
- Location within Germany Location within Thuringia
- Coordinates: 51°29′27″N 10°23′36″E
- Country: Germany
- State: Thuringia
- District: Eichsfeld
- Municipality: Sonnenstein

Area
  - Total: 6.79 km^{2} (2.62 sq mi)
- Elevation: 350 m (1,150 ft)

Population (2010-12-31)
  - Total: 891
  - Density: 131/km^{2} (340/sq mi)
- Time zone: UTC+01:00 (CET)
  - Summer (DST): UTC+02:00 (CEST)
- Postal codes: 37345
- Dialling codes: 036077

Holungen is a village and a former municipality in the district of Eichsfeld in Thuringia, Germany. Since 1 December 2011, it is part of the municipality Sonnenstein, of which it is an Ortschaft. It lies approximately 35 km (22 mi) from the university town of Göttingen. With a population of around 1,000, it is one of the medium-sized villages in the district.

== Coat of arms ==
On the coat of arms, the right half represents the Sonnenstein, a hill very close to the town. On the upper left quarter, the Wheel of Mainz represents the Archbishopric of Mainz, and the lower left quarter shows two crossed hammers indicative of potash mining and symbolising the environment. Over many decades, mining was of enormous economic importance.

== Origin of the name ==
The research into the origin of the name traces it back to antiquity. Evidence for the origin comes mostly from documents in the Gerode Monastery. The name “Holungen” is said to derive from the German word “Hold” (= a gentle benevolent goddess or woman). However, in speech, this word is indistinguishable from “Holt”, an older German word for wood. In old title deeds the name also appears as “Holdungen”, which suggests the name could also derive from “Haulungen”, meaning “pasture in a clearing on sloping ground”. This interpretation infers that Holungen was designated as a “Waldsiedlung” (settlement in a forest). Villages whose names end in “-ungen” were all founded in an earlier settlement period. Therefore, is it possible that Holungen's founding could date back as far as the initial colonisation of modern Germany by Germanic peoples. It could have existed as far back as 531, the Second Settlement Period (all placenames ending in “-ungen”), when the Franks conquered Thuringia. Later on, the northern part of Eichsfeld, including Holungen, belonged to the Saxons. Saxon characteristics and peculiarities were taken up. This also explains why a language border (isogloss) runs through Holungen. Residents speak Low German, while people of the neighbouring town of Bischofferode speak standard German.

== Location ==
Holungen is located at the foot of the Ohm Hills at the bottom of the Bode valley, about 35 km from the Harz mountains. It is a so-called Haufendorf ("clustered village"; denotes an irregular, unplanned and quite closely packed village, built around a central square). To the south lie the Sonder and the Ohmberg with the “Wilde Kirche” (Wild Church). The Hohenkammer lies to the west, where the Segeltal valley separates it from the Sonder. To the north, the 486-metre-high Sonnenstein rises above the village. In addition, the Graseforst is found there. The course of the Bode runs along the valley floor to the east. There is also a large spoil heap from potash mining, which is nearly as big as the adjacent mountains.

Holungen lies 350 m above sea level. It is well protected from the easterly winds and other external influences by mountains. Its soil is formed from crystalline rocks, made of minerals such as quartz, feldspar and mica. The erosion of rocks forms sandy soil from quartz, and clay and loam from potash/feldspar-based rocks.

== History ==
=== Early history ===
According to documents found in the monastery at Gerode, Holungen was founded between 531 and 800. In the following centuries, there was much armed conflict near the village and in the surrounding area. In 933, Henry I beat the Magyars at the Unstrut river. Twenty-two years later, his son Otto the Great did the same at the Lechfelde, bringing peace to the area. Between 1118 and 1120 the Gerode Monastery was founded.

In 1247, the Thuringian landgrave Heinrich Raspe died, bringing conflict back to the area. From 1236 to 1247, he was Landesherr (territorial lord) of part of the march of Tu-der-stede, modern-day Duderstadt. He was also brother-in-law to Elisabeth of Hungary. In 1246 he was elected counter-king to Conrad IV, son of Frederick II. Although his forces defeated Conrad's at the battle of Nidda, he died shortly afterwards, and after his death fighting broke out over the order of succession for the title Landgrave of Thuringia, during which Holungen was devastated. Many inhabitants fled to Duderstadt. Some evidence for this comes from deeds dating to 1266 and 1299. The documents of 1266 also give us the first mention of Holungen, under the name “Haldrungen”. Between 1350 and 1370, the village was rebuilt again and belonged to the county of Lohra. In 1370, Holungen became a part of the county of Honstein and in 1431, it became by exchange the monastery village of the monastery at Gerode. In 1525, Holungen was destroyed during the course of the German Peasants' War.

=== The period until the German Empire ===
The Thirty Years' War arrived and reached Holungen, and in 1626, much devastation was caused by the army of Duke Christian of Brunswick. In 1701, Prussia became a kingdom, but Eichsfeld and Holungen remained subordinate to the Electorate of Mainz. Between 1740–1786 Eichsfeld took up arms in the service of Austria against Frederick the Great and fought against Prussia. Many inhabitants of Holungen were involved in these wars or were enlisted with the “Kurmainzischen Husarencorps” (Hussar Corps of the Electorate of Mainz). Thus even today there are still some Holungen surnames in Vienna. In 1802, Eichsfeld was finally annexed to Prussia. This took place on 3 August, the birthday of the King of Prussia Frederick William III.

Prussian rule lasted only for four years and ten weeks, up to the years 1806 and 1807, when Prussia was nearly completely destroyed. In addition, half of its constituent states, as well as its status as a great power, were taken from it. In 1806, Prussia lost the Battle of Jena-Auerstedt, with the result that, in December that year, Napoleon took possession of the two Eichsfeld districts, including Holungen. Frederick William III fled with his wife and the princes to Memel. The French required masses of supplies, which the Holungers had to furnish. In 1807, Eichsfeld became part of the Kingdom of Westphalia with its capital at Kassel. On 1 January 1808 the Napoleonic Code came into effect. Young men had to serve in the French army. During this period, many troops marched through Eichsfeld and settled in Holungen. After the struggle for liberty, Eichsfeld was returned to Prussia. ‘Ordered’ laws were created, and Worbis received their own city and regional courts. Holungen was assigned to the judicial office (Gerichtsamt) at Gerode. At that time Holungen had 650 inhabitants. In 1841, Holungen received its first Kaplan, literally “Chaplain”, a term used in German to mean a Roman Catholic priest in the first few years after his ordination. Since 28 January 1844, full Mass has been held every Sunday and Saint's Day.

In 1848, the year of many attempted revolutions in large parts of Europe, violence in the district of Worbis was widespread, leading to the formation of Bürgerwehren (vigilante militia groups), under the control of the mayor in each village. The vigilantes were equipped with pikes, sabres and rifles. One year later the setting up of the Grundbuchamt (lit. land register office) in the district court of Worbis was completed. Cholera came to Worbis district in 1850. Most deaths occurred in neighbouring Weißenborn, Holungen was only minimally affected. In September 1855, the king visited many places in the district. During the wars of independence, the Eichsfeld had suffered much, leading to crop failures and widespread illness. Holungen received money from the king for the reconstruction of several burned-down houses. On 2 February 1861, King Frederick William IV died, and his brother William I took his place. In the same year, the shooting club was formed, and the Chaussee (main road) was extended over the Graseforst. The Holungers were dissatisfied with this extension, since they had supported a different route, one which would have been more favourable for the area but had been dropped. In February 1865, this led to a big court case, which the Holungers lost. The Chaussee led from Worbis over the Sonnenstein to Gerode and was half-an-hour further away than the old road, which almost completely cut Holungen off from long-distance traffic.

=== The period of the German Empire ===
The years 1870 and 1871 saw the Franco-Prussian War, and on 30 January 1871, Germany became an empire under the Prussian King William I. The soldiers returned home with the Iron Cross, the Kriegsgedenkmünze (War Service Medal) and other service decorations. Many Kriegskameradschaften (veterans’ groups) were formed, and later joined by a Kriegerverein (veterans’ association). In Holungen, support for Kaiser Wilhelm was very high. This was due in large part to the fact that a Holunger (Josef Hildebrandt), was the Kaiser's driver from 1861–1888. At this time, Holungen had approximately 650 inhabitants, two nursery gardens, one Hirtenhaus (lit. shepherd's house), one school, one local pub (Am. inn) and one fire pond. It covered roughly 98 acres / 40 hectares (196 Äcker).

On 1 April 1876, rector Friedrich Polak from Nordhausen was appointed out as the school inspector. Holungen received a second teacher and a new school was built. In March 1871 land plots on all the farmland were remeasured. Due to the differing altitudes it was possible that there were differences in the measurements, but in 232 cases the permissible difference was exceeded. In 100 cases it amounted to even twice the limit. The owners gave the land over to the Separationsverfahren (roughly, the process of crop rotation) and “had it given back afterwards” (uncertain literal translation of “und ließen es sich hinterher zurückgeben” from German original), as a result of which the total area of farmland was reduced. In 1906, it became apparent that roughly 90 acres / 36 hectares (180 Äcker) of Holungen, which were actually registered in the land registry, were missing. In 1925, the land was recorded twice, one for the forest treasury and the other for the municipality of Weißenborn. Holungen objected, but without any success.

In June 1890, a Church-building Society was founded in Holungen, and one year later the building of the church began. The stones were supplied from the nearby quarry at Wehnberg. A teacher from Holungen began rehearsals of stageplays with the young people from the village and put on performances in neighbouring villages to support the construction of the church. On 20 June 1893, Holungen was consecrated by suffragan bishop (Weihbischof) Dr. Augustinus Gockel. One year later, the registry office was moved from Bischofferode to Holungen. In 1895, the road to Bischofferode was built, with Holungen receiving support from the Landesbauinspektion (roughly State Construction Inspectorate) at Mühlhausen. In 1896, Holungen received a new church organ. One year later, the church tower was hit by lightning, and repairs were still under way when the new church bell was installed, the old bell having cracked during ringing. In 1899, the Holunger Gesangsverein, a singing association, was created. 1908 saw opening of Potash Shaft 1 at the Thomas Müntzer potash mine.

=== Holungen during the two World Wars ===
Holungen was largely unaffected by direct action of the two World Wars. In the First World War, 160 Holungers were conscripted. 36 men did not return home. A memorial was erected in their memory in the church under the tower.

In the Second World War, men from Holungen fought in Poland, France and the Soviet Union, among other places. In total, 47 men from Holungen died during the Second World War. The village itself only felt the effects of the war just before its end. An aerial mine was dropped nearby, and several aircraft shot down by the Luftwaffe. Holungen remained entirely untouched by enemy air attacks. Several inhabitants had to pay fines for not fully blacking out their windows. In spring 1945, German troops were being pushed back, and on 14 March Holungen found itself billeting many soldiers from both Flak and Infantry units, bringing the parish into the war zone. At around 11 o’clock on the night of 9th to 10 April combat erupted. Flak cannon fired at enemy aircraft during a three-hour period, although there were fairly long pauses during that time. Both the inhabitants and buildings of Holungen remained undamaged.

On 11 April the American advance reached Holungen, the German troops having fled the previous day. When the news of the American approach became known, the mayor and the parish vicar went out to meet the approaching troops. As the first vehicles neared them, the two men went up to the Americans and asked them to spare Holungen. They explained that there were no more German soldiers left in the village, and that Holungen would offer no resistance. The inhabitants had hoisted a white flag with a red cross atop the church tower.

American troop movements continued through the area until 18 April, with the tank columns taking the first three days to pass through. The inhabitants could only use the main street between noon and 1 p.m. each day, and all the streets in the village were torn up by tank tracks. On 4 July 1945, Russian soldiers arrived in Holungen, the village lying only 10 km (6.2 mi) from the border with the British occupation zone (see this page about the GDR for a map of the zones). On 20 August the majority of the Russian troops withdrew and only a small garrison remained.

=== East Germany, Reunificiation and the mines ===
Thanks to the strongly held Catholic faith in the Eichsfeld, particularly in Holungen, the SED found it difficult to get a foothold in the area. Nevertheless, the GDR controlled everything. The situation was made worse by the proximity of Holungen to the Grenzsperrgebiet, the closed military exclusion zone that ran along the East German side of the border with the West. The neighbouring villages of Brehme and Jützenbach were located within this zone. This zone, part of a complex border system which extended several kilometres into the GDR, was intended to catch people trying to escape across the border to the West before they reached the actual border fences. Tourists were not permitted entry. Only those who lived in the zone or were visiting relatives in the zone, and had the necessary permits, could enter, making life additionally difficult for the many Holungers with friends and relatives living in the zone.

In the GDR period, the potash mine, now known as the “Thomas Müntzer” mine, was the largest employer in the region. From 1955 to 1961 the number of employees rose from 25 to nearly 300. Even in 1939, the mine had been the main potash source for the German war effort and was considered to be “Rüstungsindustriestufe SS” (“Armaments Industry – SS level”). It was the only mine delivering 98 to 99% by weight potassium chloride at the highest purity grade. These salts were used to produce explosives and other compounds important for the war effort. In 1977, the potassium salt was granted the “K1 price supplement” due to its consistent quality, receiving the “Q” quality mark two years later. From 1985 onwards the mine was the sole supplier of car seat position adjusters for the Wartburg. The mine also produced skylights and artificial fertiliser. In 1993, the mining company was closed. The closing of mine shafts resulted in nationwide attention for the potash miners, who took part in a lot of industrial action (Hunger strikes and a march to Berlin) under the slogan “Bischofferode ist überall” (“Bischofferode is everywhere”). Mining was of great importance for the neighbouring villages and created over 1,000 jobs. The economy of the region was slow to recover from this shock. Even though the mine was better-known in connection with Bischofferode, a large part of the operation was located in Holungen.

In Holungen after the “Wende” (Reunification), several streets were renovated. Many households got a telephone connection, mains gas, etc. In 1995 the second Eichfeld “Trachtenfest” (festival at which traditional costume is worn) was celebrated in Holungen. This festival resulted in various improvements to the village, for example the square around the pond and the fire station was redesigned.

== Population ==
In 1900, Holungen numbered 671 people in 104 households. Each household had, on average, 5 to 7 people. Up to the start of the First World War, the number of inhabitants rose slowly. After the war, the increase continued as many people sought refuge in Holungen. From 1925 to 1940 the population declined. During the Second World War, many evacuees arrived, and so in 1945 the population exceeded a thousand for the first time, reaching 1,092 residents. In 1947, the population reached 1,332, which still stands as the highest-ever number today. After this time the total population decreased again slowly. In 1964, there were 1,080 people in 315 families. The number of extended families decreased ever more quickly. In 1978, the population was again below a thousand, rising above this again in 1983. In the Reunification year of 1990, it lay at 948, thereafter fluctuating around 1,000. In 2001 the number was 991, and at the start of 2003 only 978.

=== Population Data ===
Changes in population (31 December):

- 1994 – 1,004
- 1995 – 1,017
- 1996 – 997
- 1997 – 1,005
- 1998 – 1,002
- 1999 – 990
- 2000 – 998
- 2001 – 991
- 2002 – 978
- 2003 – 969
- 2004 – 949

Source: Thuringia State Office for Statistics

== People ==
Holungen-born:

- Dr. Hermann Iseke (1856–1907) poet of the “Eichsfelder Sang” and other works.
- Anton Thraen (1843–1903) gave names to minor planets including 442 Eichsfeldia and 443 Photographia

== Associations ==
The largest associations in Holungen are the Male Singers’ Society Einigkeit (Unity), the Church Choir Sankt Cäcilia (St Cecilia) the Local History Society Dr. Hermann Iseke Holungen, the Thomas-Müntzer-Kaliverein Bischofferode e.V. (Thomas Müntzer Potash Association of Bischofferode [Registered Charity]) and the Sports Association Blau-Weiß Holungen (Holungen Blue-and-White). Several traditions date back to the 19th century.

The Sports Association has had some success at faustball, the women's team having been GDR Champions twice, although faustball is no longer played in Holungen. The men's football team plays in Thüringen 2. Kreisklassen (Kreis Eichsfeld), Staffel 1 (Thuringia 2nd District classification (Eichsfeld district), group 1). Here, too, past youth teams have had some success (District Champions, District Cup Winners, District Indoor Football Champions). Thanks to several year groups being under-represented in the village, Holungen is currently arranging Spielgemeinschaften (joint teams) with other villages (JSG Bodetal: Bode Valley Youth Joint Team).

In 1864 the Holungen Shooting Club was founded, although after the two World Wars a refounding wasn't permitted. In spite of this, Holungen still has its shooting range. A similar situation holds for the amateur dramatics group, which had been known throughout the region – despite putting on a few performances after Reunification, it eventually folded.
