= Flinsberg =

Coordinates: 51.3172°N 10.1911°E

Flinsberg is a suburb of Heilbad Heiligenstadt, district of Eichsfeld, Thuringia, Germany.

Flinsberg is the geographical centre of Germany.
