= Leinetal =

Municipal association in Thuringia, Germany

- Verwaltungsgemeinschaft
- Map of Eichsfeld highlighting Leinetal
- Interactive map of Leinetal
- Location within Germany Location within Thuringia
- Coordinates: 51°24′N 10°12′E
- Country: Germany
- State: Thuringia
- District: Eichsfeld
- Seat: Bodenrode-Westhausen
- Subdivisions: 6 municipalities

Area
  - Total: 68.25 km^{2} (26.35 sq mi)

Population (2025-12-31)
  - Total: 5,104
  - Density: 74.78/km^{2} (193.7/sq mi)
- Time zone: UTC+01:00 (CET)
  - Summer (DST): UTC+02:00 (CEST)
- Website: vg-leinetal.de

Leinetal is a Verwaltungsgemeinschaft ("collective municipality") in the district Eichsfeld, in Thuringia, Germany. The seat of the Verwaltungsgemeinschaft is in Bodenrode-Westhausen. Its name refers to the valley of the river Leine.

The Verwaltungsgemeinschaft Leinetal consists of the following municipalities:

- Bodenrode-Westhausen
- Geisleden
- Heuthen
- Reinholterode
- Steinbach
- Wingerode
