= Sonnenstein, Thuringia =

Sonnenstein
- Municipality
- Coat of arms

- Location of Sonnenstein within Eichsfeld district
- Interactive map of Sonnenstein
- Location within Germany Location within Thuringia
- Coordinates: 51°32′N 10°25′E
- Country: Germany
- State: Thuringia
- District: Eichsfeld

Government
  - Mayor (2024–30): Margit Ertmer

Area
  - Total: 94.69 km^{2} (36.56 sq mi)
- Elevation: 240 m (790 ft)

Population (2025-12-31)
  - Total: 4,215
  - Density: 44.51/km^{2} (115.3/sq mi)
- Time zone: UTC+01:00 (CET)
  - Summer (DST): UTC+02:00 (CEST)
- Postal codes: 37345
- Dialling codes: 036072
- Vehicle registration: EIC
- Website: www.gemeinde-sonnenstein.de

Sonnenstein (German pronunciation: [ˈzɔnənʃtaɪn]) is a municipality in the district of Eichsfeld, Thuringia, Germany. It was formed by the merger of the previously independent municipalities Bockelnhagen, Holungen, Jützenbach, Silkerode, Steinrode, Stöckey, Weißenborn-Lüderode and Zwinge, on 1 December 2011. These municipalities had previously been part of the Verwaltungsgemeinschaft Eichsfeld-Südharz, which was disbanded. The seat of the municipality is in the village Weißenborn-Lüderode. The municipality consists of 8 Ortschaften (municipal divisions): Bockelnhagen (villages Bockelnhagen and Weilrode), Holungen, Jützenbach, Silkerode, Steinrode (villages Werningerode and Epschenrode), Stöckey, Weißenborn-Lüderode and Zwinge.
