= Hohes Kreuz =

- Ortsteil of Heilbad Heiligenstadt
- Coat of arms
- Interactive map of Hohes Kreuz
- Location within Germany Location within Thuringia
- Coordinates: 51°25′31″N 10°5′36″E
- Country: Germany
- State: Thuringia
- District: Eichsfeld
- Town: Heilbad Heiligenstadt

Area
  - Total: 18.01 km^{2} (6.95 sq mi)
- Elevation: 347 m (1,138 ft)

Population (2022-12-31)
  - Total: 1,303
  - Density: 72.35/km^{2} (187.4/sq mi)
- Time zone: UTC+01:00 (CET)
  - Summer (DST): UTC+02:00 (CEST)
- Postal codes: 37308
- Dialling codes: 03606

Hohes Kreuz (German pronunciation: [ˈhoːəs ˈkʁɔʏts], lit. 'High Cross', named after the hill with the same name) is a former municipality in the Eichsfeld in Thuringia, Germany. The municipality was created in 1991 by merging the municipalities of Bischhagen, Mengelrode, Siemerode, and Streitholz. On 1 January 2024 it became part of the town Heilbad Heiligenstadt.
