= Adelebsen =

Place in Lower Saxony, Germany

- Municipality
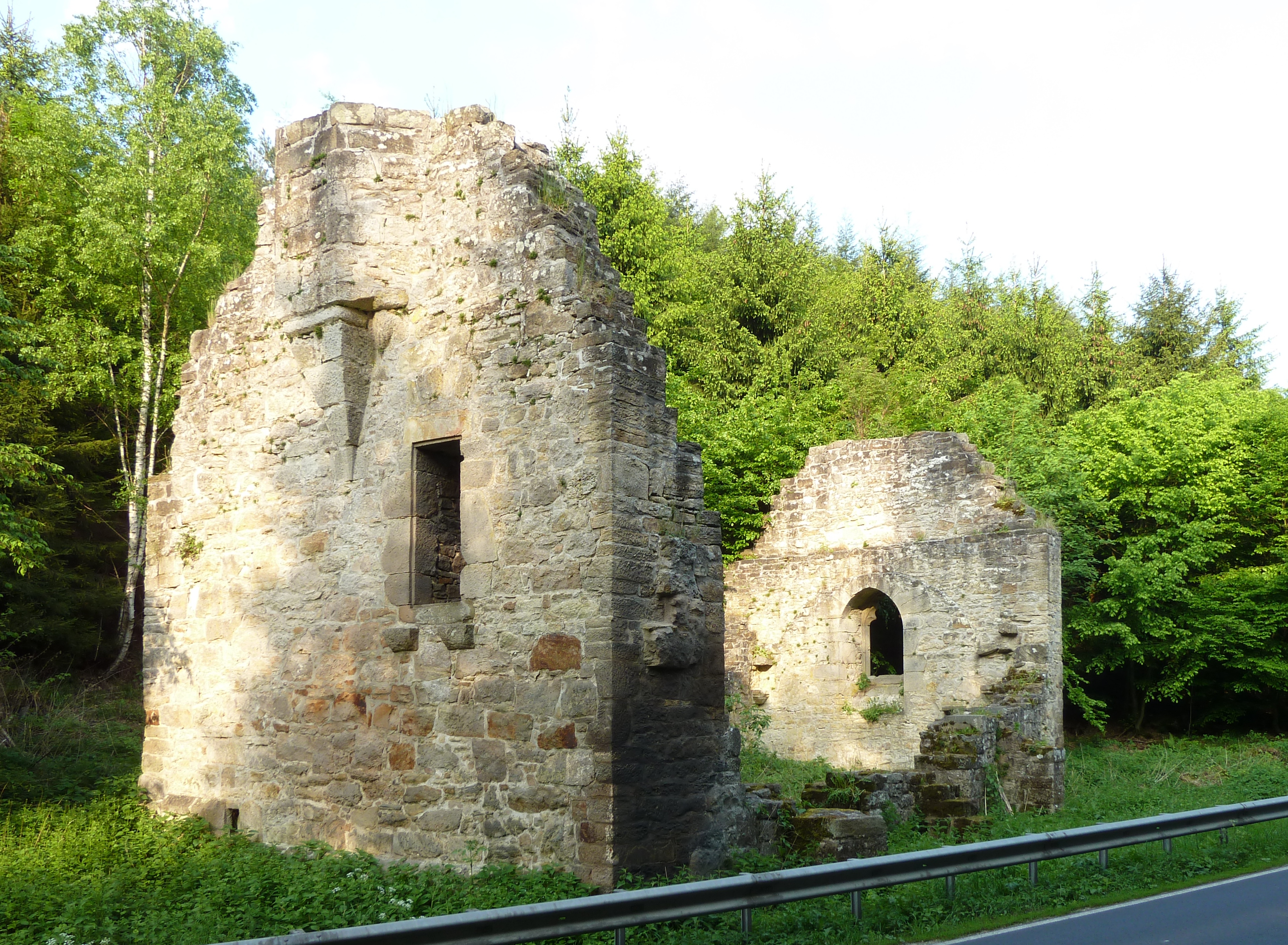
- Ruins of the late-Gothic chapel of St. Mary, near Reynhardeshagen, west of Adelebsen.

- Flag Coat of arms

- Location of Adelebsen within Göttingen district
- Interactive map of Adelebsen
- Location within Germany Location within Lower Saxony
- Coordinates: 51°34′48″N 9°45′16″E
- Country: Germany
- State: Lower Saxony
- District: Göttingen

Government
  - Mayor (2021–26): Holger Frase (SPD)

Area
  - Total: 75.85 km^{2} (29.29 sq mi)
- Elevation: 187 m (614 ft)

Population (2025-12-31)
  - Total: 6,100
  - Density: 80/km^{2} (210/sq mi)
- Time zone: UTC+01:00 (CET)
  - Summer (DST): UTC+02:00 (CEST)
- Postal codes: 37139
- Dialling codes: 05506; 05502 (Güntersen)
- Vehicle registration: GÖ, DUD, HMÜ
- Website: www.adelebsen.de

Adelebsen is a municipality in the district of Göttingen, in Lower Saxony, Germany. It consists of the localities Adelebsen, Barterode, Eberhausen, Erbsen, Güntersen, Lödingsen and Wibbecke. The Burg Adelebsen is located on a high point in Adelebsen proper.

Ernst Gräfenberg, a medical doctor, who first described the g-spot was born here.

== History ==
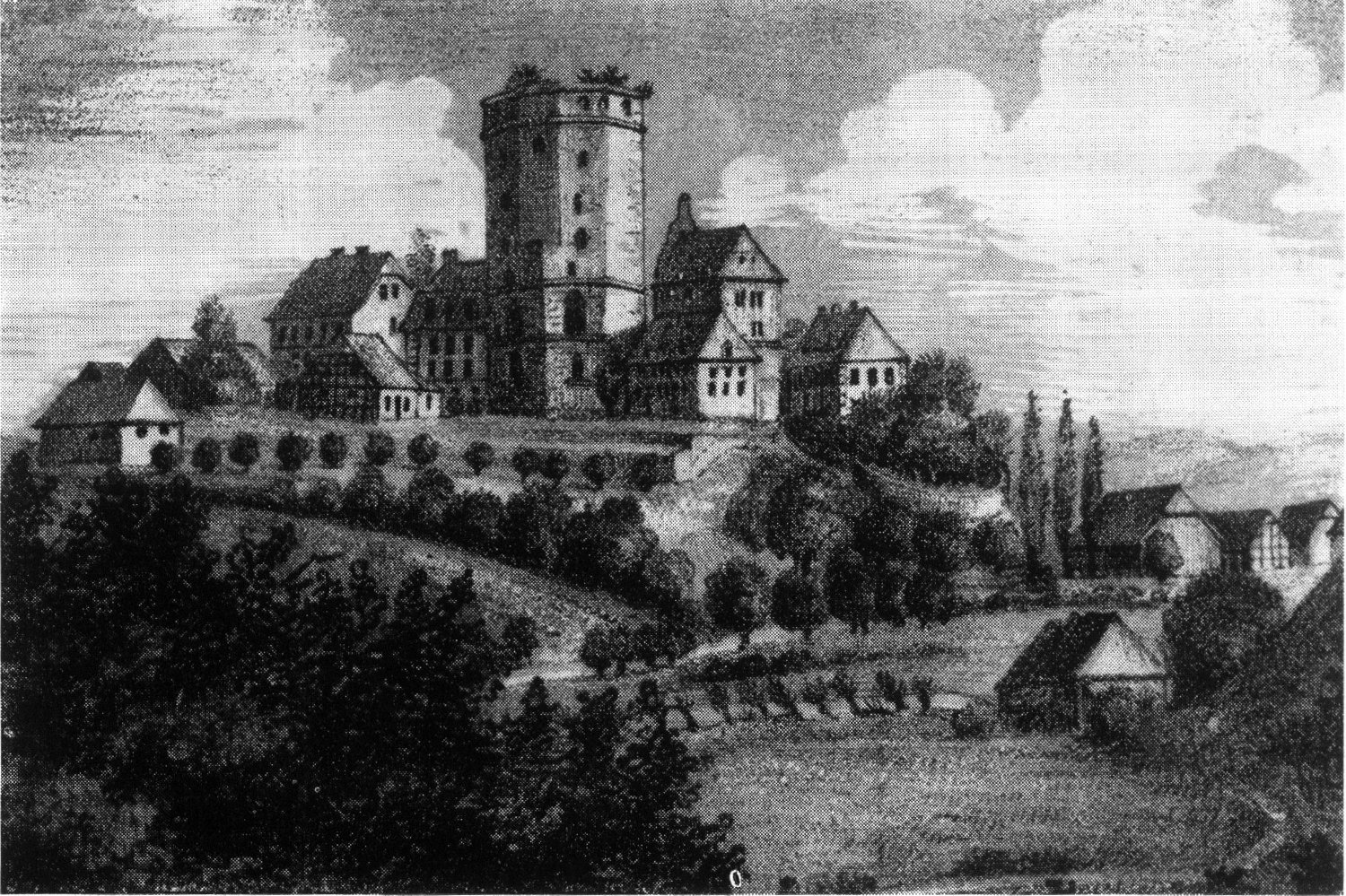
Burg Adelebsen in a 19th-century rendering

The locality is first documented in 990 under the name "Ethelleveshusen," in the context of a gift of land from Emperor Otto III to his sister Sophia. The noble family von Wichbike (of Wibbecke) moved their seat to Adelebsen in 1234, and built a castle upon the sandstone promontory there. The castle – Burg Adelebsen – is first documented in 1295, and the family from then on were known as von Adelebsen, after the place.

From the 14th century until the mid 19th century the noble lords von Adelebsen maintained a patrimonial court (Patrimonialgericht) at Adelebsen. The lords of Adelebsen issued a judicial code (Gerichtsordnung) in 1543, and an administrative ordinance (Polizeiordnung) in 1550, providing the basis of legal procedure and administrative regulations within their jurisdiction, as well as the extraction of fines for violations. They drew their income primarily from taxation, fines, and licensing fees with respect to businesses such as brewing, the running of inns or taverns, and the exercise of trades and certain crafts. In 1859, under the administration of the Kingdom of Hanover, the patrimonial court's jurisdiction was subsumed under the newly established royal government office at nearby Uslar. In 1866 Hanover became part of the Kingdom of Prussia, under which it was known as the Province of Hanover.

Adelebsen and the castle were partly burned down in 1466 by Ernst I of Schauenburg, Bishop of Hildesheim, during a regional feud. Originally erected as a fortress, the castle was rebuilt in 1596 with an impressive façade and numerous large rooms with windows, suitable to serve as a noble residence.

The town and castle were again mostly destroyed during the Thirty Years' War. The castle was rebuilt by 1650; and in 1740 it was renovated and expanded in the style of a Baroque palace.

The Jewish community of Adelebsen had its beginnings in the late 17th century, with the first documented Jewish family appearing in a tax list of 1675. In 1796 there were 20 Jewish families in the town. By the 19th century, the Jewish community had grown to be one of the largest in the region. In 1848, 149 Jewish residents comprised 13% of the town's total population. But the size of the community declined steadily in the late 19th to early 20th century, so that by 1925 there were only 46 Jews living in Adelebsen, making up 3% of the population. During the Nazi regime, the community was destroyed by deportation, immigration and killings. The local synagogue was destroyed during Kristallnacht, the night of 9–10 November 1938, by SS members from Göttingen, joined by local SS members of Adelebsen.

== Twin towns ==
Adelebsen is twinned with:

- Wieluń, Poland
