= Wingerode =

- Municipality
- Coat of arms

- Location of Wingerode within Eichsfeld district
- Interactive map of Wingerode
- Location within Germany Location within Thuringia
- Coordinates: 51°23′26″N 10°14′27″E
- Country: Germany
- State: Thuringia
- District: Eichsfeld
- Municipal assoc.: Leinetal

Government
  - Mayor (2022–28): Erhardt Wehr

Area
  - Total: 9.77 km^{2} (3.77 sq mi)
- Elevation: 310 m (1,020 ft)

Population (2025-12-31)
  - Total: 1,091
  - Density: 112/km^{2} (289/sq mi)
- Time zone: UTC+01:00 (CET)
  - Summer (DST): UTC+02:00 (CEST)
- Postal codes: 37327
- Dialling codes: 03605
- Vehicle registration: EIC
- Website: www.vg-leinetal.de

Wingerode is a municipality in the district of Eichsfeld in Thuringia, Germany. In 1996, Wingerode celebrated its 850th anniversary. It was founded in 1146.

In 1174 Henry the Lion, Duke of Bavaria and Saxony, bought the village from Volkenroda Abbey. Since the 17th century, the local Ignatius chapel has been the object of pilgrimages. Wingerode belonged to the Electorate of Mainz until the secularization of 1802 and was subject to the jurisdiction of the von Hanstein family. From 1802 to 1807, the village was Prussian, and then it came to the Kingdom of Westphalia. From 1815 to 1945 it was part of the Prussian Province of Saxony. At the end of World War II, it was in the Soviet occupation zone and in 1949 became part of East Germany. From 1961 until reunification in 1990, Wingerode was affected by the closure of the nearby inner German border. Since 1990, the municipality is part of the re-established state of Thuringia.
