= Heilbad Heiligenstadt =

- Town
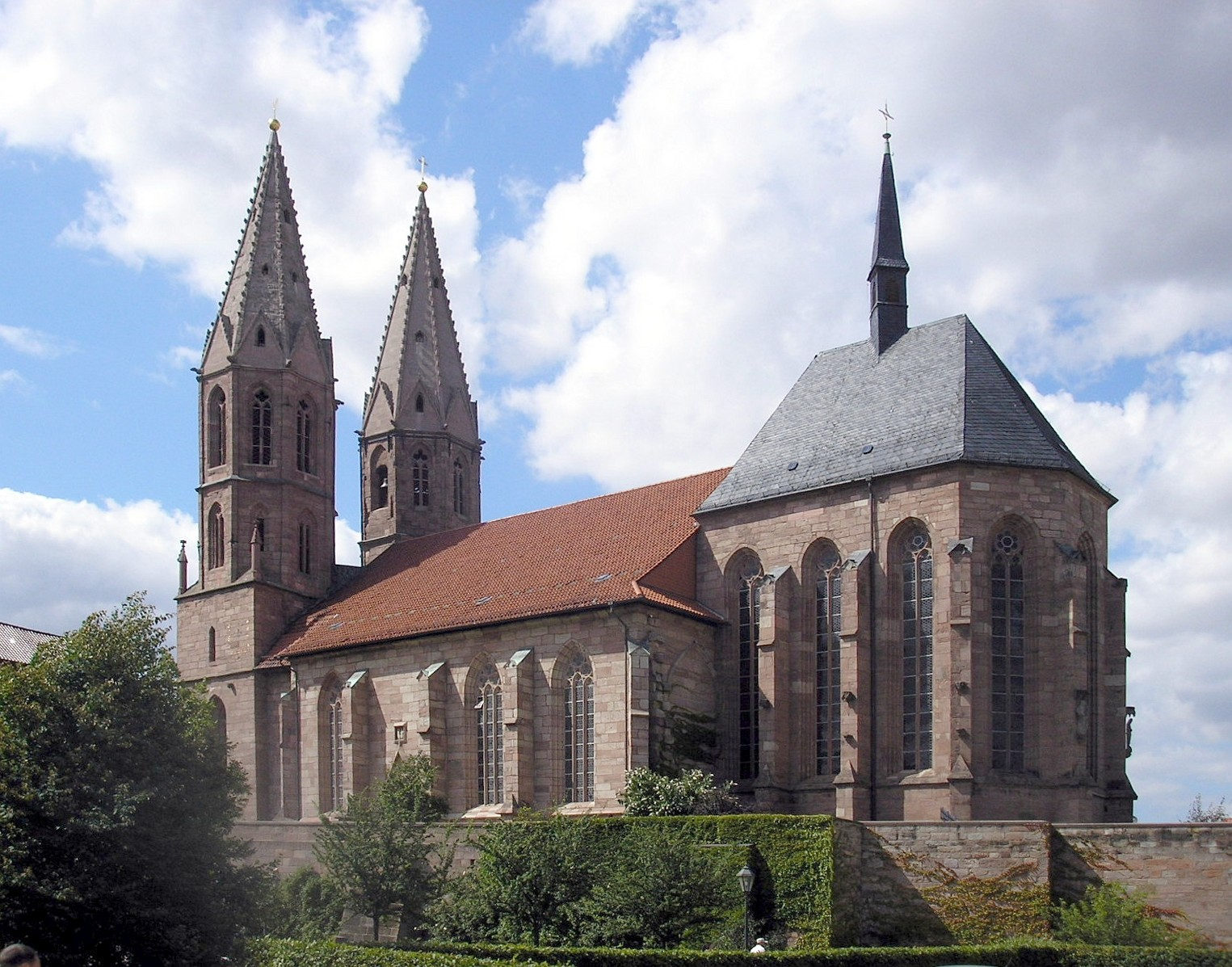
- Saint Mary's Church, 14th century

- Coat of arms

- Location of Heilbad Heiligenstadt within Eichsfeld district
- Interactive map of Heilbad Heiligenstadt
- Location within Germany Location within Thuringia
- Coordinates: 51°22′44″N 10°08′19″E
- Country: Germany
- State: Thuringia
- District: Eichsfeld

Government
  - Mayor (2024–30): Thomas Spielmann

Area
  - Total: 91.49 km^{2} (35.32 sq mi)
- Elevation: 255 m (837 ft)

Population (2025-12-31)
  - Total: 18,230
  - Density: 199.3/km^{2} (516.1/sq mi)
- Time zone: UTC+01:00 (CET)
  - Summer (DST): UTC+02:00 (CEST)
- Postal codes: 37308
- Dialling codes: 03606
- Vehicle registration: EIC, HIG, WBS
- Website: www.heilbad-heiligenstadt.de

Heilbad Heiligenstadt (German pronunciation: [ˈhaɪlˌbaːt ˈhaɪlɪɡn̩ˌʃtat]) is a spa town in Thuringia, Germany. It is the capital of the Eichsfeld district.

== Geography ==
Heiligenstadt is approximately 14 km east of the tripoint where the states of Thuringia, Hesse and Lower Saxony meet. It lies on the upper course of the river Leine (a tributary of the Aller) that flows through the town from east to west and is joined near the centre of the town by the Geislede.

South of the town is the Iberg, a 453.2 m tall peak located in the Heiligenstadt Stadtwald, which forms part of the Naturpark Eichsfeld-Hainich-Werratal.

=== Local subdivisions ===
The municipality of Heilbad Heiligenstadt consists of the central town and the following villages (Ortsteile):

- Bernterode
- Flinsberg, the geographical centre of Germany.
- Glasehausen
- Günterode
- Hohes Kreuz
- Kalteneber
- Rengelrode

== History ==
- Heiligenstadt was first mentioned in 973.
- In 1022 it was acquired by the archbishop of Mainz.
- In 1227, the town received town rights from the archbishop of Mainz.
- In 1333 it was destroyed by fire.
- In 1525 it was captured by Henry the Middle, Duke of Brunswick-Lüneburg.
- In 1540 Heiligenstadt became the capital of Eichsfeld.
- In 1581 a Jesuit college was established, operating until 1773.
- In the Thirty Years' War of 1618–1648, the city was devastated several times.
- In 1803 it came into possession of Prussia.
- In 1929 the salt-water hydropathic baths were built and in 1950 the town was designated a spa.
- On 9 November 1938, the town synagogue was desecrated. The event is commemorated in a plaque on the building, which is now a residence.
- In October 1989, demonstrations began in Heiligenstadt as part of the Peaceful Revolution in East Germany.
- In 1994, Heiligenstadt became the capital of the new district of Eichsfeld, formed by the amalgamation of the districts of Heiligenstadt and Worbis.

=== Historical Population ===
Population (31 December):

- 1825: 4,637
- 1875: 5,193
- 1890: 6,183
- 1910: 8,229
- 1925: 8,641
- 1939: 9,973
- 1950: 12,444
- 1960: 12,500
- 1971: 13,646
- 1981: 15,524
- 1988: 16,527
- 1994: 17,379
- 1995: 17,239
- 1996: 17,170
- 1997: 17,133
- 1998: 17,077
- 1999: 17,126
- 2000: 17,291
- 2001: 17,392
- 2002: 17,283
- 2003: 17,260
- 2004: 17,151
- 2005: 17,153
- 2006: 17,103
- 2007: 17,032
- 2008: 16,856
- 2009: 16,765
- 2010: 16,610
- 2011: 16,310
- 2012: 16,188
- 2013: 16,197
- 2014: 16,337
- 2015: 16,772

Data since 1994: Thüringian state office of statistics

=== Name of the town ===
Despite the official designation of the town as a spa in 1929 and a 1950 decision by the town council to append the word Soleheilbad (salt-water spa) to its name, it remained officially "Heiligenstadt" (literally Holy City) during the East German years. In 1990 the city government still used only Heiligenstadt.

However, the post office used Heilbad Heiligenstadt, as did postcard companies and the local savings bank. In fact between 1950 and 1990, the town had the distinction of being referred to in three different ways: as Heiligenstadt, Heilbad Heiligenstadt, or Heiligenstadt (Eichsf.) (for Eichsfeld).

In 1990, the town council and especially the mayor began expanding the spa business and it took on increasing importance. In addition, after German reunification, there were several Heiligenstadts in Germany. Initially the government declined to rename the town Heilbad Heiligenstadt because of a lack of evidence that it was a spa, but the town lodged an appeal and used the one and a half years before an official visit and the relative lack of oversight immediately after reunification to create spa facilities and integrate the word Heilbad into official usage. Permission for the renaming was then granted since the town was evidently a spa and using that name.

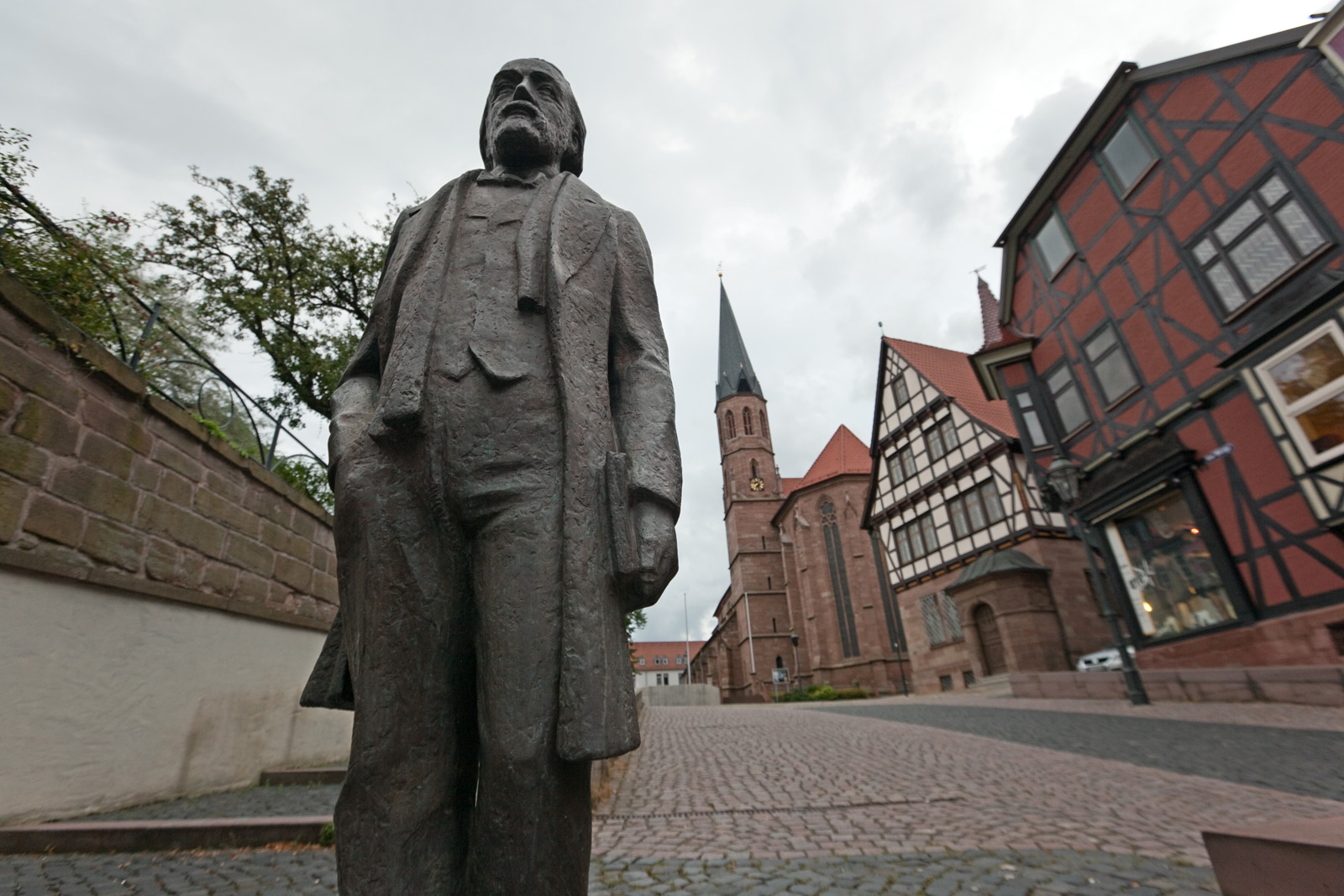
Statue of Theodor Storm in front of the Storm Literary Museum

== Culture and sights ==
=== Theatre ===
- Eichsfeld Kulturhaus

=== Museums ===
- Theodor Storm Literary Museum
- Eichsfeld Heimatmuseum (local history collection)
- Heiligenstadt (Ost) Station Museum
- The Borderland Museum Eichsfeld is located a few miles outside the city of Heiligenstadt and deals with the inner-German border and the history of the GDR

=== Buildings and monuments ===
- Mainz Schloss, seat of the administrator for Eichsfeld when it was a dominion of the Archbishopric of Mainz
- Klausmühle (1748 Fachwerk mill on the site of the birthplace of Tilman Riemenschneider)
- Einheitsdenkmal German Unity Monument in front of the town administration building, 2009

==== Churches and chapels ====
- St. Aegidius, also known as the Neustädter Kirche (new-town church): begun in the 13th century
- St. Mary's, also known as the Altstädter Kirche (old-town church), Liebfrauenkirche (Our Lady's) and Propsteikirche (abbey church): a 14th-century monastic foundation which replaced a 13th-century Romanesque building
- St. Anne's chapel, possibly built as an ossuary, facing the north portico of St. Mary's
- St. Martin's, also known as the Bergkirche (mountain church)
- Monastery of the Congregation of the Most Holy Redeemer and St. Gerhard's church, also known as the Paterkloster
- St. Nicholas', also known as the Klausbergkirche
- Klöppelsklus
- Convent of the Sisters of Mary Magdalene Postel, with convent church and school church

=== Cemeteries ===
- The Jewish cemetery in Ibergstraße was last used for burial in 1940. The deportation of six Jewish residents to Theresienstadt concentration camp in September 1942 put an end to a Jewish community in the town which was first mentioned in writing in 1212 and which had built a synagogue and their own school in the 19th century.
- The Soviet cemetery and monument in Dingelstädter Straße commemorate 70 Soviet prisoners of war and impressed workers who died in the town due to forced labour during World War II.

=== Parks ===
- Heinrich Heine Kurpark (spa park)

=== Regular events ===
Heiligenstadt, like the rest of Eichsfeld, is traditionally Roman Catholic, so there are several annual religious events, in particular the procession through the old town on Palm Sunday with life-size figures from the Passion of Christ, which attracts numerous believers from the region and the rest of Germany.

==== Ibergrennen ====
The Ibergrennen is an annual road race held since 1994 on the last weekend in June on Landesstraße 2022 (Holzweg) in the western foothills of the Iberg. Sponsored by the German Mountain Cup and German Mountain Championship, it has included sports and touring cars since 1998, when the road surface was renewed and the barriers reinforced. In 2000, the course was extended from 1.96 km to 2.05 km. The climb remains 200 m. It is thus one of the shortest mountain race routes in Germany, but not without challenges.

The drivers' encampment is traditionally set up near the centre of Heiligenstadt, next to a filling station and a supermarket which is open on Sundays.

The first race was held in 1925, but only for motorcycles.

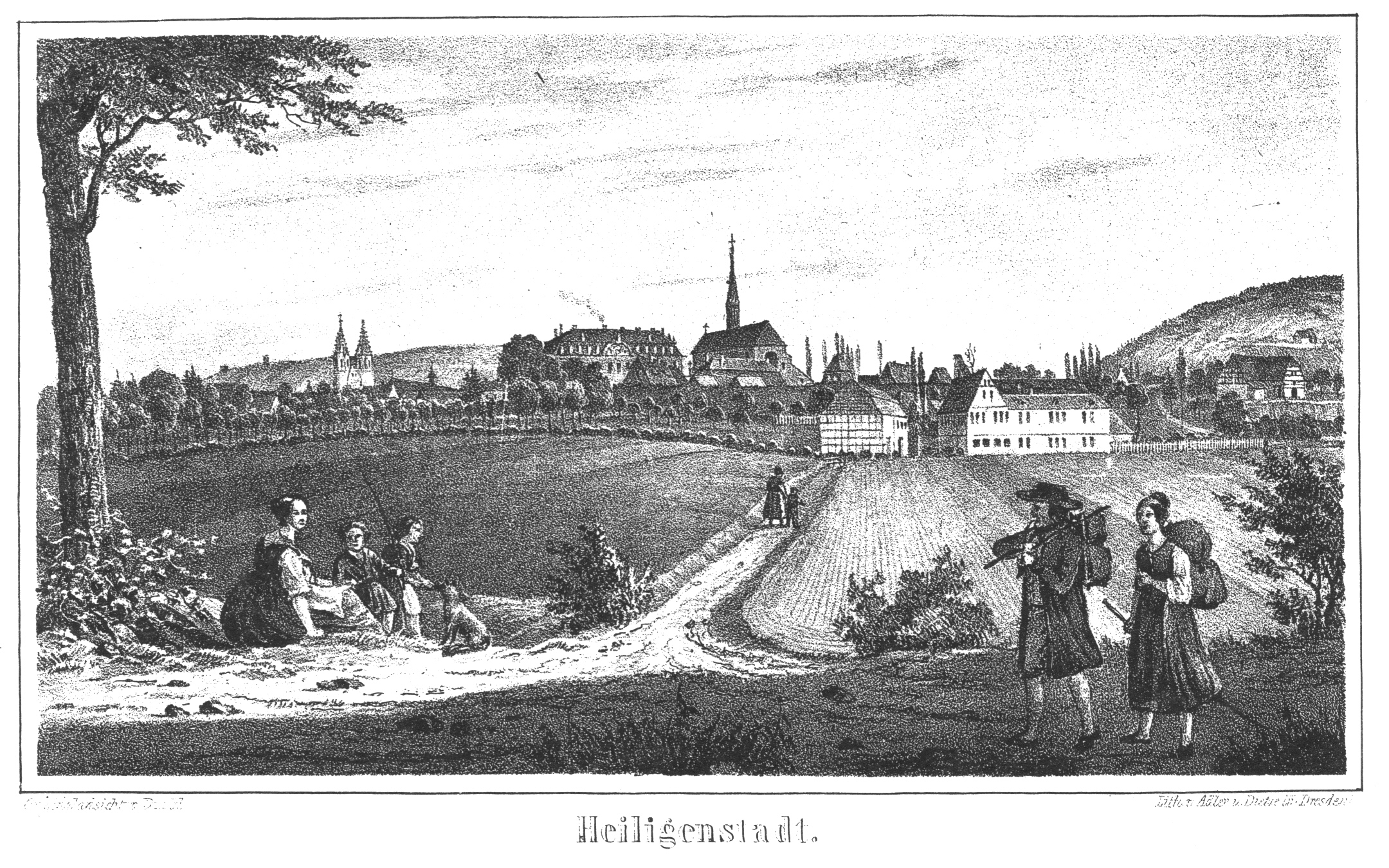
Heiligenstadt around 1840, by Carl Duval

== People associated with Heilbad Heiligenstadt ==
=== Honorary citizens ===
- Johann Vinzenz Wolf (1743–1826), Jesuit historian
- 1991: Hugo Dornhofer, Christian labour union official and CDU politician

=== Natives ===
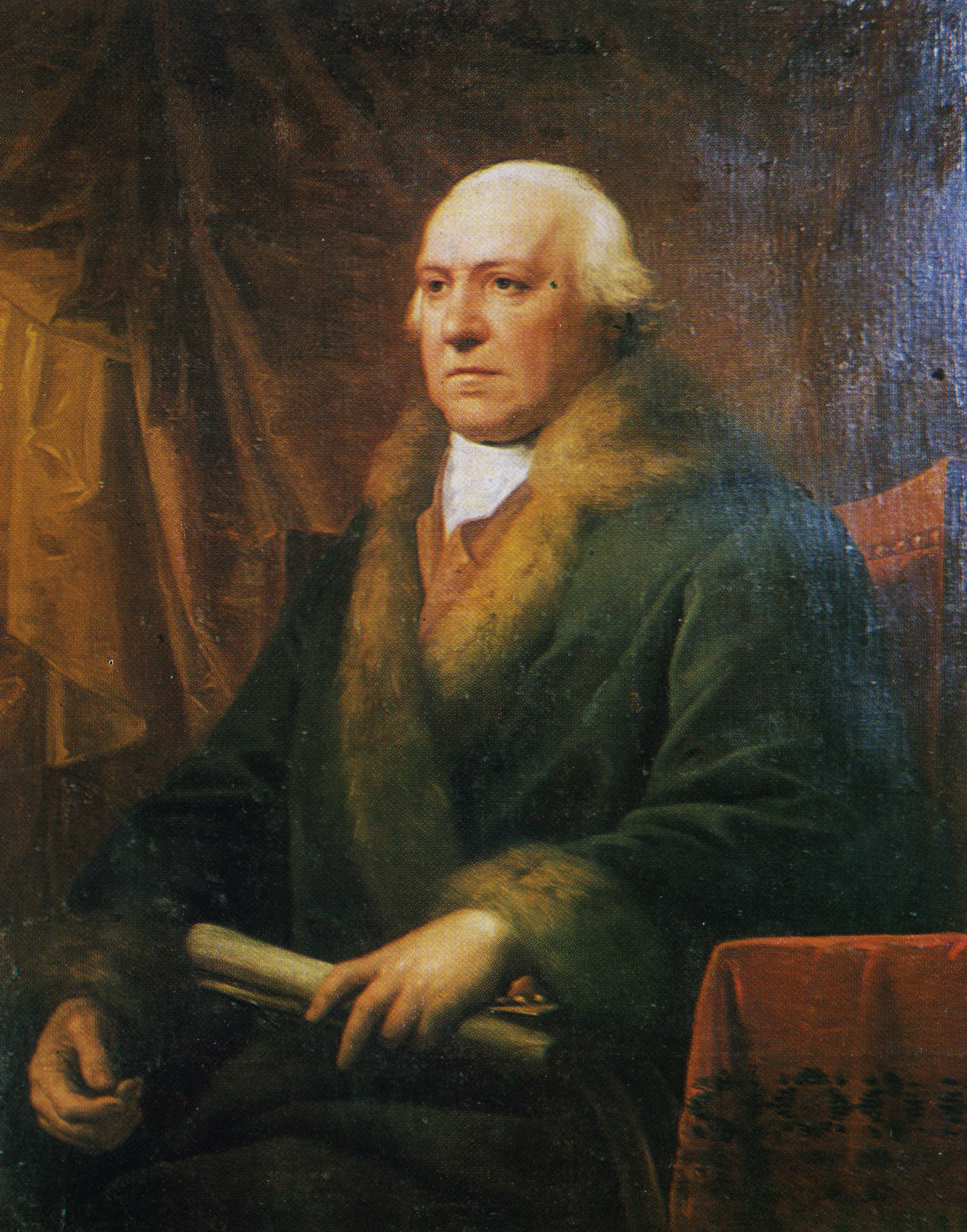
Johann Melchior Birkenstock

- Tilman Riemenschneider (c. 1460–1531), sculptor
- Johann Melchior Birkenstock (1738–1809), Austrian politician and school reformer
- Josepha von Siebold (1771–1849), gynaecologist, the first credentialled midwife in Germany.
- Eduard Strecker (1822–1894), politician
- Ludwig Loewe (1837–1886), politician
- Helene Keßler (1870–1957), writer, under the pseudonym Hans von Kahlenberg
- Siegfried Loewenthal (1874–1951), chief justice in West Berlin 1945–1951, honorary citizen of Heiligenstadt 1948–1951
- Horst Sannemüller (1918–2001), violinist and leader of the Leipzig Gewandhaus Orchestra
- Wilhelm Friese (1924–2008), professor of Scandinavian studies
- Karl-Hermann Steinberg (1941-2021), chemist and politician
- Wolfgang Thüne (born 1949), Olympic medallist in gymnastics
- Joachim Knape (born 1950), professor of rhetoric
- Bernhard Germeshausen (born 1951), Olympic medallist in bobsleigh
- Dietrich Klinge (born 1954), sculptor and graphic designer
- Angelika Weiz (born 1954), singer
- Dieter Althaus (born 1958), politician (CDU) Ministerpresident of Thuringia 2003–09
- Peter Pysall (born 1960), handball player and coach
- Sebastian Haupt (born 1985), skeleton racer

=== Others ===
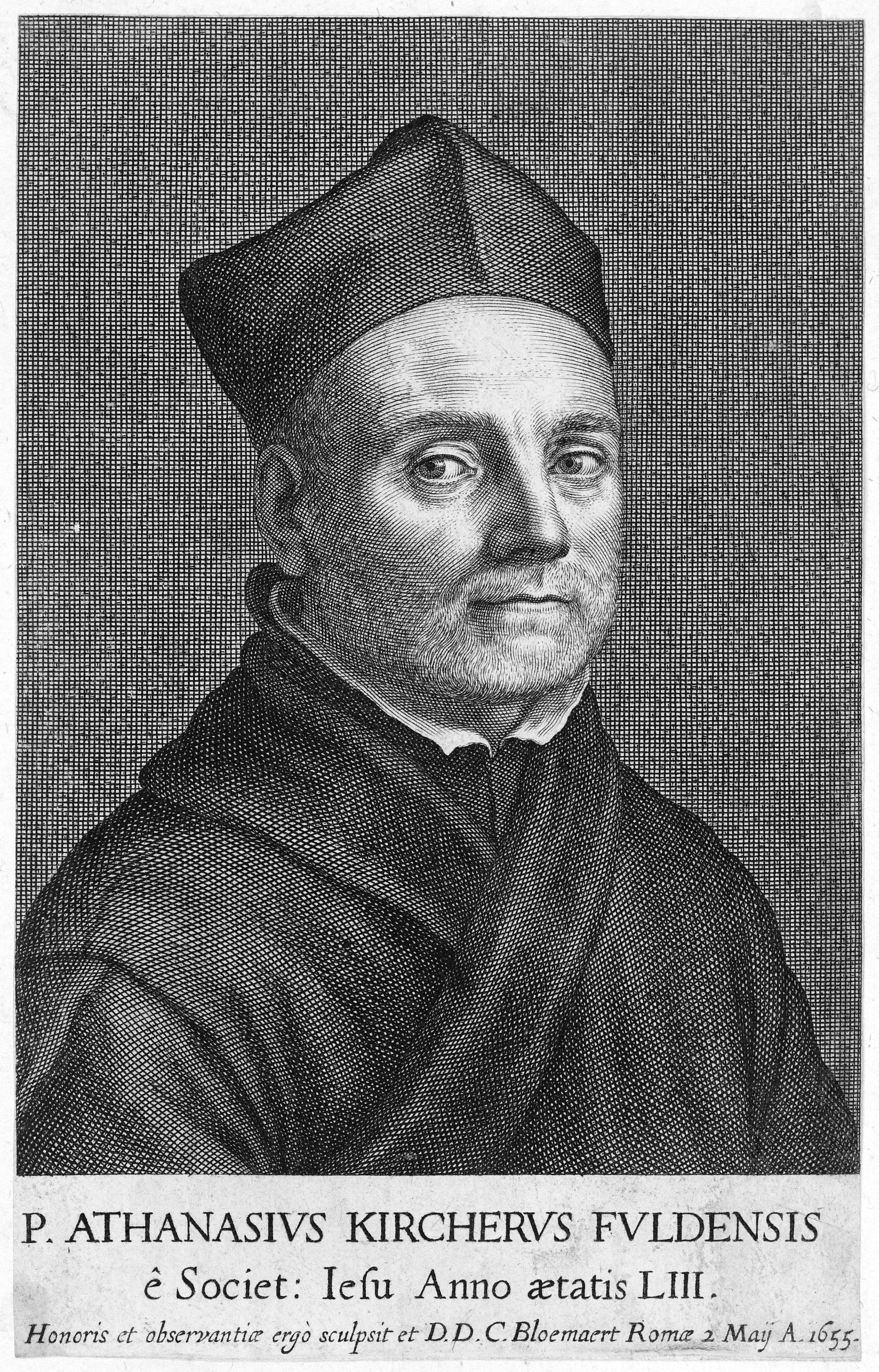
Athanasius Kircher in 1665

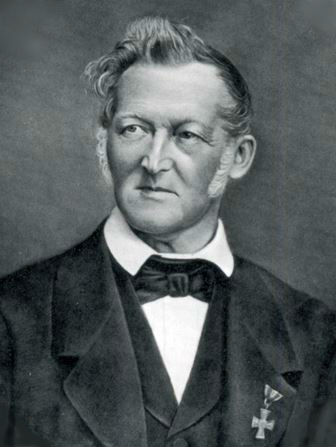
Johann Carl Fuhlrott

- Saint Aureus of Mainz (5th century), Bishop of Mainz: some of his remains were reinterred in Heiligenstadt and he is the patron saint of the town.
- Burchard of Worms (c. 965–20 August 1025), consecrated Bishop of Worms in Heiligenstadt in 1000.
- Adolf I of Nassau (1353–1390), Archbishop of Mainz, died in Heiligenstadt.
- Athanasius Kircher (1602–1680), Jesuit scholar, taught in Heiligenstadt.
- Hadrian Daude (1704–1755), Jesuit theologian, taught in Heiligenstadt.
- Friedrich Christian Adolf von Motz (1775–1830), Prussian statesman, was Director of Finance in Heiligenstadt.
- Heinrich Heine (1797–1856), poet and journalist, was baptised a Protestant in Heiligenstadt in June 1825.
- Johann Carl Fuhlrott (1803–1877), natural historian, taught in Heiligenstadt.
- Heinrich Maria Waldmann (1811–1896), theologian and teacher in Heiligenstadt, a representative in the Frankfurt Parliament of 1848/49.
- Theodor Storm (1817–1888), author, judge in Heiligenstadt from 1856 to 1864.
- Friedrich Wilhelm Grimme (1827–1887), author and botanist, was director of the Catholic gymnasium in Heiligenstadt.
- Werner Hagedorn (1831–1894), surgeon, educated in Heiligenstadt.
- Anton Thraen (1843–1902), astronomer, educated in Heiligenstadt.
- Karl Wisniewski (1844–1904), composer, worked in Heiligenstadt from 1885 on.
- Hermann Iseke (1856–1907), poet
- Andreas Huke (1876–1962), politician, worked and lived in Heiligenstadt.
- Ludolf Hermann Müller (1882–1959), Protestant Bishop of Saxony, had been a minister in Heiligenstadt.
- Karl Paul Haendly (1891–1965), author and politician, died in Heiligenstadt.
- Erich Gerberding (1921–1986), actor, member of the Heiligenstadt theatre.
- Johannes Dyba (1929–2000), Bishop of Fulda, educated in Heiligenstadt.
- Joachim Meisner (1933–2017), Archbishop of Cologne, previously chaplain at St. Egidius' church in Heiligenstadt.
- Georg Sterzinsky (1936–2011), Archbishop of Berlin, previously chaplain at St. Egidius' church in Heiligenstadt.
- Heinz-Josef Durstewitz (born 1945), Catholic dissenter in the GDR, now Provost of Heiligenstadt.
- Reinhard Hauke (born 1953), Auxiliary bishop of Erfurt, previously chaplain at St. Egidius' church in Heiligenstadt.
- Manfred Grund (born 1955), politician, active in Heiligenstadt.

== Sources ==
- Johann Vinzenz Wolf. Geschichte und Beschreibung der Stadt Heiligenstadt mit Urkunden. Göttingen: Beyersche Universitätsdruckerei, 1800. At Google Books
- Hans Patze (Ed.) "Heiligenstadt". In: Thüringen: Handbuch der historischen Stätten Deutschlands, Volume 9. Stuttgart: Alfred-Kröner-Verlag, 1989. ISBN 3-520-31302-2. pp. 186–190.
- Carl Duval. "Heiligenstadt". In: Das Eichsfeld. Repr. Hannover-Dören: Harro von Hirschheydt Verlag, 1979. ISBN 3-7777-0002-9. pp. 422–489.
- Karl J. Hüther. Vom Jesuitenkolleg zum Staatlichen Gymnasium in Heiligenstadt. Heiligenstadt: F.W. Cordier,1995. ISBN 3-929413-25-6.
- Enno Bünz. "Heiligenstadt als geistliches Zentrum des Eichsfeldes. Das Kollegiatstift St. Martin und seine Kanoniker". Zeitschrift des Vereins für Thüringische Geschichte 62 (2008) 9-48.
- Bernhard Opfermann. Gestalten des Eichsfeldes: Ein biographisches Lexikon. Heiligenstadt: Cordier, 1999, ISBN 3-929413-37-X.
