= Hermann Iseke =

German military minister (1856–1907)

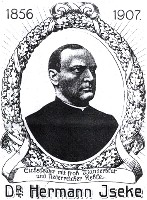
Hermann Iseke

Dr. Hermann Iseke (9 March 1856 in Holungen, Province of Saxony – 14 January 1907 in South West Africa, now Namibia) was a German minister in military service.

== Education ==
He was born on 9 March 1856 in Holungen, in the Prussian Province of Saxony, where he attended the elementary school at that time. He received his first Latin instruction from the Kaplan (chaplain) at that time Andreas Raabe, a well-known language researcher. From 1867 to 1873 he attended a gymnasium in Heiligenstadt and Mühlhausen where in 1874, he successfully passed out. Subsequently, he began studying jurisprudence at the Universities of Würzburg (1873–74), Leipzig (1874–75), Göttingen (1876–78) and Greifswald (1878). Here, he made the first legal state examination, attained a doctorate in Jena to the Dr. jur. and worked as a junior lawyer in Duderstadt and Künzelsau. He then decided upon a change of direction, went to cathedrals and studied philosophy and Germanistik (1879–1880). In 1880, he attended Freiburg, Breslau, now Wrocław and Münster for theology.

== Career ==
In 1892, he joined the military welfare service. As a military minister, he worked in the garrisons of Metz, Hanover and Mühlhausen and in Alsace, later went on a punitive expedition to China from 1900 to 1902, and then he visited the western states of North America. Later he worked again as a military minister in Kassel and Saarbrücken before 1905. In 1907 he went to the Southern Africa area. The unhealthy climate was a big strain and it was hard for an otherwise strong man to cope with the environment. Dr. Hermann Iseke died on 14 January 1907 in Southwest Africa, present-day Namibia, of malaria. His body was transferred in the summer of 1907 to his hometown, Holungen.

== Poet ==
Dr. Hermann Iseke not only work as a pastoral minister (Seelsorger), but also as a poet. These seals gave him an honorary title of: Dichter des Eichsfeldes = poets of Eichsfeld. Probably in the year 1902, he wrote in Eichsfeld admitted Eichsfelder Sang, but this was not his only work. Beside many smaller poems he wrote two larger documents (Der lieben heiligen Elisabeth won Thüringen and under the pseudonym Bernadus Amerikanus out of Eichsfeld in history and legend").

== Honors ==
The city of Heiligenstadt designated a road after himself, in his place of birth, Holungen is honoured Gedenkstein was established and the association for local history carries his name, the Dr. Hermann Iseke Holungen.#
