= Glasehausen =

- Ortsteil of Heilbad Heiligenstadt
- Interactive map of Glasehausen
- Location within Germany Location within Thuringia
- Coordinates: 51°26′28″N 10°9′10″E
- Country: Germany
- State: Thuringia
- District: Eichsfeld
- Town: Heilbad Heiligenstadt

Area
  - Total: 2.61 km^{2} (1.01 sq mi)
- Elevation: 290 m (950 ft)

Population (2022-12-31)
  - Total: 146
  - Density: 55.9/km^{2} (145/sq mi)
- Time zone: UTC+01:00 (CET)
  - Summer (DST): UTC+02:00 (CEST)
- Postal codes: 37308
- Dialling codes: 036085

Glasehausen (German pronunciation: [ɡlaːzəˈhaʊzn̩]) is a village and a former municipality in the district of Eichsfeld in Thuringia, Germany. On 1 January 2024 it became part of the town Heilbad Heiligenstadt.
