= Anton Thraen =

German astronomer (1843–1902)

Anton Karl Thraen (17 January 1843, Holungen, Province of Saxony – 18 February 1902, Dingelstädt) was a German astronomer and named two minor planets, 442 Eichsfeldia and 443 Photographica.

== Biography ==
Thraen was born on 17 January 1843 in Holungen, in the Prussian Province of Saxony, where he attended the elementary school at that time. In 1863, he completed his schooling in Heiligenstadt and went to Westfälische Wilhelms-Universität Münster (1863–66), and the University of Paderborn (1866–68) and learned theology. Already in Munster, he also knew mathematical and astronomical lectures and helped at the observatory.

From 1883 up to his death, he worked as a minister in Dingelstädt. Here, he organised charitable collections for the development of the hospital and the parish church. By night he often observed the sky with his telescope, particularly working on the orbits of comets and minor planets, publishing his results in international technical periodicals.

Despite going blind in his left eye, this work was continued. He observed the short-period Comet III (Wolf) in 1884-85 with 950 observations and in 1891-92 with 681 observations, and calculated its orbit to forecast the third return. Thraen also discovered several new asteroids, which received the name "Eichsfeldia" and the name "Photographica" from Professor Wolf.

Thraen was honoured by the Prussian state in 1900 with the award of the Roten-Adlerordens, IV class. Only in 1902 at a conference in Göttingen did he become personally acquainted with many astronomers, with whom he had previously only been in contact with by post. In August of that year, he fell ill with incurable gastric trouble, and died on 18 December 1902.

Asteroid 4098 Thraen, discovered by Dr. Börngen of the Karl Schwarzschild Observatory in Tautenberg in 1987 is named for the Dingelstädter minister and astronomer. At his parents' house in Holungen in 1956, a plaque was attached in his memory. The city of Dingelstädt has a street named after Thraen.
