= Friedrich Wilhelm Grimme =

German writer (1827–1887)

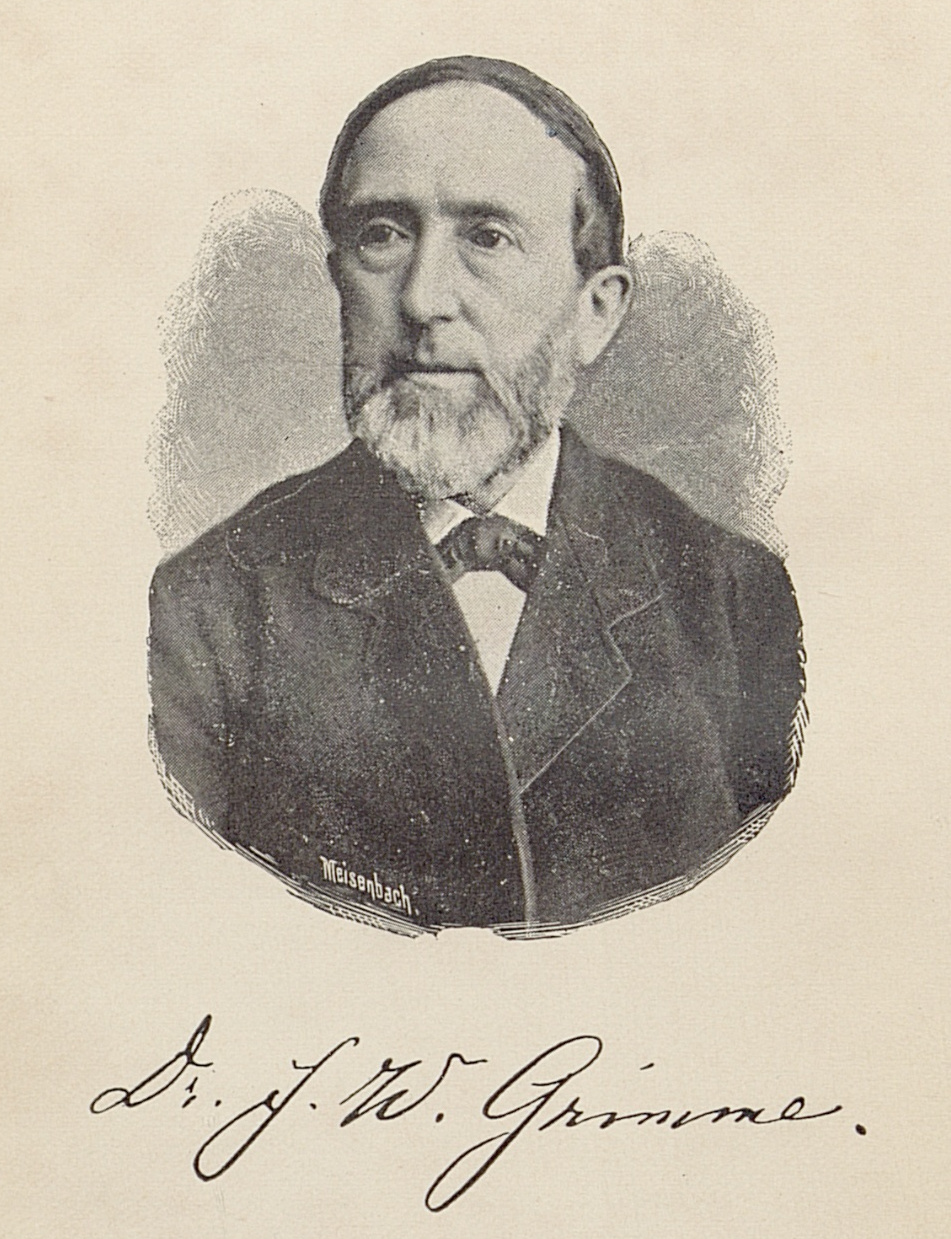
Friedrich Wilhelm Grimme

Friedrich Wilhelm Grimme (25 December 1827, Assinghausen – 2 April 1887, Münster) was a German regional (Sauerland) writer and poet.

From 1847 he studied philology and theology at the University of Münster, followed by work as a schoolteacher at the gymnasium in Arnsberg. Afterwards he taught classes in Brilon (1854) and at the Paulinum in Münster (1855). From 1856 to 1872 he was a teacher at the Theodorianum in Paderborn, then later relocated to Heiligenstadt as director of the Catholic gymnasium (1872–85). Grimme was one of the 56 founding members of the Freies Deutsches Hochstift (Free German Foundation).

The Friedrich-Wilhelm-Grimme-Weg, is an 85 km hiking trail maintained by the Sauerländischer Gebirgsverein (SGV, Sauerland Mountain Association).

== Published works (selection) ==
- Schwänke und Gedichte in sauerländischer Mundart (1861, 10th edition 1902) – Anecdotes and poems in the Sauerland dialect.
  - I. Sprickeln un Spöne.
  - II. Spargitzen.
- Das Sauerland und seine Bewohner (1866, 3rd edition 1905) – Sauerland and its inhabitants.
- De Koppelschmid : Lustspiel in sauerländischer Mundart (2nd edition, 1875) – Koppelschmid; comedy in the Sauerland dialect.
- Die Kinder aus der Musengasse : Lustspiel in zwei Akten, 1875 – The children from Musengasse; comedy in 2 acts.
- Grain Tuig : Schwänke und Gedichte in sauerländischer Mundart (4th edition 1881) – Grain Tuig; anecdotes and poems in the Sauerland dialect.
- Deutsche Weisen : Gedichte, 1881 – German ways: Poems.
- Galantryi-Waar : Schwänke und Gedichte in sauerländischer Mundart (3rd edition, 1884) – Galantryi-Waar; anecdotes and poems in the Sauerland dialect.
- Diusend Plasäier : Lustspiele in sauerländischer Mundart, 1890 – Diusend Plasäier; comedies in the Sauerland dialect.

In the field of botany, he was the author of "Uebersicht der Flora von Paderborn" (1867) and "Flora von Paderborn" (1868).
