= Jützenbach =

- Ortschaft of Sonnenstein
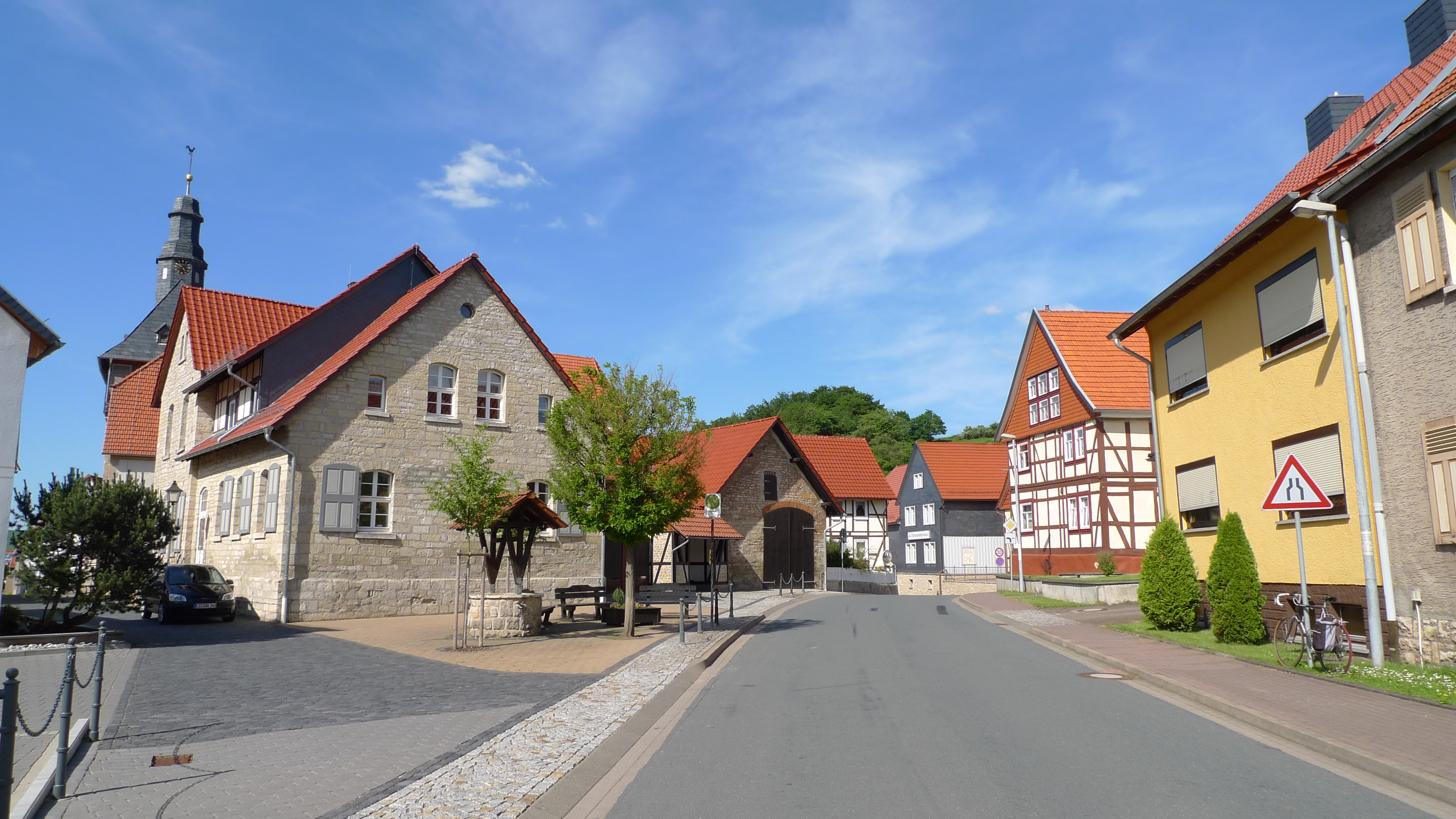

- Coat of arms
- Interactive map of Jützenbach
- Location within Germany Location within Thuringia
- Coordinates: 51°31′28″N 10°22′42″E
- Country: Germany
- State: Thuringia
- District: Eichsfeld
- Municipality: Sonnenstein

Area
  - Total: 8.67 km^{2} (3.35 sq mi)
- Elevation: 211–244 m (692–801 ft)

Population (2010-12-31)
  - Total: 544
  - Density: 62.7/km^{2} (163/sq mi)
- Time zone: UTC+01:00 (CET)
  - Summer (DST): UTC+02:00 (CEST)
- Postal codes: 37345
- Dialling codes: 036072

Jützenbach is a village and a former municipality in the district of Eichsfeld in Thuringia, Germany. Since 1 December 2011, it is part of the municipality Sonnenstein, of which it is an Ortschaft.
