= Adelebsen (German noble family) =

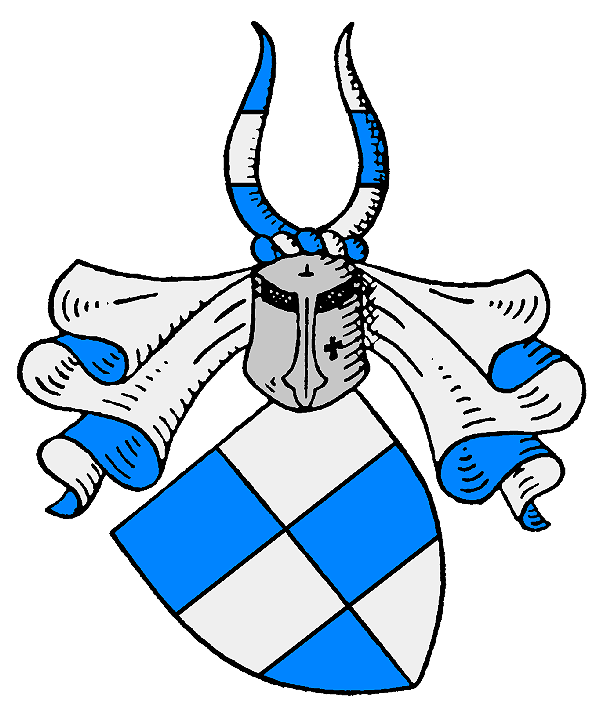
Adelebsen family coat of arms

The Adelebsen family was an old German noble family, which belonged to the medieval nobility (German: Uradel) originating from Göttingen.

== History ==
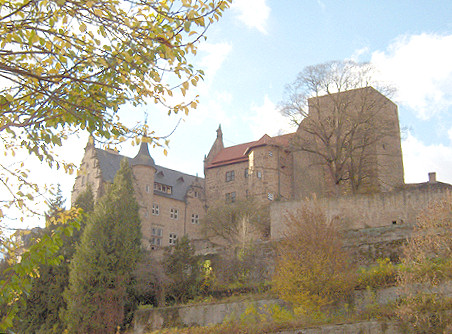
Adelebsen castle

The family originated in Wibbecke near Göttingen, Germany, leading to the family's former name von Wibbecke. They first appeared in the written document from 1111 with Knight Bertholdus miles de Wicbike. In the 1200s, they moved to Adelebsen castle on the banks of the Schwülme river and changed their name to von Adelebsen. On 30 June 1903 the family was awarded with the title of Freiherr in Prussia.

After the death of Georg Baron von Adelebsen in 1957, the family ceased to exist in male line. His only daughter, Baroness Adelheid Margarete Anna Marie Ottonie Ella von Adelebsen (1898–1987) married Count Wolfgang von Wolff-Metternich zur Gracht (1894–1967).

== Notable family members ==
- Reinhard von Adelebsen (1826–1883), estate owner and member of the German parliament.
