= Eller (Rhume) =

River in Germany

Location
- Country: Germany
- States: Lower Saxony and Thuringia

Physical characteristics
- Source
  - location: At the confluence of the Weilroder Eller and the Geroder Eller
  - coordinates: 51.5549°N 10.3726°E
- Mouth
  - location: Rhume
  - coordinates: 51.5811°N 10.2745°E

Basin features
- Progression: Rhume→ Leine→ Aller→ Weser→ North Sea

Eller (German pronunciation: [ˈɛlɐ]) is a river of Lower Saxony and Thuringia, Germany.

Its source is the confluence of the Weilroder Eller and the Geroder Eller. It flows into the Rhume in Rüdershausen.

== See also ==
- List of rivers of Lower Saxony
- List of rivers of Thuringia
