= Eller (surname) =

Family name

Eller and Eler is a German and Estonian surname. It is the surname of the following people:

- Allen Eller (1976–2016), American soccer player
- Are Eller (born 1947), Estonian sports journalist and rower
- August Eller (1907–1990), Estonian chess player
- Carl Eller (born 1942), American football player
- Cássia Eller (1962–2001), Brazilian musician
- Curtis Eller (born 1970), American banjo player and musician
- Ernest M. Eller (1903–1995), American rear admiral
- Fabiano Eller (born 1977), Brazilian footballer
- Hans Eller (1910–1943), German rower
- Heino Eller (1887–1970), Estonian composer
- Hillar Eller (1939–2010), Estonian politician
- Hod Eller (1891–1961), American baseball player
- Johann Theodor Eller (1689–1760), Prussian physician chemist
- John Eller (1883–1967), American athlete
- Kalle Eller (1940–2023), Estonian poet, publisher, neopagan and writer
- Karl Eller (1928–2019), American entrepreneur from Arizona
- Lars Eller (born 1989), Danish ice hockey player
- Marlin Eller, American programmer
- Thomas Eller (born 1964), German artist and writer
- Vernard Eller (1927–2007), American author
- Walton Eller (born 1982), American trap shooter
