= Erbsen =

- Ortschaft of Adelebsen
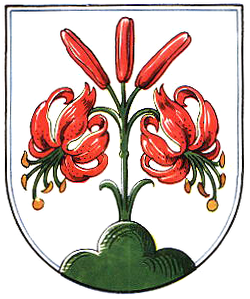
- Coat of arms
- Interactive map of Erbsen
- Location within Germany Location within Lower Saxony
- Coordinates: 51°35′0″N 9°48′20″E
- Country: Germany
- State: Lower Saxony
- District: Göttingen
- Municipality: Adelebsen
- Elevation: 195 m (640 ft)

Population
  - Total: 400
- Time zone: UTC+01:00 (CET)
  - Summer (DST): UTC+02:00 (CEST)
- Postal codes: 37139
- Dialling codes: 05506
- Vehicle registration: GÖ
- Website: www.adelebsen.de

Erbsen is a village in the Flecken (market town) Adelebsen in the Landkreis Göttingen in Lower Saxony, Germany. The village has about four hundred inhabitants. It lies some twelve kilometers west of Göttingen on the main road to Adelebsen proper.

== History ==
The oldest known written reference to Erbsen is some time between AD 826 and 876 in the Traditiones Corbeienses, where it was called Erpeshusen. The exact date of this reference is uncertain since it is only directly known from a fifteenth-century copy. In addition, the certainty that "Erpeshusen" actually refers to Erbsen has not been established, since it has been suggested that it could be referring to an abandoned village near Driburg. The name Erpessun is used in the Vita Meinwercci around 1015 to 1036. (The fact that Erbsen is German for "pea" is purely coincidental and not connected to the community's etymology.)

In the 1920s, the village expanded northward. After the Second World War, an additional expansion (Auf dem Höbel) was added between the original village area and the train tracks.

=== Church ===
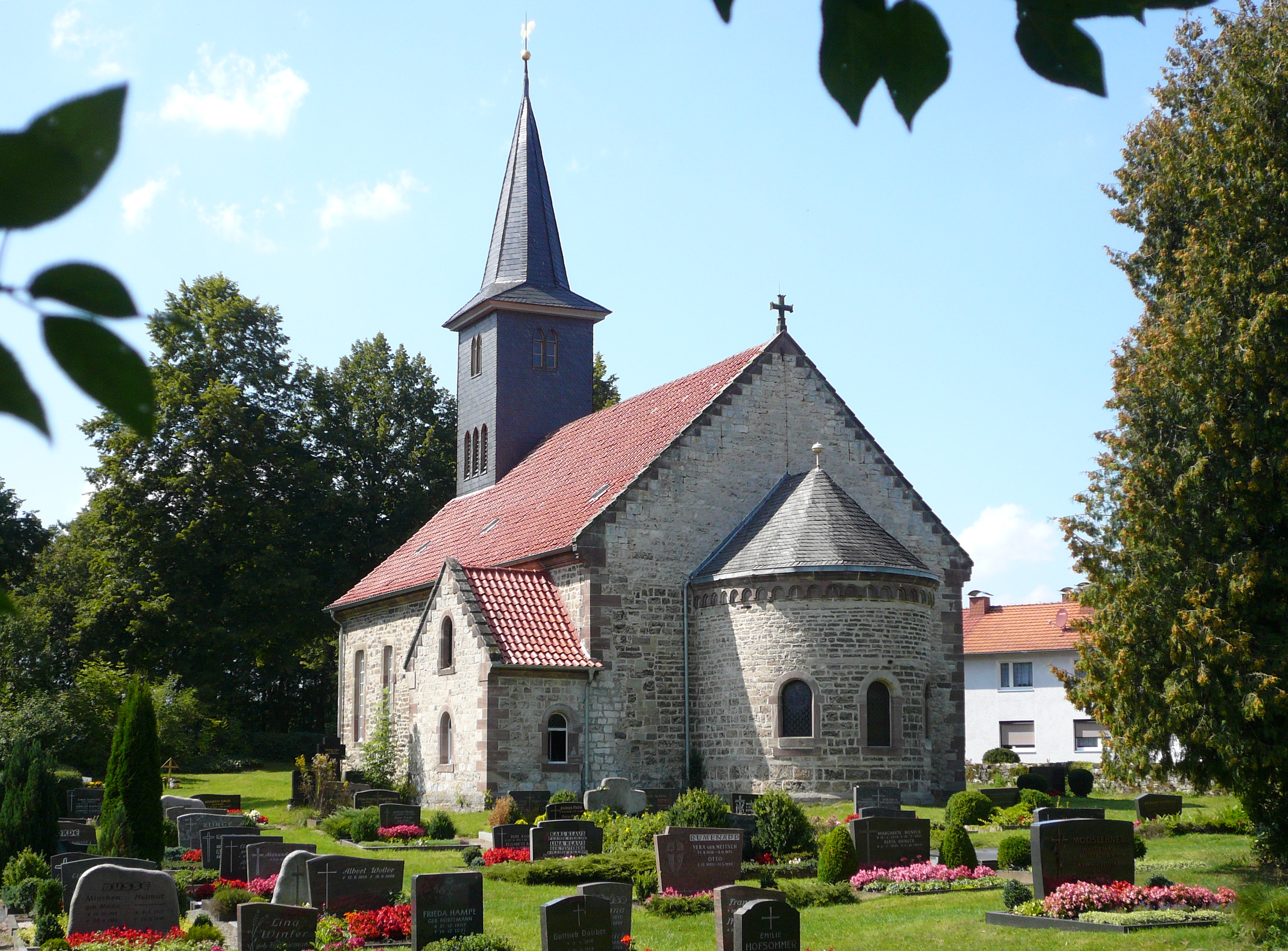

The earliest known reference to a church in Erbsen is from 1446. Today's St. Vitus is a Neo-Romantic building with a medieval core with seventeenth-century renovations and expansion. In 1975, a parsonage was built on the village hill of Kirchberg. Both buildings are designated cultural heritage sites.
