= Bernterode, Heilbad Heiligenstadt =

Bernterode
- Ortsteil of Heilbad Heiligenstadt
- Coat of arms
- Interactive map of Bernterode
- Location within Germany Location within Thuringia
- Coordinates: 51°18′11″N 10°9′10″E
- Country: Germany
- State: Thuringia
- District: Eichsfeld
- Town: Heilbad Heiligenstadt

Area
  - Total: 8.62 km^{2} (3.33 sq mi)
- Elevation: 330 m (1,080 ft)

Population (2017-12-31)
  - Total: 233
  - Density: 27.0/km^{2} (70.0/sq mi)
- Time zone: UTC+01:00 (CET)
  - Summer (DST): UTC+02:00 (CEST)
- Postal codes: 37308
- Dialling codes: 036082
- Vehicle registration: EIC

Bernterode (German pronunciation: [bɛʁntəˈʁoːdə]) is a village and a former municipality in the district of Eichsfeld in Thuringia, Germany. Since 1 January 2019, it is part of the town Heilbad Heiligenstadt.
