= Steinrode =

- Ortschaft of Sonnenstein
- Interactive map of Steinrode
- Location within Germany Location within Thuringia
- Coordinates: 51°30′6″N 10°29′34″E
- Country: Germany
- State: Thuringia
- District: Eichsfeld
- Municipality: Sonnenstein

Area
  - Total: 10.31 km^{2} (3.98 sq mi)
- Elevation: 215–367 m (705–1,204 ft)

Population (2010-12-31)
  - Total: 524
  - Density: 50.8/km^{2} (132/sq mi)
- Time zone: UTC+01:00 (CET)
  - Summer (DST): UTC+02:00 (CEST)
- Postal codes: 37345
- Dialling codes: 036077
- Website: www.vg-eichsfeld-suedharz.de

Steinrode is a former municipality in the district of Eichsfeld in Thuringia, Germany. Since 1 December 2011, it is part of the municipality Sonnenstein, of which it is an Ortschaft. The Ortschaft Steinrode consists of the villages Werningerode and Epschenrode.
