= Heuthen =

- Municipality
- Coat of arms

- Location of Heuthen within Eichsfeld district
- Interactive map of Heuthen
- Location within Germany Location within Thuringia
- Coordinates: 51°19′55″N 10°13′23″E
- Country: Germany
- State: Thuringia
- District: Eichsfeld
- Municipal assoc.: Leinetal

Government
  - Mayor (2022–28): Michael Gaßmann

Area
  - Total: 10.08 km^{2} (3.89 sq mi)
- Elevation: 410 m (1,350 ft)

Population (2025-12-31)
  - Total: 706
  - Density: 70.0/km^{2} (181/sq mi)
- Time zone: UTC+01:00 (CET)
  - Summer (DST): UTC+02:00 (CEST)
- Postal codes: 37308
- Dialling codes: 036084
- Vehicle registration: EIC
- Website: www.heuthen.de

Heuthen is a municipality in the district of Eichsfeld in Thuringia, Germany. It is the seat of a fourth-order administrative division. In 2017 it had a population of 764.
