= Geislede =

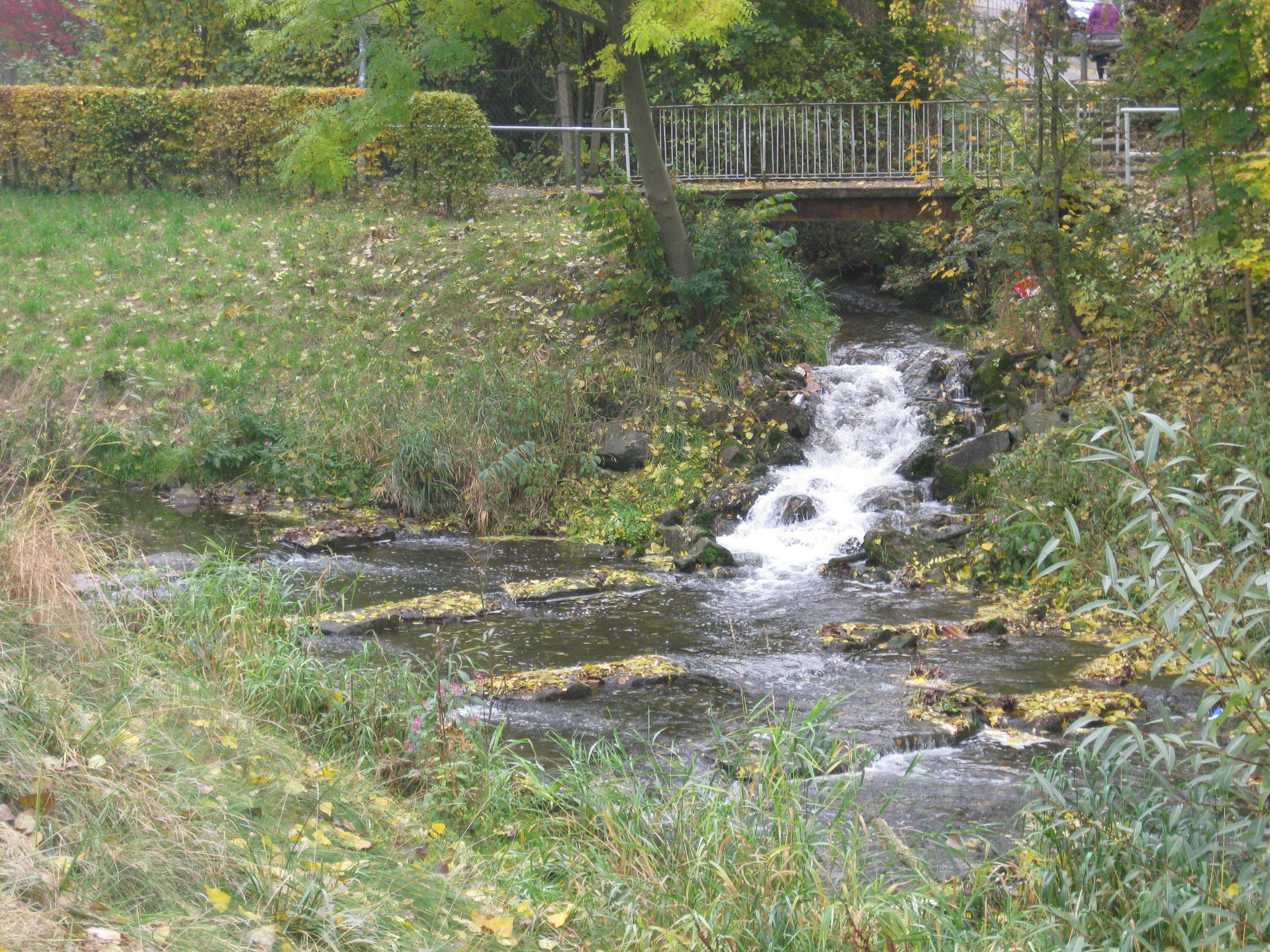

Location
- Country: Germany
- States: Thuringia

Physical characteristics
- Mouth
  - location: Leine
  - coordinates: 51.3802°N 10.1423°E

Basin features
- Progression: Leine→ Aller→ Weser→ North Sea

Geislede is a river of Thuringia, Germany. It flows into the Leine in Heilbad Heiligenstadt.

== See also ==
- List of rivers of Thuringia
