= Stöckey =

- Ortschaft of Sonnenstein
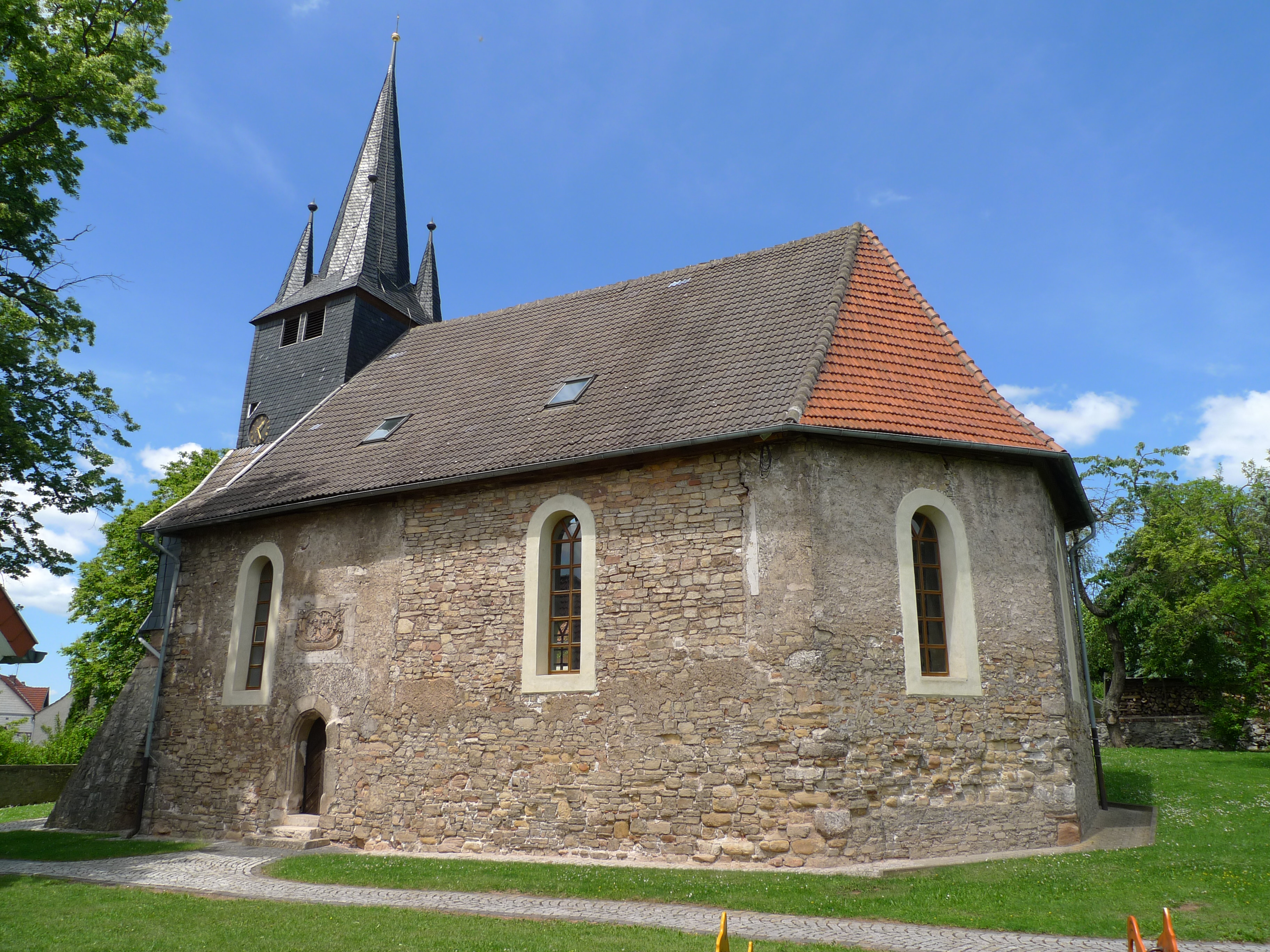

- Coat of arms
- Interactive map of Stöckey
- Location within Germany Location within Thuringia
- Coordinates: 51°32′2″N 10°30′10″E
- Country: Germany
- State: Thuringia
- District: Eichsfeld
- Municipality: Sonnenstein

Area
  - Total: 7.77 km^{2} (3.00 sq mi)
- Elevation: 226–245 m (741–804 ft)

Population (2010-12-31)
  - Total: 420
  - Density: 54/km^{2} (140/sq mi)
- Time zone: UTC+01:00 (CET)
  - Summer (DST): UTC+02:00 (CEST)
- Postal codes: 37345
- Dialling codes: 036072
- Website: www.vg-eichsfeld-suedharz.de

Stöckey is a village and a former municipality in the district of Eichsfeld in Thuringia, Germany. Since 1 December 2011, it is part of the municipality Sonnenstein, of which it is an Ortschaft.
