= Silkerode =

- Ortschaft of Sonnenstein
- Coat of arms
- Interactive map of Silkerode
- Location within Germany Location within Thuringia
- Coordinates: 51°34′7″N 10°24′1″E
- Country: Germany
- State: Thuringia
- District: Eichsfeld
- Municipality: Sonnenstein

Area
  - Total: 10.96 km^{2} (4.23 sq mi)
- Elevation: 190–323 m (623–1,060 ft)

Population (2010-12-31)
  - Total: 423
  - Density: 38.6/km^{2} (100/sq mi)
- Time zone: UTC+01:00 (CET)
  - Summer (DST): UTC+02:00 (CEST)
- Postal codes: 37345
- Dialling codes: 036072
- Website: www.silkerode.de

Silkerode is a village and a former municipality in the district of Eichsfeld in Thuringia, Germany. Since 1 December 2011, it is part of the municipality Sonnenstein, of which it is an Ortschaft.
