= Bockelnhagen =

- Ortschaft of Sonnenstein
- Coat of arms
- Interactive map of Bockelnhagen
- Location within Germany Location within Thuringia
- Coordinates: 51°33′50″N 10°25′18″E
- Country: Germany
- State: Thuringia
- District: Eichsfeld
- Municipality: Sonnenstein

Area
  - Total: 18.65 km^{2} (7.20 sq mi)
- Elevation: 205–268 m (673–879 ft)

Population (2010-12-31)
  - Total: 410
  - Density: 22/km^{2} (57/sq mi)
- Time zone: UTC+01:00 (CET)
  - Summer (DST): UTC+02:00 (CEST)
- Postal codes: 37345
- Dialling codes: 036072
- Website: www.bockelnhagen.de

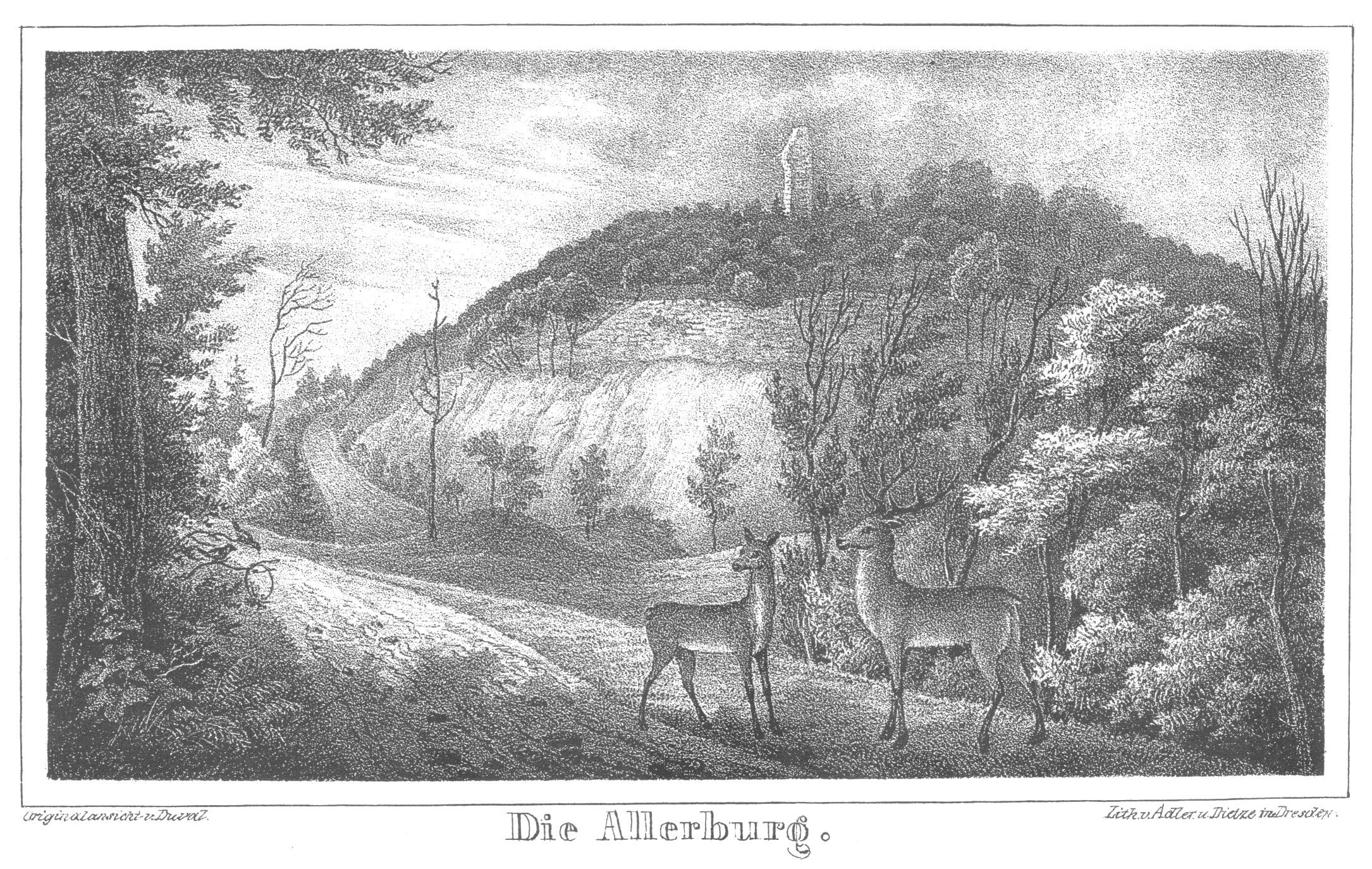
The Allerburg, a ruined castle at Bockelnhagen; by Carl Duval, c. 1840

Bockelnhagen is a village and a former municipality in the district of Eichsfeld in Thuringia, Germany. Since 1 December 2011, it is part of the municipality Sonnenstein, of which it is an Ortschaft. The community has two constituent parts, Bockelnhagen and Weilrode. Bockelnhagen is one of the few villages in the Eichsfeld district which were not part of the historical Eichsfeld.

== History ==
The first written mention of Bockelnhagen dates to 1143. From 1816 on, after the Congress of Vienna, it belonged to the Erfurt district of the Prussian Province of Saxony.
