= Bodenrode-Westhausen =

- Municipality
- Location of Bodenrode-Westhausen within Eichsfeld district
- Interactive map of Bodenrode-Westhausen
- Location within Germany Location within Thuringia
- Coordinates: 51°23′40″N 10°12′3″E
- Country: Germany
- State: Thuringia
- District: Eichsfeld
- Municipal assoc.: Leinetal

Government
  - Mayor (2022–28): Gerald Weidemann

Area
  - Total: 14.53 km^{2} (5.61 sq mi)
- Elevation: 279 m (915 ft)

Population (2025-12-31)
  - Total: 1,036
  - Density: 71.30/km^{2} (184.7/sq mi)
- Time zone: UTC+01:00 (CET)
  - Summer (DST): UTC+02:00 (CEST)
- Postal codes: 37308
- Dialling codes: 03606
- Vehicle registration: EIC
- Website: www.vg-leinetal.de

Bodenrode-Westhausen is a municipality in the district of Eichsfeld in Thuringia, Germany.
