= Weißenborn-Lüderode =

- Ortschaft of Sonnenstein
- Coat of arms
- Interactive map of Weißenborn-Lüderode
- Location within Germany Location within Thuringia
- Coordinates: 51°31′53″N 10°25′14″E
- Country: Germany
- State: Thuringia
- District: Eichsfeld
- Municipality: Sonnenstein

Area
  - Total: 26.20 km^{2} (10.12 sq mi)
- Elevation: 240 m (790 ft)

Population (2010-12-31)
  - Total: 1,399
  - Density: 53.40/km^{2} (138.3/sq mi)
- Time zone: UTC+01:00 (CET)
  - Summer (DST): UTC+02:00 (CEST)
- Postal codes: 37345
- Dialling codes: 036072
- Website: www.vg-eichsfeld-suedharz.de

Weißenborn-Lüderode is a village and a former municipality in the district of Eichsfeld in Thuringia, Germany. Since 1 December 2011, it is part of the municipality Sonnenstein, of which it is an Ortschaft and the seat.
