= Barterode =

Village in Lower Saxony, Germany

- Ortschaft of Adelebsen
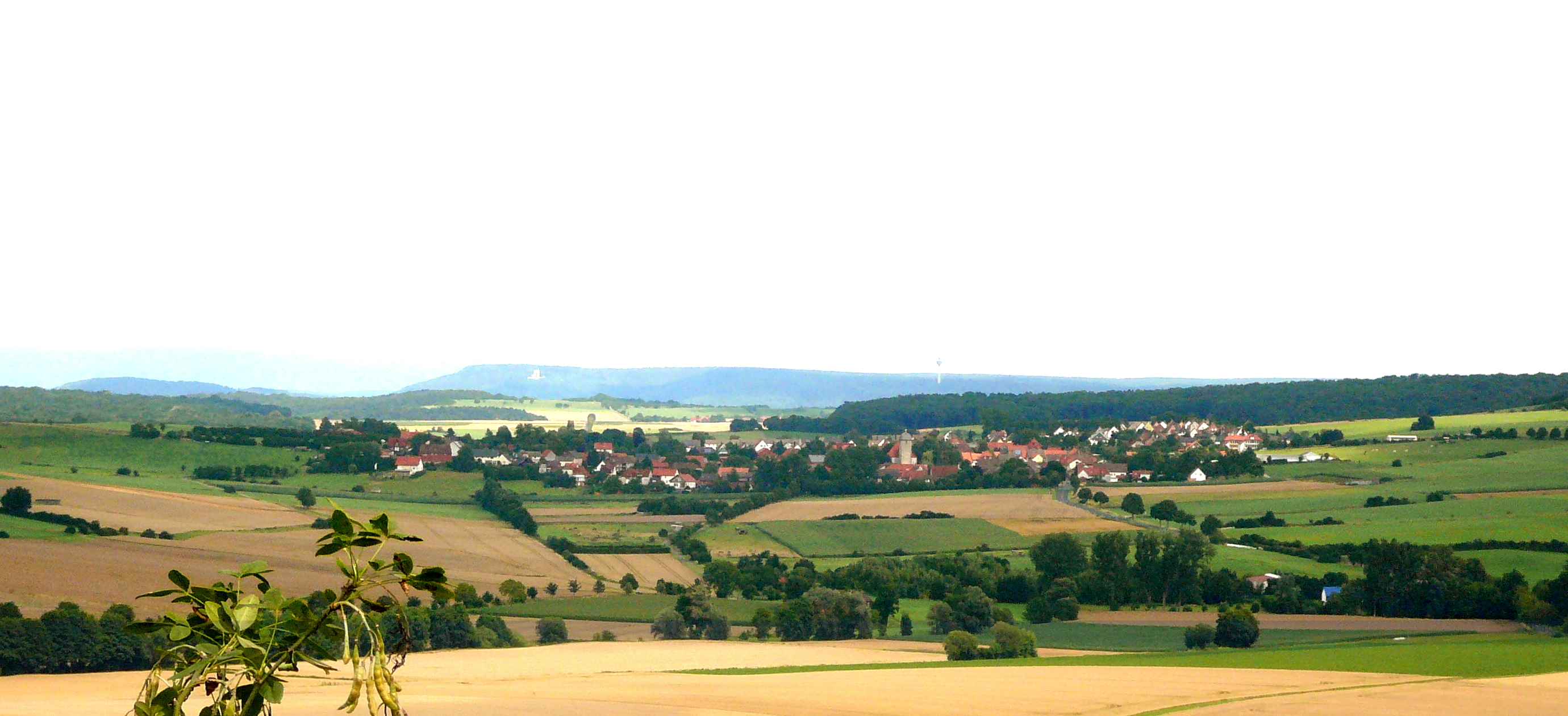
- Panoramic view of Barterode

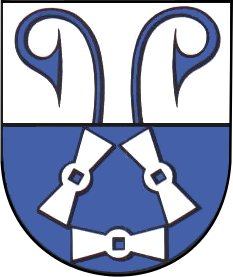
- Coat of arms
- Interactive map of Barterode
- Location within Germany Location within Lower Saxony
- Coordinates: 51°33′N 9°47′E
- Country: Germany
- State: Lower Saxony
- District: Göttingen
- Municipality: Adelebsen

Area
  - Total: 14.44 km^{2} (5.58 sq mi)
- Elevation: 255 m (837 ft)

Population (2018-12-31)
  - Total: 968
  - Density: 67.0/km^{2} (174/sq mi)
- Time zone: UTC+01:00 (CET)
  - Summer (DST): UTC+02:00 (CEST)
- Postal codes: 37139
- Dialling codes: 05506
- Vehicle registration: GÖ
- Website: www.barterode.de

Barterode is an urban subdivision in Adelebsen municipality in the south of Lower Saxony, situated about 12 km to the west of Göttingen.

== Places of interest ==
- Fire engine house (Spritzenhaus) Barterode:

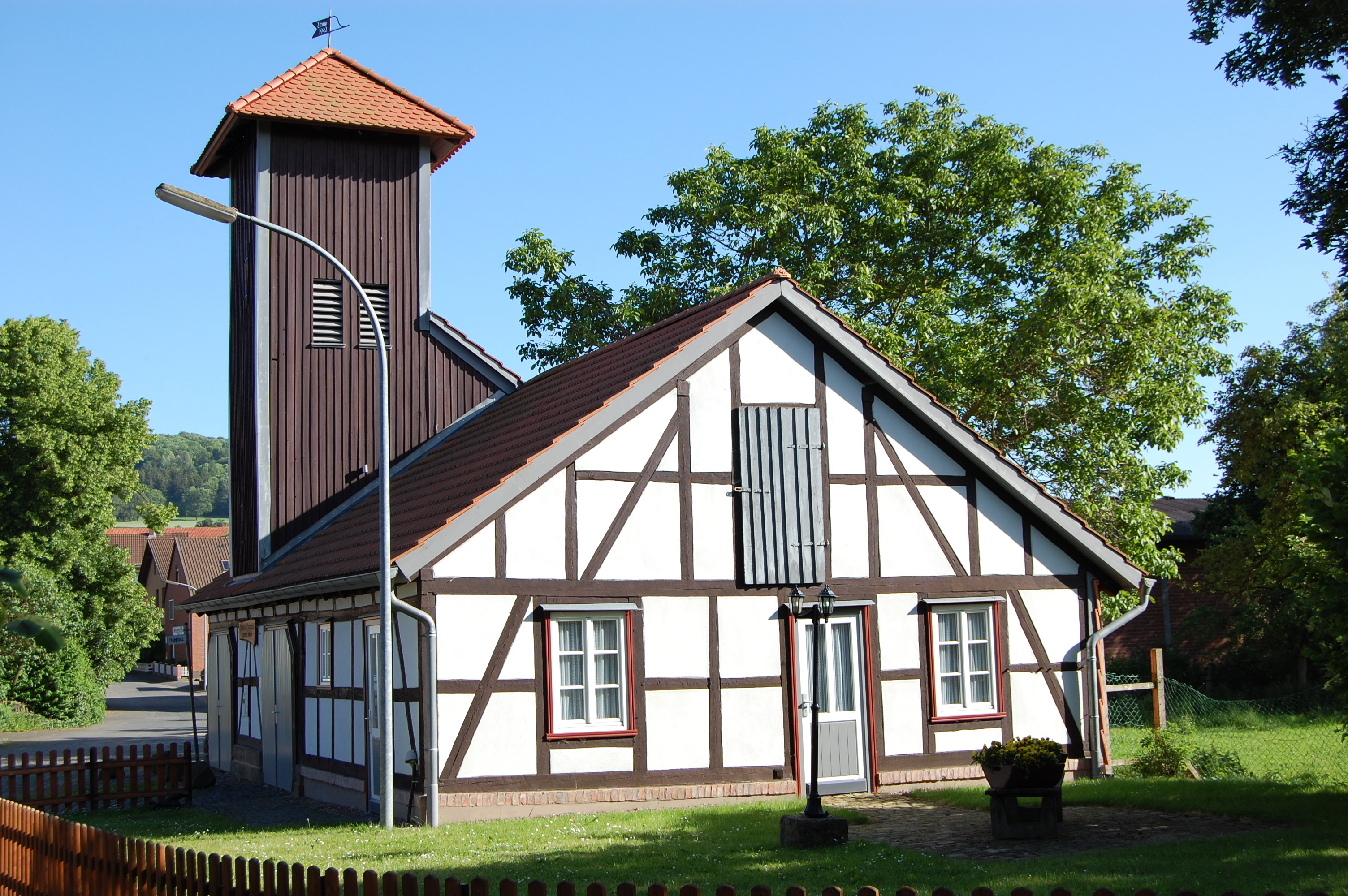
Barterode fire station
