= Zwinge =

- Ortschaft of Sonnenstein
- Coat of arms
- Interactive map of Zwinge
- Location within Germany Location within Thuringia
- Coordinates: 51°33′10″N 10°22′50″E
- Country: Germany
- State: Thuringia
- District: Eichsfeld
- Municipality: Sonnenstein

Area
  - Total: 5.17 km^{2} (2.00 sq mi)
- Elevation: 180–210 m (590–690 ft)

Population (2010-12-31)
  - Total: 415
  - Density: 80.3/km^{2} (208/sq mi)
- Time zone: UTC+01:00 (CET)
  - Summer (DST): UTC+02:00 (CEST)
- Postal codes: 37345
- Dialling codes: 036072
- Website: www.vg-eichsfeld-suedharz.de

Zwinge is a village and a former municipality in the district of Eichsfeld in Thuringia, Germany. Since 1 December 2011, it is part of the municipality Sonnenstein, of which it is an Ortschaft.
