= Tiergartenbach =

River in Germany

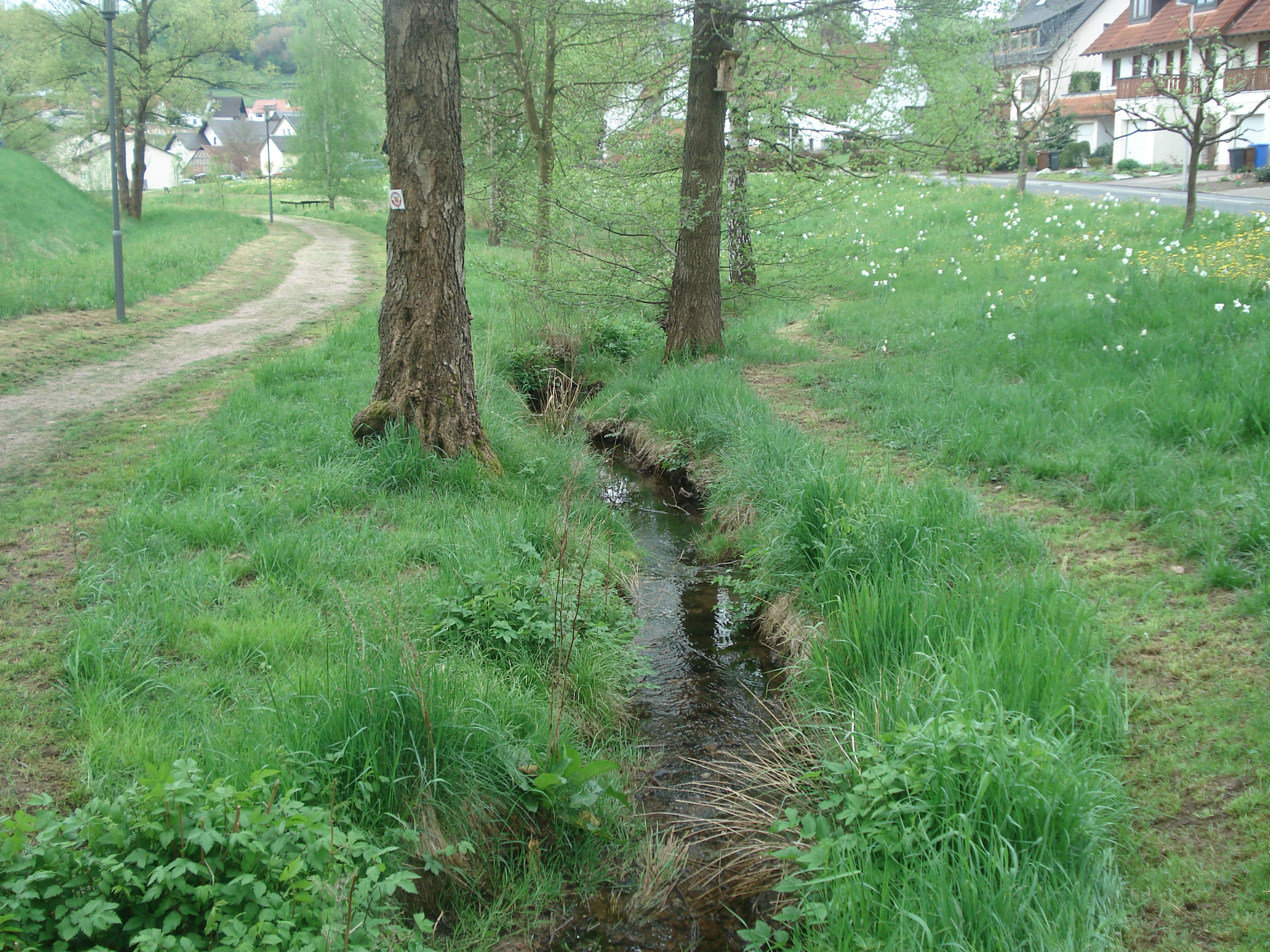
- The Tiergartenbach in Rabenhausen (Rothenbuch)

Location
- Country: Germany
- State: Bavaria

Physical characteristics
- Mouth
  - location: Hafenlohr
  - coordinates: 49.9680°N 9.3975°E

Basin features
- Progression: Hafenlohr→ Main→ Rhine→ North Sea

Tiergartenbach is a small river in Bavaria, Germany. It is a right tributary of the Hafenlohr in Rothenbuch.

== See also ==
- List of rivers of Bavaria
