= Indiana University Marching Hundred =

University marching band in Bloomington, Indiana

- School: Indiana University Bloomington
- Location: Bloomington, Indiana, U.S.
- Conference: Big Ten
- Founded: 1896
- Director: Dr. Tiffany J. Galus
- Members: 325

Uniform
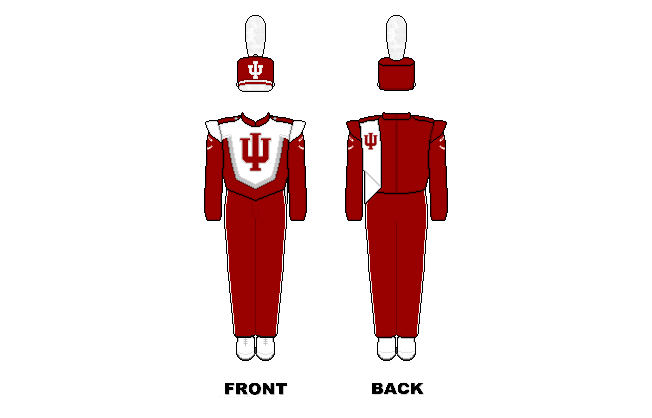

The Marching Hundred (or Hundred) is the marching band of Indiana University. The Marching Hundred is the product of tradition dating back to the organization of the first band at Indiana University in 1896, which was founded to provide recreation for interested students. The 22-piece band of 1896 grew to 47 members by 1913. The current band performs at all home Indiana Hoosiers football games, one away game, several campus events, and bowl game appearances. Toward the end of each season, the Marching Hundred holds an annual Showcase Concert in Indiana University's Assembly Hall. The Marching Hundred is the recipient of the 2007 Sudler Trophy. In 2012, the Marching Hundred performed a five-minute pregame show at Super Bowl XLVI.

== History ==
=== Early days ===
1917 Marching Hundred

The Marching Hundred began as the University Band in 1896. Lucius M. Hiatt directed the band from 1900 to 1910, which varied in size from nineteen to forty-seven members. John S. Taylor directed in 1911. Russell P. Harker directed the band in 1912 and 1913, followed by Carl F. Brand from 1914 to 1916. The group was taken to the Mexican border as part of the Indiana National Guard Second Regiment's band in 1916. Archie Warner took over directing the band in 1916 and membership grew to over a hundred by 1926. Grover C. Cleaver became drill master in 1924. Mark Hindsley became director in 1926.

=== "Marching Hundred" name established ===
Prior to the late 1920s, Indiana's marching band was simply known as the "Indiana University Band." The name "Marching Hundred" traces its origins to the 1927 season, when the band traveled to Boston for a game against Harvard University. During the pregame show at Harvard, the band marched in a 10x10 block, and radio broadcasters dubbed them "Indiana's Marching and Playing 100." The band gained recognition from these broadcasters for its halftime show at Harvard, in which the band spelled out "HARVARD" in a continuous drill, forming each letter successively as they marched across the field. The name given by the radio broadcasters became popular, and starting in 1928, the Indiana University Band began formally branding itself as the "Marching Hundred" in announcements and publications. V. E. Dillard took over direction of the Marching Hundred in 1929.

=== 1930–1969 ===
The Alpha Zeta chapter of Kappa Kappa Psi was established at Indiana University in 1931 in service to the band. By 1939, the band contained 139 members and was directed by Frederick E. Green. When the band expanded to 150 members under Dr. Ronald Gregory in the late 1950s, the name was entrenched. Sasha Ann Hire was the first majorette for the Marching Hundred in the 1950s.

The "Monogram IU"

=== Modern era ===
Ray E. Cramer took over directing the Marching Hundred in 1972. That same year the RedStepper Dance Team was added to the Hundred. Women marchers were allowed in 1973 following the passage of Title IX.

Stephen W. Pratt directed the Marching Hundred from 1986 to 1992. David Woodley became Director of the Marching Hundred in 1993. The Marching Hundred received the Sudler Intercollegiate Marching Band Trophy in 2007, recognizing bands of excellence. Construction on a facility for the Marching Hundred began in 2016. The Ray E. Cramer Marching Hundred Hall opened in 2017. Eric M. Smedley was appointed director of athletic bands in 2020, and assumed direction of the Marching Hundred with the appointment. Tiffany Galus was named codirector alongside Smedley in 2023, becoming the first female director for the band.

Despite the name, the Marching Hundred has had as many as 322 members, and membership has rarely dropped below 200 in recent decades.

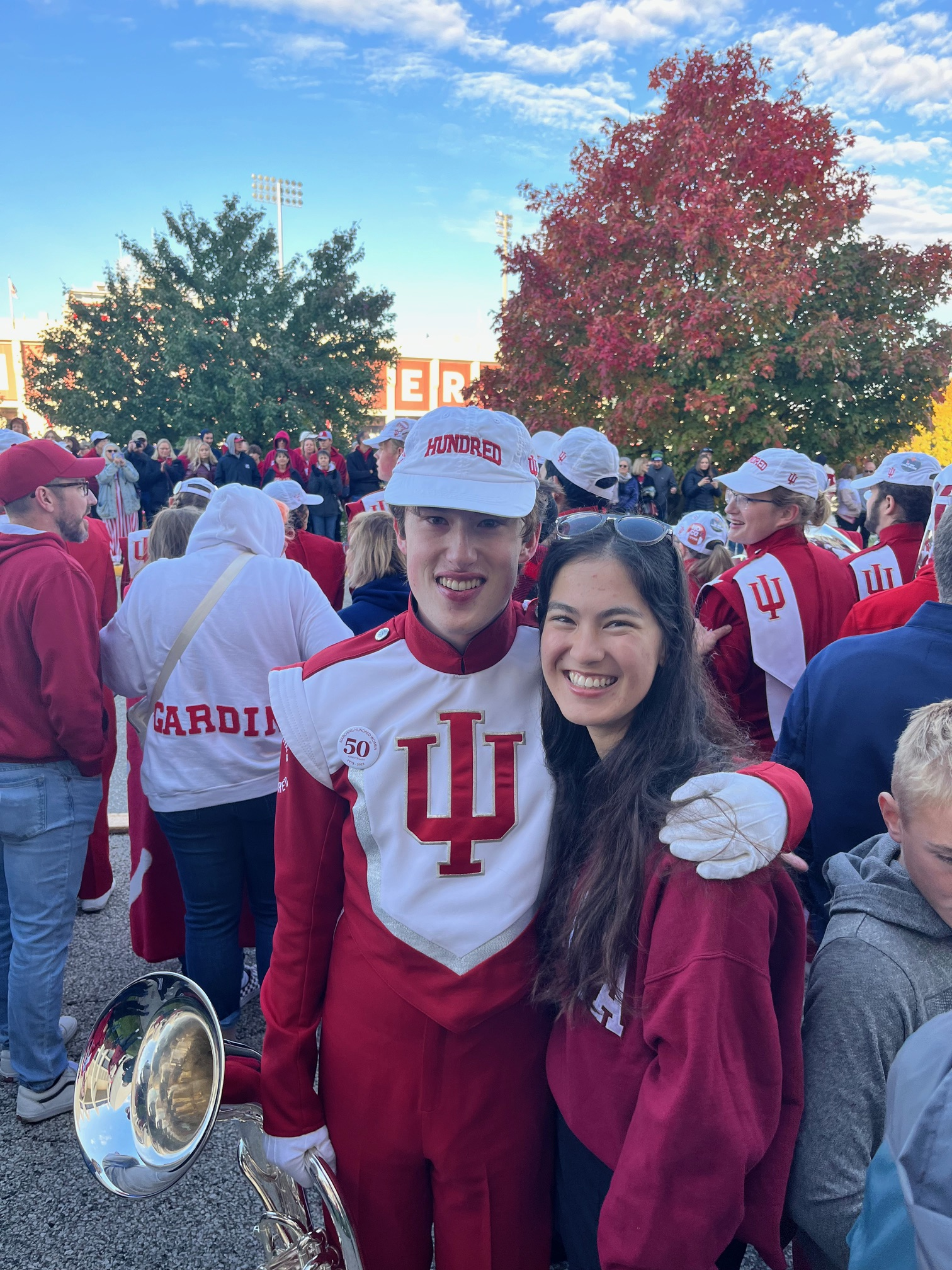
Marching Hundred member attending "The Walk"

== Bowl games and other appearances ==
The IU Marching Hundred performing at the RCA Dome

The band's appearances have included: the Kentucky Derby (1939), the Presidential Inaugural Parade (1953), the Rose Bowl (1968), the Holiday Bowl (1979), the All-American Bowl (1986), the Peach Bowl (1988 and 1990), the Liberty Bowl (1988), the Copper Bowl (1991), the Independence Bowl (1993), the Insight Bowl (2007), the Pinstripe Bowl (2015), the Foster Farms Bowl (2016), the Gator Bowl (2020), the Big Ten Championship Game (2025), the Rose Bowl (2026), including at Bandfest in Pasadena, the Peach Bowl (2026), and the College Football Playoff Championship Game (2026) in Miami, FL, as the Indiana Hoosiers won the 2026 national championship.

Returning from the 2006 away trip to Ohio State University the Marching Hundred stopped in Indianapolis to play at halftime during an Indianapolis Colts game at the RCA Dome. After this original performance, the Marching Hundred was invited back to the RCA dome to perform for the Indianapolis Colts' first playoff game in January 2007. However, due to the Colts not achieving home field advantage throughout the playoffs, the Hundred was not able to perform. The following season, the Hundred performed as the halftime entertainment for the Colts' season opener on Thursday, 6 September 2007. For the 2008 season, the Hundred performed for the Indianapolis Colts at their first regular season game at Lucas Oil Stadium making it the first marching band to perform on the field at the brand new stadium. Additionally in 2008, the Marching Hundred was asked to perform for a Chicago Bears game at Soldier Field.

=== Super Bowl XLVI ===
On Saturday, February 5, 2012, the Marching Hundred performed a five-minute pregame show at Super Bowl XLVI in Indianapolis, Indiana. The Hundred performed their signature song "Sing, Sing, Sing" and "ROCK in the USA" written by John Mellencamp, who lives in Bloomington, Indiana. The Hundred performed "R.O.C.K. in the USA" at the request of the NFL in order to demonstrate the culture of Indiana. Although the Hundred's performance was not completely televised, they could be seen in the background as the sports casters were talking about the game.

== Notable alumni ==
- Halson V. Eagleson Jr., brother to IU's first Black football player Preston Eagleson, black member of the IU Marching Hundred in the 1920s, first Black student to be awarded a doctorate in physics at Indiana University
- Booker T. Jones, an American musician, played trombone for the Marching Hundred in the 1960s.
- Herman B Wells, eleventh president of Indiana University Bloomington, played baritone in the university band starting in 1923 and acted as business manager for the group where he negotiated contracts with the Indianapolis 500 and Kentucky Derby for the band to perform.
