= Rothenbuch =

- Municipality
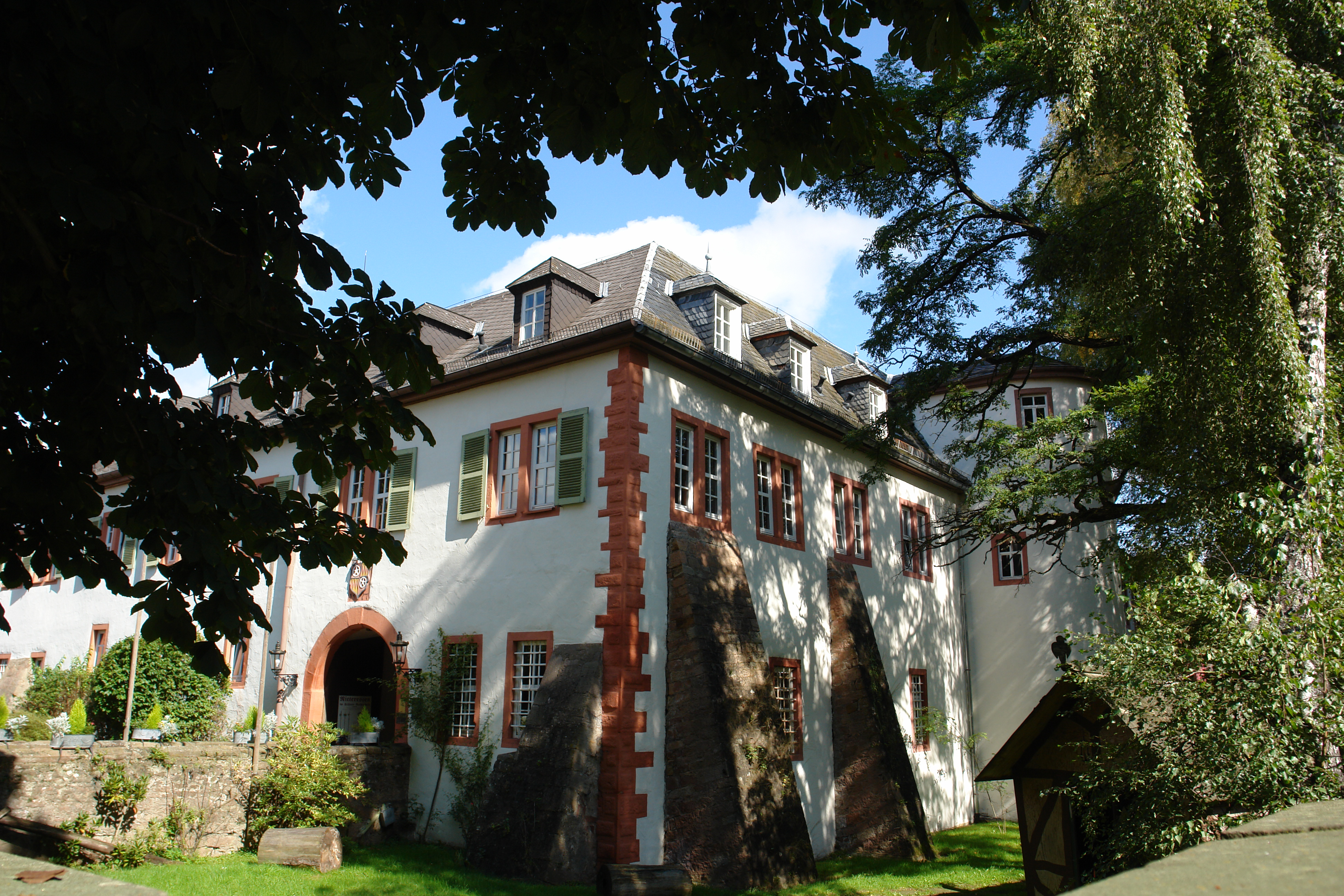
- Rothenbuch Palace

- Coat of arms

- Location of Rothenbuch within Aschaffenburg district
- Interactive map of Rothenbuch
- Location within Germany Location within Bavaria
- Coordinates: 49°58′N 9°24′E
- Country: Germany
- State: Bavaria
- Admin. region: Unterfranken
- District: Aschaffenburg

Government
  - Mayor (2020–26): Markus Fäth (SPD)

Area
  - Total: 7.05 km^{2} (2.72 sq mi)
- Elevation: 365 m (1,198 ft)

Population (2025-12-31)
  - Total: 1,658
  - Density: 235/km^{2} (609/sq mi)
- Time zone: UTC+01:00 (CET)
  - Summer (DST): UTC+02:00 (CEST)
- Postal codes: 63860
- Dialling codes: 06094
- Vehicle registration: AB
- Website: www.rothenbuch.de

Rothenbuch (German pronunciation: [ˈʁoːtn̩buːx]) is a municipality in the Aschaffenburg district in the Regierungsbezirk of Lower Franconia (Unterfranken) in Bavaria, Germany. It has a population of around 1,700.

== Geography ==
=== Location ===
Gemeindeteile

Rothenbuch lies in the region Bayerischer Untermain (Bavarian Lower Main), in Germany's largest consecutive broadleaf woodland, the Spessart. Rothenbuch is located between the Frankfurt Rhine Main Region, centred on Frankfurt, and the Würzburg region. The nearest international airport is Frankfurt Airport and the nearest InterCityExpress stop is the railway station at Aschaffenburg.

== History ==
In 1318, Rothenbuch had its first documentary mention in the words zuo den Rodenboychen when the Archbishop of Mainz, Peter of Aspelt and the Bishop of Würzburg, Gottfried III of Hohenlohe, concluded an agreement here dealing with cooperation on security questions.

In 1342, building work began on what was initially likely a hunting lodge at the source of the Hafenlohr. In the German Peasants' War in 1525, this Schloss (castle) in Rothenbuch was heavily damaged or destroyed. In 1566, it was not only rebuilt but also expanded on Elector of Mainz Daniel Brendel von Homburg’s orders.

A first drawing of Rothenbuch is to be found on the oldest extant map of the Spessart, the so-called Pfinzigkarte from 1594.

Rothenbuch achieved its greatest political importance when the Amtskellerei Rothenbuch, a financial and administrative authority for 14 places in the High Spessart, was established. In 1782, Rothenbuch was declared the seat of the Amtsvogtei.

The Electoral Mainz Amt passed along with this under the 1803 Reichsdeputationshauptschluss to the newly formed Principality of Aschaffenburg, with which it passed in 1814 (by this time it had become a department of the Grand Duchy of Frankfurt) to the Kingdom of Bavaria.

On 3 June 1814, Rothenbuch became the seat of a Royal Bavarian Court. In 1879, the Court was dissolved and Rothenbuch was incorporated into the Bezirksamt and later District (Landkreis) of Lohr. In 1972, this district was abolished and Rothenbuch was grouped into the current Aschaffenburg district. From 1977 to 1993, Rothenbuch, along with Waldaschaff and Weibersbrunn, formed a Verwaltungsgemeinschaft (municipal association). On 1 January 1994, Rothenbuch regained its municipal autonomy.

== Demographics ==
Within the municipal area, 993 inhabitants were counted in 1900, 1,476 in 1950 and 1,975 in 2007.

== Economy ==
Municipal tax revenue in 2007 amounted to €1,000,000, of which business taxes (net) made up €155,000. The municipality's per capita debt amounted to 0.

=== Agriculture and forestry ===
According to official statistics, there were 47 workers on the social welfare contribution rolls working in agriculture and forestry in 1998. In producing businesses this was 118, and in trade and transport 25. In other areas, 48 workers on the social welfare contribution rolls were employed, and 665 such workers worked from home. There was one processing business. Five businesses were in construction (2 in the industry itself and 3 others in related fields), and furthermore, there are 2 agricultural operations with a meadowland area of 157 ha.

The statistics for 2003 show that there were 543 workers commuting to jobs elsewhere, whereas 111 commuted to jobs in the municipality.

== Governance ==
=== Municipal council ===
The council is made up of 13 council members, counting the full-time mayor.

	SPD	CSU	Freie Bürger	Total
2008	7	3	3	13 seats

(as at municipal election held on 2 March 2008)

Elections in March 2014:

- SPD: 7
- CSU: 3
- Free voters: 3

=== Mayor ===
Since 2020, the mayor has been Markus Fäth (SPD).

=== Coat of arms ===
The municipality's arms might be described thus: Party per fess, Or dexter a beech eradicated and sinister a stag's attires gules, gules a wheel spoked of six argent.

The Wheel of Mainz refers to the slightly less than 500 years in which Rothenbuch belonged to the Archbishopric of Mainz. The beechtree and the hart's antlers symbolize the forest and the hunt respectively.

== Arts and culture ==
=== Schloss Rothenbuch ===
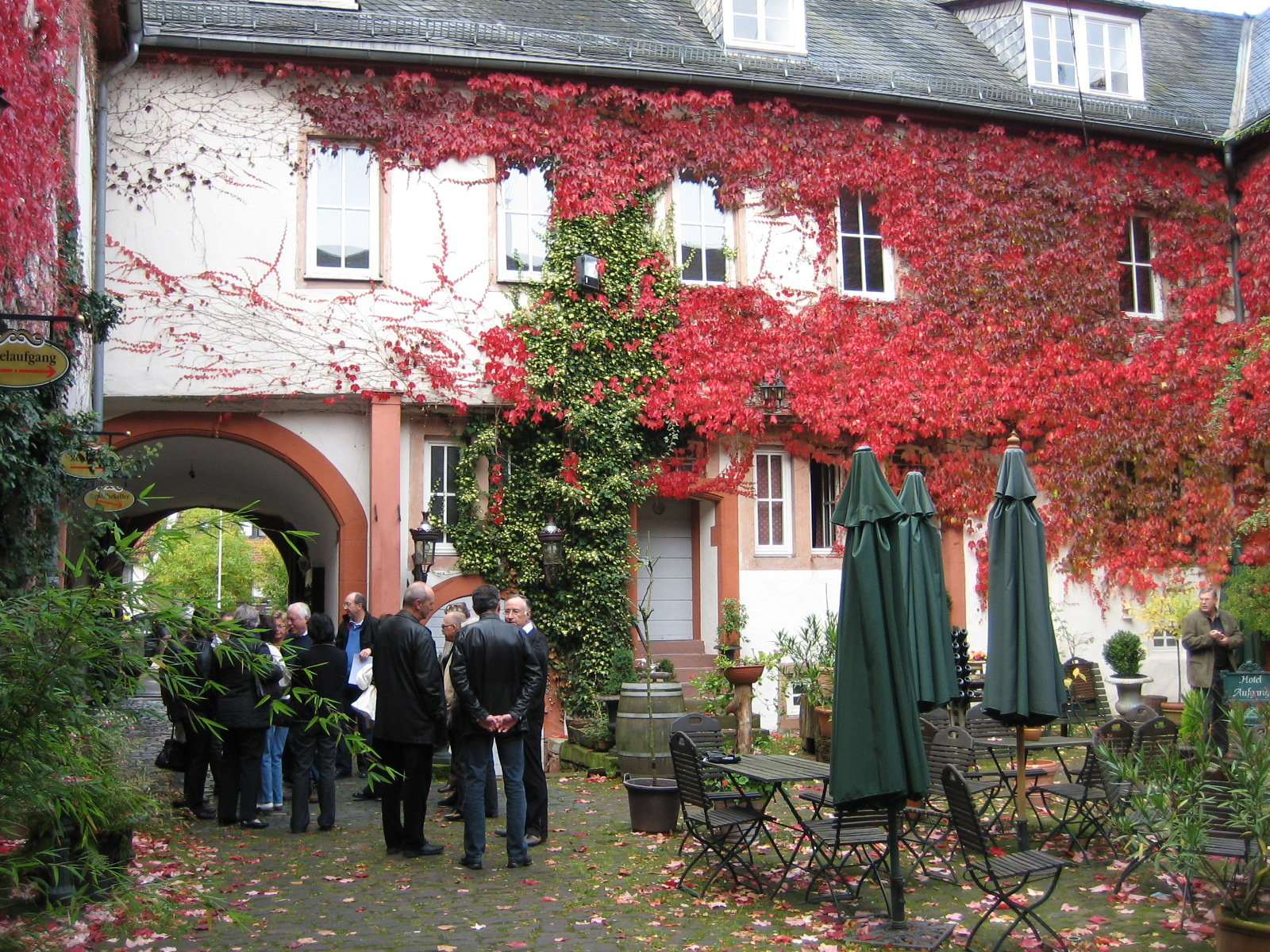
View of part of Schloss Rothenbuch's inner courtyard

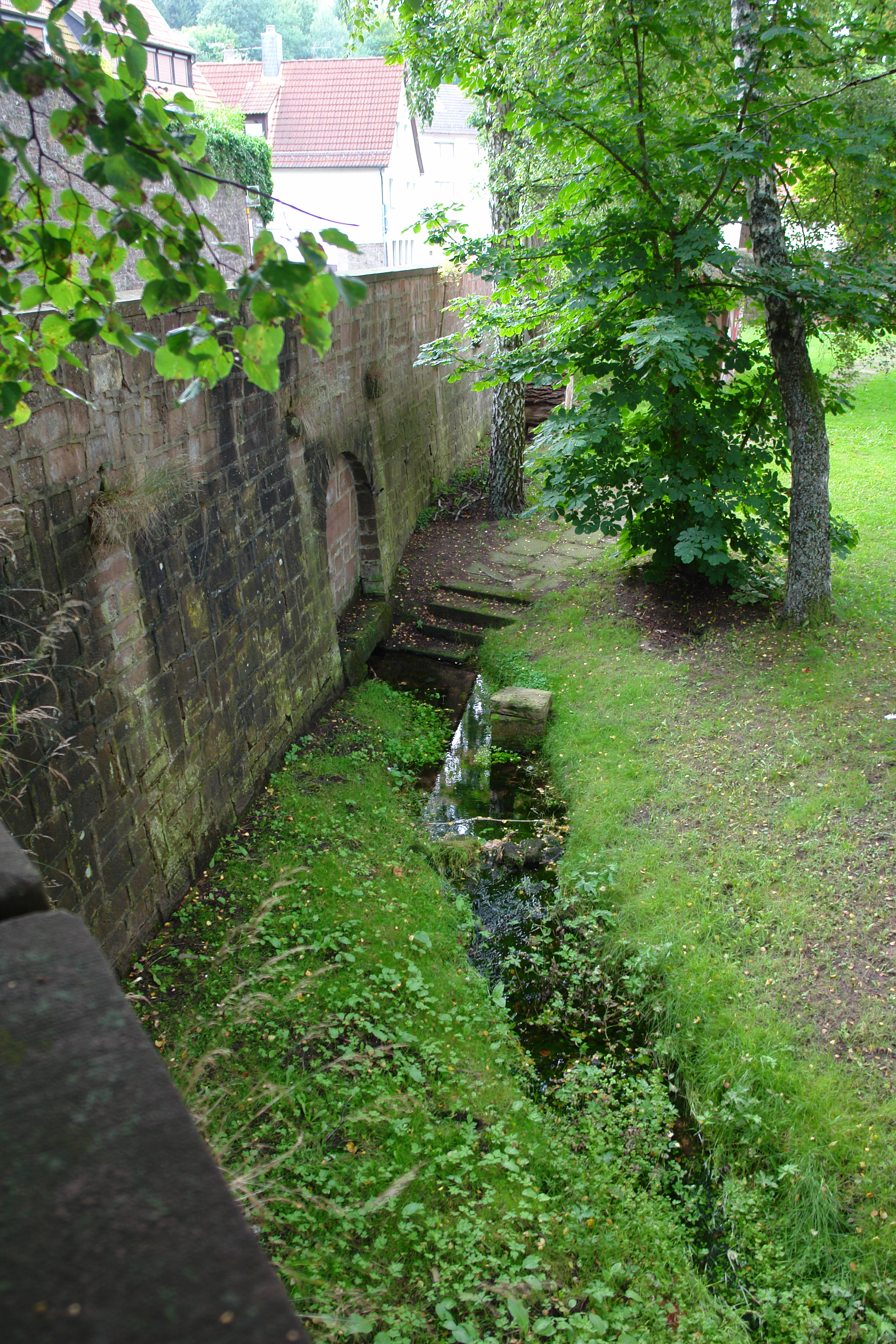
Source of the Hafenlohr

The castle had its first mention in an extant document from 3 July 1318. Found today on the site is a former hunting castle that was built to Daniel Brendel von Homburg's plans in 1567. The four-winged complex features a rectangular inner courtyard with a polygonal stair tower in the north wing. That the castle formerly had a moat can be clearly seen in the two access bridges. At the castle rises the Hafenlohr, which once filled the moat and also the nearby ponds that teemed with fish. The castle served as a central administrative seat in the Spessart and was for more than two centuries the lawcourt for 14 surrounding municipalities. Since 1994, the building has been used as a hotel. Since 2017 the castle no longer a hotel, but is used by the French company Châteauform' as an event venue for business meetings, corporate retreats and conferences.

=== Other attractions ===
- European cultural hiking path
- Heimatmuseum Altes Bauernhaus (local history museum)
- Rothenbuch forest contains some of Germany's oldest stands of oak can be found.

=== Events ===
The "Historic Christmas Market" is held on the first weekend in Advent, with more than 15,000 visitors.

== Infrastructure ==
=== Transport ===
Rothenbuch lies 7 km from Autobahn A 3 (Weibersbrunn interchange). Bundesstraße 26 from Aschaffenburg to Würzburg runs by 3 km from the municipality. Rothenbuch is served by buses from Aschaffenburg and Lohr.

== Education ==
In 1999, the following institutions were in the municipality:

- Kindergartens: 75 places with 61 children
- Primary schools: 1 with 5 teachers and 96 pupils

== Other ==
=== Awards ===
- 2005 district winner in the contest Unser Dorf soll schöner werden - Unser Dorf hat Zukunft (“Our Village Should Become Lovelier – Our Village Has a Future”)
- 2006 2nd place in Lower Franconia contest Unser Dorf soll schöner werden
- 2006 district winner in the contest Lebendiges Grün in Stadt und Land (“Living Green in Town and Country”)
- 2006 “Nicest Christmas Market in the Bavarian Lower Main” (according to the Stadtzeitung Aschaffenburg newspaper)
- 2008 district winner in the contest Unser Dorf soll schöner werden - Unser Dorf hat Zukunft

== Sons and daughters of the municipality ==
- Carl Brand (1893-1945), doctor and victim of the Nazis. In Rothenbuch a road was named after him in 1980, in Lohr in 2008.
