= Steinbach (Hafenlohr) =

River in Germany

- The Steinbach east of Weibersbrunn

Location
- Country: Germany
- State: Bavaria

Physical characteristics
- Mouth
  - location: Hafenlohr
  - coordinates: 49.9358°N 9.4072°E
- Length: 5.5 km (3.4 mi)

Basin features
- Progression: Hafenlohr→ Main→ Rhine→ North Sea

Steinbach (upstream also called Weibersbach) is a river of Bavaria, Germany. It is a right tributary of the Hafenlohr near Weibersbrunn.

== See also ==
- List of rivers of Bavaria
