= Weibersbrunn =

- Municipality
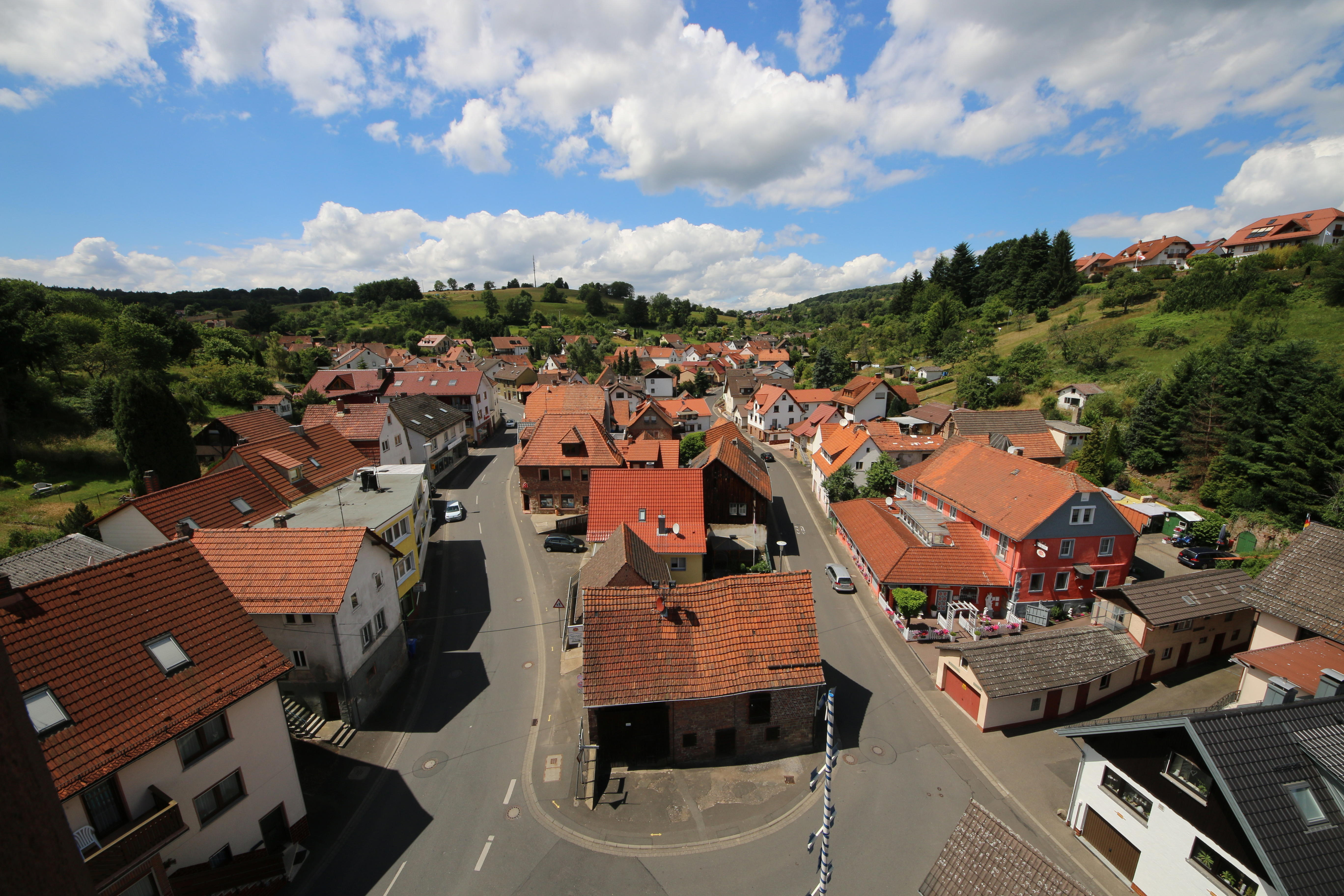
- Central Weibersbrunn

- Coat of arms

- Location of Weibersbrunn within Aschaffenburg district
- Interactive map of Weibersbrunn
- Location within Germany Location within Bavaria
- Coordinates: 49°56′N 9°22′E
- Country: Germany
- State: Bavaria
- Admin. region: Unterfranken
- District: Aschaffenburg

Government
  - Mayor (2020–26): Walter Schreck

Area
  - Total: 2.89 km^{2} (1.12 sq mi)
- Elevation: 354 m (1,161 ft)

Population (2025-12-31)
  - Total: 1,806
  - Density: 625/km^{2} (1,620/sq mi)
- Time zone: UTC+01:00 (CET)
  - Summer (DST): UTC+02:00 (CEST)
- Postal codes: 63879
- Dialling codes: 06094
- Vehicle registration: AB
- Website: www.weibersbrunn.de

Weibersbrunn is a municipality with a population of 1,752 as of December 2024. It is located in the Aschaffenburg district in the Regierungsbezirk of Lower Franconia (Unterfranken) in Bavaria, Germany.

== Etymology ==
The name "Weiberbrunn" is derived from the Weibersbach, a contributory of the Hafenlohr. It rises at the western end of the village. The Middle High German Brunn refers to a well or spring. Weibers probably derives from the proper name "Wibert".

== Geography ==
=== Location ===
Gemeindeteile

The municipality lies in the Spessart range of hills. It is located in the Aschaffenburg district in the Regierungsbezirk of Lower Franconia (Unterfranken). Topographically, the town is located at an elevation of around 350 m in the valley of the Weibersbach, which is a side valley of the Hafenlohrtal.

=== Subdivision ===
Weiberbrunn has three Gemeindeteile: Weibersbrunn, Echterspfahl (2.5 km southwest of the town) and Rohrbrunn (4 km southeast of Weibersbrunn).

The municipality has only the following Gemarkung (traditional rural cadastral area): Weibersbrunn.

The municipal territory is not continuous: Both Echterspfahl and Rohrbrunn are separated from Weibersbrunn itself by stretches of forest that are part of the gemeindefreie Gebiete (see below).

=== Neighbouring municipalities ===
Weibersbrunn borders on (from the north, clockwise): Rothenbucher Forst, Rothenbuch, Rohrbrunner Forst, Waldaschaffer Forst. Except for Rothenbuch, these are all gemeindefreie Gebiete mostly covered by forest.

== History ==
Originally, Weibersbrunn was just a roadhouse on the Eselsweg (donkey trail), a long-distance trade route through the Spessart. In 1706, the Weibersbrunner Glashütte was founded as a subsidiary of the Electoral Mainz Spiegelglasmanufaktur (mirror manufacturing) at Lohr. For over 150 years, high-quality glass (window panes, goblets) was produced here. The highly valued semicircular crown glass sheets – called Mondglas or "Moon Glass" – used for window panes, was delivered to Aschaffenburg. Other products went to Lohr. Mondglas made Weibersbrunn internationally known. After Guillaume Brument, the French master glass maker died in 1759, local knowledge of the necessary techniques faded and the quality of the Mondglas declined. In addition, in the period of industrialization, local glass production became uncompetitive due to a lack of railway transport. Before the motorway was built, Weibersbrunn was connected to the outside world primarily by the Poststrasse (postal road) Aschaffenburg-Würzburg, either at Echterspfahl or at Hessenthal (Mespelbrunn).

The village grew around the glass works, with craftsmen supplying intermediate products and services to the works. Although glass production started to incur losses, these were covered by the Hochstift Mainz until its end in 1803. In 1805, the works were auctioned off and after that run by various entrepreneurs, but without much success.

The Electoral Mainz area in the Hochspessart (High Spessart) was merged into the Principality of Aschaffenburg in 1803 and in 1810 it became part of the Grand Duchy of Frankfurt, shortly thereafter, however, passing between 1814 and 1816 to the Kingdom of Bavaria by way of Austria. In the course of administrative reform in Bavaria, the current municipality came into being with the Gemeindeedikt ("Municipal Edict") of 1818.

In 1861, the glass works closed following a long period of stagnation. This brought on a period of destitution for the local population that only ended with the building of the motorway around 100 years later. During that time, locals had to earn a living as itinerant labourers in the large cities or in strenuous forestry work as the local soil was ill-suited for successful agriculture.

Virtually no signs of glass production remain today, the works were replaced by the new parish church in 1862 (consecrated in 1864). Glass products made at Weibersbrunn can today be viewed in the Spessartmuseum at Lohr and in a small Heimatmuseum in the village.

On 1 July 1862, the Bezirksamt Aschaffenburg was established and its territory included Weibersbrunn. In 1939, Germany introduced Landkreise (districts) and Weibersbrunn now was one of 33 municipalities in the old Landkreis Aschaffenburg. In the course of Gebietsreform, this was merged with Landkreis Alzenau in Unterfranken to form the current Landkreis Aschaffenburg (Aschaffenburg district).

The Autobahn (motorway) through the Spessart was built in 1955-60. This allowed locals to commute to the Rhine-Main region and brought in tourists. Hotels were opened and the motorway restaurants and gas stations at Rohrbrunn brought tax income to the municipality.

In 1966, the parish church St. Johannes Nepomuk was enlarged.

From 1977 to 1993, Weibersbrunn was part of a Verwaltungsgemeinschaft (administrative community) with Waldaschaff and Rothenbuch.

In 2006, the municipality marked its 300th anniversary with a great festival.

=== Rohrbrunn ===
This settlement, located at an elevation of around 465 m, is today made up of the service buildings on both sides of the motorway, a former Forstamt and the Jagdschloss Luitpoldhöhe.

In 1686, Melchior Urzuber, a hunter for the Archbishop of Mainz opened an inn here. It later became a posting house of the Kaiserliche Reichspost (Imperial Mail). The last member of the Urzuber family left in 1790, and their successor replaced the wooden structure with a stone building. In 1820, the Postdirektion Frankfurt of the Thurn-und-Taxis Post dissolved the station, but it remained an inn. From 1920, it was run by a new tenant under the name Wirtshaus im Spessart, probably inspired by Wilhelm Hauff's story (which also was the basis of a 1958 film. The inn was demolished during the construction of the Autobahn in 1959. It remains unclear, though, whether Hauff himself was modelling the inn in his story on the Rohrbrunn place or on a similar location in Hessenthal.

Also at Rohrbrunn is the Jagdschloss Luitpoldhöhe which was built in 1889 and served as Prince Regent Luitpold's hunting lodge. He visited Weibersbrunn when hunting boars and deer between 1887 and 1911. From 1920-96, the castle was used as living quarters for the forest service. Today, it is private property.

=== Echterspfahl ===
This is named after a wooden stake with three metal rings. Historically, the woodland possessions of the Counts of Rieneck, the Prince-Bishops of Würzburg and the Echter family (of Mespelbrunn Castle) met in this area. In case of border disputes, representatives of the feudal lords reportedly came here, each tying their respective horses to one of the metal rings. Today, there is an inn here (in operation since 1934), in a building that previously served as a forester's lodge.

== Demographics ==
Within municipality limits in 1970, 1,817 inhabitants were counted, in 1987 1,934, in 2000 2,146 and in 2006 2,109.

The figures given for Weibersbrunn's population in the 19th century are 721 in 1826, 960 in 1852 and 817 in 1859 (Klauprecht 1826, Virchow 1968, Hecht/Reder 2002).

== Economy ==
Municipal tax revenue amounted in 1999 to €975,000 (converted), of which net business taxes accounted for €144,000.

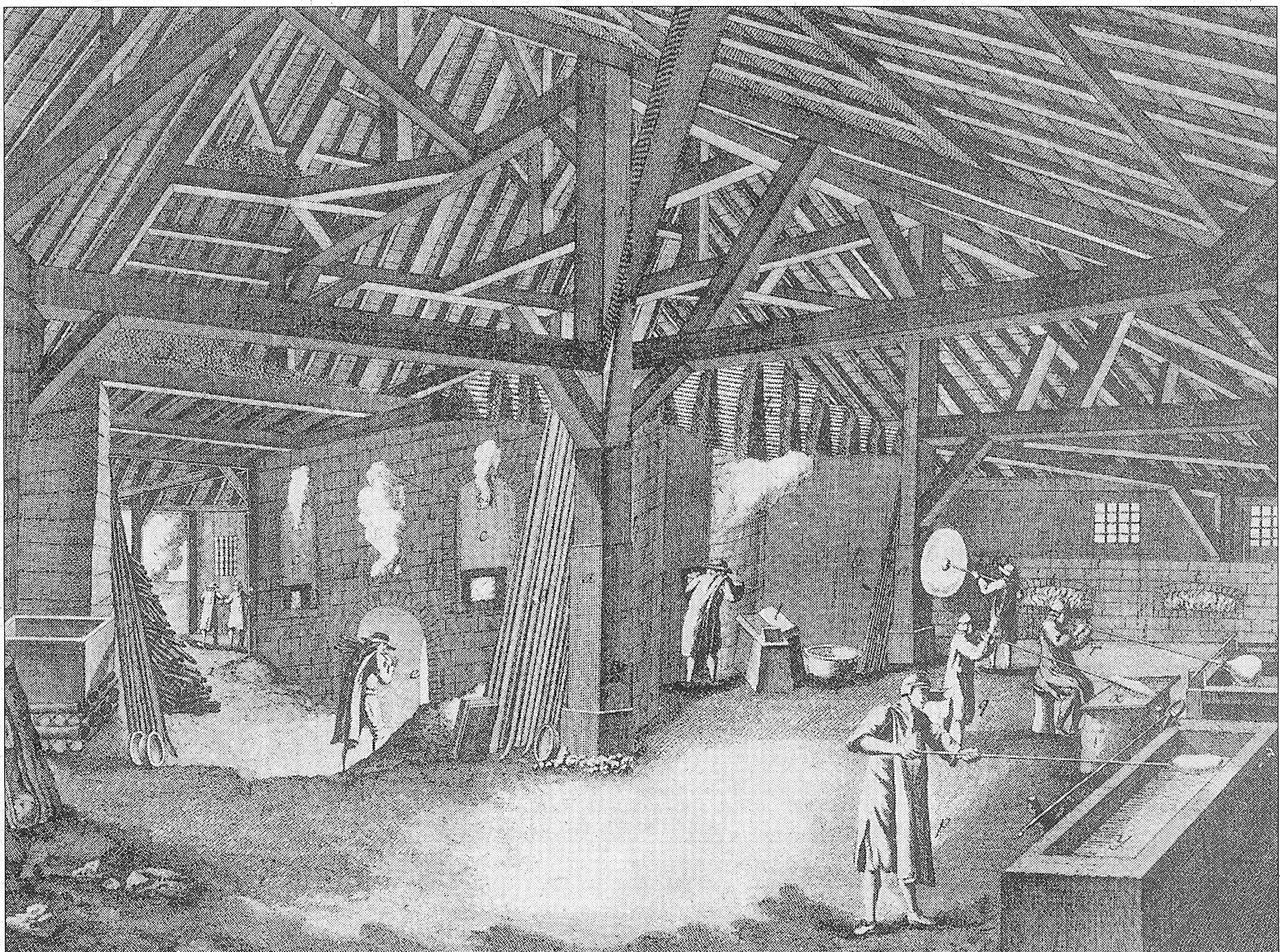
Weibersbrunn glass plant, founded in 1706 by Electoral Mainz mirror manufacturers, was the municipality's genesis.

According to official statistics, there were 52 workers on the social welfare contribution rolls working in producing businesses in 1998. In trade and transport this was 41. In other areas, 304 workers on the social welfare contribution rolls were employed, and 818 such workers worked from home. Nobody was employed in processing businesses. Two businesses were in construction, and furthermore, in 1999, there were as many agricultural operations.

== Attractions ==
Weibersbrunn is surrounded by "magnificent high forests". The nature preserve Rohrberg near Rohrbrunn was created in 1928 to protect old growth oak and beech trees. Southeast of Weibersbrunn lies the Naturwaldreservat Eichhall, another nature preserve.

== Government ==
=== Municipal council ===
The Weibersbrunn council is made up of 15 council members, counting the full-time mayor.

CSU	SPD	Total
2002	7	8	15 seats
2008	6	9	15 seats

(as at municipal election held on 2 March 2008)

=== Mayor ===
The mayor is Walter Schreck, in office since 2014.

=== Coat of arms ===
The municipality's arms might be described thus: Per fess, in chief per pale gules and sable, dexter a wheel spoked of six argent, sinister a mirror of the third framed Or, in base a spring walled of the third and masoned of the second with an open gate through which flows water azure.

The arms show above the fesswise (that is, horizontal) partition a six-spoked silver wheel – the Wheel of Mainz – on the dexter (armsbearer's right, viewer's left) side. This was the heraldic charge borne by the Archbishopric of Mainz, to which the municipality belonged until the Old Empire's downfall in 1803. It is also shown in Electoral Mainz's tinctures. On the sinister (armsbearer's left, viewer's right) side is a mirror symbolizing the glassworks established in the municipality in 1698 and in Rechtenbach and Lohr am Main. Archbishop Lothar Franz von Schönborn hired French glassmakers for this enterprise. Their plants made plate glass for mirrors. Glassmaking was ended between 1801 and 1803 in Rechtenbach and Lohr am Main, but only in 1864 in Weibersbrunn. The spring is a canting charge referring to the last syllable in the municipality's name – “spring” is Brunnen in German.

The municipality has borne the arms since 14 June 1971.

== Infrastructure ==
Weiberbrunn is located on the Bundesautobahn 3. There are two interchanges (Weibersbrunn and Rohrbrunn). The Bundesstrasse 8 used to pass through the municipal territory at Rohrbrunn and Echterspfahl. However, this stretch of the B8 was rededicated in 2007 and became Staatsstraße 2312. The A3 motorway today "replaces" the B8 between Marktheidenfeld and Aschaffenburg.

== Education ==
In 1999, the following institutions existed in Weibersbrunn:

- Kindergartens: 100 places with 72 children
- Primary school with 9 teachers and 166 pupils

== Notable people ==
- Ignaz Roth (1894–1972), German politician (SPD)
