= Hafenlohr (river) =

River in Germany

Hafenlohr Lohrbach (historic)
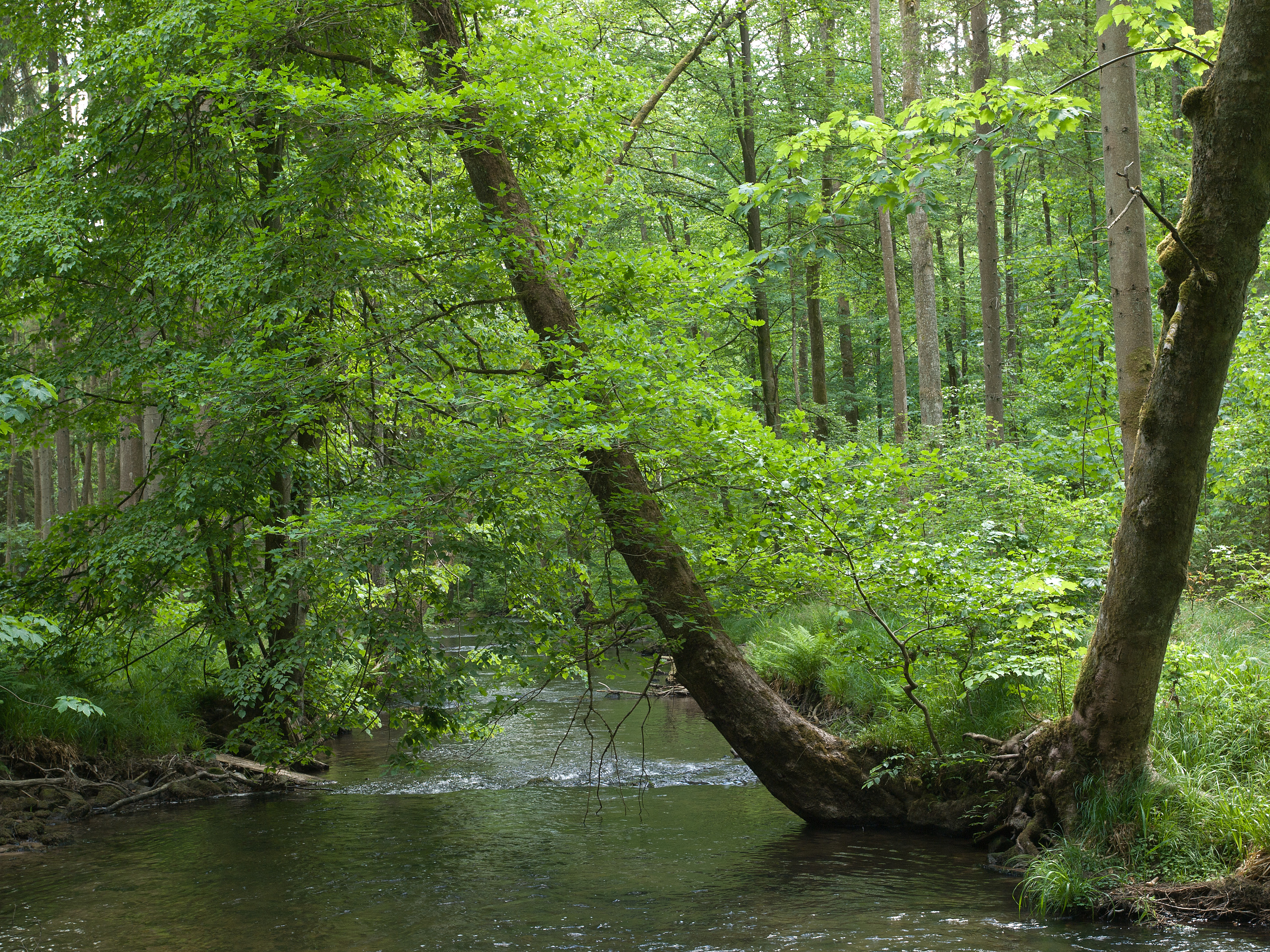
- The Hafenlohr at Windheim

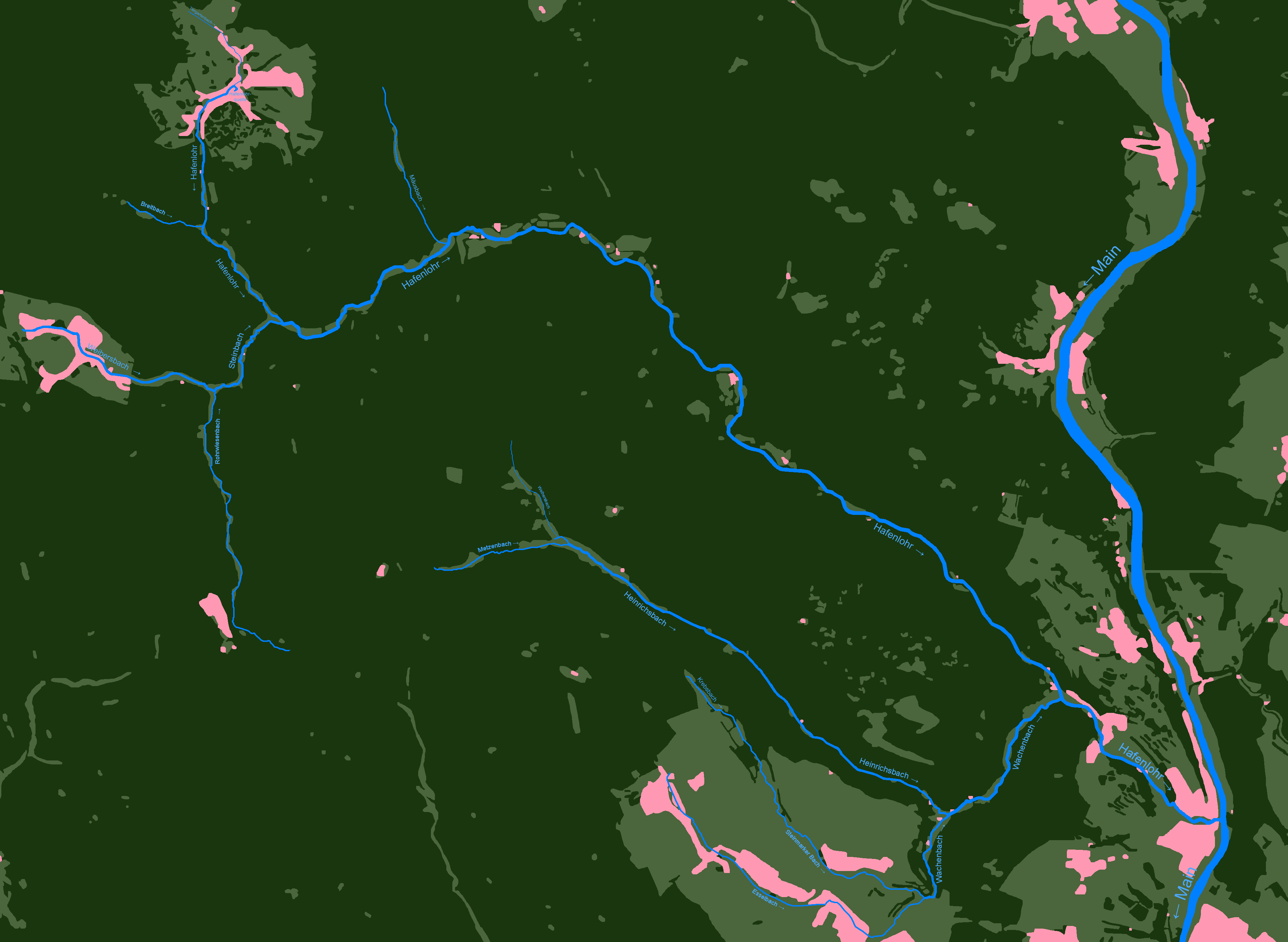
- The Hafenlohr watershed

Location
- Country: Germany
- State: Bavaria
- Region: Lower Franconia
- Districts: Main-Spessart and Aschaffenburg

Physical characteristics
- Source: Rothenbuch Castle
  - location: Rothenbuch, Aschaffenburg, Germany
  - coordinates: 49°58′3″N 9°23′52″E
  - elevation: 355 m (1,165 ft)
- Mouth: Main
  - location: Hafenlohr, Main-Spessart, Germany
  - coordinates: 49°52′6″N 9°36′16″E
  - elevation: 142 m (466 ft)
- Length: 27.7 km (17.2 mi)
- Basin size: 147 km^{2} (57 sq mi)
- Discharge
  - average: 1.74 m^{3}/s (61 cu ft/s)
  - maximum: 38.6 m^{3}/s (1,360 cu ft/s)

Basin features
- Progression: Main→ Rhine→ North Sea
- Tributaries
  - left: Mäusbach
  - right: Tiergartenbach, Breitbach, Steinbach, Wachenbach

Hafenlohr is a river of Bavaria, Germany. It is around 28 km (17 mi) long and discharges into the Main at the town of Hafenlohr. The Hafenlohr is located in the districts of Aschaffenburg and Main-Spessart in the Lower Franconia region.

The stream is known for its scenic valley, the Hafenlohrtal, and the eponymous nature preserve providing a habitat for many endangered plants and animals. In the past, for centuries the area was on the border between the territories of the Archbishop of Mainz and the Prince-Bishop of Würzburg. Past agricultural and industrial activities along the stream have been largely discontinued. Today, the area mainly offers recreation for hikers, bikers and other visitors. However, the Hafenlohr still feeds numerous ponds supporting fish farms and the forestry business of the nearby Fürstlich Löwensteinscher Park is located in the valley. A government project to turn most of the valley into a water reservoir by damming the Hafenlohr was abandoned in 2008 after decades of controversy.

== Etymology ==
The name Hafenlohr is derived from the Middle High German determiner word Havenaere (relating to Hafner or "potter"). Lohr is derived from the Celtic Lär meaning "broad" and "shallow". The river gives the town Hafenlohr its name, which has for centuries been a centre of the pottery trade using locally found clay.

== Course ==
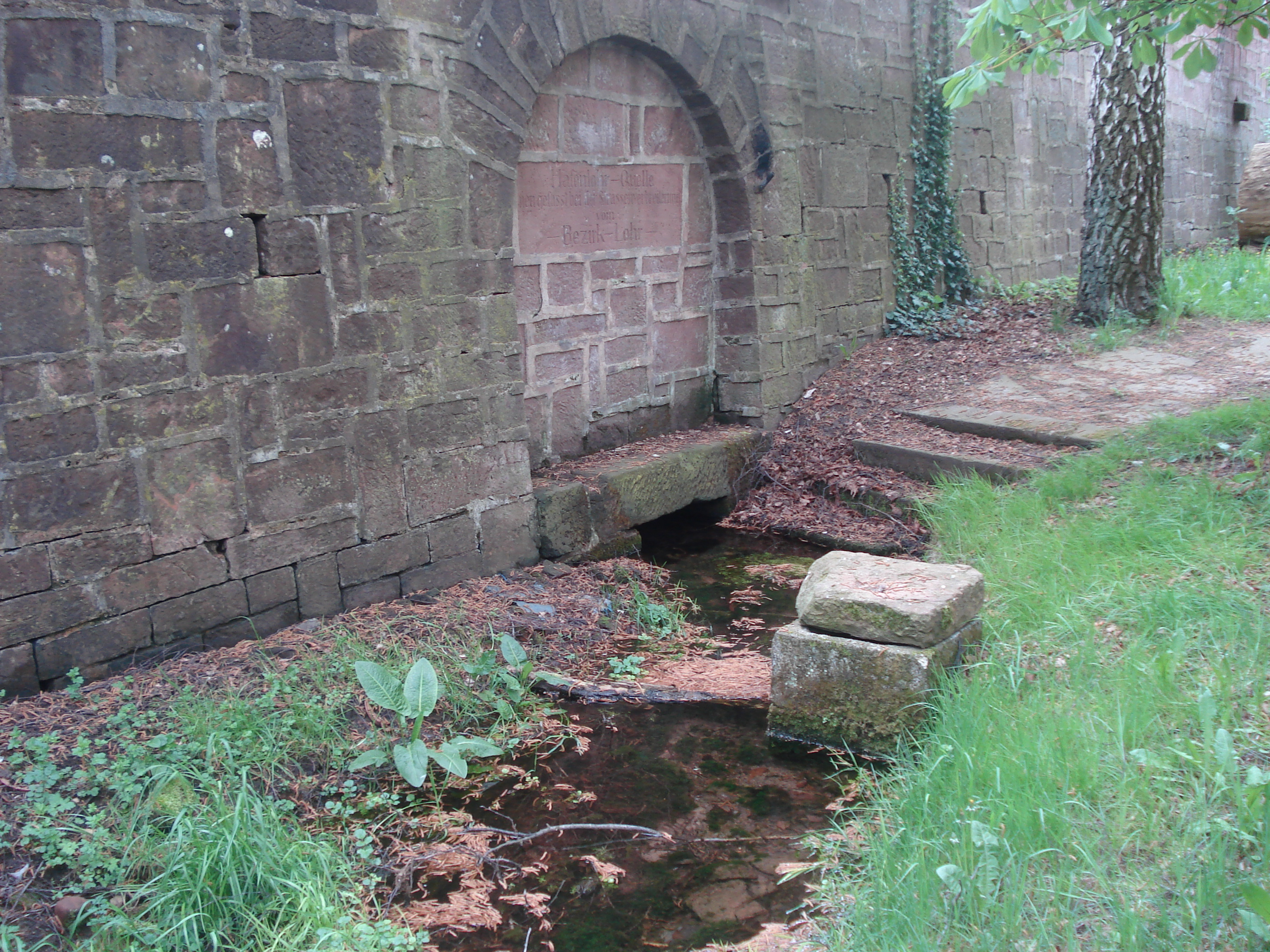
The source of the Hafenlohr

The Hafenlohrquelle (source of the Hafenlohr) is in the village of Rothenbuch, next to the wall of Rothenbuch Castle (Schloss Rothenbuch). It was set in sandstone when the road ST2317 was broadened.

The Hafenlohr flows through the castle moat and, after around 100 m, joins the Tiergartenbach which at that point is already 1.6 km long. However, since this rivulet often carries no water at all during the summer, it is not generally considered the main tributary. Flowing south out of Rothenbuch, the Hafenlohr is next joined by the Breitenbach. The Hafenlohr then continues to the southeast and at the Ahlmichdamm is joined by the Steinbach. It then turns east-northeast into a steep-sided valley without any larger settlements whose floor is the "Nature Preserve Hafenlohrtal". Before it reaches Rothenbuch-Lichtenau, the Hafenlohr is joined near the small Eichensee by the Mäusbach coming from the north-northwest. It then continues through the Lichtenauer Grund, passes several small ponds, and reaches the "Nature Preserve Mainzer Eck", where the valley starts to meander. The hill Klosterkuppel (552 m) blocks the Hafenlohr's now-easterly course, and it turns into its final direction towards the southeast at Rothenbuch-Erlenfurt.

The Hafenlohr then passes several forester's lodges, Alte and Neue Diana, Einsiedel, Lindenfurterhof, and goes on into an unspoilt natural valley bordered on the south by the Fürstlich Löwensteinscher Park, a large, privately owned woodland. Further downriver are the Forsthaus Fürstenbrücke and Hubertus (formerly known as Bahnbrückenmühle). At that point lies the youth camping site Windheim of the Main-Spessart district and the Hafenlohr is joined by its largest tributary by far, the Wachenbach (also known as Wagenbach) coming from the southwest. It then passes several small ponds fed by water from the Hafenlohr, crosses the town of Windheim as the valley widens, and then flows past the solitary hill Achtelsberg (235 m), formerly located within a meander of the river Main. The Hafenlohr now flows through the Große Au, past several more small ponds and through the Kleine Au, which is already bordered on the left and right by the outskirts of the town of Hafenlohr. Finally, it flows beneath the main street of Hafenlohr and at the town's eastern end discharges into the Main.

== Watershed ==
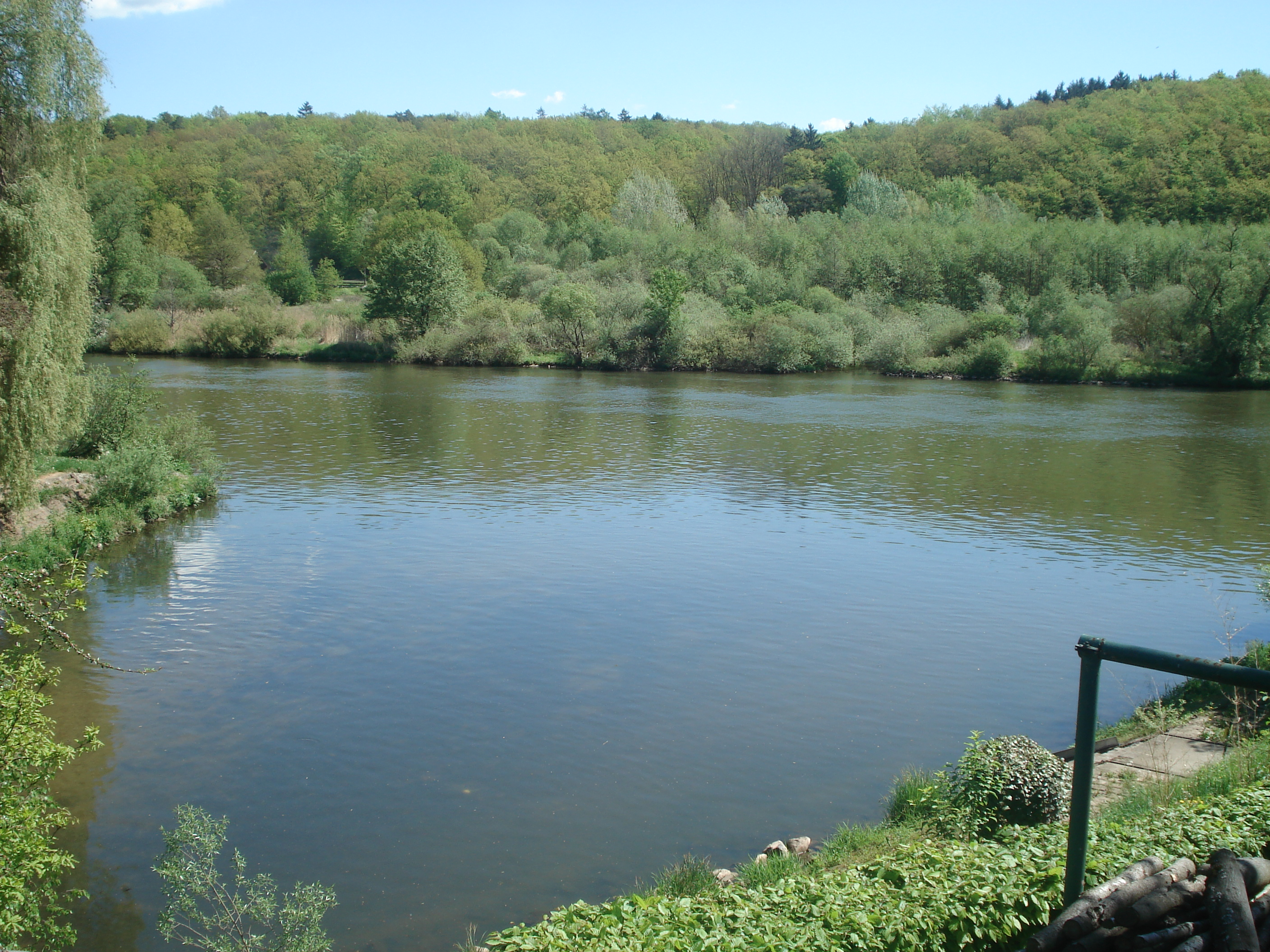
The mouth of the Hafenlohr

The Hafenlohr and its tributaries drain an area of around 147 square kilometres of mainly wooded hills and partially cleared valleys of the region known as Spessart. It is roughly bordered in the west by Weibersbrunn, Rothenbuch in the north, Bischbrunn and Esselbach in the south and Hafenlohr in the east. Geologically, the whole area is made of red sandstone.

=== Water quality ===
The water is classified as Güteklasse 1.

== Natural history ==
The Hafenlohrtal features two nature preserves. Most prominent is the "Oberes Hafenlohrtal", created in 1988. It covers around 71 hectares and stretches along a roughly 4 km long section of the valley from the Ahlmichdamm to Lichtenau. In this part of the valley, the Hafenlohr meanders through meadows of various degrees of wetness. These are kept clear of trees by regular mowing and by removing bushes.

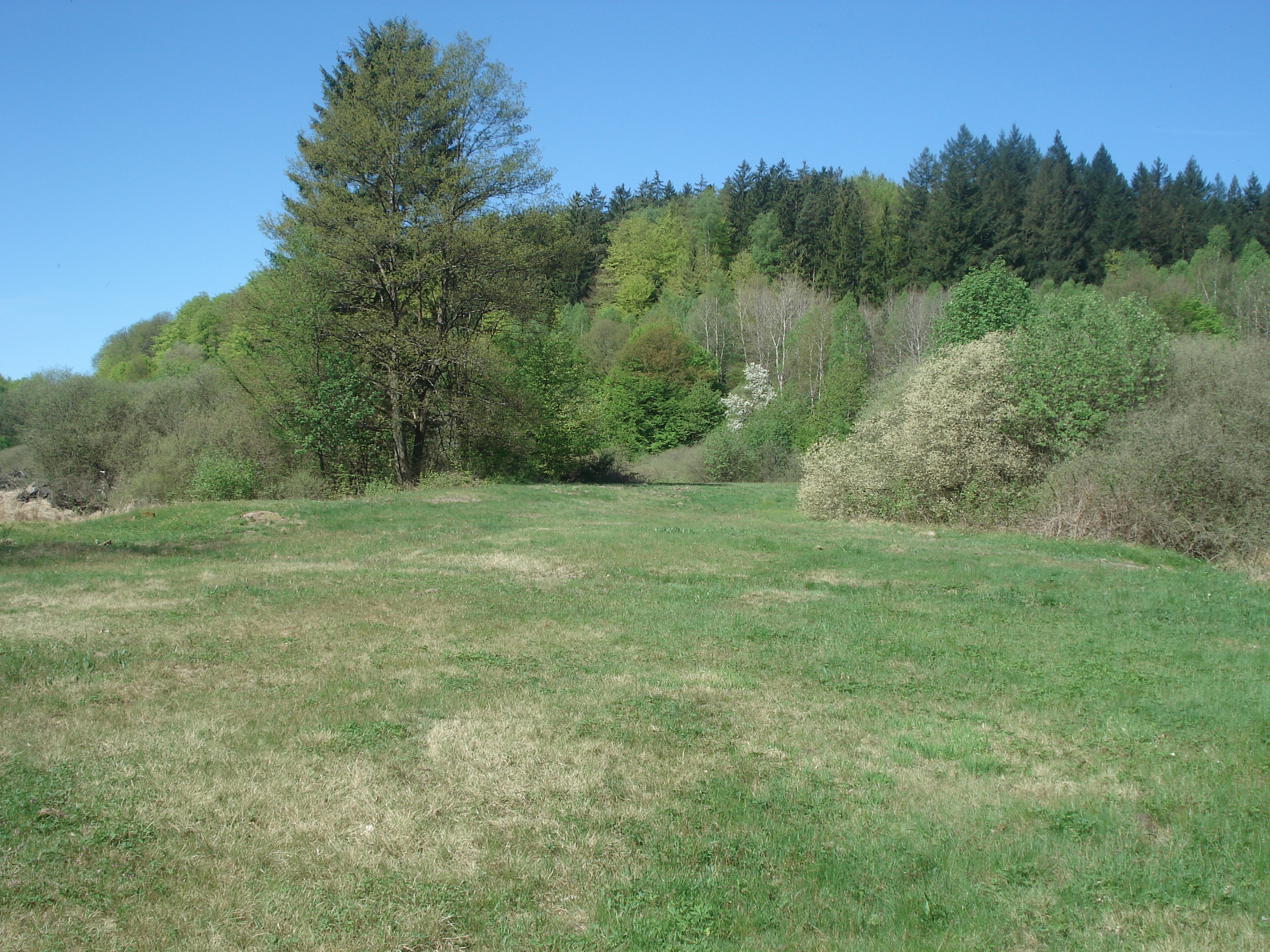
The Hafenlohrtal

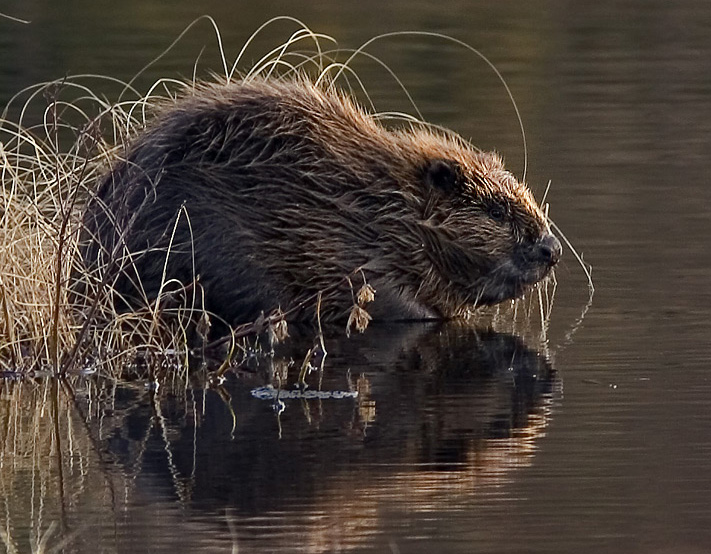
A Eurasian beaver

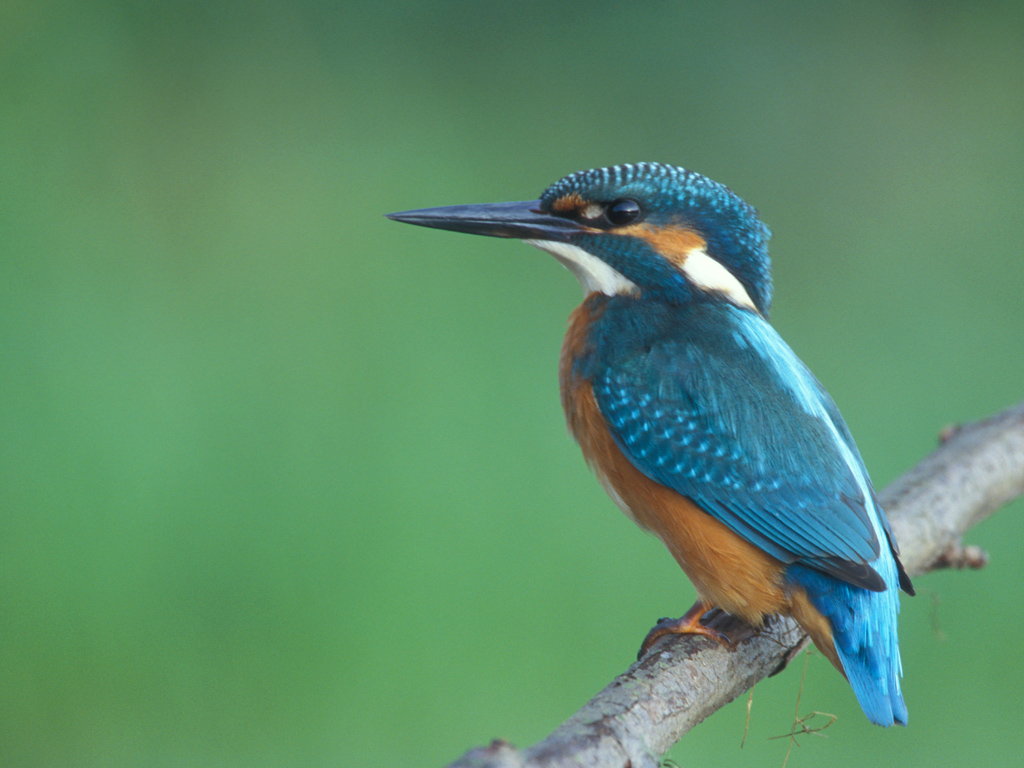
A kingfisher

This environment offers a habitat to a large number of plant and animal species. These include the beaver, which was reintroduced to the area.

18 species of birds that are on the IUCN Red List can be found in the Hafenlohrtal, including the kingfisher which nests in the valley and the European dipper. Other birds found along the stream are: common snipe, woodcock, corn crake, little grebe, gray heron, little owl, barn owl, hawk, Eurasian hobby, black kite, spotted woodpecker, whinchat, common warbler, common redstart, oriole and wryneck. Among the migratory birds stopping here is the osprey.

Fish living in the creek include various types of trout (brook trout, rainbow trout), grayling, European bullhead, spined loach, European brook lamprey and common nase. Several of these are also on the Red List.

The valley is also a habitat for numerous amphibians and reptiles: alpine newt, palmate newt, common water frog, common toad, fire salamander, grass frog, marsh frog, blindworm, grass snake, and common lizard.

Although the Spessart in general does not boast great diversity of species of trees, there are more than twenty varieties of trees in the valley.

After 1945, the irrigated meadows lost their economic importance and were planted with spruce monoculture, a tree inappropriate to the local environment, on a significant scale, especially downriver of Erlenfurt. In 2007 to 2009, around 10 hectares of spruce forest was removed by logging. The area is now kept clear of trees by goats or cattle. Among the animals used for the purpose are water buffalo. Where the terrain is too wet for grazing, wetland forests of mixed hardwood trees are being created.

== History ==
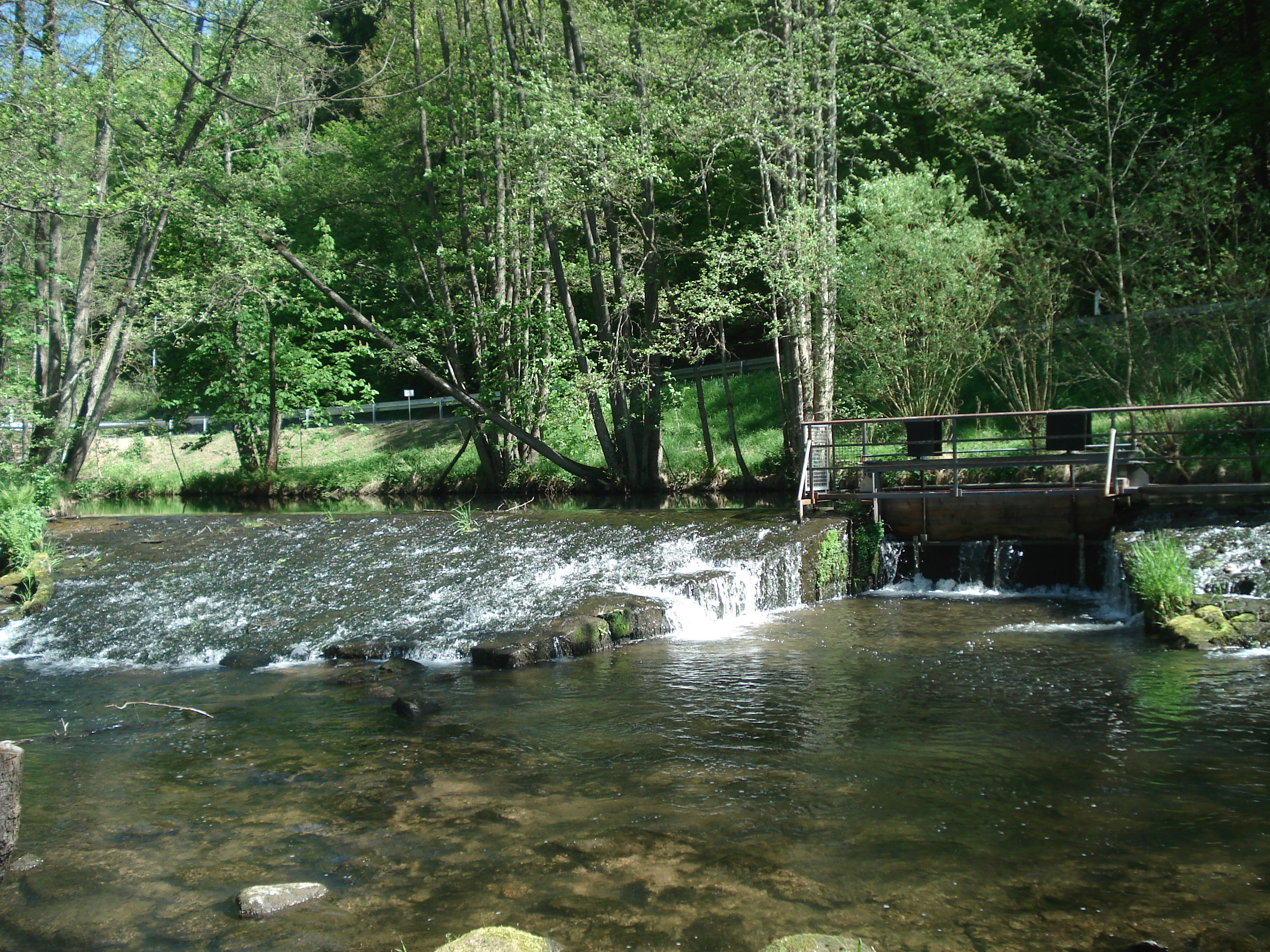
A weir on the Hafenlohr

Today's appearance of the Hafenlohrtal is due to hundreds of years of human interaction with nature. The water of the stream powered paper and saw mills, supplied glass foundries, meadows and fish ponds, helped create electricity and supplied drinking water for men and beasts.

In the Hafenlohrtal the territories of two powerful ecclesial princes met: the Archbishop of Mainz and the Prince-Bishop of Würzburg. The former's sphere of influence extended via his holdings in Aschaffenburg into the area, whilst the latter had acquired the properties of the Benedictine abbey Kloster Neustadt am Main in the late 10th century.

Until the end of the 19th century, firewood from the Spessart was rafted down the stream (which was dammed for the purpose in places) to Hafenlohr where it was loaded on ships. From the 19th century through the mid-20th century, the meadows of the Hafenlohrtal were irrigated by a system of artificial streams, some of which remain today.

Following the stream's course from origin to mouth:

- Rothenbuch: The spring from which the Hafenlohr originates, is presumed to have been a meeting point for medieval hunters. Rothenbuch was first mentioned in written documents in 1318. In 1342, construction of a hunting lodge for the Archbishop of Mainz began and the spring was used to fill the castle moat with water. Later trout ponds were added. Rothenbuch was the local seat of the Archbishop's forest administration, which was also in charge of supervising the glass foundries in the area and the use of wood by the local population. The around 20 men working for the administration were also responsible for supplying game to the court at Aschaffenburg and organising hunts within the Spessart. In 1485, the Forstmeister of the Spessart moved his seat from Aschaffenburg to Rothenbuch. From here the rafting of firewood down the Hafenlohr—through the territory of the rival Bishop of Würzburg—was organised. Today's castle structure partially dates to 1567 and was built as a hunting lodge for the Archbishop of Mainz Daniel Brendel von Homburg. It was expanded in the late 17th century.
- At Lichtenau the lands owned by Mainz and Würzburg met. To secure the border, in 1462 the Echter family, feudal retainers of the Archbishop of Mainz, established a stud farm at Lichtenau. However, the fief was soon integrated into the direct property of the Archbishopry and became a stud farm raising horses for the Archbishop's stables. From 1657 to 1790 it was the official Staatsgestüt for the Erzstift Mainz, property of the Archbishop. However, after 1775 the closure of the stud was considered due to high costs. In 1813, it was acquired under Erbpacht by the Rexroth brothers who installed a hammer mill. After the Rexroths moved to Lohr in 1850, activity here was reduced. The mill was finally closed in 1871. In 1896, Julius Rexroth sold the property to the Eich brothers of next door Hoher Knuck. Initially used only for agriculture, they later opened a tavern and hotel which is still in operation. In 1927, journalist and writer Kurt Tucholsky stopped here whilst on a walking tour of the region and commented very favourably on the experience in his writing. Today, the border between the two administrative districts of Aschaffenburg and Main-Spessart still follows the old territorial borders and after running parallel to it for a while the Hafenlohr passes it at Erlenfurt (see below).
- Erlenfurt marks the boundary between two dialects: Rhine Franconian and Main-Franconian. It also borders the area known as Haderwald ("Forest of Strife"), subject of 200 years of strife between the Prince-Bishops of Mainz and Würzburg that ended in 1583.
- Einsiedel was founded in 1260 as a hermitage named "Ryffendal" by one Frater Radnoldus. In 1264 it became a priory of the Benedictine abbey Neustadt am Main. In 1483, it was transformed into a dependent farmstead and leased out. After Einsiedel became property of the family of Löwenstein-Wertheim-Rosenberg in the secularization of 1803, glass was manufactured here (1807–1889). Although the foundry Karlshütte has since been torn down, dating back to the time of industrial production here (the glass foundry had up to 50 employees) is the neogothic church, constructed in 1866 by Princess Sophie Löwenstein-Wertheim-Rosenberg. Since 1977, Einsiedel has been the centre of the local forestry business of the Löwenstein Estate.
- The Lindenfurter Hof was mentioned for the first time in 1264 and belonged to the Kloster Neustadt. Until 1790 it served as a stud farm for the Bishop of Würzburg. From 1850 to 1977 the administration of the Löwenstein forestry and game business was located here. Today it is leased out by the Löwenstein Estate.
- Hafenlohr was mentioned first in 1324 but its origins (and those of Windheim just to the north west) probably go back to around the year 1000. It was a centre of the pottery industry. The area was property of the Kloster Neustadt since the late 8th century. From the mid-12th century it belonged to the Counts of Rieneck until their male line died out in 1333 and the property reverted to the Hochstift of the Bishop of Würzburg.

== Economy ==
From 1978 to 2008, the Bavarian government considered building a dam in the valley of the Hafenlohr and use the stored water as a supply of drinking water. This would have created a 15 km long lake in the valley, covering about 250 hectares, and resulted in the destruction of roughly 300 hectares of forest. After decades of protests by local residents, environmentalists and other groups the plan was finally shelved in September 2008.

Today, tourism plays a role in the local economy, with several establishments in the Hafenlohrtal providing gastronomical services including accommodation, such as the Schlosshotel Rothenbuch, Gasthaus im Hochspessart and Hoher Knuck. There are also active fish farms (trout) at the ponds of Erlenfurt and Lindenfurterhof. The Löwenstein Estate conducts forestry business in the area, although the Estate's administrative headquarters is in Amorbach.

=== Recreation ===
The area provides numerous signposted paths for biking and hiking. The nature preserve Hafenlohrtal was originally off-limits to visitors but since 2004 has been opened up by a looping path of around 3 km that includes a boardwalk leading into the valley and crossing the stream on a small wooden bridge. The most prominent trail is the "European Culture Trail Hafenlohrtal", set up as part of the project "Pathways to Cultural Landscapes" supported by the European Union.

== See also ==
- List of rivers of Bavaria
