= Carl F. Brand =

American historian (1892–1981)

- Born: Carl Fremont Brand; October 8, 1892; Greenfield, Indiana, U.S.
- Died: March 27, 1981 (aged 88)
- Education: Indiana University Bloomington
- Occupation: Historian
- Spouse: Nan Alwilda Surface (m. 1930)
- Children: 3
- Parent(s): Charles Samuel Brand; Jessie Fremont Davis

Carl Fremont Brand (October 8, 1892 – March 27, 1981) was an American historian. He was a professor of history at Stanford University for thirty-four years, and was one of the leading American authorities on the history of the British Labour Party. His books, British Labour's Rise to Power (1941) and The British Labour Party (1964), are regarded as definitive works in this field. He built the Hoover Institution's collection of Labour Party documents, long recognized as the finest collection outside of the United Kingdom.

== Early life and education ==
Brand was born in Greenfield, Indiana. He was the only child of Charles Samuel Brand, a glass worker, and Jessie Fremont Davis, a homemaker, musician and artist, whose name reflected her family's admiration of General John C. Fremont and his wife, Jessie. The first member of his family to go to college, Carl received a degree from Indiana University Bloomington in 1915, where he was elected to Phi Beta Kappa. Although he majored in history, he was a teaching assistant in music during his senior year. He served as director of the Marching Hundred, the famous Big Ten marching band, in which he played the clarinet. In 1914 he became Chief Musician, with the rank of sergeant, when the band was mustered into the Indiana National Guard. In 1916 the band, including Carl, was sent to the Mexican Border following Pancho Villa's raid.

== Career ==
Brand earned a master's degree in 1916. His thesis, "The Know-Nothing Party in Indiana," was later published serially in the Indiana Magazine of History (1922), and is still cited by scholars today. After teaching high school for a year, he began to study for a Ph.D. in English history at Harvard University under Professor C. H. McIlwain. He also studied with Frederick Jackson Turner, Sidney B. Wayne, Robert Howard Lord, and Harold Laski. After teaching at Smith College he traveled to Europe to research his dissertation, The Movement for Parliamentary Reform in England 1832-67 (1923) at the British Museum and the London School of Economics. In London he met and was influenced by R. H. Tawney, and Sidney Webb and Beatrice Webb, as well as, once again, Harold Laski, who had returned to London after having been dismissed from Harvard for supporting the Boston Police Strike.

For three years Brand was an instructor in English history at the University of Michigan at Ann Arbor. In 1924 he became an assistant professor at Stanford teaching English history, then an associate professor in 1930 and a professor in 1940. He retired from Stanford in 1958, after thirty-four years. He was proud that he had taught at Stanford for half of its existence.

== Oriental rug collection ==
On a month-long visit to Istanbul in 1928, Brand began what was to become a lifelong collection of oriental rugs. While exploring the bazaar, he made the acquaintance of Rudolf Riefstahl, the American pioneer in the appreciation of Turkish and Persian rugs for their artistic value. Also advised by another early American expert, Arthur Upham Pope, Brand concentrated on Turkish and Persian, as well as Caucasian and Turkmen carpets, handmade before the use of aniline dyes. He eventually acquired a collection of many dozens at its greatest extent. Large bales purchased for relatively small amounts of money would arrive in California still redolent of the camels that had transported them in Persia and Turkey. One noteworthy prayer rug from Dagestan had a woven-in date equivalent to 1814/15 AD. Rare embroidered Uzbekistan Susanis made by young girls for their bridal chests have appreciated in value.

== Personal life ==
In 1930 Brand was married to Nan Alwilda Surface, the daughter of Dr. Frank M. Surface, a director under Herbert Hoover in the Department of Commerce, and later an executive with Standard Oil of New Jersey (now part of ExxonMobil). The Brands had three sons, Charles in 1932, Robert in 1934, and Donald in 1937.

During World War II, the family sent some 1,600 bundles of food and clothing, collected from students and friends, to Britain over six years. Their home near the Stanford campus became known as a center of hospitality for holiday parties. Great effort was put into the creation of a locally famous garden, noted especially for its roses. Many years later the property was sold to the physicist Edward Teller.

Professor Brand died at Stanford University Hospital in 1981 after a brief illness. He was 88 years old.

== Selected bibliography ==
"The History of the Know Nothing Party in Indiana," The Indiana Magazine of History (1922) 18: 47–81, 177–206, 266–306. JSTOR

"The Conversion of the British Trade-Unions to Political Action," The American Historical Review (1925) 30: 251–270. http://ahr.oxfordjournals.org/content/by/year

"Peace Programmes of the British Labor Party," (Also known as "The War Aims and Peace Programs of British Labor"), Proceedings of the Pacific Coast Branch of the American Historical Association January 1926: 62–72.

"An Early Nineteenth Century View of Magna Carta," The American Historical Review (1927) 32: 793–794. http://ahr.oxfordjournals.org/content/by/year

"British Labor and the War-Time Coalitions," The American Historical Review (April 1930) 35: 522–541. http://ahr.oxfordjournals.org/content/by/year

"The Reaction of British Labor to the Polices of President Wilson During the World War," The American Historical Review (January 1933) 38: 263–285. http://ahr.oxfordjournals.org/content/by/year

"British Labour and the International during the World War," Journal of Modern History (March 1936) 8: 40–63. JSTOR

"The Attitude of British Labor Toward President Wilson During the Peace Conference," The American Historical Review (January 1937) 42: 244–255. http://ahr.oxfordjournals.org/content/by/year

British Labor's Rise to Power: Eight Studies, The Hoover Library on War, Revolution, and Peace, Publication No. 17. (Stanford, CA: Stanford University Press, 1941.) 305 pp.

"British Labor and Soviet Russia," The South Atlantic Quarterly 48 (1949), 329–340.

"Democracy in Great Britain," Pacific Historical Review 19 (May 1950) 113–126. Presidential Address to the Pacific Coast Branch of the American Historical Association, read at Mills College, December 1949. Reprinted, without notes, in R.L.Schuyler and H. Ausubel, ed., The Making of English History (New York, The Dryden Press, 1952), 677–686.

"The British General Election of 1950," The South Atlantic Quarterly 50 (1951), 478–498.

"The British General Election of 1951," The South Atlantic Quarterly 52 (1953), 29–53.

"Britain's Solution of the Problem of Empire," The South Atlantic Quarterly 53 (1954), 313–326.

"British Conservatism and Social Politics," The South Atlantic Quarterly 54 (1955), 11–28.

"The British General Election of 1955," The South Atlantic Quarterly 55 (1956), 289–312.

"The British Labor Party and Nationalization," The South Atlantic Quarterly 58 (1959), 153–166.

"The British General Election of 1959," The South Atlantic Quarterly 59 (1960), 521–542.

The British Labour Party: A Short History. Stanford, CA: Stanford University Press, 1964. 340 pp. Revised Ed. (Stanford, CA: Hoover Institution Press, 1974), 424 pp.

"The British General Election of 1964," The South Atlantic Quarterly 64 (1965), 332–350.

"The British General Election of 1966," The South Atlantic Quarterly 66 (1967), 129–147.

"The British General Election of 1970," The South Atlantic Quarterly 70 (1971), 350–364.
