= List of Kappa Kappa Psi chapters =

Kappa Kappa Psi is an honorary fraternity for college and university band members in the United States. It was founded on November 27, 1919, at Oklahoma Agricultural and Mechanical College, now known as Oklahoma State University. Over 340 chapters have been established and are organized into six separate districts.

There are several statuses that chapters of Kappa Kappa Psi can hold: active, inactive, investigative hold, probation, and suspension. Active chapters are required to pay dues and fees on time, submit required reports on time, comply with the national constitution, and adhere to national risk management policies. Probation is applied to chapters by the National Council upon due cause, and allows chapters to meet and conduct activities as normal unless otherwise directed by their terms. Generally, chapters are placed on probation for failing to submit required paperwork.

Suspension is reserved for serious allegations of policy violations or chapters that are frequently delinquent with paperwork. All chapter activities and functions are halted pending investigation, and after the investigation concludes, the chapter may only meet with the approval of the chapter sponsor and national president, and attendance of the chapter sponsor. If chapters continue to fail to follow the policies of the fraternity or are found to have violated the fraternity's hazing policy, the National Council may revoke the chapter's charter. Remaining collegiate members of the chapter may be expelled from the fraternity in a charter revocation. In the event of a charter revocation, the national fraternity takes measures to reclaim the chapter's charter and other fraternal regalia and equipment.

Chapters that become too small to effectively function may be placed on inactive status by the National Council. This status relieves all financial obligations of the chapter to National Headquarters and removes the chapter's voting rights at all conventions and the right to initiate members. Remaining collegiate members of the chapter are transferred to alumni membership. Any chapter that is inactive, either by charter revocation or by the above method, may be reinstated by national headquarters after inspection by the national council and a successful petition that meets the requirements of a new chapter.

== Chapters ==
In the following list, active chapters are indicated in bold and inactive chapters are in italics.

Chapter	Charter date and range	Institution	Location	District	Status	Ref.
**Alpha**	November 27, 1919	Oklahoma State University	Stillwater, Oklahoma	Southwest	Active	
**Beta**	December 17, 1920	Montana State University	Bozeman, Montana	Midwest	Active	
**Gamma**	December 16, 1920 – 19xx ?; July 10, 1993	University of Washington	Seattle, Washington	Western	Active	
**Delta**	May 21, 1921	University of Oklahoma	Norman, Oklahoma	Southwest	Active	
**Epsilon**	April 20, 1923 – 19xx ?; April 20, 1994	Mississippi State University	Starkville, Mississippi	Southeast	Active	
Zeta	April 25, 1923 – 19xx ?	Pennsylvania State University	State College, Pennsylvania	Northeast	Inactive	
**Eta**	April 26, 1923	Ohio State University	Columbus, Ohio	North Central	Active	
**Theta**	May 12, 1923 – 1944, 1947-1972 ?; January 3, 2009	Oregon State University	Corvallis, Oregon	Western	Active	
**Iota**	April 21, 1924	Georgia Tech	Atlanta, Georgia	Southeast	Active	
**Kappa**	May 31, 1924 – xxxx ?	Colorado State University	Fort Collins, Colorado	Midwest	Colony	(Note: After going inactive, the chapter was reformed as a colony on April 23, 2023.)
**Lambda**	June 5, 1924	University of Arkansas	Fayetteville, Arkansas	Southwest	Active	
Mu	May 31, 1925 – xxxx ?	University of North Dakota	Grand Forks, North Dakota	Midwest	Inactive	
**Nu**	June 12, 1925	University of Michigan	Ann Arbor, Michigan	North Central	Active	
**Xi**	November 21, 1925	Colorado School of Mines	Golden, Colorado	Midwest	Active	
**Omicron**	June 17, 1926	West Virginia University	Morgantown, West Virginia	Northeast	Active	
**Pi**	May 18, 1926– 19xx ?; June 6, 1992	Auburn University	Auburn, Alabama	Southeast	Active	
**Rho**	October 18, 1926 – 19xx ?; February 20, 2010	Tulane University	New Orleans, Louisiana	Southwest	Active	
**Sigma**	May 23, 1927	Ohio Northern University	Ada, Ohio	North Central	Active	
Tau	June 2, 1928 – 19xx ?	University of Montana	Missoula, Montana	Midwest	Inactive	
Upsilon	June 11, 1928 – xxxx ?	University of Cincinnati	Cincinnati, Ohio	North Central	Inactive	
Phi	March 20, 1929 – 19xx ?	Stanford University	Palo Alto, California	Western	Inactive	
Chi	April 20, 1929 – 19xx ?	University of California, Berkeley	Berkeley, California	Western	Inactive	
**Psi**	May 4, 1929	University of California, Los Angeles	Los Angeles, California	Western	Active	
Omega	May 7, 1929 – xxxx ?	University of Arizona	Tucson, Arizona	Western	Inactive	
**Alpha Alpha**	May 24, 1929 – xxxx ?; October 25, 2014	University of Nevada	Reno, Nevada	Western	Probation	
**Alpha Beta**	May 31, 1929 – 19xx ?; April 2, 1977	Butler University	Indianapolis, Indiana	North Central	Active	
Alpha Gamma	June 2, 1929 – xxxx ?	Duke University	Durham, North Carolina	Southeast	Inactive	
**Alpha Delta**	May 17, 1931	Ohio University	Athens, Ohio	North Central	Active	
Alpha Epsilon	May 21, 1931 – 19xx ?; March 25, 1987 – xxxx ?	Temple University	Philadelphia, Pennsylvania	Northeast	Inactive	
**Alpha Zeta**	May 27, 1931	Indiana University	Bloomington, Indiana	North Central	Active	
**Alpha Eta**	May 25, 1931	University of Florida	Gainesville, Florida	Southeast	Active	
**Alpha Theta**	June 6, 1931	University of Northern Colorado	Greeley, Colorado	Midwest	Active	
**Alpha Iota**	June 7, 1931	University of Colorado	Boulder, Colorado	Midwest	Active	
Alpha Kappa	December 4, 1933 – 19xx ?; April 25, 1992 – xxxx ?	George Washington University	Washington, D.C.	Northeast	Inactive	
Alpha Lambda	June 8, 1934	University of Denver	Denver, Colorado	Midwest	Inactive	
Alpha Mu	May 5, 1935	North Dakota State University	Fargo, North Dakota	Midwest	Inactive	
**Alpha Nu**	May 12, 1935 – 19xx ?; April 14, 1967	University of Wyoming	Laramie, Wyoming	Midwest	Active	
Alpha Xi	December 14, 1935 – xxxx ?	Stetson University	DeLand, Florida	Southeast	Inactive	
**Alpha Omicron**	March 12, 1938	Texas Tech University	Lubbock, Texas	Southwest	Active	
Alpha Pi	March 18, 1938 – xxxx ?	University of Tulsa	Tulsa, Oklahoma	Southwest	Inactive	
**Alpha Rho**	May 2, 1938	Northeastern State University	Tahlequah, Oklahoma	Southwest	Active	
**Alpha Sigma**	May 11, 1941 – xxxx ?; May 19, 2011	University of Tampa	Tampa, Florida	Southeast	Active	
**Alpha Tau**	May 18, 1940	University of Texas at Austin	Austin, Texas	Southwest	Active	
Alpha Upsilon	April 11, 1942 – 19xx ?; June 18, 1972 – xxxx ?	University of Southern California	Los Angeles, California	Western	Inactive	
Alpha Phi	April 16, 1942 – 1972	Rutgers University–New Brunswick	New Brunswick, New Jersey	Northeast	Inactive	(Note: The Alpha Phi chapter had its charter revoked and reorganized as Mu Upsilon Alpha (local), which became a chapter of Mu Beta Psi in 2007.)
**Alpha Chi**	April 5, 1947	University of Texas at El Paso	El Paso, Texas	Southwest	Active	
**Alpha Psi**	October 25, 1947	West Texas A&M University	Canyon, Texas	Southwest	Active	
**Alpha Omega**	February 14, 1948 – 1978; April 14, 1996	University of Pittsburgh	Pittsburgh, Pennsylvania	Northeast	Active	
**Beta Alpha**	February 14, 1948	Baylor University	Waco, Texas	Southwest	Active	
Beta Beta	April 26, 1948 – 19xx ?; February 23, 1974 – xxxx ?	University of Mississippi	Oxford, Mississippi	Southeast	Inactive	
**Beta Gamma**	May 16, 1948	Louisiana State University	Baton Rouge, Louisiana	Southwest	Active	
Beta Delta	May 15, 1948– xxxx ?	Sam Houston State University	Huntsville, Texas	Southwest	Inactive	
**Beta Epsilon**	November 7, 1948 – 19xx ?; April 26, 2025	University of South Dakota	Vermillion, South Dakota	Midwest	Active	
Beta Zeta	February 11, 1949– 19xx ?	Long Island University	Brooklyn, New York	Northeast	Inactive	
Beta Eta	March 20, 1949– 19xx ?	University of Tennessee	Knoxville, Tennessee	Southeast	Inactive	
Beta Theta	April 30, 1949 – xxxx ?	University of Utah	Salt Lake City, Utah	Western	Inactive	
Beta Iota	April 23, 1949 – 19xx ?	Nebraska Wesleyan University	Lincoln, Nebraska	Midwest	Inactive	
**Beta Kappa**	April 17, 1949	Bowling Green State University	Bowling Green, Ohio	North Central	Active	
**Beta Lambda**	May 8, 1949	Eastern New Mexico University	Portales, New Mexico	Southwest	Active	
Beta Mu	May 30, 1949 – 19xx ?	Emory University	Atlanta, Georgia	Southeast	Inactive	
Beta Nu	December 19, 1949 – xxxx ?	VanderCook College of Music	Chicago, Illinois	North Central	Inactive	
Beta Xi	December 4, 1949 – xxxx ?	Sul Ross State University	Alpine, Texas	Southwest	Inactive	
**Beta Omicron**	November 13, 1949	Arizona State University	Tempe, Arizona	Western	Active	
Beta Pi	December 17, 1949 – 19xx ?; May 13, 1967 – xxxx ?	Drury University	Springfield, Missouri	Midwest	Inactive	
**Beta Rho**	January 15, 1950 – 19xx ?; April 1, 1990	University of Toledo	Toledo, Ohio	North Central	Active	
**Beta Sigma**	January 21, 1950	University of Houston	Houston, Texas	Southwest	Active	
**Beta Tau**	January 19, 1950	Wichita State University	Wichita, Kansas	Midwest	Probation	
Beta Upsilon	March 25, 1950 – 19xx ?	Abilene Christian University	Abilene, Texas	Southwest	Inactive	
Beta Phi	March 25, 1950 – 19xx ?	Southern Methodist University	Dallas, Texas	Southwest	Inactive	
**Beta Chi**	September 23, 1950 – xxxx ?; April 23, 2005	University of Virginia	Charlottesville, Virginia	Northeast	Active	
**Beta Psi**	February 25, 1951	Kent State University	Kent, Ohio	North Central	Active	
Beta Omega	May 20, 1951 – 19xx ?	Case Western Reserve University	Cleveland, Ohio	North Central	Inactive	
**Gamma Alpha**	May 5, 1951 – xxxx ?; February 22, 2009	Midwestern State University	Wichita Falls, Texas	Southwest	Probation	
Gamma Beta	May 3, 1952 – xxxx ?	Brigham Young University–Idaho	Rexburg, Idaho	Western	Inactive	
Gamma Gamma	May 22, 1952 – xxxx ?	Oklahoma Panhandle State University	Goodwell, Oklahoma	Southwest	Inactive	
**Gamma Delta**	March 21, 1953 – 19xx ?; October 26, 1967	Wayne State College	Wayne, Nebraska	Midwest	Active	
Gamma Epsilon	May 30, 1953	Hobart College	Geneva, New York	Northeast	Inactive	
**Gamma Zeta**	March 18, 1954 – 19xx ?; May 14, 1985	Lamar University	Beaumont, Texas	Southwest	Active	
**Gamma Eta**	May 16, 1954 – xxxx ?; November 15, 2015	New Mexico State University	Las Cruces, New Mexico	Southwest	Active	
**Gamma Theta**	May 9, 1954 – 19xx ?; October 3, 1985	East Central University	Ada, Oklahoma	Southwest	Active	
**Gamma Iota**	May 23, 1954 – 19xx ?; May 15, 1999	University of New Mexico	Albuquerque, New Mexico	Southwest	Active	
**Gamma Kappa**	May 9, 1954	Northern Arizona University	Flagstaff, Arizona	Western	Active	
Gamma Lambda	May 16, 1954 – 19xx ?; February 6, 1971	Doane College	Crete, Nebraska	Midwest	Inactive	
Gamma Mu	June 5, 1954 – xxxx ?	University of Pennsylvania	Philadelphia, Pennsylvania	Northeast	Inactive	
**Gamma Nu**	May 14, 1955	Florida State University	Tallahassee, Florida	Southeast	Active	
**Gamma Xi**	May 14, 1955 – xxxx ?;, November 16, 2025	University of Maryland, College Park	College Park, Maryland	Northeast	Active	
**Gamma Omicron**	January 31, 1956 – xxxx ?; February 26, 2011	Otterbein University	Westerville, Ohio	North Central	Active	
**Gamma Pi**	March 18, 1956	Purdue University	West Lafayette, Indiana	North Central	Active	
Gamma Rho	June 1, 1956 – xxxx ?	New Mexico Highlands University	Las Vegas, New Mexico	Southwest	Inactive	
**Gamma Sigma**	February 9, 1957	Texas Christian University	Fort Worth, Texas	Southwest	Active	
Gamma Tau	April 6, 1957 – xxxx ?	Lycoming College	Williamsport, Pennsylvania	Northeast	Inactive	
Gamma Upsilon	May 19, 1957 – xxxx ?; May 18, 1969	Ohio Wesleyan University	Delaware, Ohio	North Central	Inactive	
**Gamma Phi**	May 1, 1957 – 19xx ?; March 23, 1972	Stephen F. Austin State University	Nacogdoches, Texas	Southwest	Active	
**Gamma Chi**	May 17, 1957 – xxxx ?; May 11, 2013	University of Southern Mississippi	Hattiesburg, Mississippi	Southeast	Active	
Gamma Psi	May 4, 1957 – xxxx ?;	College of William & Mary	Williamsburg, Virginia	Northeast	Inactive	
**Gamma Omega**	May 22, 1957 – 19xx ?; October 29, 1972	Texas Southern University	Houston, Texas	Southwest	Active	
Delta Alpha	May 19, 1957– 19xx ?; December 12, 1991	Langston University	Langston, Oklahoma	Southwest	Active	
Delta Beta	November 17, 1957 – xxxx ?;	Baldwin–Wallace College	Berea, Ohio	North Central	Inactive	
**Delta Gamma**	March 9, 1958	Missouri University of Science and Technology	Rolla, Missouri	Midwest	Active	
Delta Delta	March 14, 1958 – xxxx ?	Arkansas Tech University	Russellville, Arkansas	Southwest	Inactive	
Delta Epsilon	May 6, 1958 – 19xx ?; December 1, 1979	Samford University	Birmingham, Alabama	Southeast	Inactive	
Delta Zeta	March 18, 1959 – xxxx ?;	Cornell University	Ithaca, New York	Northeast	Inactive	
Delta Eta	April 12, 1959 – xxxx ?; April 14, 2001 – 20xx ?	Pittsburg State University	Pittsburg, Kansas	Midwest	Inactive	
Delta Theta	May 2, 1959 – xxxx ?	Jacksonville University	Jacksonville, Florida	Southeast	Inactive	
**Delta Iota**	May 26, 1960 – May 2012	Florida A&M University	Tallahassee, Florida	Southeast	Colony	(Note: The chapter was closed for at least five years for hazing, following a police investigation. In addition, all active members at the time of the hazing incident were expelled from the fraternity.)
Delta Kappa	May 14, 1961 – xxxx ?; May 1, 2010 – 20xx ?	South Dakota State University	Brookings, South Dakota	Midwest	Inactive	
Delta Lambda	August 25, 1961 – xxxx ?	Eastern Washington University	Cheney, Washington	Western	Inactive	
Delta Mu	January 6, 1962 – xxxx ?	Humboldt State University	Arcata, California	Western	Inactive	
Delta Nu	January 7, 1962 – xxxx ?	University of Charleston	Charleston, West Virginia	Northeast	Inactive	
**Delta Xi**	April 6, 1962	Emporia State University	Emporia, Kansas	Midwest	Active	
**Delta Omicron**	May 19, 1962	University of Connecticut	Storrs, Connecticut	Northeast	Active	
**Delta Pi**	May 5, 1962 – 19xx ?; December 6, 1992 – xxxx ?; December 8, 2007	Mississippi Valley State University	Itta Bena, Mississippi	Southeast	Probation	
Delta Rho	March 7, 1964 – xxxx ?	Arkansas State University	Jonesboro, Arkansas	Southwest	Inactive	
**Delta Sigma**	March 15, 1964	University of Texas at Arlington	Arlington, Texas	Southwest	Probation	
Delta Tau	May 16, 1964 – xxxx ?	Adams State College	Alamosa, Colorado	Midwest	Inactive	
**Delta Upsilon**	May 16, 1965	Eastern Michigan University	Ypsilanti, Michigan	North Central	Active	
Delta Phi	October 9, 1965 – xxxx ?	Xavier University	Cincinnati, Ohio	North Central	Inactive	
**Delta Chi**	February 12, 1966 – xxxx ?; June 3, 2001	Southern Arkansas University	Magnolia, Arkansas	Southwest	Active	
**Delta Psi**	April 17, 1966 – xxxx ?; January 29, 1983	Prairie View A&M University	Prairie View, Texas	Southwest	Active	
**Delta Omega**	May 22, 1966 – xxxx ?; September 25, 2011	Ferris State University	Big Rapids, Michigan	North Central	Active	
Epsilon Alpha	February 17, 1967 – xxxx ?	University of Arkansas at Little Rock	Little Rock, Arkansas	Southwest	Inactive	
**Epsilon Beta**	February 17, 1967	University of Central Arkansas	Conway, Arkansas	Southwest	Active	
**Epsilon Gamma**	April 8, 1967	Alabama State University	Montgomery, Alabama	Southeast	Active	
**Epsilon Delta**	May 13, 1967	Texas A&M University–Kingsville	Kingsville, Texas	Southwest	Active	
**Epsilon Epsilon**	May 26, 1967	Southwestern Oklahoma State University	Weatherford, Oklahoma	Southwest	Active	
**Epsilon Zeta**	May 23, 1967	Oklahoma Baptist University	Shawnee, Oklahoma	Southwest	Active	
Epsilon Eta	May 21, 1967 – xxxx ?	Western State College	Gunnison, Colorado	Midwest	Inactive	
**Epsilon Theta**	April 20, 1968	University of Louisiana at Monroe	Monroe, Louisiana	Southwest	Active	
Epsilon Iota	October 6, 1968 – xxxx ?	Mansfield University of Pennsylvania	Mansfield, Pennsylvania	Northeast	Suspended	
Epsilon Kappa	December 6, 1968 – xxxx ?	Angelo State University	San Angelo, Texas	Southwest	Inactive	
**Epsilon Lambda**	February 23, 1969	Western Carolina University	Cullowhee, North Carolina	Southeast	Active	
Epsilon Mu	May 16, 1969 – xxxx ?	Wayland Baptist University	Plainview, Texas	Southwest	Inactive	
**Epsilon Nu**	May 16, 1969	University of Massachusetts Amherst	Amherst, Massachusetts	Northeast	Active	
**Epsilon Xi**	March 13, 1970	Miami University	Oxford, Ohio	North Central	Active	
Epsilon Omicron	March 22, 1970 – xxxx ?	Wagner College	Staten Island, New York	Northeast	Inactive	
**Epsilon Pi**	April 4, 1970	Kansas State University	Manhattan, Kansas	Midwest	Active	
**Epsilon Rho**	April 7, 1970	Grambling State University	Grambling, Louisiana	Southwest	Active	
Epsilon Sigma	April 11, 1970 – xxxx ?	California State University, Sacramento	Sacramento, California	Western	Inactive	
Epsilon Tau	April 25, 1970 – xxxx ?	Oral Roberts University	Tulsa, Oklahoma	Southwest	Inactive	
**Epsilon Upsilon**	May 9, 1970	University of Maine	Orono, Maine	Northeast	Active	
**Epsilon Phi**	May 16, 1970	PennWest Clarion	Clarion, Pennsylvania	Northeast	Active	
**Epsilon Chi**	November 15, 1970	University of Arkansas at Pine Bluff	Pine Bluff, Arkansas	Southwest	Active	
**Epsilon Psi**	November 21, 1970 – 19xx ?; April 26, 1998	Missouri State University	Springfield, Missouri	Midwest	Active	
**Epsilon Omega**	February 5, 1971 – 19xx ?; April 25, 1998	University of Nebraska–Lincoln	Lincoln, Nebraska	Midwest	Active	
**Zeta Alpha**	February 14, 1971 – xxxx ?; June 8, 2003	Commonwealth University-Bloomsburg	Bloomsburg, Pennsylvania	Northeast	Active	
**Zeta Beta**	February 27, 1971	Howard Payne University	Brownwood, Texas	Southwest	Active	
**Zeta Gamma**	March 21, 1971	Texas Lutheran University	Seguin, Texas	Southwest	Active	
Zeta Delta	May 3, 1971 – xxxx ?	Southwest Baptist University	Bolivar, Missouri	Midwest	Inactive	
**Zeta Epsilon**	June 6, 1971	Michigan State University	East Lansing, Michigan	North Central	Active	
Zeta Zeta	December 4, 1971 – xxxx ?;	University of Arkansas at Monticello	Monticello, Arkansas	Southwest	Suspended	
**Zeta Eta**	December 14, 1971	South Carolina State University	Orangeburg, South Carolina	Southeast	Active	
Zeta Theta	April 16, 1972 – xx ?; February 26, 1988 – xxxx ?	West Virginia University Institute of Technology	Montgomery, West Virginia	Northeast	Inactive	
Zeta Iota	May 13, 1972 – xxxx ?;	Lane College	Jackson, Tennessee	Southeast	Inactive	
**Zeta Kappa**	November 19, 1972	East Texas A&M University	Commerce, Texas	Southwest	Active	
**Zeta Lambda**	December 3, 1972 – 19xx ?; October 23, 1994	Marshall University	Huntington, West Virginia	North Central	Active	
Zeta Mu	January 20, 1973 – xxxx ?	Kutztown University of Pennsylvania	Kutztown, Pennsylvania	Northeast	Inactive	
Zeta Nu	May 12, 1973 – 19xx ?; May 5, 2002 – 20xx ?	Southern University	Baton Rouge, Louisiana	Southwest	Inactive	
**Zeta Xi**	May 5, 1973 – 19xx ?; May 24, 2005	Tyler Junior College	Tyler, Texas	Southwest	Active	
**Zeta Omicron**	May 27, 1973	University of Akron	Akron, Ohio	North Central	Active	
**Zeta Pi**	June 10, 1973 – xxxx ?; March 20, 2022	Tennessee State University	Nashville, Tennessee	Southeast	Active	
Zeta Rho	June 17, 1973 – 19xx ?; August 24, 1996 – xxxx ?	Modesto Junior College	Modesto, California	Western	Inactive	
**Zeta Sigma**	February 9, 1974	North Carolina Central University	Durham, North Carolina	Southeast	Active	
**Zeta Tau**	May 10, 1974 – xxxx ?	Cameron University	Lawton, Oklahoma	Southwest	Suspended	
**Zeta Upsilon**	May 18, 1974	Troy University	Troy, Alabama	Southeast	Active	
**Zeta Phi**	November 2, 1974	Tuskegee University	Tuskegee, Alabama	Southeast	Active	
**Zeta Chi**	November 24, 1974	University of South Carolina	Columbia, South Carolina	Southeast	Active	
**Zeta Psi**	February 1, 1975 – 19xx ?; October 8, 2000	Virginia State University	Petersburg, Virginia	Northeast	Active	
Zeta Omega	May 29, 1975 – xxxx ?	Weber State University	Ogden, Utah	Western	Inactive	
**Eta Alpha**	October 19, 1975	Commonwealth University-Lock Haven	Lock Haven, Pennsylvania	Northeast	Active	
**Eta Beta**	April 3, 1976	Virginia Tech	Blackburg, Virginia	Northeast	Active	
**Eta Gamma**	April 24, 1976	Morgan State University	Baltimore, Maryland	Northeast	Active	
**Eta Delta**	December 13, 1976	Eastern Illinois University	Charleston, Illinois	North Central	Active	
Eta Epsilon	April 16, 1977 – xxxx ?	Illinois State University	Normal, Illinois	North Central	Inactive	
**Eta Zeta**	May 7, 1977	University of Kansas	Lawrence, Kansas	Midwest	Active	
**Eta Eta**	October 28, 1977	Jackson State University	Jackson, Mississippi	Southeast	Active	
Eta Theta	April 9, 1978 – xxxx ?	Nicholls State University	Thibodaux, Louisiana	Southwest	Inactive	
Eta Iota	February 18, 1978 – xxxx ?	Bethune-Cookman University	Daytona Beach, Florida	Southeast	Inactive	
**Eta Kappa**	May 20, 1978 – xxxx ?; March 2, 1997	Albany State University	Albany, Georgia	Southeast	Probation	
Eta Lambda	October 7, 1978 – xxxx ?	Carson–Newman College	Jefferson City, Tennessee	Southeast	Inactive	
Eta Mu	December 16, 1978 – xxxx ?	San Diego State University	San Diego, California	Western	Inactive	
**Eta Nu**	February 17, 1979 – xxxx ?; December 7, 2000	Southeastern Oklahoma State University	Durant, Oklahoma	Southwest	Active	
**Eta Xi**	March 15, 1980	Louisiana Tech University	Ruston, Louisiana	Southwest	Active	
**Eta Omicron**	November 9, 1980	James Madison University	Harrisonburg, Virginia	Northeast	Active	
**Eta Pi**	October 3, 1981	University of Northern Iowa	Cedar Falls, Iowa	Midwest	Active	
**Eta Rho**	November 22, 1981	West Chester University	West Chester, Pennsylvania	Northeast	Active	
**Eta Sigma**	April 23, 1982	University of Central Florida	Orlando, Florida	Southeast	Active	
Eta Tau	April 25, 1982 – xxxx ?	Allegheny College	Meadville, Pennsylvania	Northeast	Inactive	
**Eta Upsilon**	May 1, 1982	University of Missouri	Columbia, Missouri	Midwest	Active	
**Eta Phi**	December 4, 1982	Syracuse University	Syracuse, New York	Northeast	Active	
**Eta Chi**	May 1, 1983 – 19xx ?; June 19, 1997 – xxxx ?; May 30, 2009	Bowie State University	Bowie, Maryland	Northeast	Active	
Eta Psi	May 8, 1983 – 19xx ?; June 13, 2003 – 20xx ?	Delaware State University	Dover, Delaware	Northeast	Inactive	
**Eta Omega**	February 4, 1984	Howard University	Washington, D.C.	Northeast	Probation	
**Theta Alpha**	February 19, 1984	Texas State University	San Marcos, Texas	Southwest	Active	
**Theta Beta**	March 29, 1984	Boston University	Boston, Massachusetts	Northeast	Active	
**Theta Gamma**	May 11, 1984	California University of Pennsylvania	California, Pennsylvania	Northeast	Active	
Theta Delta	June 1, 1984 – 19xx ?; February 12, 2005 – 20xx ?	Central State University	Wilberforce, Ohio	North Central	Inactive	
**Theta Epsilon**	October 6, 1984	University of Kentucky	Lexington, Kentucky	North Central	Active	
**Theta Zeta**	February 2, 1985	Ashland University	Ashland, Ohio	North Central	Active	
Theta Eta	June 20, 1985 – 19xx ?; April 22, 2001 – 20xx ?;	University of Louisville	Louisville, Kentucky	North Central	Inactive	
**Theta Theta**	February 21, 1986 – 19xx ?; May 15, 1999	University of Alabama at Birmingham	Birmingham, Alabama	Southeast	Active	
Theta Iota	March 2, 1986 – xxxx ?	Baker University	Baldwin City, Kansas	Midwest	Inactive	
Theta Kappa	March 13, 1986 – xxxx ?	Tarleton State University	Stephenville, Texas	Southwest	Suspended	
**Theta Lambda**	October 19, 1986 – 19xx ?; October 25, 2009	University of Memphis	Memphis, Tennessee	Southeast	Active	
Theta Mu	October 19, 1986 – xxxx ?	Johnson C. Smith University	Charlotte, North Carolina	Southeast	Inactive	
**Theta Nu**	November 21, 1986	Northwestern State University	Natchitoches, Louisiana	Southwest	Active	
Theta Xi	April 10, 1987 – xxxx ?	Southern Connecticut State University	New Haven, Connecticut	Northeast	Inactive	
Theta Omicron	May 3, 1987 – xxxx ?	Georgia Southwestern State University	Americus, Georgia	Southeast	Inactive	
Theta Pi	May 22, 1987 – xxxx ?	Brigham Young University	Provo, Utah	Western	Inactive	
**Theta Rho**	December 3, 1987 – 19xx ? April 28, 2000	Lincoln University of Missouri	Jefferson City, Missouri	Midwest	Active	
**Theta Sigma**	December 4, 1987	Fairmont State University	Fairmont, West Virginia	Northeast	Active	
**Theta Tau**	February 6, 1988	Fayetteville State University	Fayetteville, North Carolina	Southeast	Active	
**Theta Upsilon**	February 21, 1988	University of Rhode Island	Kingston, Rhode Island	Northeast	Active	
**Theta Phi**	March 8, 1988	Henderson State University	Arkadelphia, Arkansas	Southwest	Active	
**Theta Chi**	April 22, 1988 – xxxx ?; May 7, 2021	Livingstone College	Salisbury, North Carolina	Southeast	Active	
**Theta Psi**	April 25, 1988	Virginia Union University	Richmond, Virginia	Northeast	Active	
Theta Omega	April 29, 1988 – xxxx ?	University of North Alabama	Florence, Alabama	Southeast	Inactive	
**Iota Alpha**	April 30, 1988	California State University, Fresno	Fresno, California	Western	Active	
**Iota Beta**	February 4, 1989	Alcorn State University	Lorman, Mississippi	Southeast	Active	
**Iota Gamma**	April 1, 1989	Washington State University	Pullman, Washington	Western	Active	
**Iota Delta**	April 8, 1989	Towson University	Towson, Maryland	Northeast	Active	
Iota Epsilon	February 25, 1990 – xxxx ?	University of the Cumberlands	Williamsburg, Kentucky	North Central	Inactive	
**Iota Zeta**	February 24, 1990	North Carolina A&T State University	Greensboro, North Carolina	Southeast	Active	
Iota Eta	March 30, 1990 – xxxx ?	Waynesburg University	Waynesburg, Pennsylvania	Northeast	Inactive	
Iota Theta	April 7, 1990 – 19xx ?; November 18, 2001	Morehouse College	Atlanta, Georgia	Southeast	Inactive	
**Iota Iota**	April 13, 1990	Utah State University	Logan, Utah	Western	Active	
**Iota Kappa**	April 14, 1990	Boise State University	Boise, Idaho	Western	Active	
**Iota Lambda**	May 2, 1990	University of Mount Union	Alliance, Ohio	North Central	Active	
**Iota Mu**	May 6, 1990 – 199x ?; March 20, 1999	Kentucky State University	Frankfort, Kentucky	North Central	Probation	
Iota Nu	October 21, 1990 – xxxx ?; January 24, 2017 – November 2019	Alabama A&M University	Normal, Alabama	Southeast	Inactive	(Note: The chapter's charter was revoked and all active members were expelled for hazing.)
**Iota Xi**	March 14, 1991	Norfolk State University	Norfolk, Virginia	Northeast	Active	
**Iota Omicron**	September 29, 1991	Appalachian State University	Boone, North Carolina	Southeast	Active	
**Iota Pi**	April 5, 1992	California Polytechnic State University, San Luis Obispo	San Luis Obispo, California	Western	Active	
Iota Rho	May 9, 1992 – xxxx ?	Morris Brown College	Atlanta, Georgia	Southeast	Inactive	
**Iota Sigma**	June 11, 1992	Blinn College	Brenham, Texas	Southwest	Active	
**Iota Tau**	February 7, 1993	Clark Atlanta University	Atlanta, Georgia	Southeast	Active	
**Iota Upsilon**	March 20, 1993	McNeese State University	Lake Charles, Louisiana	Southwest	Active	
**Iota Phi**	May 8, 1993	University of New Hampshire	Durham, New Hampshire	Northeast	Active	
Iota Chi	November 14, 1993 – xxxx ?	Youngstown State University	Youngstown, Ohio	North Central	Inactive	
**Iota Psi**	December 5, 1993	University of Nebraska at Kearney	Kearney, Nebraska	Midwest	Active	
**Iota Omega**	March 19, 1994	Iowa State University	Ames, Iowa	Midwest	Active	
**Kappa Alpha**	October 16, 1994	University of Minnesota	Minneapolis, Minnesota	Midwest	Active	
**Kappa Beta**	October 30, 1994	Clemson University	Clemson, South Carolina	Southeast	Active	
**Kappa Gamma**	January 28, 1995	Lehigh University	Bethlehem, Pennsylvania	Northeast	Active	
**Kappa Delta**	February 26, 1995	Northwest Missouri State University	Maryville, Missouri	Midwest	Active	
**Kappa Epsilon**	November 26, 1995	Shenandoah University	Winchester, Virginia	Northeast	Active	
**Kappa Zeta**	March 3, 1995 – xxxx ?; May 2, 2010	Wake Forest University	Winston-Salem, North Carolina	Southeast	Probation	
**Kappa Eta**	February 25, 1996	University at Buffalo	Buffalo, New York	Northeast	Active	
Kappa Theta	May 4, 1997 – xxxx ?	Liberty University	Lynchburg, Virginia	Northeast	Inactive	
**Kappa Iota**	December 6, 1997	University of Nebraska at Omaha	Omaha, Nebraska	Midwest	Active	
**Kappa Kappa**	April 18, 1998	Miles College	Birmingham, Alabama	Southeast	Active	
**Kappa Lambda**	March 14, 1999	Winston-Salem State University	Winston-Salem, North Carolina	Southeast	Active	
**Kappa Mu**	April 22, 1999	University of Georgia	Athens, Georgia	Southeast	Active	
**Kappa Nu**	April 25, 1999	Northern Illinois University	DeKalb, Illinois	North Central	Active	
Kappa Xi	June 1, 2000 – 20xx ?	Northeastern Oklahoma A&M College	Miami, Oklahoma	Southwest	Inactive	
**Kappa Omicron**	October 29, 2000	Stillman College	Tuscaloosa, Alabama	Southeast	Active	
**Kappa Pi**	February 24, 2001 – 20xx ?; April 28, 2024	Claflin University	Orangeburg, South Carolina	Southeast	Active	
Kappa Rho	March 11, 2001 – 20xx ?	Duquesne University	Pittsburgh, Pennsylvania	Northeast	Active	
**Kappa Sigma**	March 25, 2001	East Carolina University	Greenville, North Carolina	Southeast	Active	
**Kappa Tau**	April 13, 2001	University of South Florida	Tampa, Florida	Southeast	Active	
**Kappa Upsilon**	May 6, 2001	Marist College	Poughkeepsie, New York	Northeast	Active	
**Kappa Phi**	April 19, 2002	East Texas Baptist University	Marshall, Texas	Southwest	Active	
**Kappa Chi**	April 20, 2002	Albion College	Albion, Michigan	North Central	Active	
**Kappa Psi**	April 28, 2002	Virginia Commonwealth University	Richmond, Virginia	Northeast	Active	
Kappa Omega	May 18, 2002 – 20xx ?	Northern Kentucky University	Highland Heights, Kentucky	North Central	Inactive	
Lambda Alpha	June 1, 2002 – 20xx ?	University of California, Irvine	Irvine, California	Western	Inactive	
Lambda Beta	April 27, 2003 – 20xx ?	Charleston Southern University	Charleston, South Carolina	Southeast	Inactive	
**Lambda Gamma**	May 31, 2003	Florida International University	Miami, Florida	Southeast	Active	
**Lambda Delta**	July 11, 2003	Shippensburg University of Pennsylvania	Shippensburg, Pennsylvania	Northeast	Active	
Lambda Epsilon	October 26, 2003 – 20xx ?	Ouachita Baptist University	Arkadelphia, Arkansas	Southwest	Inactive	
Lambda Zeta	December 7, 2003 – 20xx ?	Fort Valley State University	Fort Valley, Georgia	Southeast	Inactive	
**Lambda Eta**	June 14, 2004	University of West Georgia	Carrollton, Georgia	Southeast	Active	
Lambda Theta	November 7, 2004 – 20xx ?	Coastal Carolina University	Conway, South Carolina	Southeast	Inactive	
**Lambda Iota**	December 5, 2005	Tiffin University	Tiffin, Ohio	North Central	Active	
**Lambda Kappa**	February 21, 2005	University of Arkansas–Fort Smith	Fort Smith, Arkansas	Southwest	Active	
**Lambda Lambda**	February 27, 2005	Indiana State University	Terre Haute, Indiana	North Central	Active	
**Lambda Mu**	May 7, 2005 – 20xx ?; February 6, 2016	East Tennessee State University	Johnson City, Tennessee	Southeast	Active	
**Lambda Nu**	May 21, 2005	Sacred Heart University	Fairfield, Connecticut	Northeast	Active	
**Lambda Xi**	January 15, 2006	Southeastern Louisiana University	Hammond, Louisiana	Southwest	Active	
**Lambda Omicron**	March 25, 2006 – 20xx ?; December 12, 2021	Valdosta State University	Valdosta, Georgia	Southeast	Active	
**Lambda Pi**	April 15, 2006 – 2018 April 24, 2025	University of Texas at Tyler	Tyler, Texas	Southwest	Active	
**Lambda Rho**	May 6, 2006	Tennessee Technological University	Cookeville, Tennessee	Southeast	Active	
Lambda Sigma	May 13, 2006 – 20xx ?	Coahoma Community College	Clarksdale, Mississippi	Southeast	Inactive	
**Lambda Tau**	November 5, 2006	Central Michigan University	Mount Pleasant, Michigan	North Central	Active	
**Lambda Upsilon**	November 5, 2006; March 20, 2022	Savannah State University	Savannah, Georgia	Southeast	Active	
**Lambda Phi**	December 2, 2006	Kean University	Union, New Jersey	Northeast	Probation	
Lambda Chi	December 9, 2006 – 20xx ?	Quincy University	Quincy, Illinois	North Central	Suspended	
**Lambda Psi**	March 23, 2007	San Jose State University	San Jose, California	Western	Active	
Lambda Omega	April 28, 2007 – 20xx ?	Northwestern Oklahoma State University	Alva, Oklahoma	Southwest	Inactive	
**Mu Alpha**	May 6, 2007	McKendree University	Lebanon, Illinois	North Central	Active	
**Mu Beta**	June 9, 2007	Florida Atlantic University	Boca Raton, Florida	Southeast	Active	
Mu Gamma	January 8, 2008 – 20xx ?	Houston Baptist University	Houston, Texas	Southwest	Inactive	
**Mu Delta**	February 29, 2008	Western Michigan University	Kalamazoo, Michigan	North Central	Active	
**Mu Epsilon**	May 2, 2008	East Stroudsburg University of Pennsylvania	East Stroudsburg, Pennsylvania	Northeast	Active	
Mu Zeta	May 11, 2008 – 20xx ?	Diablo Valley College	Pleasant Hill, California	Western	Inactive	
**Mu Eta**	September 6, 2008	University of North Carolina at Chapel Hill	Chapel Hill, North Carolina	Southeast	Active	
Mu Theta	November 22, 2008 – 20xx ?	Bethel University	McKenzie, Tennessee	Southeast	Inactive	
Mu Iota	March 1, 2009 – 20xx ?	Jacksonville State University	Jacksonville, Alabama	Southeast	Inactive	
**Mu Kappa**	April 18, 2009	Grand Valley State University	Allendale, Michigan	North Central	Active	
**Mu Lambda**	April 24, 2009	University of Mary Hardin–Baylor	Belton, Texas	Southwest	Active	
Mu Mu	April 26, 2009 – 20xx ?	University of Central Oklahoma	Edmond, Oklahoma	Southwest	Inactive	
**Mu Nu**	May 2, 2009	Christopher Newport University	Newport News, Virginia	Northeast	Active	
**Mu Xi**	May 8, 2009	Muhlenberg College	Allentown, Pennsylvania	Northeast	Active	
**Mu Omicron**	December 5, 2009	George Mason University	Fairfax, Virginia	Northeast	Active	
**Mu Pi**	February 14, 2010	University of Oregon	Eugene, Oregon	Western	Active	
**Mu Rho**	March 21, 2010	Benedict College	Columbia, South Carolina	Southeast	Active	
**Mu Sigma**	April 3, 2010	Lincoln University	Chester County, Pennsylvania	Northeast	Active	
**Mu Tau**	April 24, 2010	University of Texas at San Antonio	San Antonio, Texas	Southwest	Probation	
**Mu Upsilon**	April 30, 2010	Florida Gulf Coast University	Fort Myers, Florida	Southeast	Active	
**Mu Phi**	October 3, 2010	Fullerton College	Fullerton, California	Western	Active	
**Mu Chi**	November 20, 2010	University of Texas–Pan American	Edinburg, Texas	Southwest	Active	
Mu Psi	February 19, 2011 – 20xx ?	Texas College	Tyler, Texas	Southwest	Inactive	
**Mu Omega**	February 27, 2011	Huntingdon College	Montgomery, Alabama	Southeast	Active	
**Nu Alpha**	November 28, 2011	Georgia State University	Atlanta, Georgia	Southeast	Active	
**Nu Beta**	March 4, 2012	Texas Wesleyan University	Fort Worth, Texas	Southwest	Active	
**Nu Gamma**	August 14, 2012	Robert Morris University	Pittsburgh, Pennsylvania	Northeast	Active	
Nu Delta	May 4, 2013 – 20xx ?	McMurry University	Abilene, Texas	Southwest	Inactive	
**Nu Epsilon**	May 11, 2013	Idaho State University	Pocatello, Idaho	Western	Active	
**Nu Zeta**	December 11, 2013	PennWest Edinboro	Edinboro, Pennsylvania	Northeast	Active	
**Nu Eta**	March 2, 2014	Saint Augustine's University	Raleigh, North Carolina	Southeast	Active	
**Nu Theta**	April 13, 2014	Northeastern University	Boston, Massachusetts	Northeast	Active	
**Nu Iota**	May 31, 2014	Elizabeth City State University	Elizabeth City, North Carolina	Southeast	Active	
**Nu Kappa**	October 19, 2014	Georgia Southern University	Statesboro, Georgia	Southeast	Active	
Nu Lambda	October 19, 2014 – 20xx ?	Arkansas State University-Beebe	Beebe, Arkansas	Southwest	Inactive	
**Nu Mu**	April 16, 2015	Kennesaw State University	Kennesaw, Georgia	Southeast	Active	
**Nu Nu**	April 21, 2015	University of Alabama	Tuscaloosa, Alabama	Southeast	Active	
**Nu Xi**	March 15, 2016	University of Illinois Urbana-Champaign	Urbana, Illinois	North Central	Active	
**Nu Omicron**	April 24, 2016	University of New Haven	West Haven, Connecticut	Northeast	Active	
**Nu Pi**	May 2, 2016	University of Illinois at Chicago	Chicago, Illinois	North Central	Active	
**Nu Rho**	April 21, 2017	Old Dominion University	Norfolk, Virginia	Northeast	Active	
**Nu Sigma**	November 18, 2017	California State Polytechnic University, Pomona	Pomona, California	Western	Active	
**Nu Tau**	April 21, 2018	High Point University	High Point, North Carolina	Southeast	Active	
**Nu Upsilon**	December 1, 2018	Ball State University	Muncie, Indiana	North Central	Active	
**Nu Phi**	May 5, 2019	Schreiner University	Kerrville, Texas	Southwest	Active	
**Nu Chi**	May 9, 2019	Wilkes University	Wilkes-Barre, Pennsylvania	Northeast	Active	
Nu Psi	May 8, 2020 – 202x ?	Chicago State University	Chicago, Illinois	North Central	Suspended	
**Nu Omega**	April 14, 2021	Hampton University	Hampton, Virginia	Northeast	Active	
**Xi Alpha**	April 25, 2021	Shepherd University	Shepherdstown, West Virginia	Northeast	Active	
**Xi Beta**	April 28, 2021	University of North Texas	Denton, Texas	Southwest	Active	
Xi Gamma	January 30, 2022 – 202x ?	Cleveland State University	Cleveland, Ohio	North Central	Suspended	
**Xi Delta**	December 3, 2022	Stony Brook University	Stony Brook, New York	Northeast	Active	
**Xi Epsilon**	April 13, 2023	Florida Memorial University	Miami Gardens, Florida	Southeast	Active	
**Xi Zeta**	April 17, 2023	Widener University	Chester, Pennsylvania	Northeast	Active	
**Xi Eta**	April 27, 2024	Austin Peay State University	Clarksville, Tennessee	Southeast	Active	
**Xi Theta**	November 11, 2024	Edward Waters University	Jacksonville, Florida	Southeast	Active	
**Xi Lambda**	October 19, 2025	Wilberforce University	Wilberforce, Ohio	North Central	Active	

== Districts ==
District map of Kappa Kappa Psi: North Central District Northeast District Midwest District Southeast District Southwest District Western District

Chapters and colonies of Kappa Kappa Psi are organized into seven districts, six of which are named for the geographical region of the United States that they represent. These are the North Central, Northeast, Midwest, Southeast, Southwest, and Western districts.

- North Central District: Indiana, Illinois, Kentucky, Michigan, Ohio, and Wisconsin
- Northeast District: Connecticut, Delaware, District of Columbia, Maine, Maryland, Massachusetts, New Hampshire, New Jersey, New York, Pennsylvania, Rhode Island, Vermont, Virginia, and West Virginia
- Midwest District: Colorado, Iowa, Kansas, Minnesota, Missouri, Montana, Nebraska, North Dakota, South Dakota, and Wyoming
- Southeast District: Alabama, Florida, Georgia, Mississippi, North Carolina, South Carolina, and Tennessee
- Southwest District: Arkansas, Louisiana, New Mexico, Oklahoma, and Texas
- Western District: Alaska, Arizona, California, Hawaii, Idaho, Nevada, Oregon, Utah, and Washington

The seventh district is a de jure International District, which would contain any chapter located outside of the United States, but there are no international chapters and therefore no practical International District.

Each chapter is automatically a member of the district its state is located, unless it appeals to the National Council to join a neighboring district. Only one chapter in the fraternity is not in its state's district: Zeta Lambda at Marshall University is in the North Central District, though it is located in West Virginia, which is in the Northeast District.
