= Diebesturm =

Diebesturm (German for "Thieves' Tower) may refer to:

- Diebesturm (Witzenhausen), a round tower in Witzenhausen, Germany
- Diebesturm (Bad Sooden-Allendorf), a round tower in Bad Sooden-Allendorf, Germany
