= Wanfried agreement =

1945 treaty between the United States and Soviet Union

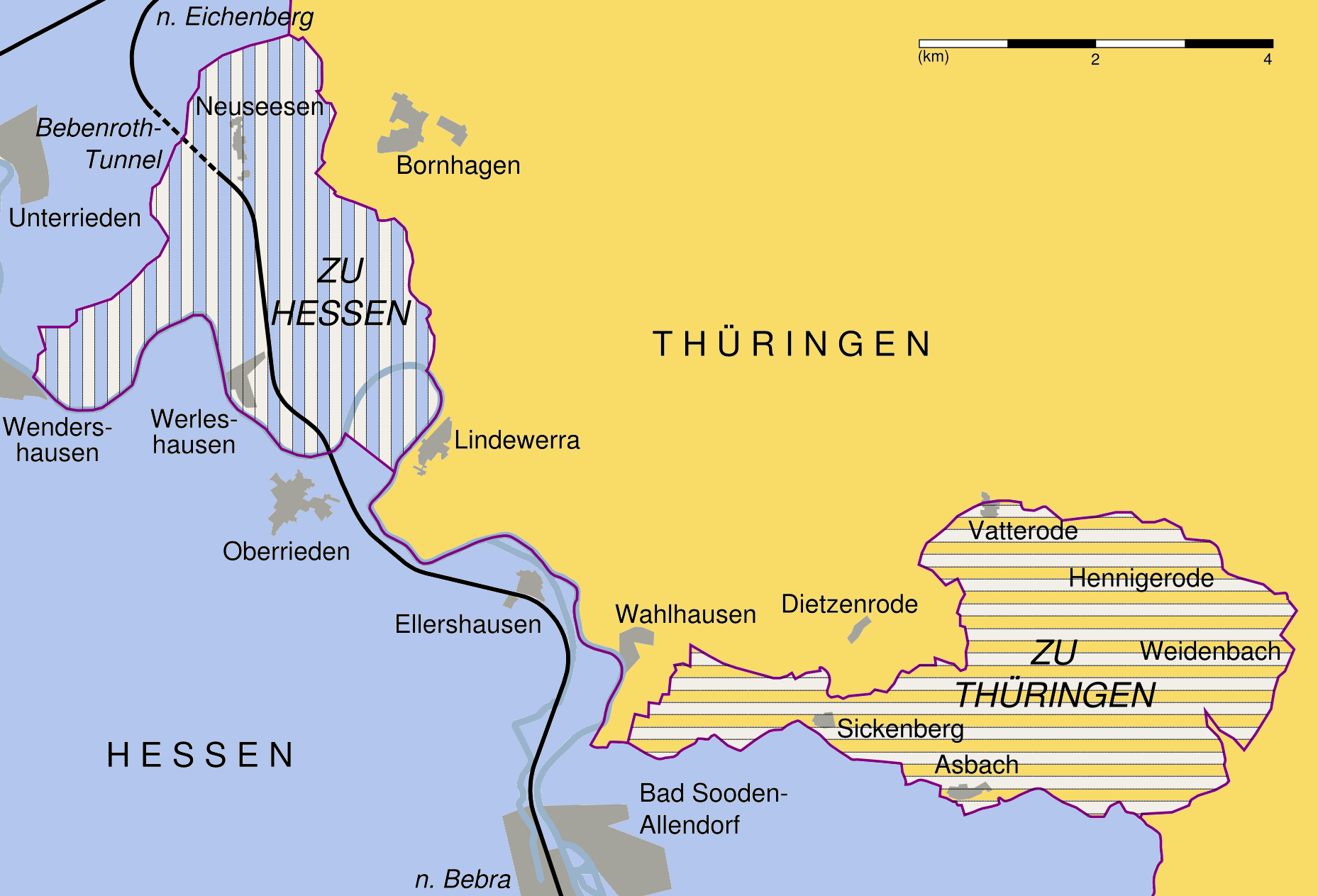

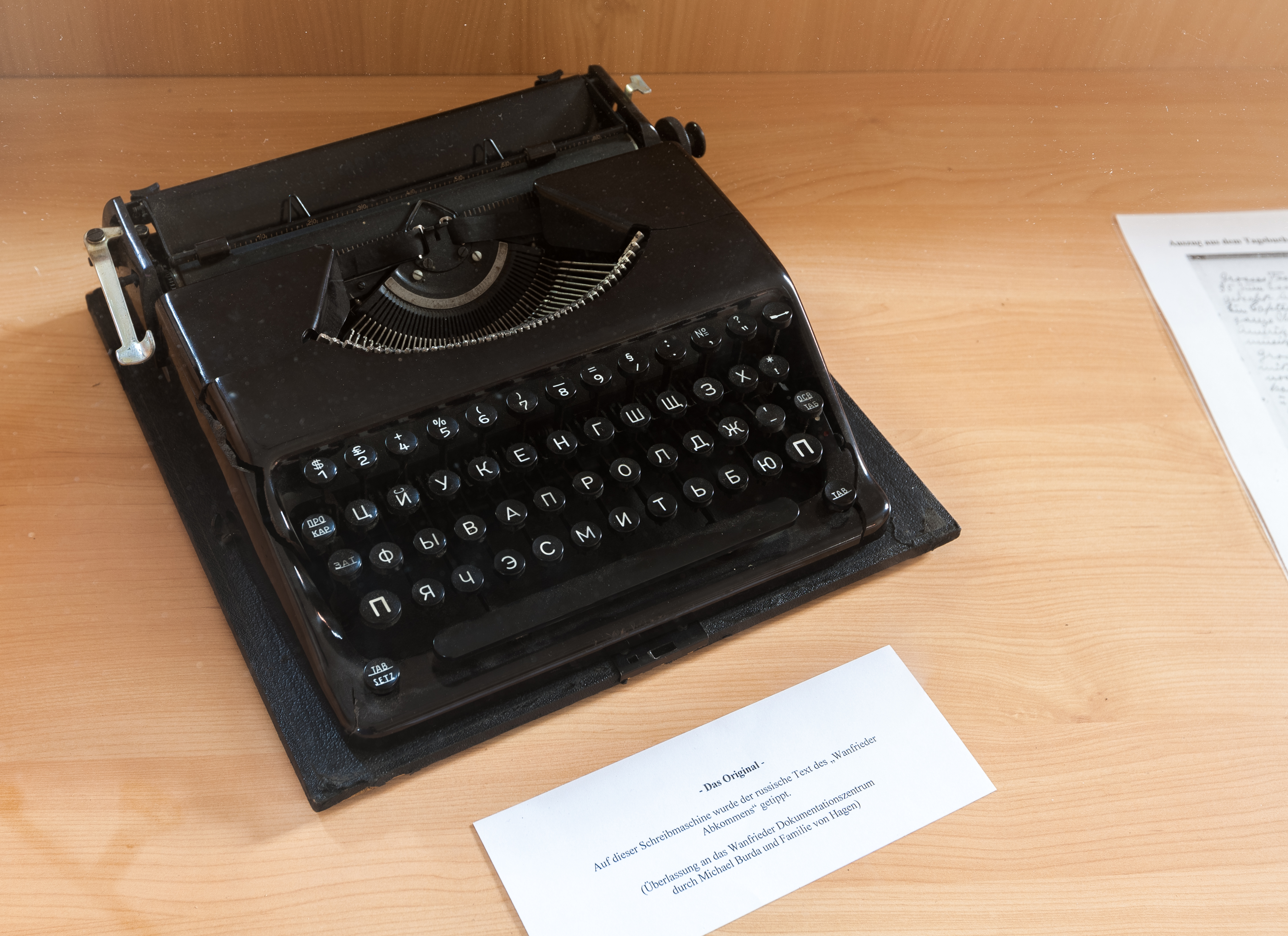
Typewriter with Cyrillic keyboard layout that was used to type the Russian version of the Wanfried agreement.

The Wanfried Agreement (German: Wanfrieder Abkommen) concerned a transfer of territory between the U.S. and Soviet occupation zones after World War II in Hesse, Germany, which took place after the determination of the main inner German border at the end of July 1945.

In the U.S. zone the Bebra–Göttingen railway line, which linked with lines to the cities of Bremen, Hannover and Bebra cut across a small (~ 3 km / 2 mi) portion of the Soviet zone near Neuseesen and Werleshausen (Thuringia). This situation caused disruptions of traffic on the line, which was important to the U.S. as a link between its occupation zone in southern Germany and a small U.S.-controlled exclave at the port of Bremerhaven on the North Sea.

On September 17, 1945, an agreement was signed in the town of Wanfried between the American and Soviet authorities moving the border to resolve the problem. After the agreement was concluded, the participating officers exchanged flasks of whisky and vodka, and from then on the railway line was known jokingly in German as the Whisky-Wodka-Linie.

Brigadier General William T. Sexton, U.S. Army, signed the Wanfried agreement for the United States, while Red Army Major General Vasily S. Askalepov signed for the Soviet Union.

The Hessian villages of Asbach-Sickenberg, Vatterode, and Weidenbach/Hennigerode (Kreis Witzenhausen) with 429 inhabitants and 7.61 square kilometres of land fell in Soviet territory. The Eichsfeld villages of Neuseesen and Werleshausen with 560 people and 8.45 square kilometres were transferred to the U.S. zone.

Although other such small exchanges took place afterwards on the inner-German border, only the Wanfried Agreement had the status of a treaty between the occupying Powers, and is considered to have been on an equal footing with the Potsdam Agreement.
