= 3rd Infantry Division Artillery =

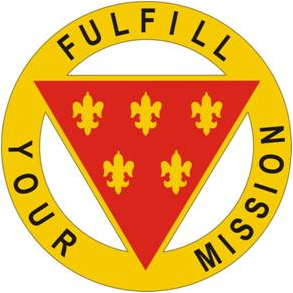
- Distinctive unit insignia
- Country: United States of America
- Branch: United States Army
- Type: Field artillery
- Role: Division force fires HQ
- Size: Brigade
- Part of: 3rd Infantry Division
- Garrison/HQ: Fort Stewart, Georgia
- Nickname: Marne Thunder

Commanders
- Current commander: COL Matthew R. VanGilder
- Command Sergeant Major: CSM Matthew A. Howard
- Notable commanders: William T. Sexton

The 3rd Infantry Division Artillery (DIVARTY) is the divisional artillery command for the 3rd Infantry Division at Fort Stewart, Georgia. The DIVARTY has served with the division in World Wars I and II, the Korean War, Operation Iraqi Freedom, and in peacetime at Fort Stewart and Germany. The DIVARTY was inactivated in 2004 as part of transformation to modular brigade combat teams, but was reactivated on 17 October 2014 to provide fire support coordination and mission command for the training and readiness of Field Artillery units across the division.

== History ==
=== World War I ===
The 3rd Field Artillery Brigade was constituted in the Regular Army as part of the 3rd Division (later 3rd Infantry Division) on 12 November 1917, and organized at Camp Stanley, Texas, on 26 November 1917. Besides the headquarters, the brigade’s initial units were the 10th Field Artillery Regiment, stationed at Fort Douglas, Utah, with 24 75 mm guns; the 76th Field Artillery Regiment, at Fort Bliss, Texas, with 24 75 mm guns; the 18th Field Artillery Regiment, with 24 155 mm howitzers at Fort Ethan Allen Vermont; and the 3rd Trench Mortar Battery, with 12 6-inch trench mortars. The 3rd Division was never concentrated at a single location before departure to France. After sailing to France in March and April 1918, the units of 3rd Field Artillery Brigade began training at Camp Coetquidan, France

=== World War II ===
==== Pentomic ====
On 1 July 1957, the DIVARTY reorganized under the pentomic organization. The pentomic DIVARTY organized with a direct support 105mm battalion (1st Howitzer Battalion, 10th Artillery), with five firing batteries to support the divisions five battle groups and a composite general support battalion (1st FA Battalion, 9th Artillery), with two 155 mm howitzer batteries of six guns, a four gun battery of 8-inch howitzers, and an Honest John rocket battery with two launchers.

In April 1958, the 3rd Infantry Division rotated to Germany under Operation Gyroscope, replacing the DIVARTY of the 10th Infantry Division at Kitzingen, West Germany.

On 1 April 1960, the DIVARTY was reorganized with a five composite 105mm/155mm direct support battalions (one for each battle group; three towed and two self-propelled) with the composite general support battalion consisting of 8-inch howitzers and Honest John rockets. The DIVARTY's new direct support battalions were 1st Howitzer Battalion (Self-Propelled), 10th Artillery; 6th Howitzer Battalion, 18th Artillery; 2nd Howitzer Battalion (Self-Propelled), 39th Artillery; 2nd Howitzer Battalion, 41st Artillery; 3rd Howitzer Battalion, 76th Artillery.

==== ROAD ====
In August 1963, the DIVARTY reorganized under the Reorganization Objective Army Division (ROAD) organization. The DIVARTY now fielded three DS battalions (one for each of the division's three brigades) equipped with self-propelled 105 mm howitzers (1st Bn, 10th Arty; 2nd Bn, 39th Arty; 2nd Bn, 41st Arty), a composite 155mm and 8-inch general support howitzer battalion (3rd Bn, 76th Arty), and an Honest John rocket battalion (1st Bn, 9th Arty). By 1965, the M108 self-propelled 105 mm howitzers in the DS battalions had been replaced with 155mm M109 howitzers.

In 1972, the 3rd Bn, 76th FA reflagged as the 1st Bn, 76th FA.

In the 1970s, as a result of increasing weapons capability and unit zones, the DIVARTY activated a target acquisition battery. In 1984, this battery was designated Battery A, 25th Field Artillery.

In 1987, as part of the conversion to the "Army of Excellence" organization, 1-76 FA was reorganized and redesignated as Battery A, 76th FA. The division lost its 8-in howitzers, and retained a single firing battery of [M270 Multiple Launch Rocket System|MLRS].

In 1988, the DIVARTY reflagged 1st Bn, 10th FA and 2nd Bn, 39th FA as 5th and 6th Bns, 41st FA, grouping three battalions from the 41st FA in the DIVARTY. The separate target acquisition and MLRS batteries retained different regimental lineages.

=== Post Cold War. In 1990 2-41 deployed to Desert Shield from Bad Kissengen Germany ===
In 1991, the DIVARTY deployed 2-41 FA and 6-41 FA to Saudi Arabia to participate in Operation Desert Storm. As a result of force reductions following the fall of the Berlin Wall, the DIVARTY inactivated two battalions (2-41 FA and 6-41 FA in 1991). In return, 6-1 FA (from 1st Armored Division) and 3-35 FA (from 72nd FA Brigade) were attached to the division. When 3-1 FA returned from Operation Desert Storm, it was also attached to the division. In 1992, 2-14 FA (MLRS) was attached to the division from V Corps Artillery. A/76 FA, the division's MLRS battery, was inactivated and its personnel and equipment used to form one of the batteries in 2-14 FA. 3-35 FA was also inactivated as part of continuing force reductions. A/25 FA was reassigned to V Corps Artillery, with B/25 FA reassigned from 1st Armored Division as its replacement In 1994, 6-1 FA inactivated as part of continuing US force reductions in Germany. In 1995, 2-14 FA was inactivated, and A/76 FA activated as a separate MLRS battery for the division.

On 15–16 February 1996, the DIVARTY was involved in a complicated reflagging action involving three divisions. As part of finalizing the designations of the reduced 10 division force, the Germany-based units of 3rd Infantry Division were reflagged to 1st Infantry Division (1st ID): HHB, 3rd Infantry Division Artillery as HHB, 1st Infantry Division Artillery; 3-1 FA was inactivated, with its personnel and equipment used to activate 1st Bn, 6th FA (1st ID); and 5-41 FA was inactivated, with its personnel and equipment used to activate 1st Bn, 7th FA (1st ID). Btry A, 76th FA and Btry B, 25th FA were simultaneously reassigned to the 1st ID. At the same time, the Georgia-based units of the 24th ID were reflagged to 3rd ID units: HHB, 24th Infantry Division Artillery as HHB, 3rd Infantry Division Artillery; 1st Bn, 41st FA reassigned to the 3rd ID at Fort Steward, GA; 3rd Bn, 41st FA reflagged as 1st Bn, 9th FA, at Fort Stewart; and 4th Bn, 41st FA, reflagged as 1st Bn, 10th FA, at Fort Benning, GA. Battery G (TAB), 333rd FA at Fort Stewart was reflagged as Btry A (TAB), 39th FA. In addition, the three battalions and TAB battery, Btry A, 13th FA was reassigned to the 3rd ID.

== Lineage and honors ==
=== Lineage ===
- Constituted 12 November 1917 in the Regular Army as Headquarters, 3d Field Artillery Brigade, and assigned to the 3d Division
- Organized 26 November 1917 at Camp Stanley, Texas
- Disbanded 16 October 1939 at Fort Lewis, Washington
- Reconstituted 1 October 1940 in the Regular Army as Headquarters and Headquarters Battery, 3d Division Artillery, and activated at Fort Lewis, Washington
- Redesignated 1 July 1957 as Headquarters and Headquarters Battery, 3d Infantry Division Artillery

=== Campaign participation credit ===
- World War I: Champagne-Marne; Aisne-Marne; St. Mihiel; Meuse-Argonne; Champagne 1918
- World War II: Tunisia; Sicily (with arrowhead); Naples-Foggia; Anzio (with arrowhead); Rome-Arno; Southern France (with arrowhead); Rhineland; Ardennes-Alsace; Central Europe
- Korean War: CCF Intervention; First UN Counteroffensive; CCF Spring Offensive; UN Summer-Fall Offensive; Second Korean Winter; Korea, Summer-Fall 1952; Third Korean Winter; Korea, Summer 1953

=== Decorations ===
- Presidential Unit Citation (Army) for COLMAR
- French Croix de Guerre with Palm for COLMAR
- French Croix de Guerre, World War II, Fourragere
- Republic of Korea Presidential Unit Citation for UIJONGBU CORRIDOR
- Republic of Korea Presidential Unit Citation for IRON TRIANGLE
- Chryssoun Aristion Andrias (Gold Cross of Valour of Greece) for KOREA

== Heraldry ==
=== Distinctive unit insignia ===
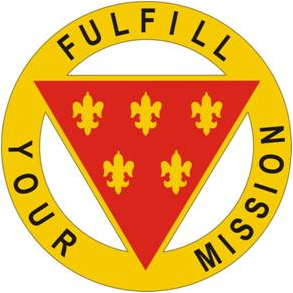

==== Description/Blazon ====
A red triangle with one point down charged with five gold fleurs-de-lis, three and two, superimposed upon a gold circular bend bearing the motto "FULFILL YOUR MISSION" in black. The insignia is 1 inch (2.54 cm) in diameter.

==== Symbolism ====
The three points of the triangle are indicative of the numerical designation of the unit and also, of the 3rd Division to which the organization is assigned. The five fleurs-de-lis symbolize the major engagements in which the unit participated in World War I.

==== Background ====
The distinctive unit insignia was originally approved for Headquarters and Headquarters Battery, 3rd Field Artillery Brigade on 4 February 1930. It was redesignated for Headquarters and Headquarters Battery, 3rd Infantry Division Artillery on 29 April 1952.
