= 77th Guards Rifle Division =

WW2 Soviet Red Army formation

173rd Rifle Division 77th Guards Rifle Division
- Active: 1943–1957
- Country: Soviet Union
- Allegiance: Red Army
- Branch: Red Army (1943-1946); Soviet Army (1946-1957)
- Type: Infantry
- Size: Division
- Garrison/HQ: Arkhangelsk (Lesnaya Rechka), Arkhangelsk Oblast
- Engagements: World War II: Battle of Uman; Battle of Stalingrad

Commanders
- Notable commanders: Vasily Askalepov

The 77th Guards Rifle Division was an infantry division of the Soviet Union's Red Army during World War II.

== World War II and Stalingrad ==
The division traces its history to the 21st Division of the Moscow People's Militia, formed in July 1941. In August–September 1941 the division became the 173rd Rifle Division (2nd Formation). The first formation of the division had been destroyed in the Battle of Uman in early August 1941.
From the autumn of 1942, the 173rd Rifle Division participated in the Battle of Stalingrad, leading the defensive and offensive operations north-west of Stalingrad and in the city.

In accordance with Order of the NKO number 104 dated March 1, 1943 173rd Rifle Division was converted to 77th Guards Rifle Division – for successful combat operations on the Stalingrad front. It was part of the 61st Army (June 1943 - February 1944) and the 69th Army (April 1945 - May 1945).

== After World War II ==
Reduced to 10th Brigade 1946–52, became 77th Guards Motor Rifle Division 1957 at Arkhangelsk.

Matvey Burlakov commanded the division from September 1973 to December 1975. In the northern autumn of 1989 transferred to the Northern Fleet and became a coastal defence division. Reduced to 163rd Separate Coastal Defence Brigade on 1 December 1994. Brigade disbanded 1 March 1996. On November 28, 1998, the divisional banner and other regalia were given to the 332nd Naval Infantry Battalion of the Caspian Flotilla, which became the 600th Moscow-Chernigov Naval Infantry Battalion. Reformed as 77th Brigade in December 2000, but disbanded in March 2009, though it appears the two separate subordinate Naval Infantry battalions remained.
