= Bad Sooden-Allendorf =

- Town
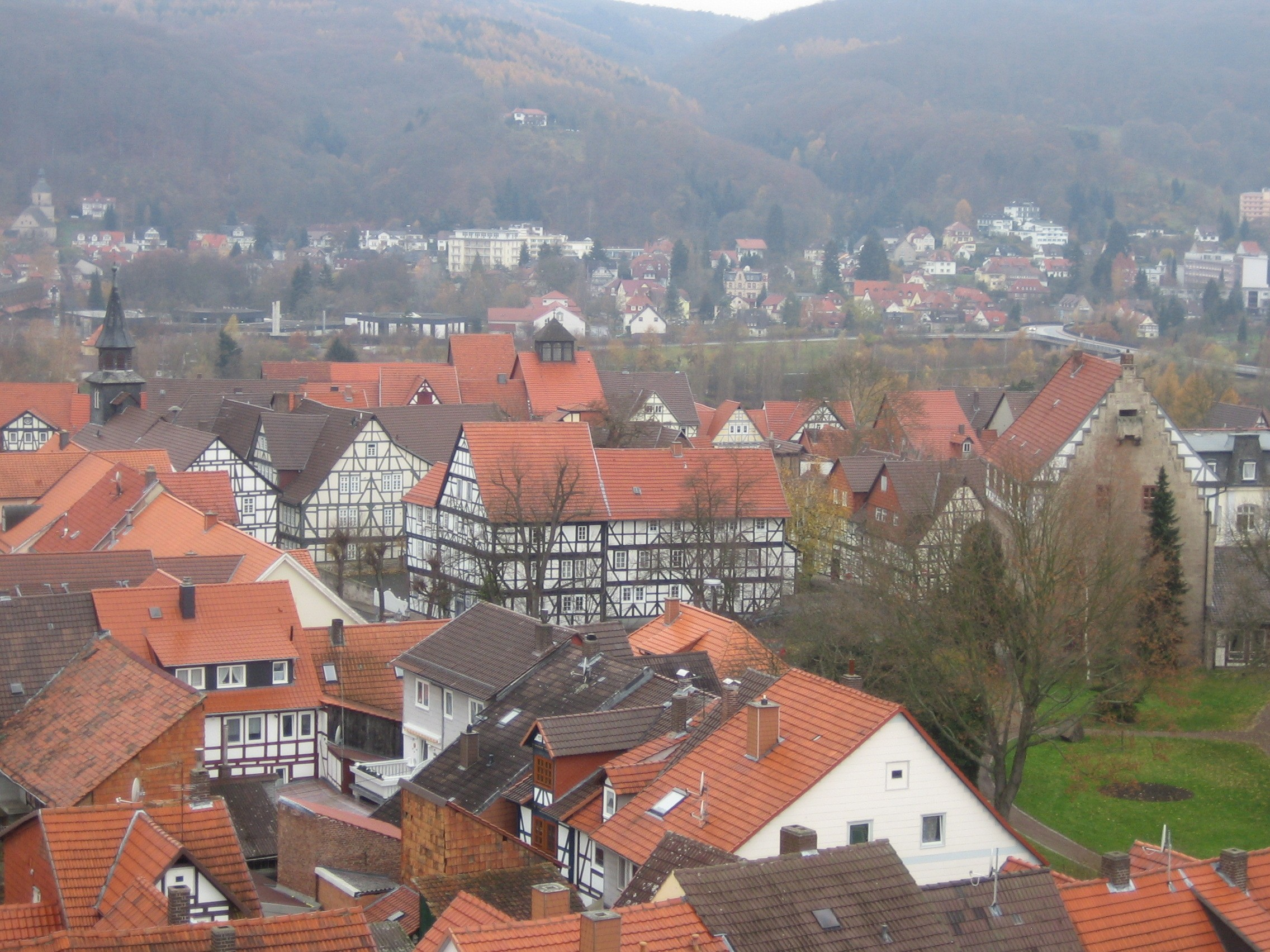
- View over Bad Sooden-Allendorf

- Coat of arms

- Location of Bad Sooden-Allendorf within Werra-Meißner-Kreis district
- Interactive map of Bad Sooden-Allendorf
- Location within Germany Location within Hesse
- Coordinates: 51°17′N 09°59′E
- Country: Germany
- State: Hesse
- Admin. region: Kassel
- District: Werra-Meißner-Kreis

Government
  - Mayor (2021–27): Frank Hix (CDU)

Area
  - Total: 73.75 km^{2} (28.48 sq mi)
- Elevation: 265 m (869 ft)

Population (2025-12-31)
  - Total: 8,242
  - Density: 111.8/km^{2} (289.4/sq mi)
- Time zone: UTC+01:00 (CET)
  - Summer (DST): UTC+02:00 (CEST)
- Postal codes: 37242
- Dialling codes: 05652
- Vehicle registration: ESW
- Website: www.bad-sooden-allendorf.de

Bad Sooden-Allendorf (German pronunciation: [baːt ˈzoːdn̩ ˈʔaləndɔʁf]) is a spa town in the Werra-Meißner-Kreis in Hesse, Germany.

== Geography ==
=== Location ===
The spa town of Bad Sooden-Allendorf lies in the Werra valley near the Hoher Meißner, right on the boundary with Thuringia, almost at Germany's geographical centre, 33 km east of Kassel.

=== Neighbouring communities ===
Bad Sooden-Allendorf borders in the north on the communities of Lindewerra, Wahlhausen and Asbach-Sickenberg, in the east on the communities of Wiesenfeld und Volkerode (all in Thuringia's Eichsfeld district), in the south on the community of Meinhard, the town of Eschwege and the community of Berkatal, in the west on the town of Großalmerode and in the northwest on the town of Witzenhausen (all in the Werra-Meißner-Kreis).

=== Constituent communities ===
Besides the main town, which is also called Bad Sooden-Allendorf, the town has nine other Stadtteile named Ahrenberg, Dudenrode, Ellershausen, Hilgershausen, Kammerbach, Kleinvach, Oberrieden, Orferode and Höfe-Weiden. The main town itself is divided into Sooden and Allendorf, the former of which is west of the railway tracks.

== History ==
The place has existed since at least the late 8th century. This is confirmed by one of the Frankish king Charlemagne’s donation documents, which historians have dated to some time between 776 and 779. With this document, Charlemagne transferred the saltsprings, the saltpans, the saltworkers, the market, the tribute and the toll of the settlement of Westera to the Fulda Abbey. The settlement’s name refers to its location on the western border with Thuringia, which still runs through here today.

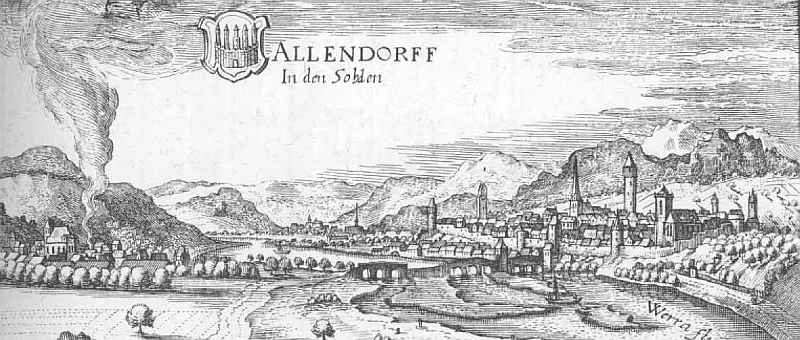
Allendorf - excerpt from the Topographia Hassiae by Matthäus Merian 1655

In April 1637, during the Thirty Years' War, the Geleen and Count Isolani Croatian regiments attacked the town, whereby the town was burnt almost right down. Even the two churches and the town hall were destroyed. The council estate – built wholly out of stone – withstood the great town fire, and still remains preserved today as the town’s oldest building.

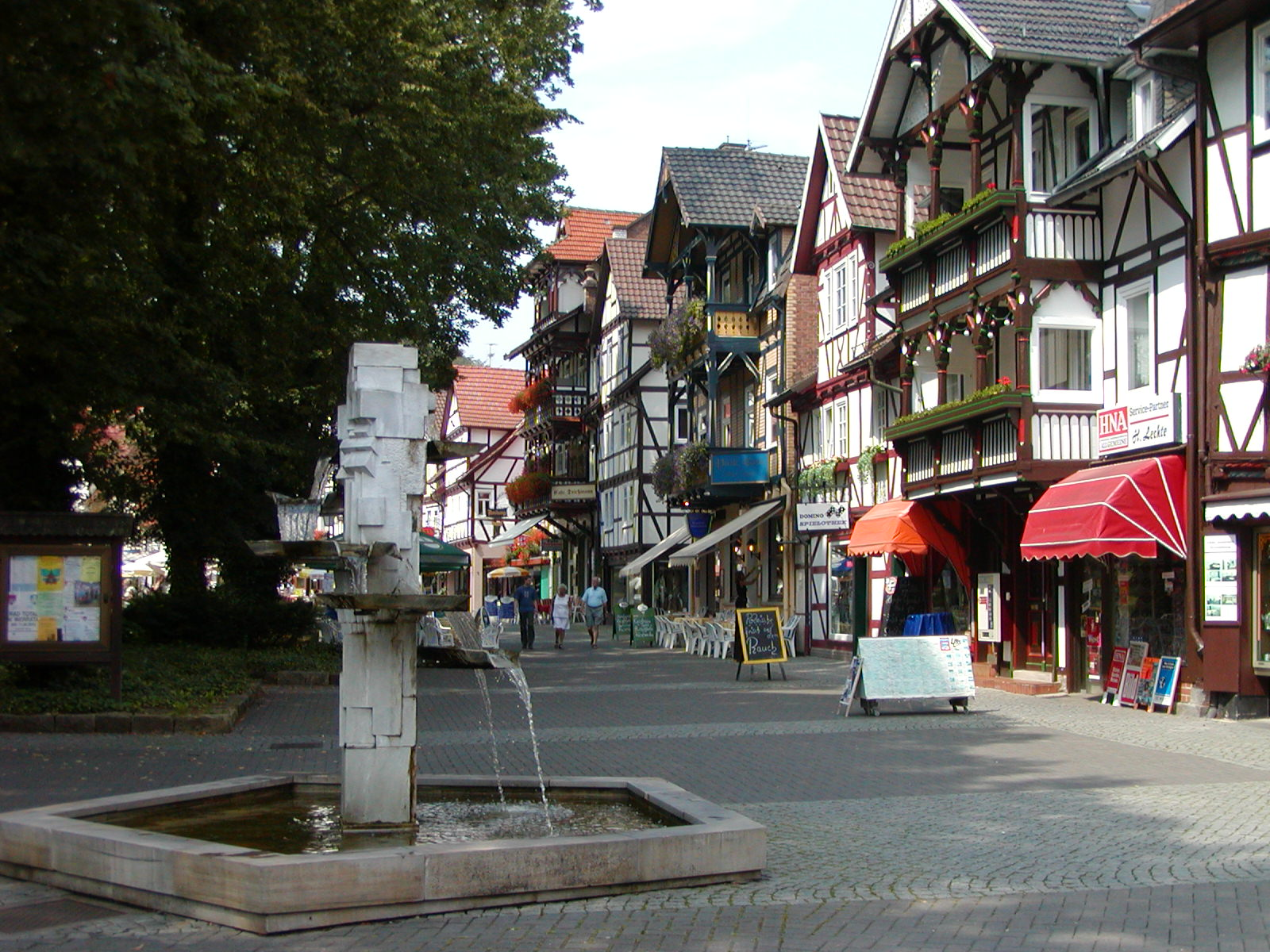
Pedestrian precinct in Bad Sooden-Allendorf

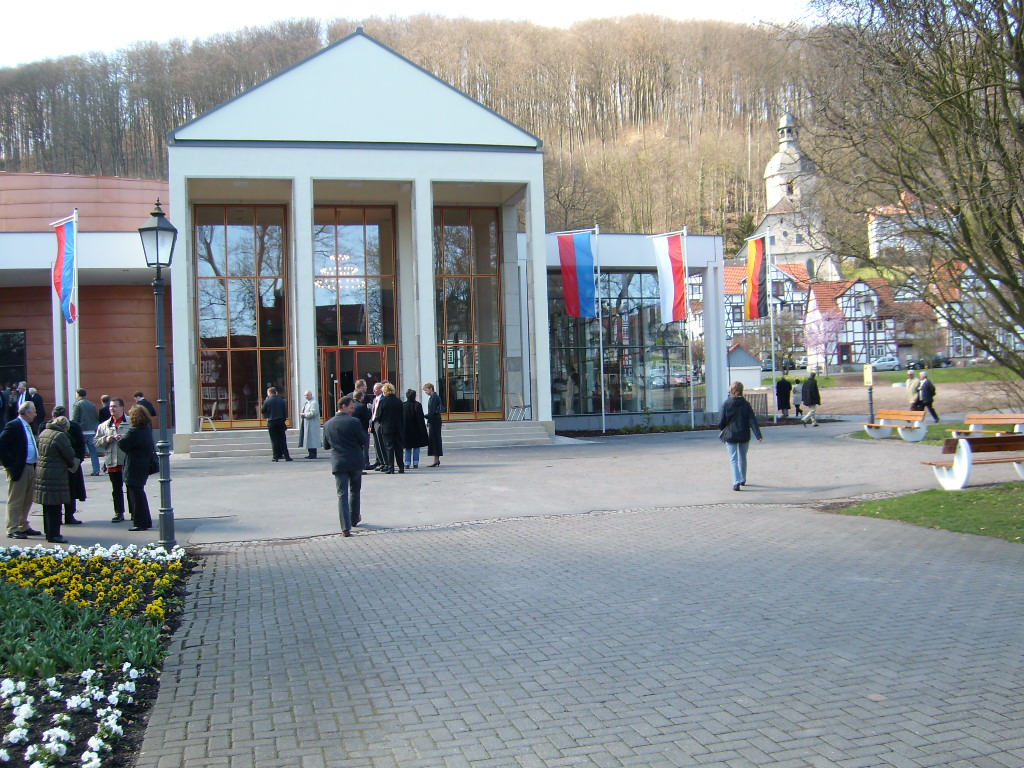
Spa hall entrance area

For more than a thousand years, until the late 19th century, salt was extracted from brine at the saltworks by boiling. The brine was brought up from a deposit under the town. The breaking of the salt monopoly in the wake of annexation by Prussia in 1866 led to a fall in price, which in turn led to the industry’s end. The last salt was produced in 1906.

Along with the downfall of the saltworks, however, came the discovery of the brine’s healing properties, and thus began the spa industry, with a bathhouse opening on 1 June 1881.

Still today, the time of saltmaking is remembered with the Brunnenfest (“Well Festival”) held yearly at Whitsun, when salt is extracted from brine by boiling in an historically authentic process to demonstrate how salt was produced. In a salt museum, the salt is then sold; presented there, as well, is the history of saltmaking.

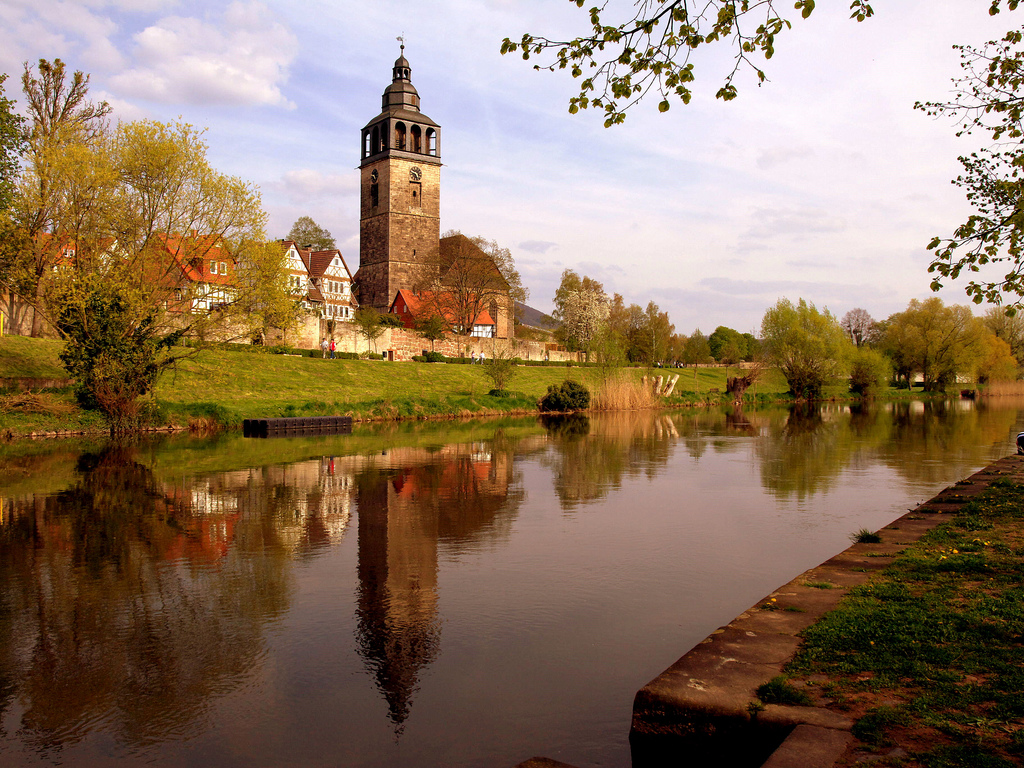
St. Crucius Church in Allendorf

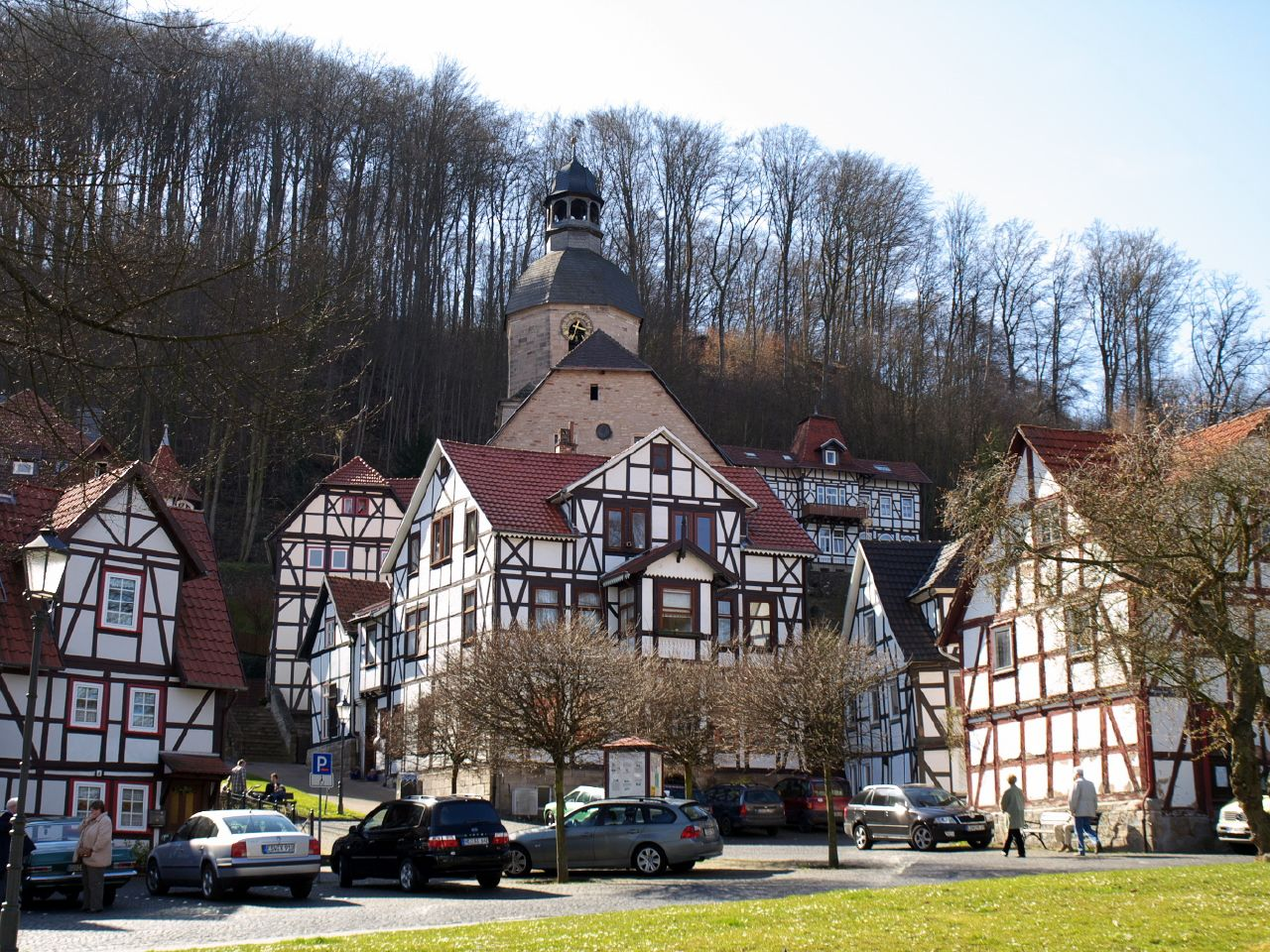
St. Marien Church in Bad Sooden

=== Modernization ===
At the turn of the millennium, the graduation tower was dismantled and completely rebuilt. In late 2005, a new bathhouse with a big sauna area was finished, to lure privately paying guests to town. In April 2007, a new event hall for conventions and concerts was opened. Even the street layout was changed. Since that time there has been no more direct link between Sooden-Nord and Sooden-Süd. Traffic must turn off and take the bypass road through the industrial area. Furthermore, the railway station is currently reduced to two tracks and is being modernized with the goal of establishing a direct link to Sooden. Through these measures the town hopes to work against the downturn in the spa operations by making the bathhouse and spa area easier to reach and making it into a pedestrian precinct.

== Politics ==
=== Town council ===
The municipal election held on 26 March 2006 yielded the following results:

Parties and voter communities		% 2006	Seats 2006	% 2001	Seats 2001
SPD	Social Democratic Party of Germany	41.8	13	38.8	12
CDU	Christian Democratic Union of Germany	36.8	11	32.7	10
GREENS	Bündnis 90/Die Grünen	9.1	3	9.5	3
FWG	Freie Wählergemeinschaft	7.6	2	10.0	3
FDP	Free Democratic Party	4.7	2	5.9	2
REP	The Republicans	–	–	3.1	1
Total		100	31	100	31
Voter turnout in %		53.9		55.4	

=== Mayors ===
The town's mayor is Frank Hix (Party of CDU). He won the mayoral contest on 2 November 2008 between him and Thomas Giese (Party of SPD).

List of former mayors of Allendorf (up to the union with Sooden in 1929) and of Bad Sooden-Allendorf (from 1929):

- Frank Hix (since 2009)
- Ronald Gundlach (March 1997 to 2009)
- Erich Giese (1991 to 1997)
- Rolf Jenther (1984 to resign in 1991, shortly after the re-election)
- Rolf Erich Barié (1978–1984)
- Gerhard Harke (1960–1978)
- Fritz Franke (April 1946 to 1960, acting since September 1945)
- Wilhelm Siebert (June 1945 – September 1945)
- Fritz Haase (April 1945 – June 1945)
- Cornelius Bents (January 1945 to April 1945)
- Ferdinand Schneider (May 1930 – December 1944)
- Dr. jur. Karl Eulert (August 1925 – April 1930)
- Charles Leimbach (December 1923 to July 1925, City Treasurer / Acting Mayor)
- Adolf Müller (January 1898 – December 1923)
- Georg Ludwig Oeste (June 1877 – July 1897)
- Leutnand A.D. Hugo Jesse (January 1874 – May 1876)
- Kroeschell Otto Heinrich (1853–1873)
- Christian August Seyl (1834–1852)
- Lorenz Heinrich Stephan (1808 to 1813 but no mayor, during the Westphalian time)
- Barthold Storm (+ -1650)

The following list shows the names of the families of the 19th century - since about 1400 - the owner, almost "tenant" in the Mayor's Office in Allendort (it does not claim to be exhaustive, sorted alphabetically with no annual figures). They were the patricians, the City Council:

Brandt, Breul, Casselmann, Cörper/Corper, Deichmann, Diede, Dietz, Dörr, Eschstruht, Frohn, Gaule, Gehrung, Gille, Grau, Grebe, Grunewald, Gundlach, Haas, von Haagen, Hupfeld, Hüter, Iring, von Jossa, Isenhuth, Kirchmeyer, Klinkerfuß, Königsee, Kraft, Kröschell, Lappe, Lutemann, Marold, Mattenberg, Meinhard, Jost Motz (um 1620), Müller, Neuenroth, Niedenstein, Geißler Praesendt (um 1585), Prediger, Quentel, Ruland, Saame, Schaffnicht, Heinrich Schaub (um 1440), Schmidt, Schnödde, Stephan, Storm, Thaurer, Tholde, Thorey, Valentin, Vielmeder, Vietor, Wagner, Weber, Wehr, Wissenbach, Wolff

=== Coat of arms ===
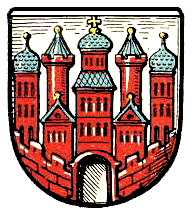
Coat of Arms of Allendorf

The town's arms might be described thus: Gules a town wall embattled with gate tower and four towers within (used from the old Allendorf Coat of Arms), the whole argent with roofs azure, in the gateway arch a saltpan hook and a Berlaff (wooden spoon for hastening brine evaporation, used from the old Sooden Coat of Arms) in saltire Or.

The arms were approved by the State Archive in 1931.

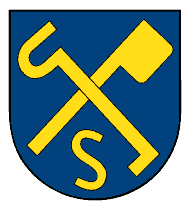
Coat of Arms of Sooden

=== Town partnerships ===
Bad Sooden-Allendorf maintains partnership arrangements with these towns:

- Landivisiau, Finistère, France since 1974
- (Germany) Bad Frankenhausen, Thuringia since 1990

== Culture and sightseeing ==
=== Museums ===
- Schifflersgrund Border Museum

This museum stands right on the former “death strip” between East and West Germany, although nowadays it is only the boundary between Hesse and Thuringia. It houses, besides old border installations and a range of old military vehicles and helicopters, a visual and detailed history of the Inner German Border.

=== Buildings ===
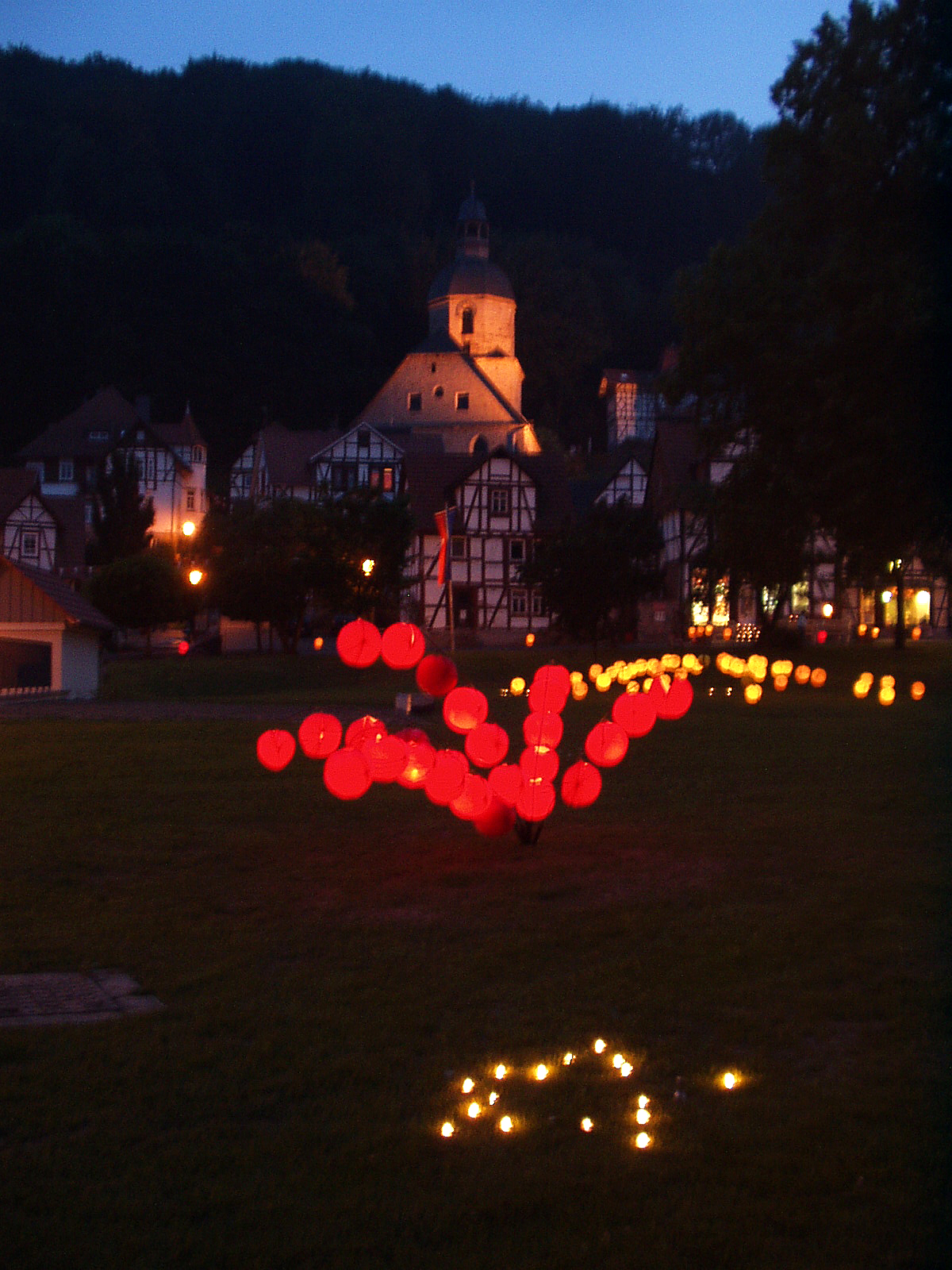
Bad Sooden, floodlighting 2007

- “Well Before the Gate”

This became the subject of a well known German folksong Am Brunnen vor dem Tore. The well with the linden tree – also mentioned in the song – is still preserved, and the gate was rebuilt in 1997.

- Graduation tower

This is one of Germany’s last graduation towers, having been thoroughly overhauled in the last ten years, and is a popular recreation spot.

- Werratal-Therme (“Werra Valley Bathhouse”)

This is a bathhouse with brine, sauna and outdoor area. The graduation tower can be reached from here without leaving the bathhouse area.

- Diebesturm (“Thief’s Tower”)
- Historic timber-frame Old Town

=== Regular events ===
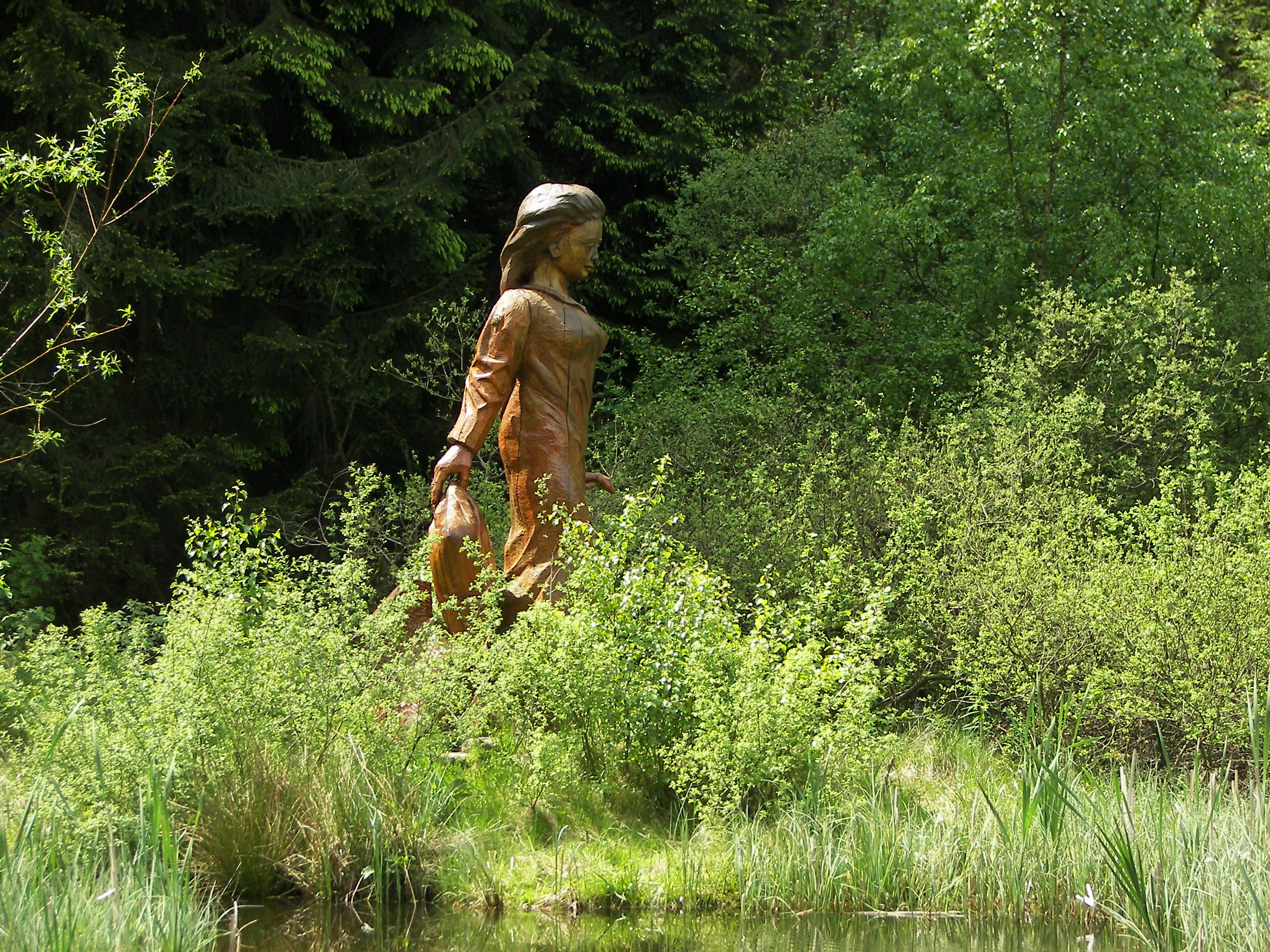
Frau Holle on the Hoher Meißner

Bad Sooden-Allendorf is nationally known for the Erntedank- und Heimatfest (roughly “Thanksgiving and Homeland Festival”), which is celebrated each year through the third weekend in August (Friday to Tuesday). Above all, it is popular for its many traditions, having been celebrated for more than a hundred years with the same programme. The highlights are:

- Street festival in the Old Town (Friday), midway on the festival square (Saturday to Tuesday)
- Torchlight procession followed by a military tattoo and the festival of lights (“Werra in Flames”)
- Triolett dance, a round dance with two threesomes
- Spanisch Fricco – food
- Great festival parade on Sunday
- Rich decoration of the town with garlands and harvest crowns made of grain

Every year in the week after Easter, the traditional Märchenwoche (“Fairytale Week”) is held in Bad Sooden-Allendorf. Many events such as “fairytale evenings” and theatrical productions bring fairy tales into the world, framed by daily appearances by fairytale characters in the spa park. At the focus stands Frau Holle, who is said to have lived on the nearby Hoher Meißner and to have daily shaken the featherbeds out in the historic Söder Tor (“Sooden Gate”)

=== Cuisine ===
Spanish fricco is a traditional stew dish of Bad Sooden-Allendorf.

== Economy and infrastructure ==
=== Transport ===
- Bad Sooden-Allendorf is linked to the Autobahn network by Bundesstraße 27 (Witzenhausen–Eschwege).
- The central railway station lies on the north-south Göttingen–Bebra–Fulda line.
- There is a town bus system.
- The nearest airport is Kassel Calden Airport.
- The Werra is not usable by big ships. Canoe traffic is, however, quite lively.
- A recreational vehicle park in the Old Town and near the Werra attracts caravans.
- There are also hiking and cycling paths.

=== Media ===
- The Witzenhäuser Allgemeine, a local edition of the Hessische/Niedersächsische Allgemeine, appears as a daily newspaper.
- Moreover, the MB-Media-Verlag (publisher), which through the Ippen Group likewise belongs to Hessische/Niedersächsische Allgemeine, publishes two weekly newspapers named Marktspiegel and Extra-Tip, which do not, however, give themselves over to quite as many regional issues as many other tabloids.
- Publication of the BSA-Kurier, an advertising paper for the local Kurpark-Hotel, whose fliers in the end were also acquired by Hessische/Niedersächsische Allgemeine, has been suspended. Club reports and cultural announcements were found in this paper.
- A Stadtblättchen is published by Verlag Linus-Wittich for a few subscribing customers.
- Furthermore, the local radio station Rundfunk Meißner (RFM), named after the nearby mountain, Hoher Meißner, can be picked up in town.

=== Education ===
Bad Sooden-Allendorf offers with the primary school Am Brunnen vor dem Tore (classes 1 to 4) and the Rhenanusschule (classes 5 to 13) a full range of education without changing location or daily travel, something that can no longer be taken for granted in the Werra-Meißner-Kreis. Integrated into the Rhenanusschule is a sport Gymnasium with adjoining boarding school, which once produced famous sportsmen.

With a location of the Bernd-Blindow-Schulen, the town has for some years also been a university town.

== Notable people ==
- Burkard Waldis (around 1490–1556), fabulist, playwright and Shrove Author
- Johannes Gottsleben (for 1559/60–1612), Protestant theologian in the age of Reformation
- Bernhard Textor (around 1560–1602), reformed theologian
- Ferdinand von Wintzingerode (1770–1818), nobleman and officer in various armies, most recently General of Russian army

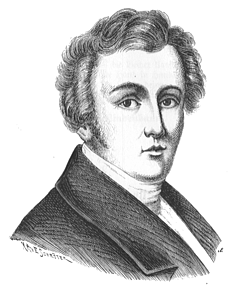
Wilhelm Müller

- Ludwig Rehn (1849–1930), surgeon
- Gerhard Ritter (1888–1967), historian
- Wilhelm Müller (1794–1827), romantic poet, who wrote here among other things the beginning of "Das Wandern ist des Müllers Lust", which became popular as a song
- Eberhardt Eichner, superintendent

=== Personalities who have worked or lived in Bad Sooden-Allendorf ===
- Wilhelm Speck (1861–1925), writer, poet, Evangelical pastor, chaplain and teacher
- Sigurd Lohde (1899–1977), film and television actor
