= Oberrieden (Bad Sooden-Allendorf) =

- Stadtteil of Bad Sooden-Allendorf
- Interactive map of Oberrieden
- Location within Germany Location within Hesse
- Coordinates: 51°18′N 9°55′E
- Country: Germany
- State: Hesse
- Admin. region: Kassel
- District: Werra-Meißner
- Town: Bad Sooden-Allendorf

Area
  - Total: 6.78 km^{2} (2.62 sq mi)
- Elevation: 150 m (490 ft)

Population
  - Total: 650
  - Density: 96/km^{2} (250/sq mi)
- Time zone: UTC+01:00 (CET)
  - Summer (DST): UTC+02:00 (CEST)
- Postal codes: 37242
- Dialling codes: 05542
- Vehicle registration: ESW + WIZ
- Website: Oberrieden

Oberrieden is a village in the northern part of Hesse, Germany. First recorded mention was in 1150. Since 1971 it belongs to the town of Bad Sooden-Allendorf.

== Location ==
The village of Oberrieden lies in the Werra valley near the Hoher Meißner, right on the boundary with Thuringia, almost at Germany's geographical centre, 33 km east of Kassel. The Bebra-Göttingen railway touches the village in the east.

== Neighbouring villages ==
Oberrieden borders in the east on the community of Lindewerra (Thuringia's Eichsfeld district), in the south on the village of Ellershausen, in the west on the village Hilgershausen and in the north on the villages of Werleshausen and Wendershausen (town of Witzenhausen).

== Gallery ==
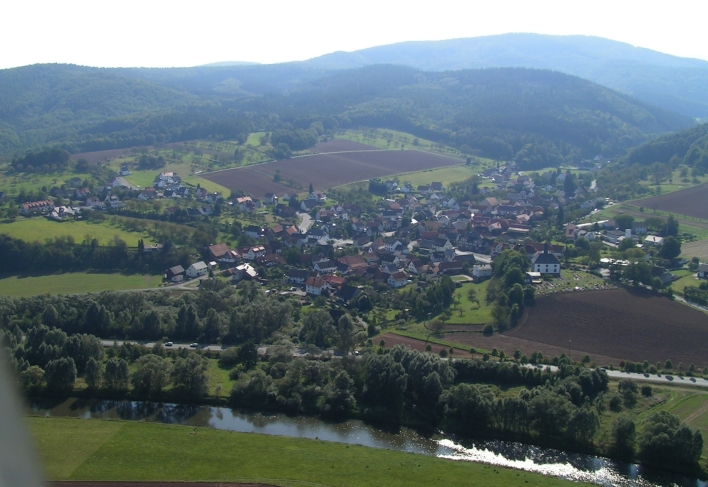
From air

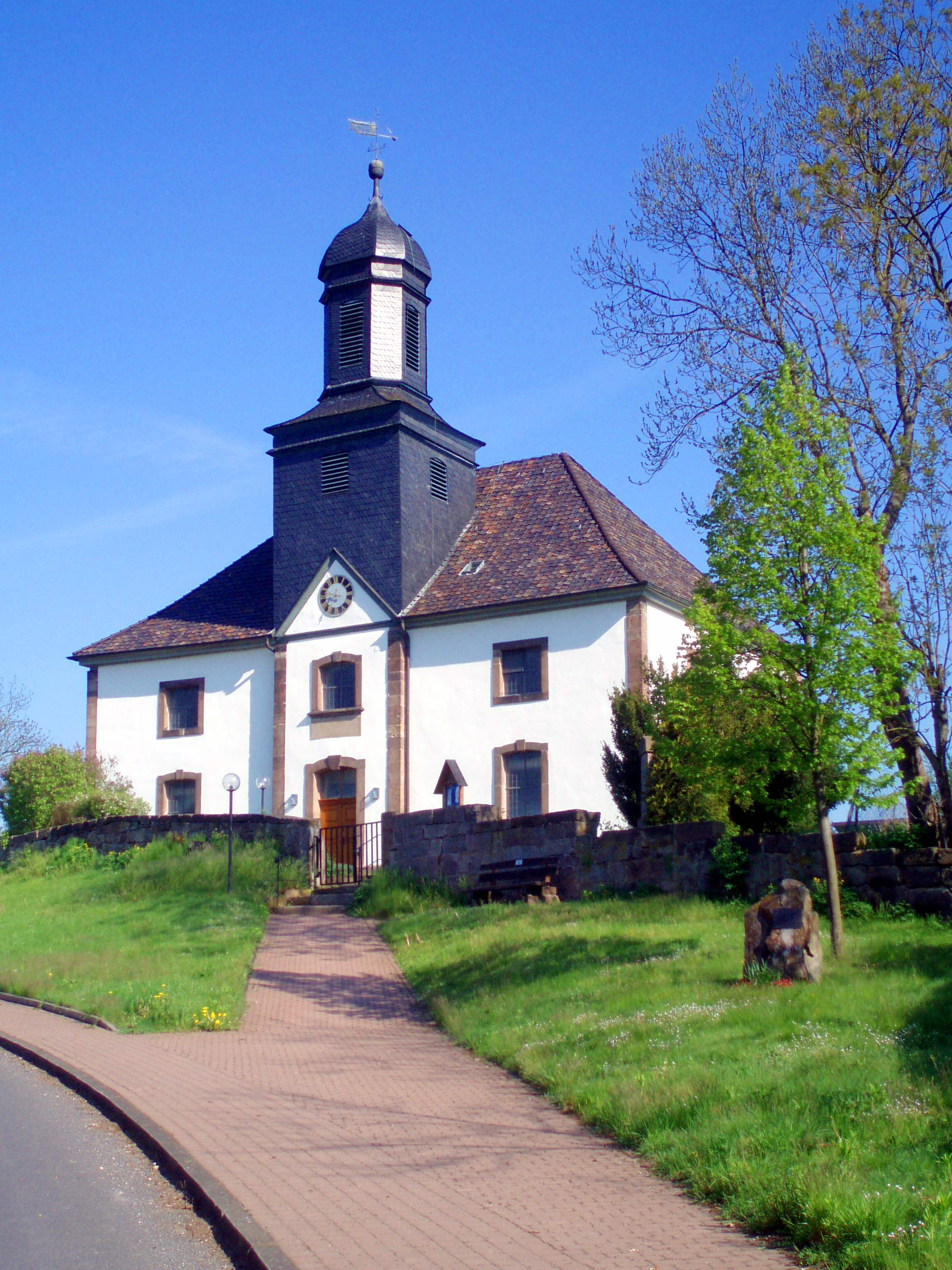
Church

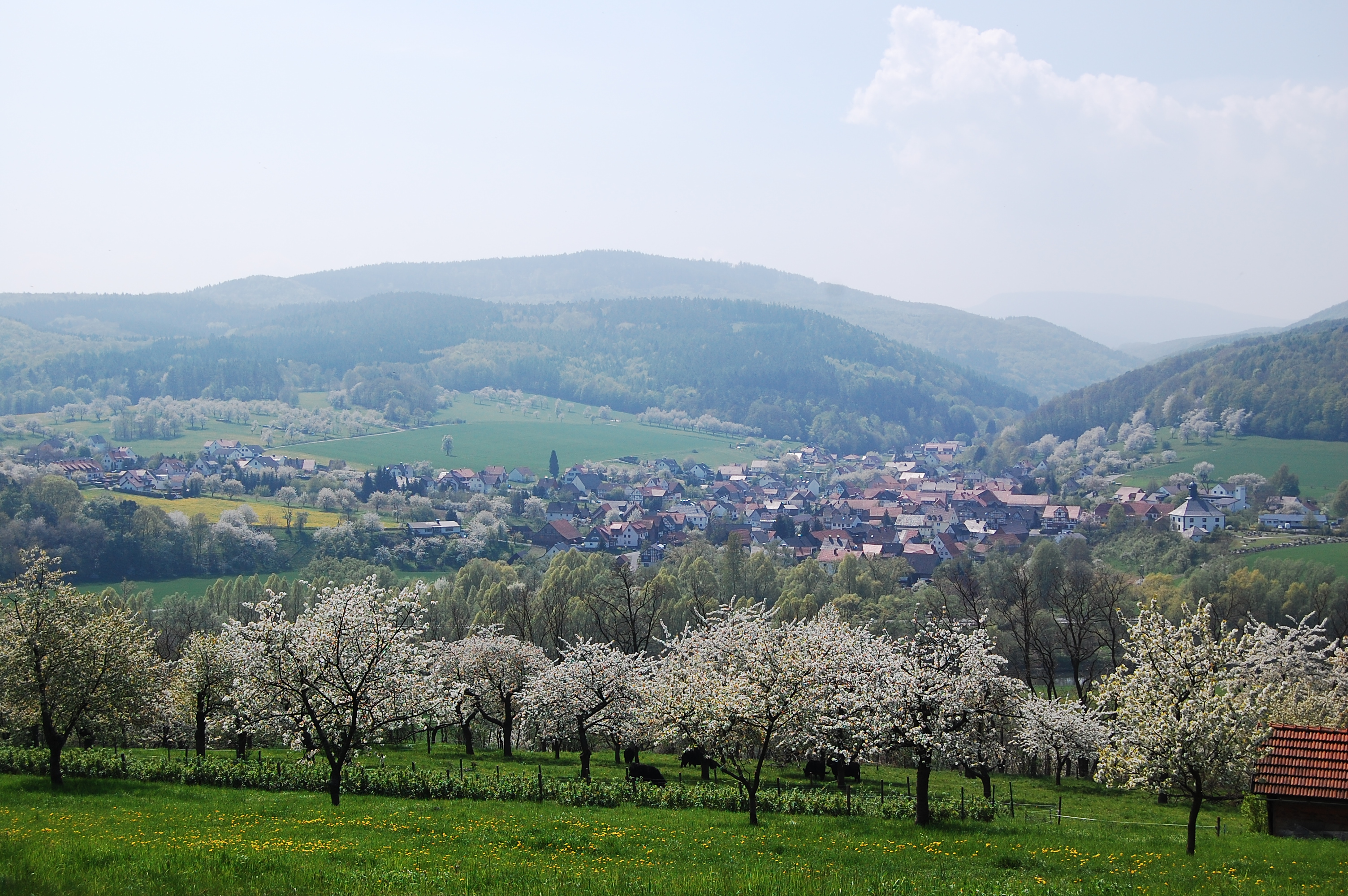
Blossom of cherry tries
