= Milton B. Halsey =

U.S. Army major general

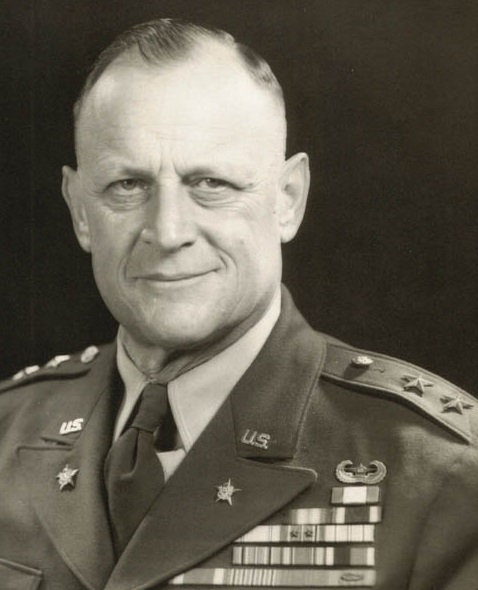
- Halsey as a major general, circa 1946
- Born: March 6, 1894; Huntsville, Alabama, U.S.
- Died: October 24, 1990 (aged 96); Monterey, California, U.S.
- Burial place: San Francisco National Cemetery
- Education: United States Military Academy; United States Army Command and General Staff College
- Spouse: Kathryne H. Crandall (m. 1926–1990)
- Children: 2
- Military career
- Service: United States Army
- Service years: 1917–1953
- Rank: Major General
- Service number: 0-5305
- Unit: U.S. Army Infantry Branch
- Commands: 2nd Battalion, 35th Infantry Regiment; 12th Infantry Regiment; 97th Infantry Division; U.S. Army Yokohama Command; Sixth United States Army
- Wars: Mexican Border War; World War I Occupation of the Rhineland; World War II; Occupation of Japan
- Awards: Army Distinguished Service Medal; Legion of Honor (Chevalier) (France); Croix de Guerre with palm (France); Military Order of the White Lion (Czechoslovakia); Czechoslovak War Cross
- Other work: Consultant, Lockheed Corporation Space and Missile Division

Milton B. Halsey (March 6, 1894 – October 24, 1990) was a career officer in the United States Army. A 1917 graduate of the United States Military Academy, he was a veteran of the Mexican Border War, World War I, Occupation of the Rhineland, World War II, and the Occupation of Japan. Halsey attained the rank of major general, and his awards and decorations included the Army Distinguished Service Medal, Legion of Honor (Chevalier) (France), Croix de Guerre with palm (France), Military Order of the White Lion (Czechoslovakia), and Czechoslovak War Cross.

== Early life ==
Milton Baldridge Halsey was born in Huntsville, Alabama on March 6, 1894, a son of Charles H. Halsey and Elizabeth “Lizzie” (Acklen) Halsey. He attended the public schools of Huntsville, and was a 1912 graduate of Huntsville High School. Halsey was elected president of his senior class.

Halsey attended the University of Alabama from September 1912 to March 1913. While in college, he joined the Delta Kappa Epsilon fraternity. He left the University of Alabama after receiving an appointment to the United States Military Academy (West Point) from U.S. Representative William Richardson. He then attended courses at Marion Military Institute to prepare for the West Point entrance examination, which he passed in early June 1913.

Halsey attended West Point from June 14, 1913, until April 20, 1917, exactly two weeks after the American entry into World War I, when he graduated 104th in his class of 139. He received his commission as a second lieutenant of Infantry.

== Start of career ==
After receiving his commission, Halsey was assigned to the 35th Infantry Regiment at Camp Stephen D. Little in Nogales, Arizona. He performed security patrols duty during the Mexican Border War, and was promoted to first lieutenant on May 15, 1917. With the army expanding at the start of World War I, he was promoted to temporary captain on August 5, 1917, and in October he was posted to Fort Sill, Oklahoma to complete the officer's course at the Infantry School of Arms.

In November, Halsey returned to the 35th Infantry in Nogales, where he briefly served as a company commander. From December 1917 to April 1918, he served with the 13th Machine Gun Battalion (later the 15th Machine Gun Battalion) at Fort Sam Houston, Texas. From April to August 1918, he was regimental adjutant of the 35th Infantry, which was serving as Camp Travis, Texas. He commanded a company of the 54th Machine Gun Battalion at Camp Travis from November 1918 to February 1919. He was briefly attached to the 19th Infantry Regiment at Camp Travis, then commanded a company of the 54th Machine Gun Battalion from March to June, 1919.

From June to September 1919, Halsey again served as adjutant of the 35th Infantry, and he was promoted to permanent captain in September 1919. In October 1919, Halsey assumed command of a company in the 50th Infantry Regiment at Camp Dix, New Jersey. The 50th Infantry traveled to Europe in November 1919, and Halsey was assigned as regimental adjutant during the organization's Occupation of the Rhineland duty in Mayen.

== Continued career ==
After returning to the United States in December 1921, Halsey was assigned to command a company of the 16th Infantry Regiment at Fort Jay, New York. From August 1923 to May 1924, he was a student in the company officer's course at the Fort Benning, Georgia Infantry School. From May to July 1924, he was an instructor in tactics on the West Point faculty. From July 1924 to June 1928, he served in the personnel division on the general staff at the United States Department of War. In June 1928, he was assigned to command a company of the 12th Infantry Regiment at Fort Washington, Maryland. In April 1930, he was assigned as adjutant of the Fort Washington garrison staff.

From August 1931 to May 1933, Halsey was a student at the United States Army Command and General Staff College, and he was promoted to major in January 1933. From May to August 1933, he served at the Fort Sam Houston Civilian Conservation Corps shipping depot. From August 1933 to August 1935, he served on the staff of the war plans division for the Eighth Corps Area at Fort Sam Houston. Halsey served as the combined assistant chief of staff for personnel (G-1) and assistant chief of staff for logistics (G-4) on the Eighth Corps Area staff from August 1935 to August 1937.

In September 1937, Halsey was assigned to the staff of the 35th Infantry Regiment at Schofield Barracks, Hawaii. In January 1938, he assumed command of the regiment's 2nd Battalion. In September 1939, he was assigned as assistant to the deputy chief of staff for plans and operations (G-3) on the staff of the Hawaiian Department at Fort Shafter. In May 1940, Halsey was posted to the staff of the War Plans Division on the War Department General Staff, and he was promoted to lieutenant colonel in July.

== Later career ==
As the army expanded for entry into World War II, In December 1941, he was promoted to temporary colonel and assigned to command the 12th Infantry Regiment at Fort Benning, then named chief of staff for the 29th Infantry Division. In May 1942, Halsey was promoted to temporary brigadier general and assigned as assistant division commander of the 44th Infantry Division at Fort Lewis, Washington.

In January 1944, Halsey was assigned to command the 97th Infantry Division at Fort Leonard Wood, Missouri. He led the division during its organization and training for deployment to the Pacific theater. When additional divisions were required in Europe after the Battle of the Bulge, the 97th Division was reallocated, and Halsey commanded it during combat in the Central Europe Campaign. After the surrender of Germany in May 1945, the division reorganized and retrained in anticipation of entering combat in Japan. The Surrender of Japan took place in August, the 97th Division arrived in October, after which it took part in the post-war occupation. The awards Halsey received for his Second World War service included the: Army Distinguished Service Medal; French Legion of Honor (Chevalier); French Croix de Guerre with palm; Military Order of the White Lion (Czechoslovakia); and Czechoslovak War Cross.

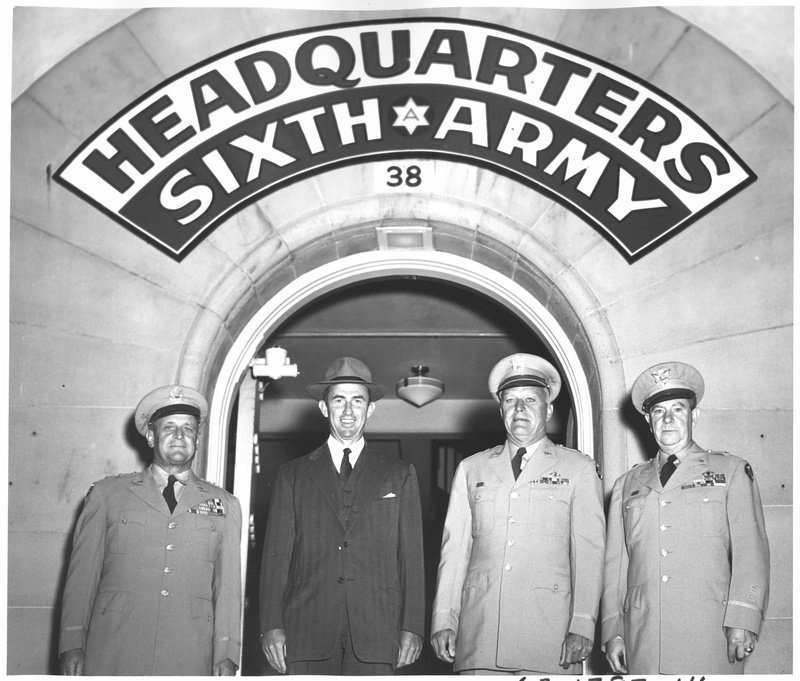
(Left to right): Major General Milton B. Halsey, Secretary of Army Frank Pace, Lieutenant General Joseph May Swing, and Brigadier General William T. Sexton stand in front of the Sixth Army Headquarters on September 16, 1952.

Halsey served as chief of staff for First Service Command at South Boston Army Base from October 1945 to July 1946. He was promoted to temporary major general in January 1946, and held this rank until the following July. In July 1946, he returned to Japan, first as commander of the U.S. Army Yokohama Command, then as chief of staff for Eighth United States Army. He was again promoted to temporary major general in January 1948, and in February 1949 was assigned as assistant chief of staff for plans and operations (G-3) on the staff of the chief of Army Field Forces at Fort Monroe, Virginia.

In January 1951, Halsey was assigned as deputy commander of Sixth United States Army, which was headquartered at the Presidio of San Francisco. Following the June 1951 retirement of Sixth Army commander Albert Coady Wedemeyer, Halsey as acting commander until the arrival of Wedemeyer's permanent replacement in August. Halsey retired in January 1953.

== Retirement and death ==
After retiring from the military, Halsey was employed for several years as a consultant with the space and missile division of the Lockheed Corporation. Halsey died in Monterey, California on October 24, 1990. He was buried at San Francisco National Cemetery.

== Family ==
In 1926, Halsey married Kathryne H. Crandall. They were the parents of two children, Kathryn and Milton Jr.
