= William T. Sexton =

United States Army general

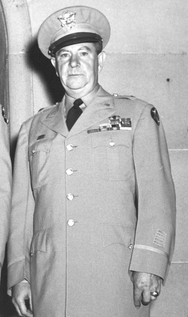
- Sexton in 1952
- Born: William Thaddeus Sexton; September 3, 1901; Leavenworth, Kansas, U.S.
- Died: June 22, 1983 (aged 81); San Antonio, Texas, U.S.
- Burial place: Arlington National Cemetery
- Spouse(s): Mary Forester Lewis (m. 1950; died 1980) Mary Weber Willey (m. 1982)
- Military career
- Allegiance: United States of America
- Branch: United States Army
- Service years: 1924–1956
- Rank: Major General
- Commands: 5th Infantry Division; 82nd Airborne Division Artillery; 3rd Infantry Division (Acting); 3rd Infantry Division Artillery
- Awards: Legion of Merit; Bronze Star with three Oak Leaf Clusters; Legion of Honor; Croix de Guerre; Order of Bogdan Khmelnitskiy Second Class (USSR); Order of Liaquat (Iran)

William Thaddeus Sexton (September 3, 1901 – June 22, 1983) was a major general of the United States Army who participated in World War II.

== Biography ==
William Thaddeus Sexton was born on September 3, 1901, to James William Sexton and his wife Fannie (Davis) Sexton.

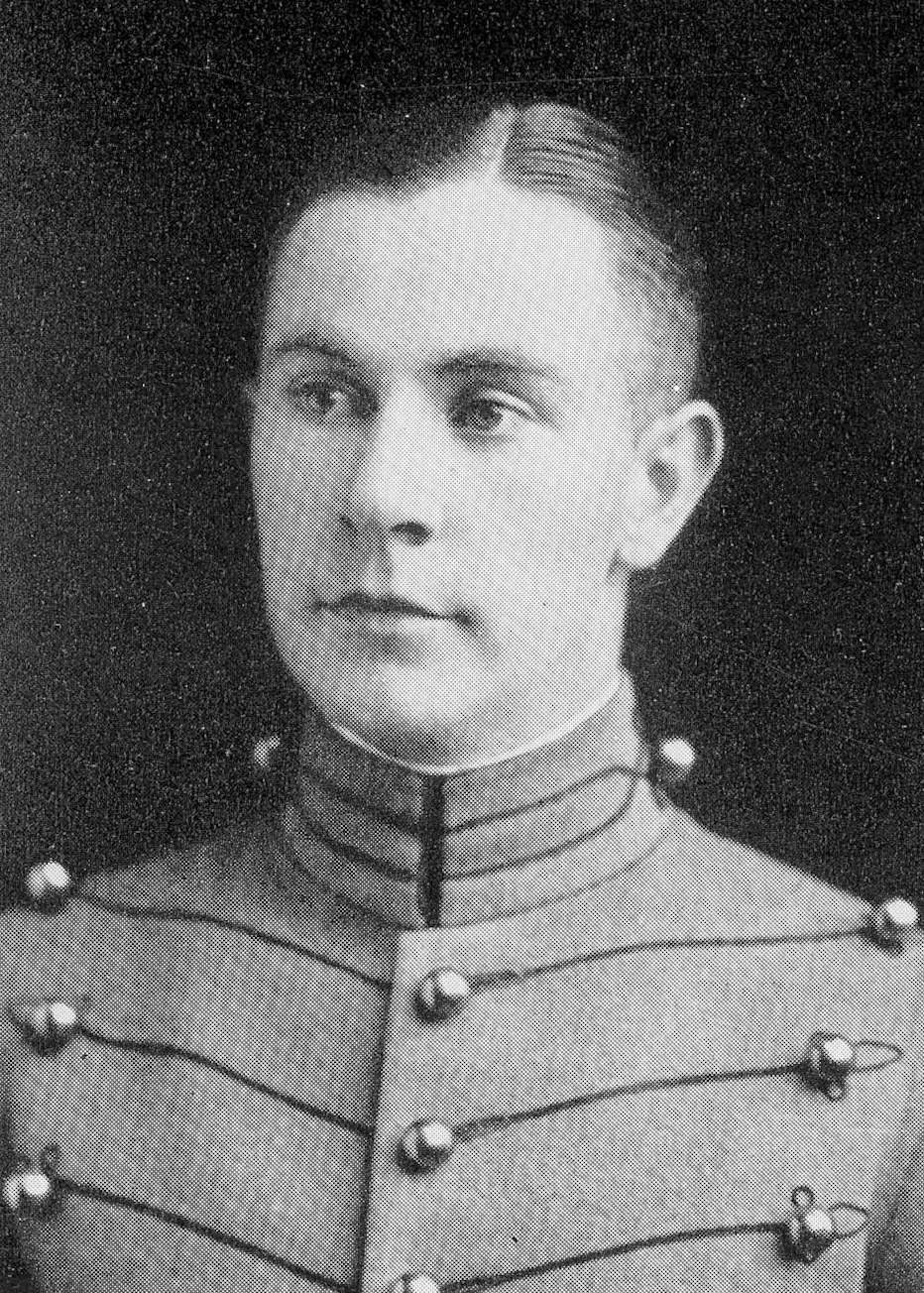
At West Point in 1924

From 1918 until 1919, Sexton attended the University of Kansas. From July 1, 1920, until June 12, 1924, Sexton was a cadet at the U.S. Military Academy at West Point and subsequently promoted to second lieutenant of field artillery. His ensuing military education involved Field Artillery School, which he graduated from in 1930 with a promotion to first lieutenant of field artillery on October 20, 1929 and Signal School in 1934.

From 1936 to 1939, he taught history at West Point. In 1939, Sexton, who had reached the rank of captain in the meantime, published Soldiers in the sun: An adventure in imperialism. The book provides a military history of operations in the Philippines form 1898 to 1902, discussing the Philippine Insurrection based on published official documents, supported by maps and illustrations.

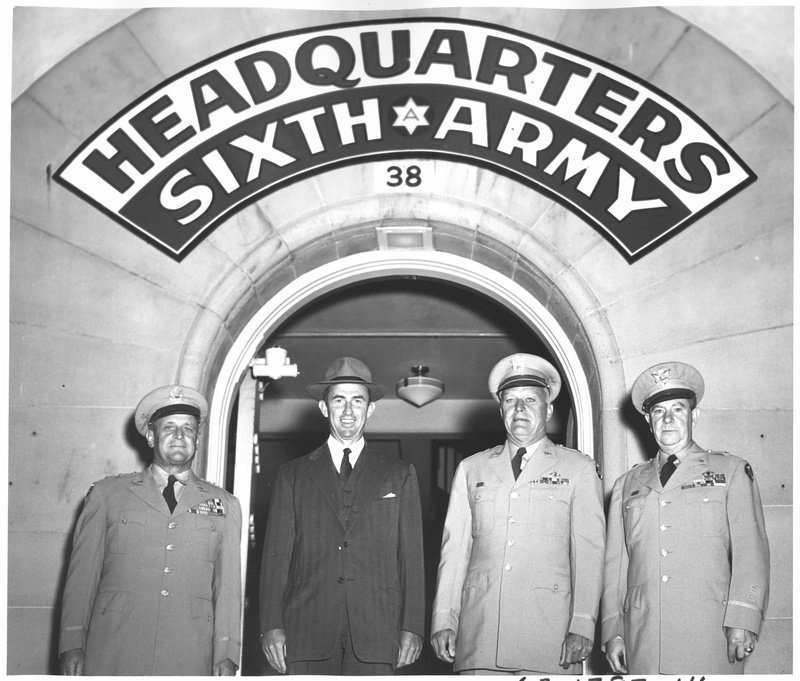
(Left to right): Major General Milton B. Halsey, Secretary of Army Frank Pace, Lieutenant General Joseph M. Swing, and Brigadier General William T. Sexton stand in front of the Sixth Army Headquarters on September 16, 1952.

In 1940, Sexton attended Command and General Staff School and was made Assistant Secretary in the Office of the Chief of Staff. Later in the war, Sexton became Secretary in the Office of the Chief of Staff from 1943 until 1944. He then became commanding general of the 3rd Infantry Division Artillery, earning four Bronze Star Medals in Europe.

On September 17, 1945, Sexton who was Brigadier General and acting commanding general of the 3rd Infantry Division at the time, signed the Wanfried Agreement in his capacity as representative of the American High Command. The treaty enforced boundary changes between the U.S. and Soviet zone of occupation in Germany.

After World War II, Sexton served as a military attaché in Iran. He married Mary Forester Lewis in 1950.

In 1951, Sexton attended Parachute School and then became commanding general of the 82nd Airborne Division Artillery at Fort Bragg. After serving as chief of staff of the Sixth Army at the Presidio of San Francisco, he became the first chief of the Military Assistance Advisory Group, Pakistan in 1954.

This was followed by his final promotion to major general in 1955. Sexton served as commanding general of the 5th Infantry Division in West Germany from July 1955 to February 1956. After serving as Deputy Inspector General of the U.S. Army, he retired from active duty on August 31, 1956.

After his first wife's death in 1980, Sexton married Mary Weber Willey on October 15, 1982.

He died in San Antonio on June 22, 1983, and was buried at Arlington National Cemetery.
