= Werleshausen =

- Stadtteil of Witzenhausen
- Interactive map of Werleshausen
- Location within Germany Location within Hesse
- Coordinates: 51°19′30″N 9°54′50″E
- Country: Germany
- State: Hesse
- Admin. region: Kassel
- District: Werra-Meißner
- Town: Witzenhausen

Area
  - Total: 6.78 km^{2} (2.62 sq mi)
- Elevation: 140 m (460 ft)

Population
  - Total: 500
  - Density: 74/km^{2} (190/sq mi)
- Time zone: UTC+01:00 (CET)
  - Summer (DST): UTC+02:00 (CEST)
- Postal codes: 37214
- Dialling codes: 05542
- Vehicle registration: ESW + WIZ

Werleshausen is a village in the northern part of Hesse, Germany. First recorded mention was in 876. Since 1972 it belongs to the town of Witzenhausen.

== Location ==
The village of Werleshausen lies in the Werra valley near the Hoher Meißner, right on the boundary with Thuringia, almost at Germany's geographical centre, 33 km east of Kassel. The Bebra-Göttingen railway crosses the village in the east.

== Neighbouring villages ==
Werleshausen borders in the east on the municipalities of Lindewerra and Bornhagen (Thuringia's Eichsfeld district), in the south on the village of Oberrieden, in the west on the village Wendershausen and in the north on the villages of Unterrieden and Neuseesen (town of Witzenhausen).

== Sightseeing ==
- Historic framework buildings in the village core
- Manor
- Ludwigstein Castle
- Hanstein Castle (Bornhagen)
- Devil's rock ("Teufelskanzel") near Lindewerra

== Gallery ==
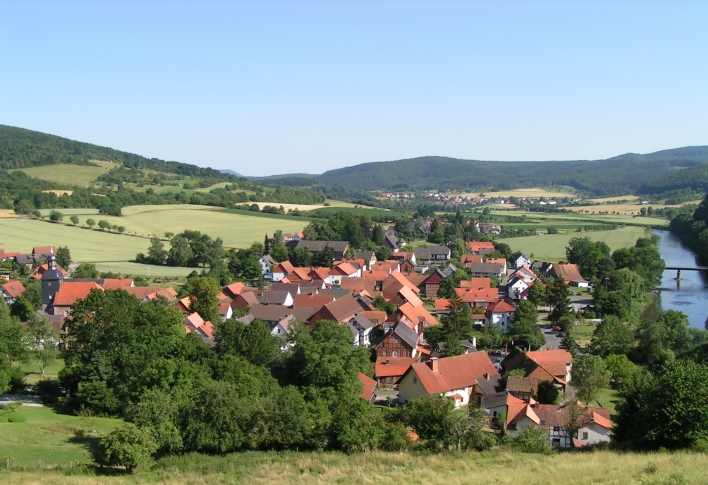
Village view

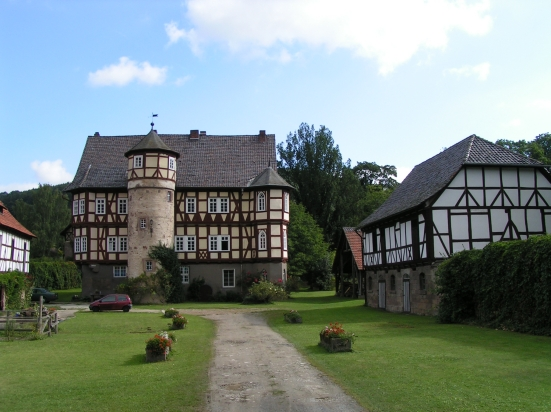
Manor in Werleshausen

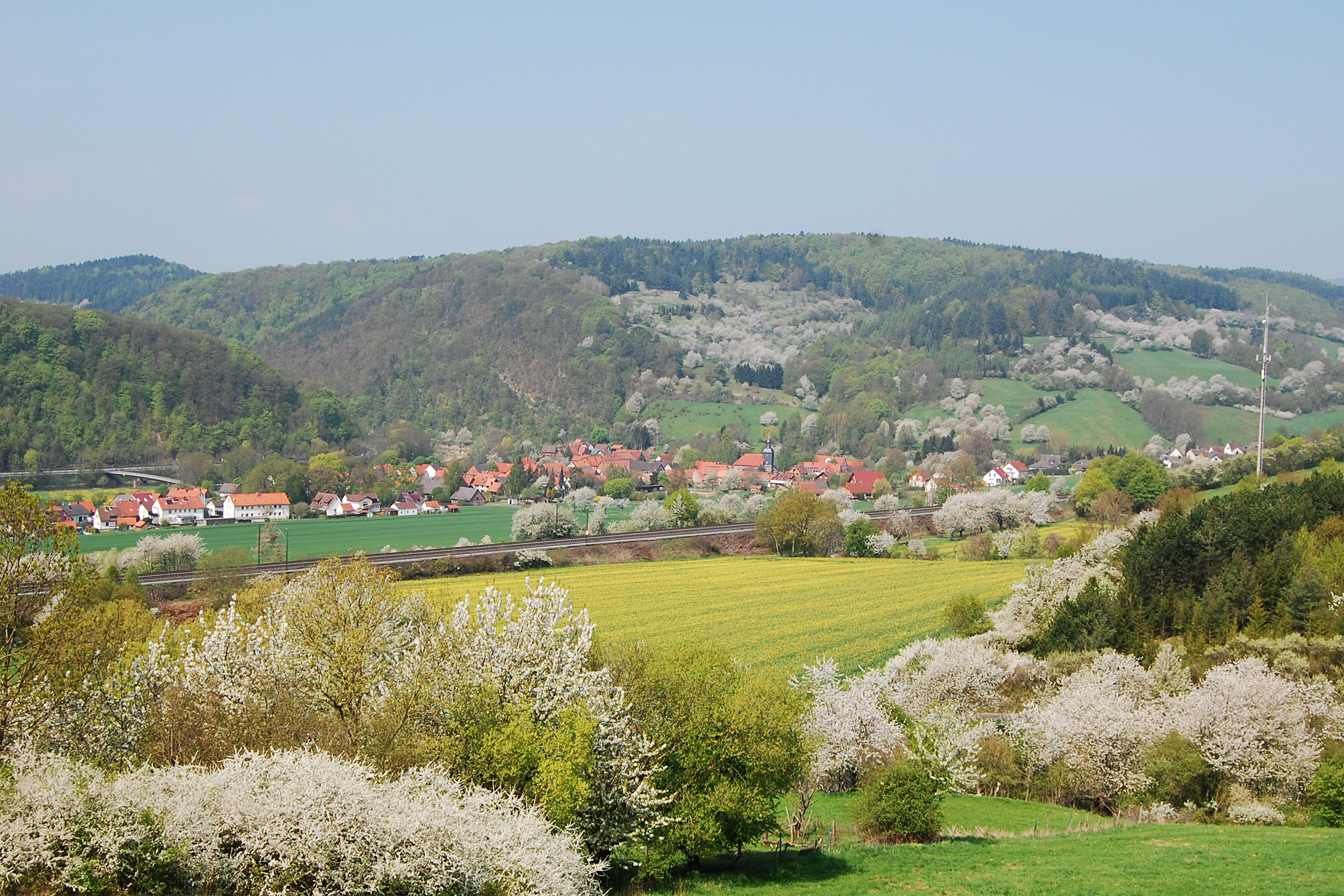
Blossom of cherry trees

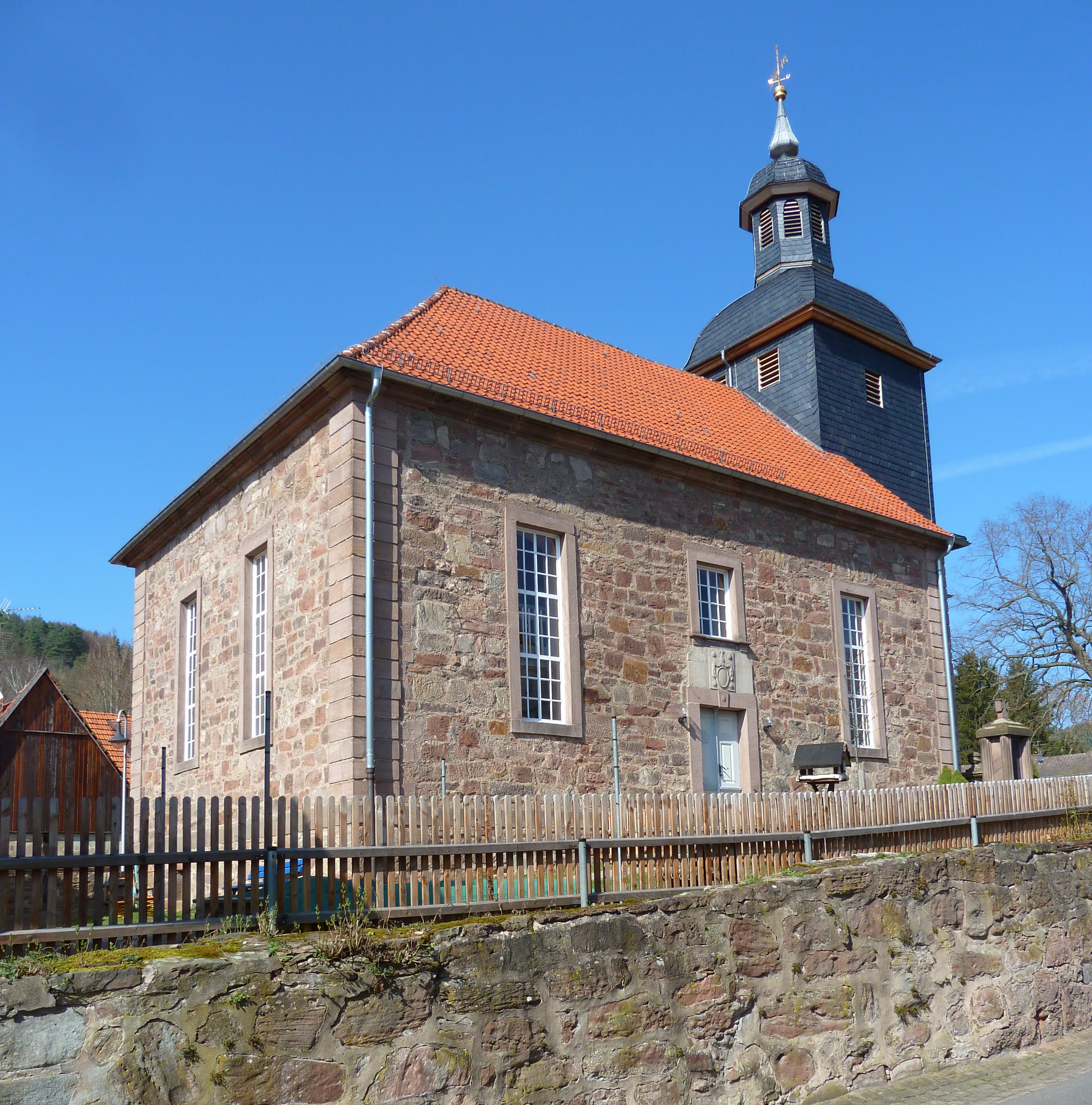
Church
