= Asbach-Sickenberg =

- Municipality
- Location of Asbach-Sickenberg within Eichsfeld district
- Interactive map of Asbach-Sickenberg
- Location within Germany Location within Thuringia
- Coordinates: 51°16′47″N 10°1′49″E
- Country: Germany
- State: Thuringia
- District: Eichsfeld

Government
  - Mayor (2019–25): Siegfried Dellemann

Area
  - Total: 9.91 km^{2} (3.83 sq mi)
- Elevation: 256 m (840 ft)

Population (2025-12-31)
  - Total: 98
  - Density: 9.9/km^{2} (26/sq mi)
- Time zone: UTC+01:00 (CET)
  - Summer (DST): UTC+02:00 (CEST)
- Postal codes: 37318
- Dialling codes: 036087
- Vehicle registration: EIC
- Website: lg-uder.de

Asbach-Sickenberg (German pronunciation: [ˈasbax ˈzɪkn̩bɛʁk]) is a municipality in the district of Eichsfeld, in Thuringia, Germany. As a result of the 1945 Wanfried agreement, formerly Hessian Asbach-Sickenberg became part of the Soviet occupation zone and the later German Democratic Republic.

== Population Development ==
Inhabitants as of (31. Dezember):

- 1994: 101
- 1995: 114
- 1996: 117
- 1997: 121
- 1998: 113
- 1999: 113
- 2000: 114
- 2001: 114
- 2002: 120
- 2003: 113
- 2004: 124
- 2005: 124
- 2006: 120
- 2007: 124
- 2008: 119
- 2009: 110
- 2010: 116
- 2011: 118
- 2012: 107
- 2013: 105
- 2014: 101
- 2015: 102
- 2016: 102
- 2017: 97
- 2018: 92
- 2019: 94
- 2020: 96
- 2021: 102
- 2022: 99

Data source: Thüringian Statistics Office
