= Mr. President discography =

Band discography

- Studio albums: 5
- Compilation albums: 3
- Singles: 19
- Music videos: 15

This is the discography for German Eurodance musical group Mr. President.

== Studio albums ==
| Title | Album details | Peak chart positions | | | | | | | Certifications |
| Title | Album details | GER | AUT | FIN | JPN | NL | SWE | SWI | Certifications |
|---|---|---|---|---|---|---|---|---|---|
| Up'n Away – The Album | Released: 1995; Label: Warner (Germany); Formats: CD, cassette, vinyl | 37 | — | 4 | — | — | — | 38 | IFPI FIN: Platinum |
| We See the Same Sun (Entitled Coco Jumbo in Japan) | Released: 17 May 1996; Label: Warner International; Formats: CD, cassette, vinyl | 16 | 15 | 1 | 10 | 80 | 56 | 9 | IFPI FIN: Platinum; IFPI SWI: Gold; RIAJ: Platinum |
| Night Club (Entitled Joe Joe Action in Japan) | Released: 27 August 1997; Label: Warner International; Formats: CD, cassette, vinyl | 10 | 15 | 10 | 17 | — | — | 11 | RIAJ: Gold |
| Space Gate | Released: 25 May 1999; Label: Warner (Germany); Formats: CD, cassette, vinyl | 5 | 22 | 32 | 48 | — | — | 11 | — |
| Forever & One Day | Released: 12 June 2003; Label: Epic Records; Formats: CD, cassette | — | — | — | — | — | — | — | — |
"—" denotes items that did not chart or were not released.

=== Compilation albums ===
| Title | Album details | Peak chart positions |
| Title | Album details | JPN |
|---|---|---|
| Mr. President (U.S. release only) | Released: 15 July 1997; Label: Warner Brothers; Formats: CD, cassette, vinyl | 94 |
| Happy People (Japan release only) | Released: 26 August 1998; Label: Warner Brothers (Japan); Formats: CD, cassette, vinyl | — |
| A Kind of...Best! | Released: 20 November 2000; Label: Warner International; Formats: CD, cassette | — |
"—" denotes items that did not chart or were not released.

== Singles ==
| Title | Year | Peak chart positions | | | | | | | | | | Certifications | Album |
| Title | Year | GER | AUS | AUT | FIN | FRA | NDL | SWE | SWI | UK | US | Certifications | Album |
|---|---|---|---|---|---|---|---|---|---|---|---|---|---|
| "MM" | 1993 | — | — | — | — | — | — | — | — | — | — | | Non-album single |
| "Up'n Away" | 1994 | 12 | — | 6 | 17 | — | — | 24 | 17 | 156 | — | BVMI: Gold | Up'n Away – The Album |
| "I'll Follow the Sun" | 1995 | 23 | — | 18 | 15 | — | — | — | 16 | — | — | | Up'n Away – The Album |
| "4 On the Floor" | 1995 | 38 | — | — | 20 | — | — | 36 | — | — | — | | Up'n Away – The Album |
| "Gonna Get Along (Without Ya Now)" | 1995 | 31 | — | — | — | — | — | — | — | — | — | | Up'n Away – The Album |
| "Coco Jamboo" | 1996 | 2 | 7 | 1 | 3 | 28 | 2 | 1 | 1 | 8 | 21 | BVMI: Platinum; ARIA: Platinum; BPI: Silver; GLF: Gold; IFPI AUT: Gold; IFPI SWI: Gold | We See the Same Sun |
| "I Give You My Heart" | 1996 | 7 | — | 12 | 9 | — | — | 47 | 6 | 52 | — | BVMI: Gold | We See the Same Sun |
| "Show Me the Way" | 1996 | 28 | — | 18 | 19 | — | — | 59 | 21 | — | — | | We See the Same Sun |
| "Coco Jamboo (Christmas Version)" | 1996 | — | — | — | 19 | — | — | — | — | — | — | | Up'n Away – The Special Album |
| "Gonna Get Along" [re-release] | 1996 | — | — | — | 13 | — | — | — | — | — | — | | Up'n Away – The Special Album |
| "Jojo Action" | 1997 | 4 | 78 | 3 | 8 | — | — | — | 5 | 73 | — | BVMI: Gold | Night Club |
| "Take Me to the Limit" | 1997 | 11 | — | 16 | 18 | — | — | — | 21 | — | — | | Night Club |
| "Where Do I Belong" (featuring Münchener Freiheit) | 1997 | 49 | — | 25 | — | — | — | — | — | — | — | | Night Club |
| "Happy People" | 1998 | 15 | — | 16 | — | — | — | — | 17 | — | — | | Night Club |
| "Give a Little Love" | 1999 | 13 | — | 8 | — | — | — | — | 18 | — | — | | Space Gate |
| "Simbaleo" | 1999 | 30 | — | 40 | — | — | — | — | 24 | — | — | | Space Gate |
| "Up'n Away 2K" | 2000 | — | — | — | — | — | — | — | — | — | — | | A Kind of... Best |
| "Love, Sex & Sunshine" | 2003 | 23 | — | 35 | — | — | — | — | — | — | — | | Forever & One Day |
| "Forever & One Day" | 2003 | 51 | — | 48 | — | — | — | — | — | — | — | | Forever & One Day |
| "Sweat (A La La La La Long)" | 2005 | — | — | — | — | — | — | — | — | — | — | | Non-album singles |
| "Megamix 2006" | 2006 | — | — | — | — | — | — | — | — | — | — | | Non-album singles |
"—" denotes items that did not chart or were not released.
