= Goldene Aue, Thuringia =

Coordinates: 51.450°N 10.883°E

Goldene Aue (German pronunciation: [ˈɡɔldənə ˈʔaʊə]) is a former Verwaltungsgemeinschaft ("collective municipality") in the district of Nordhausen, in Thuringia, Germany. The seat of the Verwaltungsgemeinschaft was in Heringen. It was disbanded on 1 December 2010.

The Verwaltungsgemeinschaft Goldene Aue consisted of the following municipalities:

1. Auleben
2. Görsbach
3. Hamma
4. Heringen
5. Urbach
6. Uthleben
7. Windehausen
