= Take Me to the Limit =

Single by Mr. President

from the album Night Club
- Released: August 1997
- Studio: Das Studio, Bremen
- Genre: Eurodance
- Length: 3:41
- Label: Warner Bros.
- Songwriters: Caren Miller; Robin Masters
- Producer: Kai Matthiesen

Mr. President singles chronology
"Jojo Action" (1997)	"Take Me to the Limit" (1997)	"Where Do I Belong" (1997)

Music video
- "Take Me to the Limit" on YouTube

"Take Me to the Limit" is a song by German Eurodance group Mr. President, released in August 1997, by Warner Bros. Records, as the second single from their third album, Night Club (1997). It is written by Caren Miller and Robin Masters and produced by Kai Matthiesen. The song was a notable hit in Europe, becoming a top-20 hit in Germany, Austria and Finland. On the Eurochart Hot 100, it reached number 44 in October 1997. The accompanying music video was directed by John Buche and filmed in a brothel in Austria. Buche had previously directed the videos for the group's previous hit-singles "Coco Jamboo", "I Give You My Heart" and "Show Me the Way".

== Track listing ==
- 12" single, Germany (1997)
1. "Take Me to the Limit" (Extended Version)
2. "Take Me to the Limit" (House Version Incl. Beatboys For Mix-DJ's)
3. "Take Me to the Limit" (House Version)
4. "Take Me to the Limit" (Album Version)
5. "Take Me to the Limit" (Radio Version)
6. "Take Me to the Limit" (Instrumental Version)
- CD maxi, Germany (1997)
1. "Take Me to the Limit" (Radio Version) — 3:41
2. "Take Me to the Limit" (Extended Version) — 6:19
3. "Take Me to the Limit" (House Version) — 5:22
4. "Take Me to the Limit" (House Version) (Incl. Beatboys For Mix-DJ's) — 6:16
5. "Take Me to the Limit" (Album Version) — 3:36
6. "Take Me to the Limit" (Instrumental Version) — 3:41

== Charts ==
Chart (1997)	Peak position
Austria (Ö3 Austria Top 40)	16
Europe (Eurochart Hot 100)	44
Finland (Suomen virallinen lista)	18
Germany (GfK)	11
Switzerland (Schweizer Hitparade)	21
