= Devang Patel =

AMusical artist

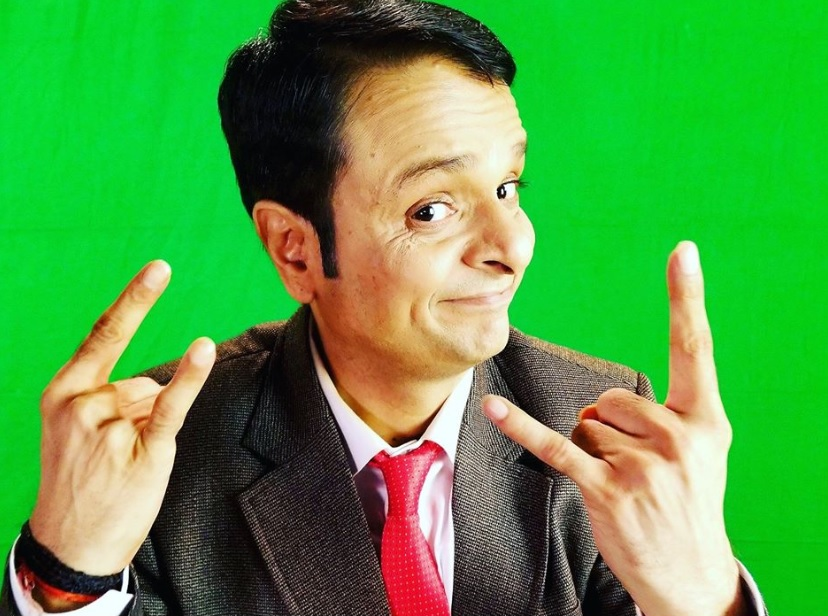
- Born: 1970 (age 54–55); Gujarat, India
- Occupations: Singer songwriter actor
- Years active: 1994–present
- Awards: Young Achievers Awards (2000); Gurjar Ratna awards (2008)
- Musical career
- Genres: Indipop
- Instrument: Vocals

Devang Patel (born 1970) is an Indian singer, actor, rapper, songwriter, dancer, film producer, film director and music performer.

== Career ==
Muratiyo No. 1 (2005) and Vanechandno Varghodo (2007), both starring Devang Patel, were big budget Gujarati films but had moderate success commercially. He came back to acting with Grand Hali (2017).

Devang Patel along with Singer Shuchita Vyas have dedicated a beautiful song to the walled city of Ahmedabad, entitled as Amdavad Heritage Garbo.

== Discography ==
Patel is known for his parodied songs in early 2000. Prior that, Patel also sang some songs for Bollywood and Gujarati films.

Buma Bum (Gujrati parody songs)

1. Aa Aaa Eee Ooo
2. Aa Dudh Thodi Shakkar
3. Bagdi Gaya Dada
4. Chashmish Mane Log Bole
5. Jaldi Jaldi Shodhine Aapjo
6. Mari Marjhi
7. Maru Shirt Fateli Mari Pent Fateli
8. Murkho Mane Kehta
9. Raate Chadar Odhine
10. Roj Chare Baju Chovis Kalak
11. Tari Budhi Nathi Sathe

=== Meri Marzi (1995) ===
1. "Meri Marzi" parody of It's My Life by Dr. Alban
2. "Ghar Kiyon Aaya Kayar" 'parody of Billy Joel - We Didn't Start The Fire'
3. "Machi Booma Boom"
4. "Flop Ten"

=== Patel Scope (2000) Times Music ===
1. "Aye Raju" parody of Alane by Wes Madiko
2. "Ladoo Kha" parody of Coco Jamboo by Mr. President
3. "Hathi Pajee" parody of Tic, Tic Tac by Chilli ft. Carrapicho
4. "Ghoom Ghoom" parody of Boom, Boom, Boom, Boom!! by Vengaboys
5. "Mauj hi Mauj"
6. "Kanwara Bechara"
7. "Bhai mere Bhai" parody of Chal Mere Bhai from Chal Mere Bhai
8. "Thoka" parody of Livin' la Vida Loca by Ricky Martin
9. "Hat ke Rehna" parody of Macarena
10. "Papa Ke Papa" parody of We Like to Party by Vengaboys
11. "Karna Nai" parody of Cotton-Eyed Joe by Dorothy Scarborough
12. "Mufat Mein Jo Mile" parody of The Cup of Life by Ricky Martin

=== Patel Scope II ===
1. "Bloody Fool"- Parody of "Daddy Cool" by Boney M.
2. "Aye Mere Seth"- Parody of "Ek Pal Ka Jeena" from Kaho Naa... Pyaar Hai
3. "Taal Pe Baal"- Parody of "Taal Se Taal" from Taal
4. "Chasma Chasma"- Parody of "Hamma" from Bombay
5. "Kuttha Kaata"- Parody of "Who Let the Dogs Out?" by Baha Men
6. "Don't Mind"- Parody of "Şımarık" by Tarkan and Kiss Kiss by Holly Valance
7. "Apun Bola"- Parody of the homonymous song from Josh
8. "Oh Oh Jaane Jaana"- Parody of the homonymous song from Pyar Kiya To Darna Kya
9. "Kya Bolti Tu"- Parody of the homonymous song from Ghulam
10. "Dus"- Parody of "They Don't Care About Us" by Michael Jackson
11. "Sehan Karna Nahi"- Parody of "Desert Rose" from Sting
12. "Ki Dhulai"- Parody "Stayin' Alive" from Bee Gees
13. "Chaddi"- Parody of "Yaad Piya Ki" by Falguni Pathak
14. "Made in India"- Parody of "Made in India" by Alisha Chinai
15. "Thu"- Parody of "Tu Hi Tu" by Sonu Nigam
16. "Bhaiya Bhaiya"- Parody of "Chaiyya Chaiyya" from Dil Se..
17. "Soch Le Bhai"- Parody of "Dil Le Gayee Kudi Gujarat Di" by Jasbir Jassi
18. "Ara Ra Ra"- Parody of "Bolo Tara Ra Ra" by Daler Mehandi

=== Patel Scope III ===
1. "Somwar Ko Sita" Parody of Ina Meena Dika by Kishore Kumar
2. "Main Adha Raha" Parody of Tu Tu Hai Wohi from Ek Haseena Thi, the starting music is based on the techno song Around the World (La La La La La)
3. "Hai Kamar Hoi Kamar" Parody of Whenever, Wherever by Shakira
4. "TV serial Jab Banta Hai" parody of Thoda Resham Lagta Hai by Meghna Naidu
5. "Bhajiya Garam" parody of Dum Maro Dum from Hare Rama Hare Krishna
6. "Susu-Susu" parody of Suku Suku by Shammi Kapoor
7. "Cat Mouse Dog" parody of Jailhouse Rock by Elvis Presley
8. "Chalte Chalte" parody of Chalte Chalte from Pakeezah
9. "Dil Chahta Hai" parody of Dil Chahta Hai from Dil Chahta Hai
10. "Monkey Monkey" parody of Money, Money, Money by ABBA
11. "De De Thappad De" parody of Hey Baby from No Doubt
12. "Main Hoon Mad" Parody of Bad by Michael Jackson
13. "Ho Jata Hai Scene" Parody of Rasputin by Boney M.
14. "Kambhakt Machhar" Parody of Kambakht Ishq from Pyaar Tune Kya Kiya
15. "Aish tu kar"

Grand Hali movie was released in 2017, where he worked as actor, director, music director, writer, singer, co producer. YOGANAA a single for Yoga. His latest single Bewafa tari Jafa is a huge current hit. Garba Albums: Sathvaaro Sath Sangath Saaheli Ghume Eno Garbo

== Films ==
=== Television ===
- Mahisagar (2014, cameo)

=== As actor ===
- Grand Hali (Gujarati, 2017)
- Smile Please (2004)
- Muratiyo No. 1 (Gujarati, 2005)
- Vanechandno Varghodo (Gujarati, 2007)
- Swaminarayan Serial as a Dada Khaachar (By Kalupur Swaminarayan Mandir)

=== Singer ===
- Grand Hali (2017)
- Smile Please (2004)
- Chaahat (1996)
- Gambler (1995)
- Mard (1998)
