= Helme (river) =

River in Germany

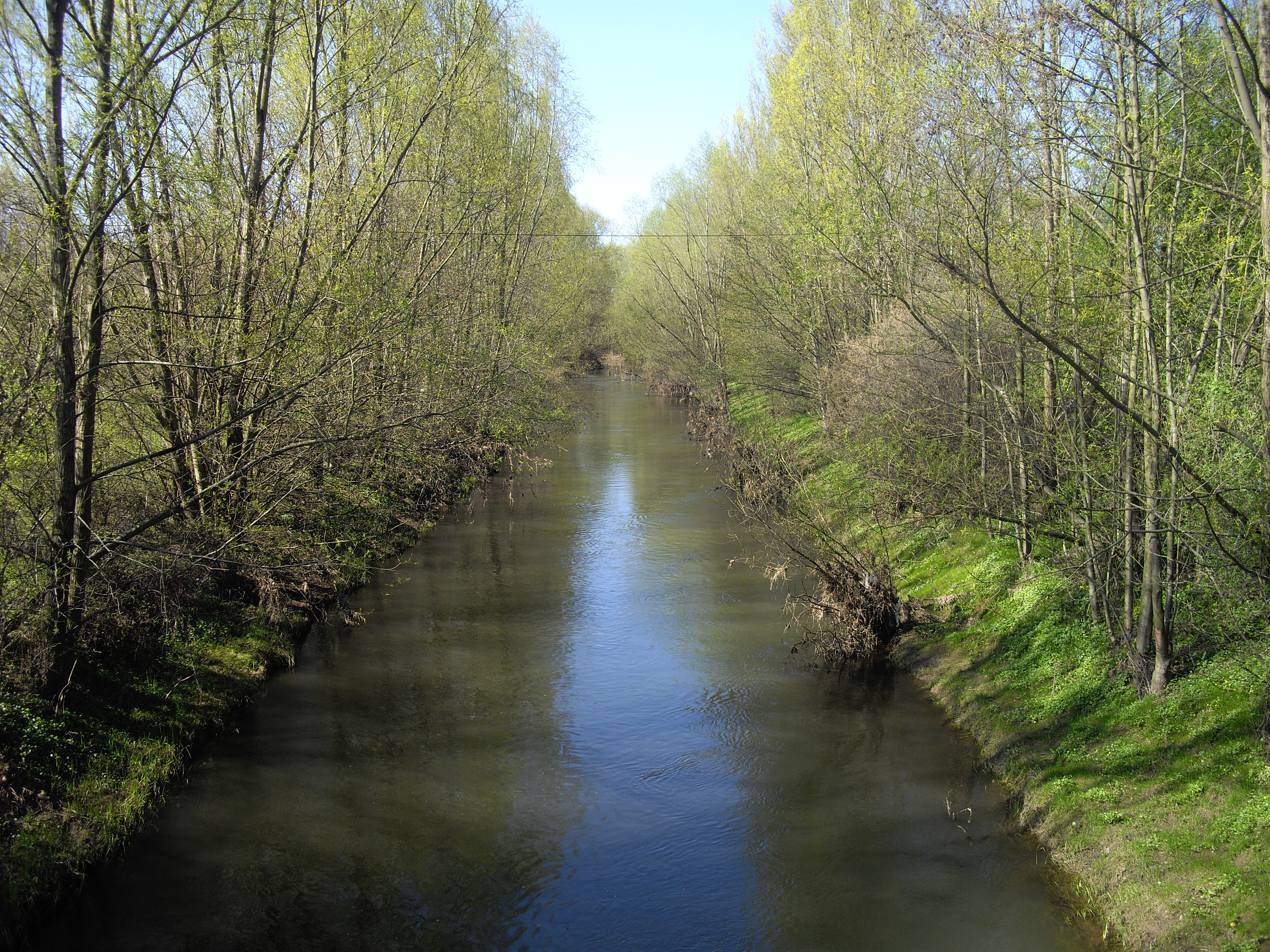

Location
- Country: Germany
- States: Thuringia and Saxony-Anhalt

Physical characteristics
- Source
  - location: Source region: Eichsfeld
- Mouth
  - location: Unstrut near Kalbsrieth
  - coordinates: 51°20′24″N 11°19′50″E
- Length: 65 km (40 mi)

Basin features
- Progression: Unstrut→ Saale→ Elbe→ North Sea
- Waterbodies: Reservoirs: Kelbra Reservoir
- Navigable: no

The Helme (German pronunciation: [ˈhɛlmə]) is a river in central Germany that is about 65 kilometres (40 mi) long and which forms a left-hand, western tributary of the Unstrut in the states of Thuringia and Saxony-Anhalt.

== Course ==
The river rises in Thuringia south of the Harz mountains in the district of Eichsfeld. Its source lies amongst the northern foothills of the Ohm Hills between Weißenborn-Lüderode and Stöckey by the Helmspring. The Helme flows eastwards through the municipalities of Hohenstein and Werther to Nordhausen. Near Heringen the river is joined by the waters of the Zorge from the Harz. Northwest of the Kyffhäuser hills it is impounded into a reservoir and a flood retention basin by the Kelbra Dam in the Goldene Aue. From there the Helme – now in the state of Saxony-Anhalt – continues eastwards flowing through Roßla towards Allstedt, where it then swings south and enters Thuringia again. Near Kalbsrieth, southeast of Artern, it discharges into the Unstrut.

== Helme watershed ==
The Helme watershed (German river index: 5648) together with the Kleine Helme (German river index: 5647.6) has a catchment of approximately 1,364 km^{2}, whereby the watershed determination was recorded using the following topographical data: QGIS 3.4 with OSM Topo Map in the date WGS84, pseudo mercator (https://opentopomap.org). Wikipedia only mentions 1318.1 km^{2} for the Helme watershed. It is located in central Germany between the southern slopes of Harz and northern slopes of the Kyffhäuser hills on the lowlands of the Goldene Aue. The main flow is from west-north-west to east-south-east, the northernmost section is part of the Unstrut watershed (German river index 564), which in turn is part of the Saale (German River Index 56) and this in turn is part of the Elbe (German River index 5) watershed. The catchment of the Helme encompasses the entire southern Harz region in the north and the Goldene Aue in the middle; while the southern part is fed from a number of smaller hill ranges: in the southwest there are the northern slopes of the hill region south of the towns of Epschenrode - Trebra - Bliedungen - Fronderode, a little further east are the north and east slopes of the Butterberg southwest of Großwerther. The central south of the watershed is formed by the north slope of the Windleite, the Numburg and Kyffhäuser hills. The south-south-east encompasses the north and east slopes of the Hutberg and Weinberg near Artern. The western limit of the Helme catchment area forms the main Elbe-Weser watershed: in the Harz between the Stöberhai mountain and the village of Osterhagen, then through the village of Osterhagen, the Mackenröde Forest and eastern crests of the Silkerode hill country west of Limlingerode, Stöckey and Epschenrode. The far east of the Helme catchment area is formed by the southwest slope of the Hornburg Saddle and heights northeast of the village of Bornstedt (near Eisleben) and Sittichenbach and the north and west slopes of the Ziegelroda Forest. The villages of Osterhagen (in the northwest) and Blankenheim (Mansfeld-Südharz district) (in the northeast) lie directly on the watershed. The easternmost point is between Rothenschirmbach (inside) and Hornburg (already outside the catchment area), both south of Eisleben. The most important towns are the two county towns of Nordhausen and Sangerhausen, the former county town of Artern, the small towns of Bad Sachsa, Ellrich, Heringen/Helme, Kelbra (Kyffhaeuser), Stolberg (Harz) and Allstedt, greater villages like Steina, Walkenried, Ilfeld, Neustadt/Harz, Uthleben, Auleben, Rottleberode, Rossla, Tilleda, Wallhausen (Helme) and Kalbsrieth, and numerous smaller villages. Actually is divided and same time forms the outskirt of the German federal States of Niedersachsen (upper watershed), Thüringen (middle and extreme lower part), and Sachsen-Anhalt (lower part). Most of the local population speak the northern Thuringian dialect.

=== Current issues with the Helme watershed ===
(1) Political fragmentation of 3 states, any of them are managing their own natural resources, which means
(2) Impossibility of an sound multidisciplinary integrated Watershed management and so a harmonious regional development; that means
(3) powerful soil erosion and accelerate degradation of once fertile agricultural land,
(4) silting and contamination of very important lakes and multiuse dams, shortening their live span,
(5) Brain-drain, emigration of well educated creative young people, because of high unemployment levels, because is outskirt of places where decisions are made (in the 3 "far away" federal states), because of the creation of artificial superfluous borders between federal states that nobody wants.

== See also ==
- List of rivers of Saxony-Anhalt
- List of rivers of Thuringia
