= Steina (disambiguation) =

Steina is a municipality in Saxony, Germany.

Steina may also refer to:

- Steina (Schwalm), a river of Hesse, Germany, tributary of the Schwalm
- Steina (Wutach), a river of Baden-Württemberg, Germany, tributary of the Wutach
- Steina Dam, in the Harz Mountains of central Germany
- Steinaer Bach, other name Steina, the upper course of the Ichte, Lower Saxony, Germany
- Steina (Bad Sachsa), a district of Bad Sachsa, Lower Saxony, Germany
- Steina, district of the town Hartha, Saxony, Germany
- Steina, district of the municipality Fischbachtal, Hesse, Germany
- 707 Steina, a minor planet
- Steina Vasulka, Icelandic artist
