= Steina Dam =

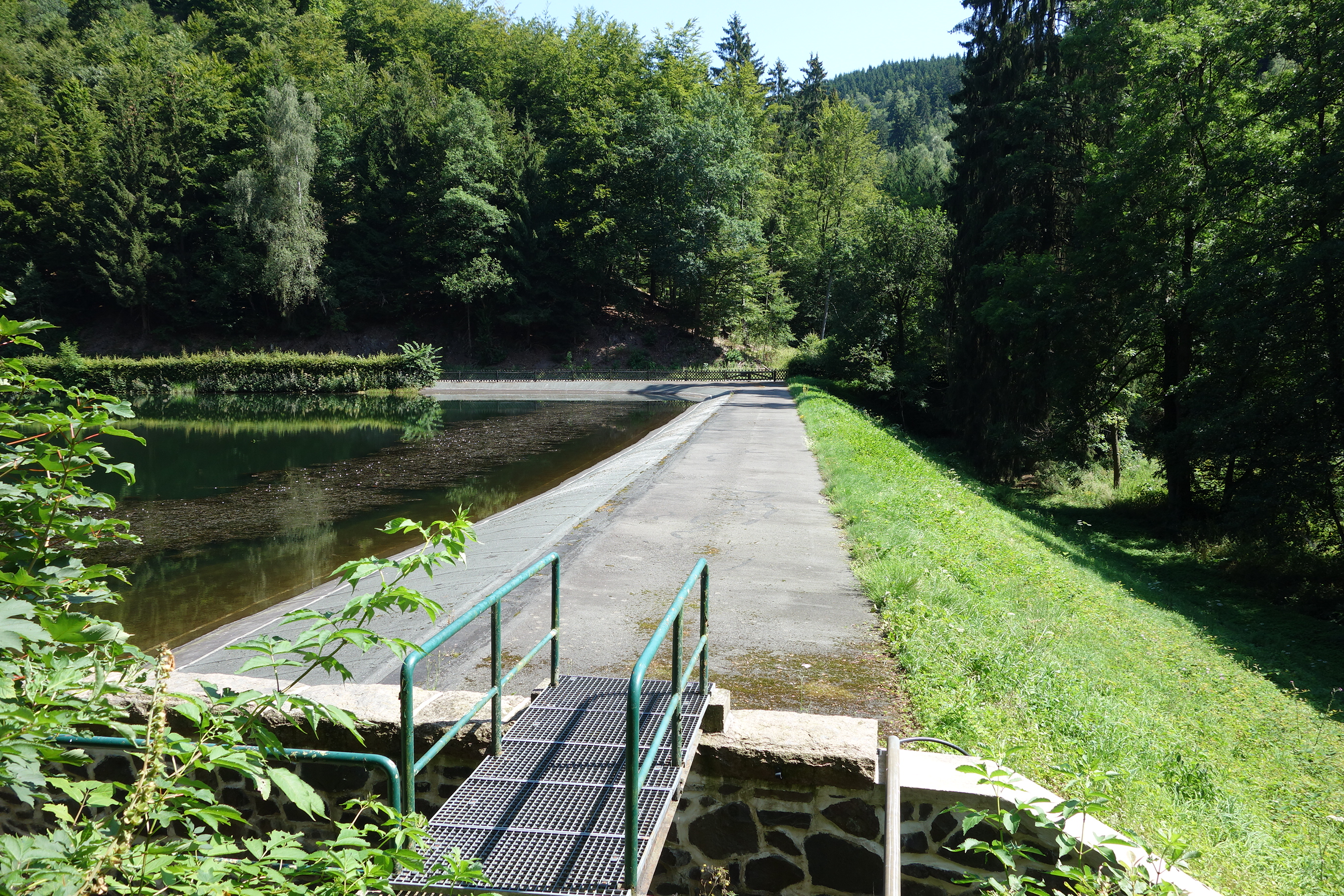
- Interactive map of Steina Dam
- Location: Near Bad Sachsa, Lower Saxony, Germany
- Coordinates: 51°36′42.5″N 10°30′23″E
- Construction began: 1950–1954, 1958

Dam and spillways
- Type of dam: earth-fill dam
- Impounds: Steina (Ichte tributary)
- Height (foundation): ca. 8.5 m (28 ft)
- Height (thalweg): ca. 8 m (26 ft)
- Length: ca. 80 m (260 ft)
- Elevation at crest: ca. 377.5 m above sea level (NN)
- Width (crest): 4 m (13 ft)
- Width (base): 40 m (130 ft)
- Dam volume: ca. 15,000 m^{3} (530,000 cu ft)

Reservoir
- Total capacity: ca. 75,000 m^{3} (2,600,000 cu ft) (ca. 75 Mio. L)
- Active capacity: ca. 70,000 m^{3} (2,500,000 cu ft) (ca. 70 Mio. L)
- Maximum length: ca. 300 m (980 ft)
- Maximum width: ca. 60 m (200 ft)
- Normal elevation: 375 m above sea level (NN)

The Steina Dam (German: Steinatalsperre) in the Harz Mountains of central Germany is a dam system comprising a dam, reservoir and waterworks near the village of Steina and belongs to the unincorporated area of Harz in the district of Göttingen in Lower Saxony.

The dam was inaugurated on 19 November 1954 as a retention basin and has been a drinking water reservoir since 1958. Its 8.5 metre high dam impounds the Steina stream forming the Steina Reservoir (Steinastaubecken). It provides drinking water for the villages of Bad Sachsa, Osterhagen, Nüxei and Steina, which is why the surrounding woods are a water protection area.

== Location ==
The Steina Dam lies in the Upper Harz within the Harz Nature Park. It stretches for about 2.2 km north-northwest of Steina, a village in the borough of Bad Sachsa on the Ichte tributary, the Steinaer Bach (also called the Steina) – in the Steina Valley (Steinatal) – and is part of the catchment area of the River Elbe. To the northeast rises the western spur of the Nesselkopf (581.6 m above NN), the Nesseltalskopf (ca. 580 m above NN), to the southeast is the south-southwestern spur of the Nesselkopf, the Steintalskopf (ca. 480 m above NN). To the west is the Hüttenberg (509 m above NN).

== Dam ==
The earth-fill dam was built between 1950 and 1954. It is 8 metres high above the valley floor and 8.5 m above the foot of the dam. The crest of the dam is at an elevation of about 377.5 m above NN, it is around 80 metres long, 4 metres wide at the top and about 40 metres wide at the base. The dam has a volume of circa 15,000 m³ of earth-fill.

== Waterworks ==
About 550 metres below the dam, next to the forest hotel Im Steinatal is the waterworks, which opened in 1958. It provides drinking water for Bad Sachsa, Osterhagen, Nüxei and Steina.

== Reservoir ==
The Steina Reservoir is oriented in a north-northwest to south-southeast direction, is about 300 metres long and a maximum of around 60 metres wide.. It has a storage volume of circa 70,000 m³ (70 M L) and a total retaining capacity of 75,000 m³ (75 M L). Its top water level lies at about 375 m above sea level (NN)

== Access and hiking ==
The Steina Dam may be reached from Steina on the Steinatalstraße. From the Steinatal car park by the Waldhotel im Steinatal at the end of this cul de sac it is about 550 metres on foot to the dam. From here, there are walks to Bad Sachsa, Bad Lauterberg and the Ravensberg.

The Steina Dam used to be no. 43 in the system of checkpoints in the Harzer Wandernadel hiking network. The checkpoint was located at the mouth of the Nesseltal valley in the Steinatal, a few metres southeast and below the dam at a small resting area (ca. 375 m above sea level (NN); 51°36′40.75″N 10°30′27.3″E).

== See also ==
- Dams in the Harz
- List of dams in Germany
