= Kelbra Dam =

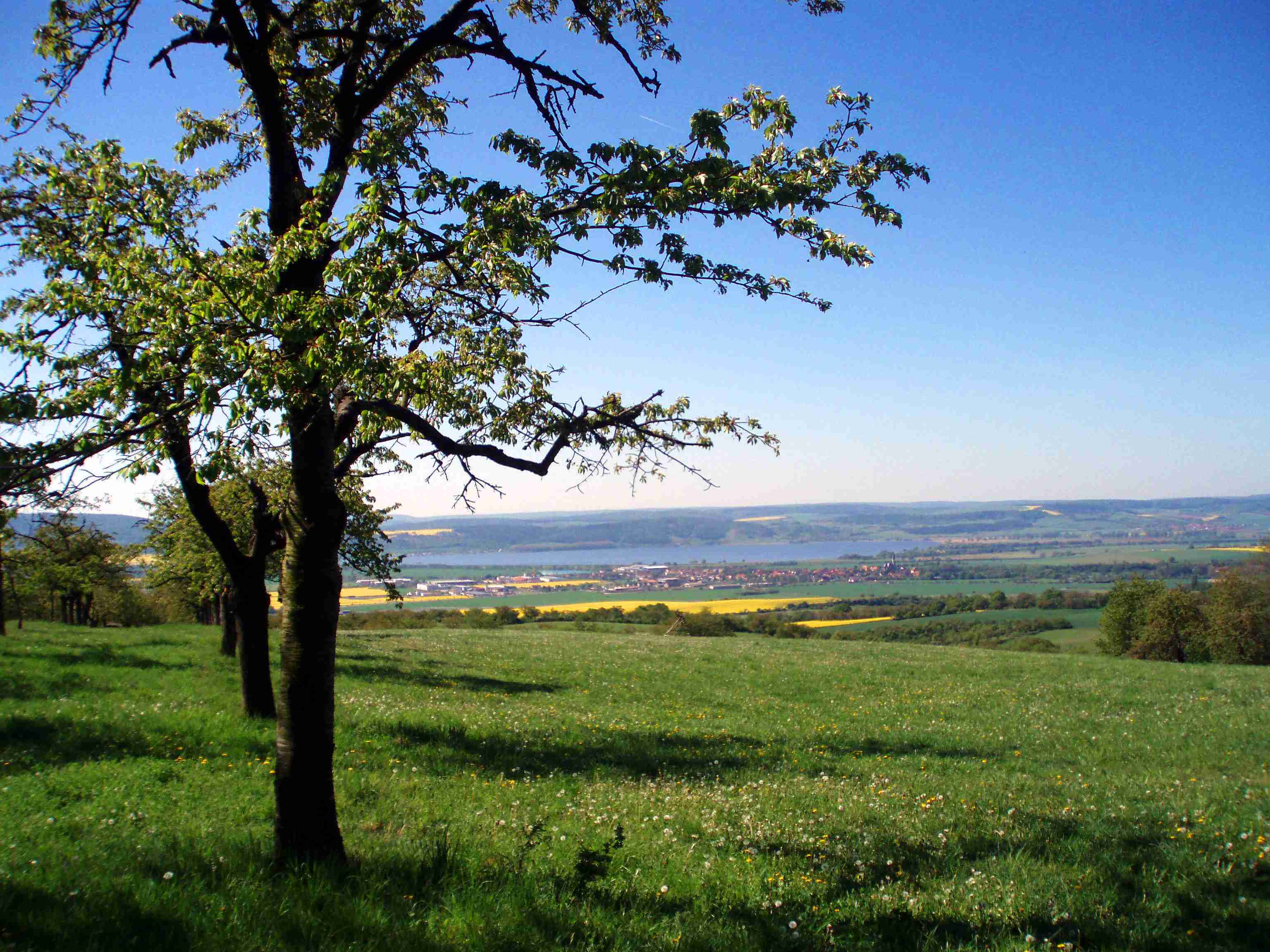
- The Kelbra Reservoir.

- Location within Germany
- Official name: Talsperre Kelbra
- Country: Germany
- Location: Saxony-Anhalt
- Coordinates: 51°26′08″N 10°59′37″E
- Construction began: 1962
- Opening date: 1966

Dam and spillways
- Type of dam: Embankment dam
- Impounds: Helme
- Height: 12.7 m (42 ft)
- Length: 4,066 m (13,340 ft)
- Width (crest): 5 m (16 ft)
- Dam volume: 860,000 m^{3} (30,000,000 ft^{3})
- Spillway capacity: 277 m^{3}/s (9,782 cu ft/s)

Reservoir
- Creates: Kelbra Reservoir
- Total capacity: 35,600,000 m^{3} (28,900 acre⋅ft)
- Catchment area: 677.4 km^{2} (262 sq mi)
- Surface area: 600 ha (6 km^{2})

The Kelbra Dam (German: Talsperre Kelbra) is a dam on the River Helme in the German state of Saxony-Anhalt. Behind the dam is the lake known as the Kelbra Reservoir (Stausee Kelbra) or Kelbra Flood Retention Basin (Hochwasserrückhaltebecken Kelbra).

== Purpose ==
The dam was built to provide flood protection and its reservoir collects the waters of the Harz flowing into the southern Harz Foreland via the River Helme and its tributaries. The reservoir lake stores water for irrigation and is used for angling and recreation. Both dam and lake are operated jointly and cooperatively by the Thuringian Long Distance Water Supply (Thüringer Fernwasserversorgung) and the Saxony-Anhalt Dam Company (Talsperrenbetrieb von Sachsen-Anhalt).

== Dam ==
The Kelbra Dam was built from 1962 to 1966 between Berga and Kelbra in the region known as the Goldene Aue between Nordhausen in the west and Sangerhausen in the east. It is located in the district of Mansfeld-Südharz (Saxony-Anhalt) on the northwestern end of the Kyffhäuser hills. It is only a few kilometres from the border with the state of Thuringia and impounds the river system of the Helme into the Kelbra Reservoir.

Its main and auxiliary barriers are earth-fill dams made of gravel and binding material (Erdstoffen). Both have a sloping internal grout curtain of clay on the water side.

The crest of the main dam is 4,066 m long and 7 m above the valley floor; the acute-angled auxiliary dam is 3,379 m long.

On the southern shore of the lake is the Numburg Cave.

== Reservoir ==
The Kelbra Reservoir lies on the river Helme behind the Kelbra Dam at the northwestern foot of the Kyffhäuser hills. It is located within the Goldene Aue, mainly in the district of Mansfeld-Südharz (Saxony-Anhalt); only a small area in its extreme southwestern sector, which is on the border of the Kyffhäuserkreis and Nordhausen districts, lies in Thuringia, which touches its southwestern shore.

Initially only a green - i.e. normally dry - flood retention basin was planned. In the event, however, a full dam was built in order to create a permanent reservoir, and an auxiliary dam, in order to provide a basin that absorbed the bulk of the Helme river system in the event of high water. As a result, there are two adjacent basins, the lower one being permanently impounded – i.e. as a permanent lake – a gauge on the lake indicating a height of 155.25 m above NN, a storage volume of 12.3 million m³ and a surface area of about 600 ha. The upper basin, which is bordered on its western and northwestern shores by arable and pasture land, is only impounded during times of high water. Together, both basins have a volume of 35.6 million m³, of which 23 million m³ is exclusive flood control capacity.

Following the completion of the trial impounding of the Kelbra Reservoir, which lasted until 1969, it was officially taken into service.

The lake is used extensively for tourist purposes and has facilities for sailing and windsurfing, a beach for swimming, a campsite, boat and bicycle hire, a petting zoo a waterslide and, near the lake, various inns and other facilities.

== Internationally important bird habitat ==
The reservoir is of international importance as a result of the variety of birds found on and around its waters, which, in terms of species as well as sheer numbers exceeds those settling on comparable stretches of water. For example, the following birds can regularly be observed here: duck (e.g. mallard, teal, pochard), waders (peewit, snipe, redshank, curlew), divers (great crested grebe, little grebe, black-necked grebe), rails (water rail, coot), mute swan, black-headed gull and bittern (little bittern and Eurasian bittern). In addition white-tailed eagle, osprey, peregrine and cormorant may also be spotted here. The variety of birds occurring during migration is particularly impressive. Up to 10,000 crane stop over on the reservoir and large flocks of larks and finches may be seen passing through. Since 1978 the reservoirs has been placed under the protection of the Ramsar Convention as an internationally important retreat for birds.

== See also ==
- List of dams in the Harz
- List of reservoirs and dams in Germany

== Sources ==
- Talsperren in Thüringen. Thüringer Talsperrenverwaltung, Autorenkollegium, 1993
