= Hellegrundbach =

River in Germany

Location
- Country: Germany
- State: Lower Saxony

Physical characteristics
- Source
  - location: Northwest of Nüxei (a district of Bad Sachsa)
  - coordinates: 51.5692°N 10.5009°E
- Mouth
  - location: Southwest of Nüxei into the Ichte
  - coordinates: 51.5589°N 10.5214°E

Basin features
- Progression: Ichte→ Helme→ Unstrut→ Saale→ Elbe→ North Sea

Hellegrundbach is a river of Lower Saxony, Germany.

The Hellegrundbach springs northwest of Nüxei, a district of Bad Sachsa. Southwest of Nüxei, it discharges into the Ichte (upstream of this confluence called Steinacher Bach).

== See also ==
- List of rivers of Lower Saxony
