= Ichte =

River in Germany

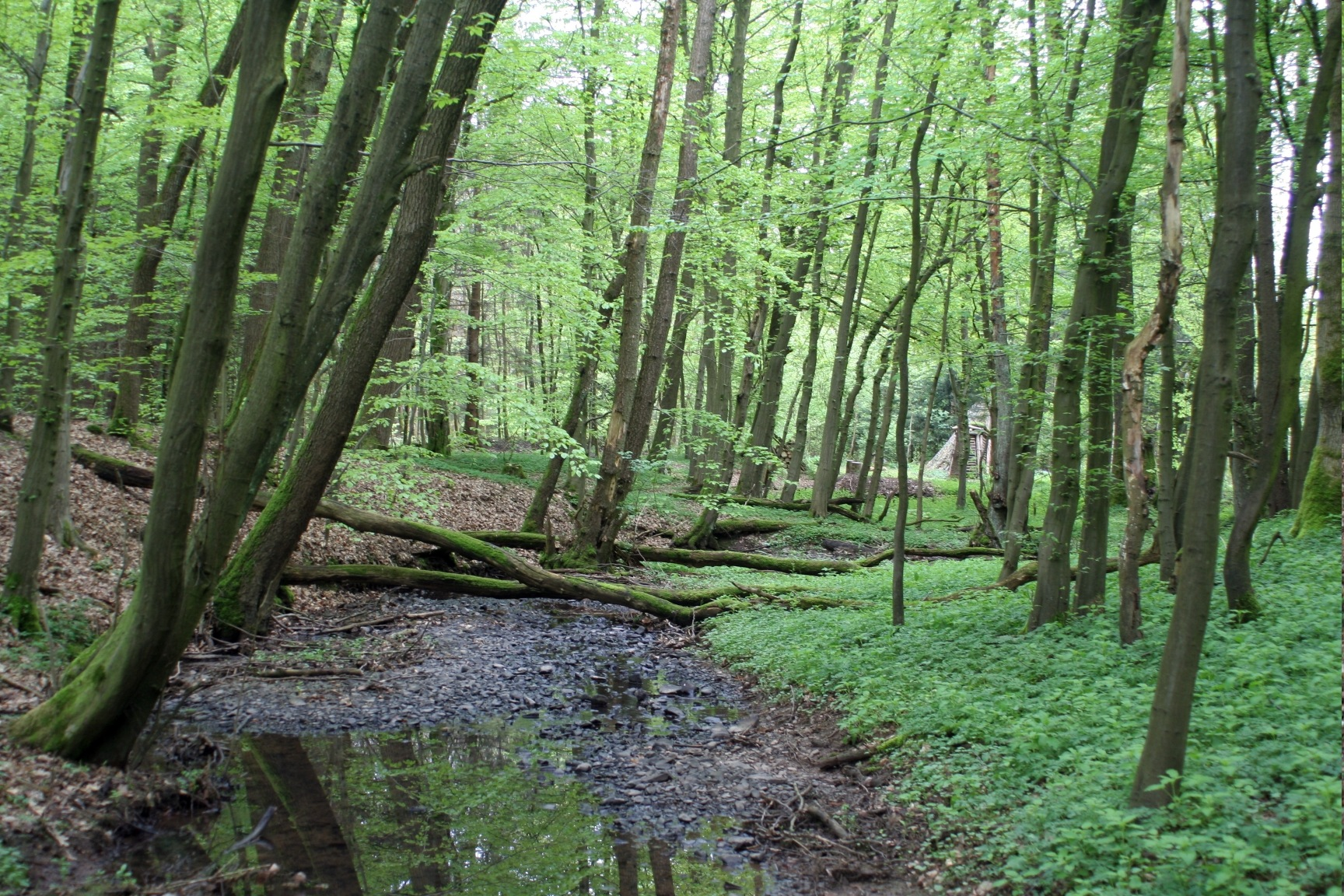

Location
- Country: Germany
- States: Thuringia and Lower Saxony

Physical characteristics
- Source
  - location: East of the Oder Dam
  - coordinates: 51.6552°N 10.5453°E
- Mouth
  - location: northeast of Pützlingen, a district of Werther, into the Helme
  - coordinates: 51.5243°N 10.6295°E

Basin features
- Progression: Helme→ Unstrut→ Saale→ Elbe→ North Sea

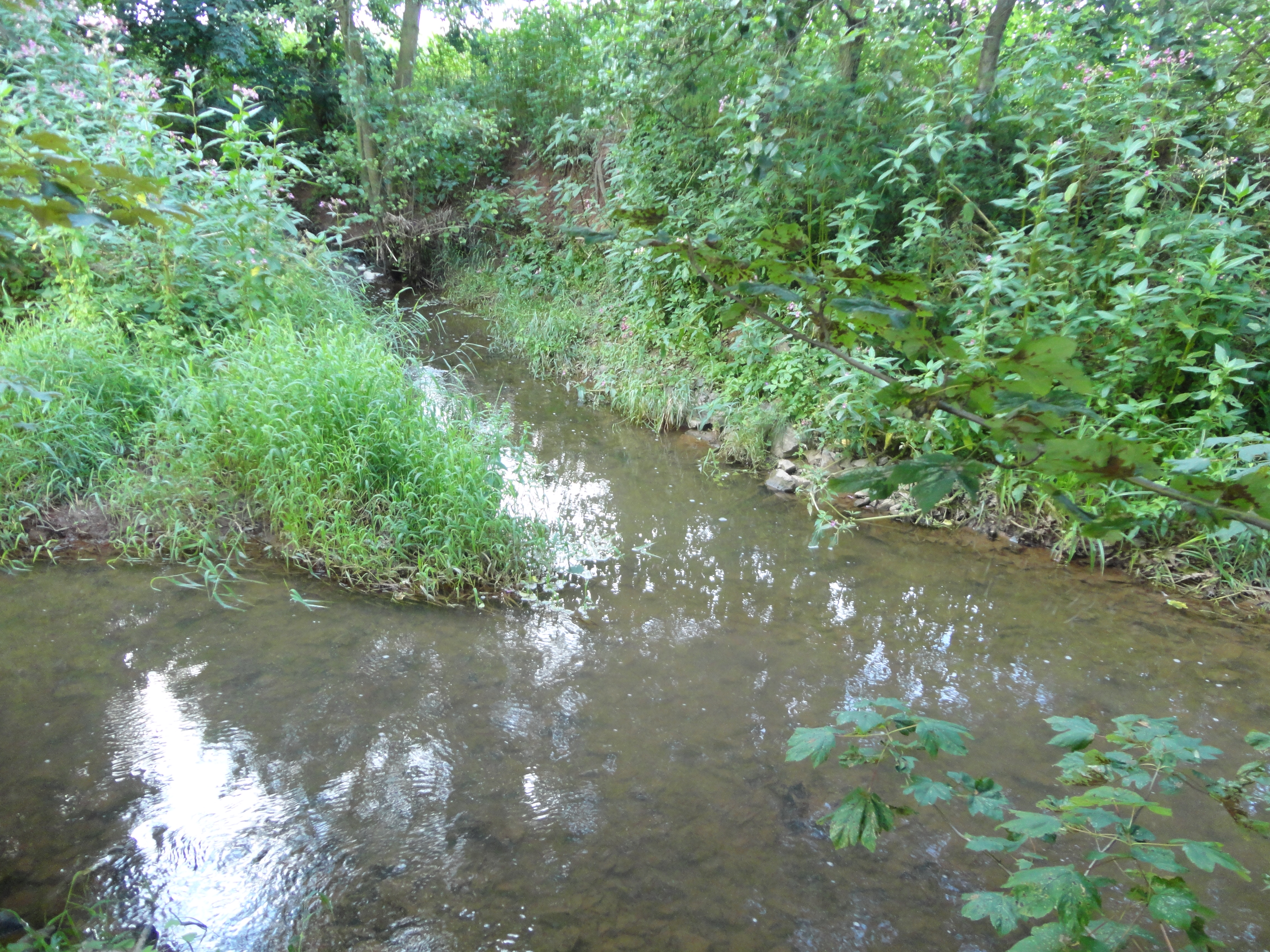
The Ichte discharges (from top) into the Helme

Ichte, in its upper course also called Steinaer Bach, is a river of Thuringia and Lower Saxony, Germany.

The Ichte springs east of the Oder Dam as Steinaer Bach in Lower Saxony. After the confluence of the Hellegrundbach, the river is called Ichte. The Ichte then crosses the boundary between Lower Saxony and Thuringia. It finally discharges northeast of Pützlingen, a district of Werther, from the left into the Helme.

== See also ==
- List of rivers of Thuringia
- List of rivers of Lower Saxony
