= Windehausen =

- Ortsteil of Heringen
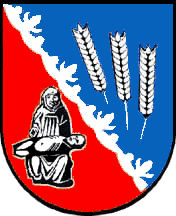
- Coat of arms
- Interactive map of Windehausen
- Location within Germany Location within Thuringia
- Coordinates: 51°28′N 10°52′E
- Country: Germany
- State: Thuringia
- District: Nordhausen
- Town: Heringen

Area
  - Total: 5.93 km^{2} (2.29 sq mi)
- Elevation: 161 m (528 ft)

Population (2009-12-31)
  - Total: 531
  - Density: 89.5/km^{2} (232/sq mi)
- Time zone: UTC+01:00 (CET)
  - Summer (DST): UTC+02:00 (CEST)
- Postal codes: 99765
- Dialling codes: 036333

Windehausen is a village and a former municipality in the Nordhausen district, in Thuringia, Germany. Since 1 December 2010, it is part of the town Heringen.
