= Weingartenloch =

Cave in Germany

Weingartenloch is a cave located near the German town of Osterhagen. In the past, the cave was supposed to harbor treasures and these rumors lead to several deadly accidents in the cave. In fact, the cave is just a geological monument.

== History ==
Weigartenloch is mentioned in legend and folk legends in Germany. One retold by M.E.T. Lauder has inhabitants of the town of Osterhagen tricking a poor man into going with them to the cave in exchange for money to feed his eight children.
