= Jojo Action =

1997 single by Mr. President

Single by Mr. President

from the album Night Club
- Released: 9 June 1997
- Studio: Das Studio (Bremen, Germany)
- Genre: Eurodance; dance-pop; house
- Length: 3:50
- Label: Club Culture; WEA
- Songwriters: Delroy Rennalls; Robin Masters
- Producer: Kai Matthiesen

Mr. President singles chronology
"Show Me the Way" (1996)	"Jojo Action" (1997)	"Take Me to the Limit" (1997)

Audio
- "Jojo Action" on YouTube

"Jojo Action" is a song by German Eurodance group Mr. President, released on 9 June 1997 as the first single from their third album, Night Club (1997). The song is written by group member Delroy Rennalls and Robin Masters, and produced by Kai Matthiesen. It was a European hit, peaking at number one in Hungary, number three in Austria, number four in Germany, number five in Switzerland and number eight in Finland. In the UK, it reached number 73. Outside Europe, the song became a hit in Mexico, while in Australia, it only peaked at number 78. It was certified gold in Germany, with a sale of 250,000 units. The accompanying music was shot in Miami, the US, featuring the group performing in a night club and on the beach.

== Critical reception ==
Pan-European magazine Music & Media wrote, "This band is enjoying singles success with different titles in various parts of Europe. Last year's continental smash, 'Coco Jamboo', is now performing quite nicely in the U.K. This song, which is at least as infectious as its predecessor, is helping establish the band as a permanent feature on the Eurochart, and entered the German singles listing at number six."

Head of music at Frankfurt-based commercial CHR network Radio FFH, covering the whole of the state of Hessen, Ralph Blasberg considered the song a 'must play'. He said, "This song is the type of pop/dance crossover material that our core audience loves and therefore it fits our format perfectly. We conduct a lot of listener research; we found that this song with its feelgood, summery flavour is just perfect for us. The fact it entered our singles chart straight at position six seems to confirm our research." Gerald Martinez from New Straits Times felt the song "delivers a spicy taste. It swings in a colourful kaleidoscope of house, Latin American rhythms and pop grooves. Very hooky."

== Track listings ==
- CD single, Germany (1997)
1. "Jojo Action" (radio edit) — 3:50
2. "Jojo Action" (extended version) — 5:55
- Maxi-CD single, Germany (1997)
1. "Jojo Action" (radio edit) — 3:50
2. "Jojo Action" (extended version) — 5:55
3. "Jojo Action" (house version) — 5:07
4. "Jojo Action "(Kraftwerk mix) — 6:38
5. "Jojo Action" (Jazzy Funky Style) — 3:55
6. "Jojo Action" (Put It on Another version) — 3:39
7. "Jojo Action" (instrumental) — 3:51
- 12-inch vinyl, Germany (1997)
1. "Jojo Action" (extended version) — 5:55
2. "Jojo Action" (house version) — 5:07
3. "Jojo Action" (instrumental) — 3:51
4. "Jojo Action" (radio edit) — 3:50
5. "Jojo Action" (Kraftwerk mix) — 6:38
6. "Jojo Action" (Jazzy Funky Style) — 3:55
7. "Jojo Action" (Put It on Another version) — 3:39
- 12-inch maxi-single, Europe (1998)
1. "Jojo Action" (Candy Girls club mix) — 6:48
2. "Jojo Action" (radio edit) — 3:48
3. "Jojo Action" (Mondo's "Bosomania" 12-inch Pumper) — 7:08
4. "Jojo Action" (Blown Up mix) — 5:15

== Charts ==
=== Weekly charts ===
Chart (1997–1998)	Peak position
Australia (ARIA)	78
Austria (Ö3 Austria Top 40)	3
Denmark (IFPI)	9
Estonia (Eesti Top 20)	19
Europe (Eurochart Hot 100)	8
Finland (Suomen virallinen lista)	8
Germany (GfK)	4
Hungary (Mahasz)	1
Mexico (Notitas Musicales)	5
Norway (VG-lista)	20
Scottish Singles Sales (Official Charts)	41
Switzerland (Schweizer Hitparade)	5
UK Singles (Official Charts)	73

=== Year-end charts ===
Chart (1997)	Position
Austria (Ö3 Austria Top 40)	20
Germany (Media Control)	35
Romania (Romanian Top 100)	48
Switzerland (Schweizer Hitparade)	32

== Certifications ==
Region	Certification	Certified units/sales
Germany (BVMI)	Gold	250,000^{^}
^{^} Shipments figures based on certification alone.

== Release history ==
Region	Date	Format(s)	Label(s)	Ref.
Germany	9 June 1997	CD	Club Culture; WEA	
Japan	25 August 1997	CD	WEA	
United Kingdom	13 April 1998	12-inch vinyl; CD; cassette	WEA	
