= The Gambler (1995 film) =

Gambler
- Movie poster for Gambler
- Directed by: Dayal Nihalani
- Written by: Anwar Khan (dialogue). Dayal Nihalani (screenplay & story)
- Produced by: Dhirajlal Shah
- Starring: Govinda (actor); Shilpa Shetty; Aditya Pancholi; Gulshan Grover; Raj Babbar; Saeed Jaffrey; Mohan Joshi; Johnny Lever; Tinnu Anand; Rohini Hattangadi; Sudhir Dalvi
- Cinematography: Najeeb Khan
- Edited by: D.N. Malik
- Music by: Anu Malik
- Distributed by: Venus Records & Tapes
- Release date: 8 December 1995
- Country: India
- Language: Hindi
- Budget: ₹5.50 crore
- Box office: ₹12.02 crore

Gambler is a 1995 Indian Hindi-language action thriller film directed by Dayal Nihalani, which is a remake of the Malayalam film Aanaval Mothiram (1991).

== Plot ==
Dayashankar Pandey is a clumsy, low-level police inspector in Mumbai who has mastered the art of doing absolutely nothing. He lives a modest life with his mother and his sister, Sunita. His entire professional existence is a joke; he spends his time sleeping at his desk, taking small "donations" from street vendors, and inventing dramatic chest pains to avoid any assignment that might involve a physical confrontation. His superior, Commissioner Khurana, views him as a hopeless coward. Dayashankar’s only real stressor is his sister’s marriage, which he cannot afford, but even that isn't enough to make him risk his skin.

The story shifts gears when Dayashankar visits a hospital for a routine check-up to maintain his "sick" persona for department records. A distracted lab assistant swaps his file with a patient who has a terminal heart condition. The doctor breaks the news to Dayashankar: he has a massive, incurable hole in his heart and only ninety days to live. Initially, he is paralyzed by the thought of his own mortality, but he soon has a financial epiphany. He learns that if an officer dies of natural causes, the family receives very little. However, if an officer is killed in a "gallantry act" or while fighting criminals, the government pays out a massive lump sum of insurance money and a full monthly pension to the survivors.

Driven by a desperate love for his family, Dayashankar decides he must be murdered in the line of duty. He begins a "suicide mission" phase where he actively hunts the city’s most violent gangs. In one notable scene, he walks into a den of armed smugglers with nothing but a stick, screaming at them to shoot him. Because he doesn't flinch at guns pointed at his head, the criminals become unnerved; they assume he is a legendary "super-cop" who is so skilled he doesn't even need a weapon. He clears out entire warehouses of goons by simply walking forward and daring them to fire. His lack of self-preservation makes him a tactical nightmare for the underworld, as he performs stunts like jumping onto moving trucks and walking through explosions without looking back.

This "fearless" streak brings him into direct conflict with Kareli, a high-tech underworld don who controls the city’s arms trafficking. Kareli is baffled by this new, invincible inspector who is systematically dismantling his multi-million dollar business. Meanwhile, Dayashankar’s legendary bravery catches the eye of Pooja, a woman who originally thought he was a loser. She falls in love with the man she perceives as a stoic hero. Dayashankar, however, is increasingly frustrated that he is still alive; every time he tries to get shot, he accidentally arrests the criminal or the gun jams, making him look even more heroic to the public and the media.

The climax begins when Dayashankar prepares for a massive final raid on Kareli’s central fortress, fully expecting to die. Minutes before the operation, the doctor catches up to him and reveals the lab error: Dayashankar is actually perfectly healthy. The "hole in his heart" was just a mistake on a piece of paper. The psychological impact is immediate. The "invincible" Dayashankar disappears, replaced by the shivering coward who is now terrified of the dozens of killers he has spent weeks provoking. He tries to flee the scene, hiding under tables and attempting to resign on the spot, realizing that if he dies now, it’s a permanent loss of a long life.

The situation turns personal when Kareli, tired of the interference, kidnaps Dayashankar’s mother, sister, and Pooja. He lures Dayashankar to a massive industrial shipyard for a final execution. Dayashankar arrives, literally trembling and trying to negotiate for his life, which confuses Kareli’s men who expected the "super-cop." However, when he sees his sister being humiliated and his mother in tears, something snaps. He realizes that while his bravery was based on a lie, the skills he learned—and the protection his family needs—are very real.

The final action sequence is a brutal, extended battle. Dayashankar uses the shipyard's heavy machinery, chains, and cargo containers to thin out Kareli’s army. He stops being a "suicidal" fighter and starts being a smart one. He engages in a grueling hand-to-hand fight with Kareli on a high-altitude platform. Despite being terrified, he pushes through the fear, eventually knocking Kareli into the sea and rescuing his family. The film ends with Dayashankar being honored by the Commissioner. He is no longer the lazy officer he was at the start, nor the suicidal man he was in the middle; he is a genuinely brave man who understands that true courage only exists when you have something to lose.

== Cast ==
- Govinda as Inspector Dayashankar Pandey
- Aditya Pancholi as Inspector Shiva
- Shilpa Shetty as Ritu / Radha
- Gulshan Grover as Contract Killer Billa "Meaow-Meaow"
- Ali Asgar as Dayashankar's Young Brother
- Mohan Joshi as Karianna
- Johnny Lever as Havaldar Babulal
- Tinnu Anand as Tinu / Chhota (Jaichand's brother)
- Rohini Hattangadi as Mrs. Pandey, Dayashankar's Mother
- Raj Babbar as Jaichand
- Shiva Rindani as Babu Kania
- Saeed Jaffrey as Police Commissioner Avtar Kaushik
- Sudhir Dalvi as Mr. Pandey, Dayashankar's Father
- Daya Shankar Pandey as rapist caught by Inspector Shiva at the beginning of the Movie (uncredited role)
- Ghanshyam as Constable
- Manmauji as Constable
- Gurbachchan Singh as Inspector Saxena

== Music ==
The Gambler

Soundtrack album by Anu Malik
- Released: 1995
- Genre: Feature film soundtrack
- Label: TIPS Music
- Producer: Anu Malik

Anu Malik chronology
Akele Hum Akele Tum (1995)	The Gambler (1995)	Suhagraat Se Pehle (1996)

This album is composed by Anu Malik. Most popular songs in album "Hum Unse Mohabbat Karke", "Meri Marji", "Stop That", etc.

#	Title	Singer(s)	Lyricists	Length
1	"Akeli Mein Aayi"	Alisha Chinai	Anwar Sagar	07:12
2	"Chupke Chupke Ghoor Na Mujhko"	Udit Narayan, Vinod Rathod, Anu Malik	Dev Kohli	06:08
3	"Deewangi Ko Tu Meri Pehchaan Jaayegi"	Alka Yagnik, Vinod Rathod	Faaiz Anwar	07:04
4	"Gambler Gambler"	Vinod Rathod, Sadhana Sargam	M. G. Hashmat	06:19
5	"Hum Unse Mohabbat Karke"	Kumar Sanu & Sadhana Sargam	Nawab Arzoo	08:50
6	"Meri Marzi"	Devang Patel	Vinay Dave	07:41
7	"Sajde Na Kiye Maine"	Vinod Rathod, Sadhana Sargam	Ibrahim Ashk	07:13
8	"Stop That"	Devang Patel	Vinay Dave	05:41
9	"Yaar Dakiye Mere Kabootar"	Kumar Sanu, Alka Yagnik	Dev Kohli	08:12
