= Goldene Aue =

Coordinates: 51°26′42″N 11°02′45″E

The Goldene Aue (German pronunciation: [ˈɡɔldənə ˈʔaʊə], "golden lowland", also " ... bottom" or " ... meadow" / " ... pasture", with "Au[e]" referring to a low-lying area, often a wetland) is a valley in eastern Germany, in the states Thuringia and Saxony-Anhalt.

It is situated between the towns Nordhausen in the west, and Sangerhausen in the east. It is bordered by the mountain ranges Harz in the north, and Windleite and Kyffhäuser in the south. The river Helme flows through the Goldene Aue.

== History ==
For a long time, the middle and lower Golden Aue formed a lake, which over time was transformed into an impenetrable swamp area due to silt deposits and natural erosion phenomena.

The area was drained in the Middle Ages by Flemish settlers under the supervision of Walkenried Abbey, and transformed into farmland.

Goldene Aue is also the name of two Verwaltungsgemeinschaften ("collective municipalities") in the valley:

- Goldene Aue, Saxony-Anhalt
- Goldene Aue, Thuringia
