= Uthleben =

- Ortsteil of Heringen
- Interactive map of Uthleben
- Location within Germany Location within Thuringia
- Coordinates: 51°26′N 10°50′E
- Country: Germany
- State: Thuringia
- District: Nordhausen
- Town: Heringen

Area
  - Total: 14.63 km^{2} (5.65 sq mi)
- Elevation: 170 m (560 ft)

Population (2009-12-31)
  - Total: 1,155
  - Density: 78.95/km^{2} (204.5/sq mi)
- Time zone: UTC+01:00 (CET)
  - Summer (DST): UTC+02:00 (CEST)
- Postal codes: 99765
- Dialling codes: 036333

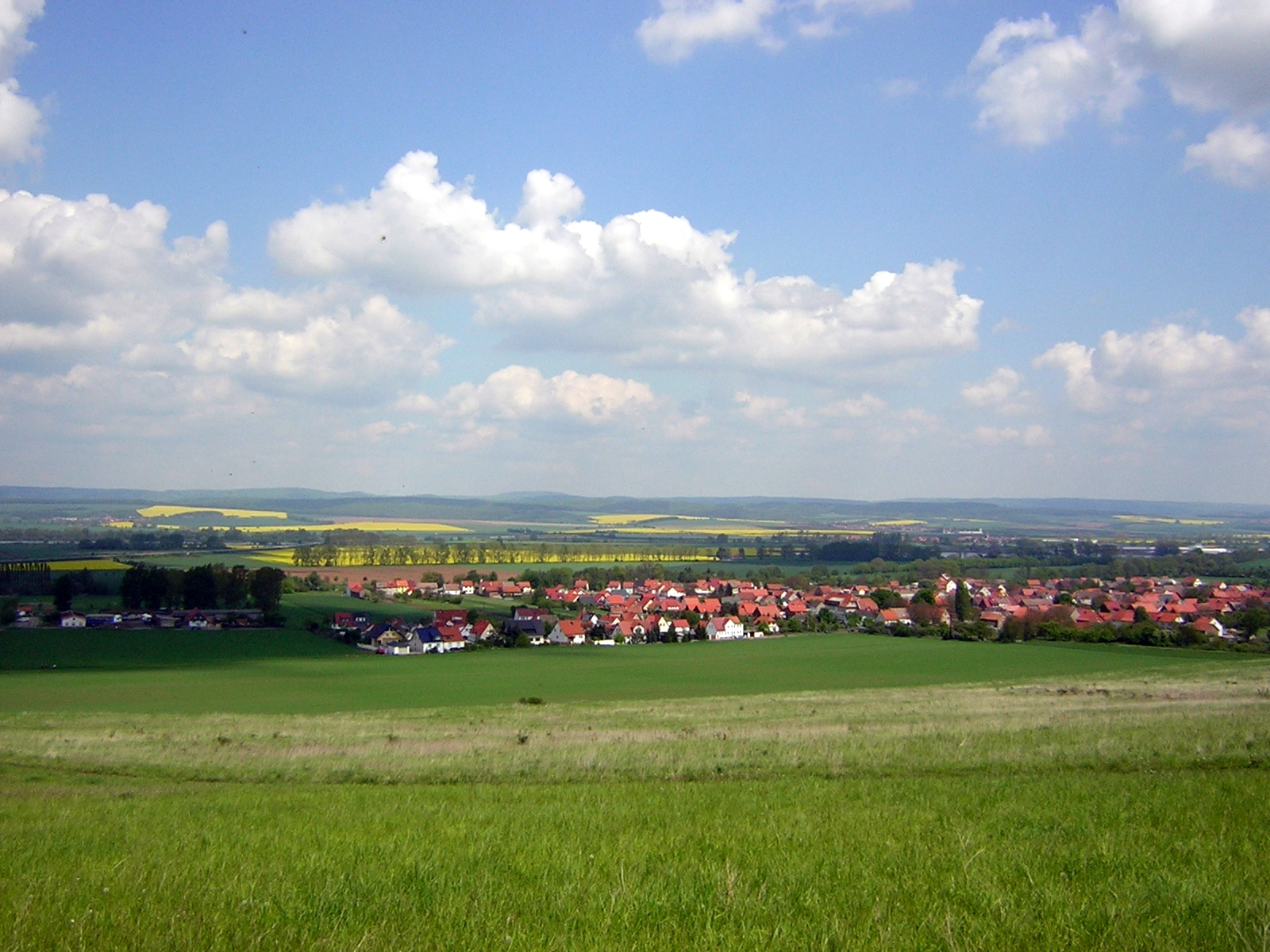
Uthleben

Uthleben is a village and a former municipality in the Nordhausen district, in Thuringia, Germany. Since 1 December 2010, it is part of the town Heringen.
