= Hamma =

- Ortsteil of Heringen
- Interactive map of Hamma
- Location within Germany Location within Thuringia
- Coordinates: 51°25′N 10°53′E
- Country: Germany
- State: Thuringia
- District: Nordhausen
- Town: Heringen

Area
  - Total: 5.76 km^{2} (2.22 sq mi)
- Elevation: 190 m (620 ft)

Population (2009-12-31)
  - Total: 294
  - Density: 51.0/km^{2} (132/sq mi)
- Time zone: UTC+01:00 (CET)
  - Summer (DST): UTC+02:00 (CEST)
- Postal codes: 99765
- Dialling codes: 036333

Hamma is a village and a former municipality in the Nordhausen district, in Thuringia, Germany. Since 1 December 2010, it has been part of the town Heringen.
