= Up'n Away =

Single by Mr. President

from the album Up'n Away - The Album
- Released: April 1994 (Germany)
- Recorded: 1994
- Genre: Eurodance; reggae
- Length: 3:52
- Label: Warner Bros.
- Songwriters: Kai Matthiesen; George Jones
- Producers: Kai Matthiesen; Rainer Gaffrey

Mr. President singles chronology
"MM" (1993)	"Up'n Away" (1994)	"I'll Follow the Sun" (1995)

Music video
- "Up'n Away" on YouTube

"Up'N Away" is a song by German Eurodance group Mr. President, released in April 1994 by Warner Bros. as the second single from their debut album, Up'n Away - The Album (1995). It was co-written by Kai Matthiesen and produced by him with Rainer Gaffrey, and was the first song ever that received a golden record without charting in the German top ten. This was also the last single to receive participation from rapper George "Sir Prophet" Jones, as Delroy "Layzee Dee" Rennalls replaced him soon after the release. To avoid confusion after Jones left the group, the song was rerecorded for their debut album, with Rennalls providing the lead vocals as he did for the rest of the album's songs.

In 2000, the song was again remixed and released under the title "Up'N Away 2K" featuring the vocals of Delroy Rennalls, but the remix failed to chart. In 2014, the song was sampled by German dance act ItaloBrothers on the song "Up 'N Away".

== Critical reception ==
Pan-European magazine Music & Media wrote, "This is a bit of an oddity, as it employs virtually all styles currently hip in the dance arena. It could be considered the German answer to the UK's current jungle craze."

== Music video ==
The accompanying music video for "Up'n Away" was directed by Hubert Bodner and filmed in Germany, featuring the band's lineup singing and dancing at the Frankfurt Airport. The video was A-listed on German music television channel VIVA in November 1994 and received "prime break out" rotation on MTV Europe.

== Track listings ==
- CD maxi - Europe (1994)
1. "Up'n Away" (Radio Mix)- 3:52
2. "Up'n Away" (Extended Mix) - 5:55
3. "Up'n Away" (Club Mix) - 6:33
- CD single, 12" maxi - Remixes (1994)
1. "Up'n Away" (Peter's Groove Away Mix)- 5:58
2. "Up'n Away" (Peter's Dub Mix) - 7:15

== Charts ==
=== Weekly charts ===
Chart (1994–1995)	Peak position
Austria (Ö3 Austria Top 40)	6
Denmark (IFPI)	14
Europe (Eurochart Hot 100)	42
Finland (Suomen virallinen lista)	17
Germany (GfK)	12
Sweden (Sverigetopplistan)	24
Switzerland (Schweizer Hitparade)	17

=== Year-end charts ===
Chart (1994)	Position
Germany (Media Control Charts)	86

== Certifications ==
Region	Certification	Certified units/sales
Germany (BVMI)	Gold	250,000^{^}
^{^} Shipments figures based on certification alone.
