= We See the Same Sun =

Studio album by Mr. President
- Released: 13 May 1996
- Recorded: 1995
- Studios: Das Studio, Bremen, Germany
- Genre: Eurodance
- Producers: Kai Matthiesen, Rainer Gaffrey (co-producer; tracks 1 and 2)

Mr. President chronology
Up'n Away - The Album (1995)	We See the Same Sun (1996)	Night Club (1997)

Professional ratings
Review scores
Source	Rating
Music Week	3/5 stars
Sunday Mirror	7/10 stars

We See the Same Sun is the second studio album by German Eurodance group Mr. President, released in May 1996.

This album arranged the band's international breakthrough, including three hit singles: "Coco Jamboo", their most successful song that entered the charts all over Europe, Australia and the United States, "I Give You My Heart" and "Show Me the Way". The album also contains a song recorded with German singer Nino De Angelo, "Olympic Dreams".

In the year of its release the band won a Viva Comet for Best Dance Act and 12 months later they received an Echo award for their international success with We See the Same Sun, being the best selling German artist outside Germany.

== Critical reception ==
British magazine Music Week viewed We See the Same Sun as a "sunny, sparky debut album".

== Track listing ==
No.	Title	Writer(s)	Producer(s)	Length
1.	"Intro (We See)"	-	-	1:21
2.	"Coco Jamboo"	Kai Matthiesen, Delroy Rennals, Rainer Gaffrey	Kai Mathiesen, Rainer Gaffrey	3:38
3.	"Side to Side"	Kai Matthiesen, Delroy Rennals, Rainer Gaffrey	Kai Mathiesen, Rainer Gaffrey	3:32
4.	"Goodbye Lonely Heart"	Kai Matthiesen, Karsten Günther	Kai Matthiesen	3:24
5.	"I Give You My Heart"	Kai Matthiesen, Delroy Rennals, Robin Masters	Kai Matthiesen	3:35
6.	"Love Zone"	Kai Matthiesen, Robin Masters	Kai Matthiesen	3:23
7.	"Show Me the Way"	Kai Matthiesen, Delroy Rennals, Karsten Günther	Kai Matthiesen	3:30
8.	"Olympic Dreams"	Dave Dunhill, Mick Dash	Kai Matthiesen	3:34
9.	"You Can Get It"	Kai Matthiesen, Delroy Rennals, William King III	Kai Matthiesen	3:41
10.	"Don't You Ever Stop"	Kai Matthiesen, Delroy Rennals, William King III	Kai Matthiesen	3:51
11.	"Turn It Up"	Kai Matthiesen, Delroy Rennals, Robin Masters	Kai Matthiesen	3:43
12.	"I Love the Way You Love Me"	Kai Matthiesen, Delroy Rennals, Robin Masters	Kai Matthiesen	3:30
13.	"I Love to Love"	Delroy Rennals, Jack Robinson, James Bolden	Kai Matthiesen	3:10
14.	"Where the Sun Goes Down"	Kai Matthiesen, Robin Masters, Caren Miller	Kai Matthiesen	3:25
15.	"Outro (We See)"	-	-	1:09

== Charts ==
=== Weekly charts ===
Chart (1996)	Peak position
Austrian Albums (Ö3 Austria)	15
Dutch Albums (Album Top 100)	80
Finnish Albums (Suomen virallinen lista)	1
German Albums (Offizielle Top 100)	16
Hungarian Albums (MAHASZ)	1
Swedish Albums (Sverigetopplistan)	56
Swiss Albums (Schweizer Hitparade)	9

=== Year-end charts ===
Chart (1996)	Position
German Albums (Official Top 100)	72

== Sales and certifications ==
Certifications for We See the Same Sun
Region	Certification	Certified units/sales
Finland (Musiikkituottajat)	Platinum	74,427
Japan (RIAJ)	Platinum	200,000^{^}
Poland (ZPAV)	Platinum	100,000^{*}
Switzerland (IFPI Switzerland)	Gold	25,000^{^}
^{*} Sales figures based on certification alone.^{^} Shipments figures based on certification alone.
