= I'll Follow the Sun (Mr. President song) =

Single by Mr. President

from the album Up'n Away - The Album
- B-side: "Up'n Away"
- Released: March 3, 1995
- Genre: Eurodance
- Length: 3:23
- Label: Warner Bros.
- Songwriters: Kai Matthiesen; Delroy Rennalls; Robin Masters
- Producer: Kai Matthiesen

Mr. President singles chronology
"Up'n Away" (1994)	"I'll Follow the Sun" (1995)	"Coco Jamboo" (1996)

Music video
- "I'll Follow the Sun" on YouTube

"I'll Follow the Sun" is a song by German Eurodance group Mr. President, released in March 1995, by Warner Bros. Records, as the second single from their first album, Up'n Away - The Album (1995). It was the first single to receive participation from rapper Delroy "Layzee Dee" Rennalls, after George "Sir Prophet" Jones left the group. Rennalls also co-wrote the lyrics with Robin Masters and producer Kai Matthiesen. A moderate success on the charts in Europe, "I'll Follow the Sun" became a top-20 hit in Finland (15), Switzerland (16) and Austria (18). In Germany, it peaked at number 23 and spent 14 weeks inside the German Singles Chart. On the Eurochart Hot 100, the song reached number 58 in its second week on the chart, after charting in Austria, Denmark, Finland and Germany.

== Critical reception ==
Pan-European magazine Music & Media wrote, "When the Euro president pushes the red button, you'll hear a big bang which clatters like a speeded up bassline from Jacko's 'Billy Jean' with souped-up Giorgio Moroder computer disco."

== Music video ==
The accompanying music video for "I'll Follow the Sun" was directed by Czar and filmed in Palm Springs, Los Angeles. It was A-listed on German music television channel VIVA in March 1995.

== Track listing ==
- CD maxi, Germany (1995)
1. "I'll Follow the Sun" (Radio Edit) – 3:23
2. "I'll Follow the Sun" (Extended Version) – 5:36
3. "I'll Follow the Sun" (Discotheque Version) – 5:36
4. "Up'n Away" (Mix Version) – 5:42
- CD maxi - Remixes, Germany (1995)
1. "I'll Follow the Sun" (Peter Parker Dub Mix) – 6:13
2. "I'll Follow the Sun" (Peter Parker Compact Mix) – 5:40
3. "I'll Follow the Sun" (DJ Perplexer Remix) – 4:43

== Charts ==
Chart (1995)	Peak position
Austria (Ö3 Austria Top 40)	18
Europe (Eurochart Hot 100)	58
Finland (Suomen virallinen lista)	15
Germany (GfK)	23
Switzerland (Schweizer Hitparade)	16
