= Night Club (album) =

Studio album by Mr. President
- Released: 12 August 1997
- Studios: Das Studio, Bremen, Germany
- Genre: Eurodance
- Label: WEA
- Producer: Kai Matthiesen

Mr. President chronology
We See the Same Sun (1996)	Night Club (1997)	Space Gate (1999)

Night Club is the third album by German Eurodance group Mr. President, released in August 1997. This album features four hit singles: "Jojo Action", "Take Me to the Limit", "Where Do I Belong" and "Happy People".

== Track listing ==
No.	Title	Length
1.	"So They Set Off (Intro)"	1:30
2.	"You Can Dance"	4:12
3.	"Hasta Mañana"	4:19
4.	"I Won't Let You Down"	3:23
5.	"Jojo Action"	3:50
6.	"Take Me to the Limit"	3:36
7.	"Happy People"	4:25
8.	"Where Do I Belong"	3:43
9.	"Gonna Get Up"	4:05
10.	"I Wanna Give My Love To You"	3:33
11.	"Take Your Chance"	4:13
12.	"Inline-Outline"	3:21
13.	"The Music Disappeared (Outro)"	0:42

== Charts ==
Chart (1997)	Peak position
Austrian Albums (Ö3 Austria)	15
Finnish Albums (Suomen virallinen lista)	10
German Albums (Offizielle Top 100)	10
Hungarian Albums (MAHASZ)	10
Swiss Albums (Schweizer Hitparade)	1
