= Up'n Away – The Album =

Studio album by Mr. President
- Released: 25 March 1995
- Studios: Das Studio, Bremen, Germany
- Genre: Eurodance
- Label: WEA
- Producer: Kai Matthiesen

Mr. President chronology
Up'n Away – The Album (1995)	We See the Same Sun (1996)

Up'n Away – The Album is the first album by German Eurodance group Mr. President, released in March 1995. This album features four hit singles: "Up'n Away", "I'll Follow the Sun", "4 On the Floor" and "Gonna Get Along (Without Ya Now)".

== Track listing ==
No.	Title	Length
1.	"Intro"	1:20
2.	"Up'n Away"	3:53
3.	"4 On the Floor"	3:17
4.	"On My Mind"	3:55
5.	"I Believe"	3:37
6.	"Close to You"	3:22
7.	"Never Leave Me"	3:48
8.	"I'll Follow the Sun"	3:23
9.	"Easy Come, Easy Go"	3:13
10.	"Sweet Lies"	4:21
11.	"Close to Your Heart"	3:14
12.	"Gonna Get Along (Without Ya Now)"	2:38
13.	"I Would Die for You"	3:12
14.	"Keep It Up!"	3:02
15.	"Outro"	0:52
16.	"Up'n Away" (Peter's Groove Away Mix)	5:58

== Charts ==
Chart performance for Up'n Away – The Album
Chart (1995)	Peak position
Finnish Albums (Suomen virallinen lista)	4
German Albums (Offizielle Top 100)	37
Hungarian Albums (MAHASZ)	11
Swiss Albums (Schweizer Hitparade)	38

== Sales and certifications ==
Certifications for Up'n Away – The Album
Region	Certification	Certified units/sales
Finland (Musiikkituottajat)	Platinum	46,925
