= Kalbsrieth =

- Municipality
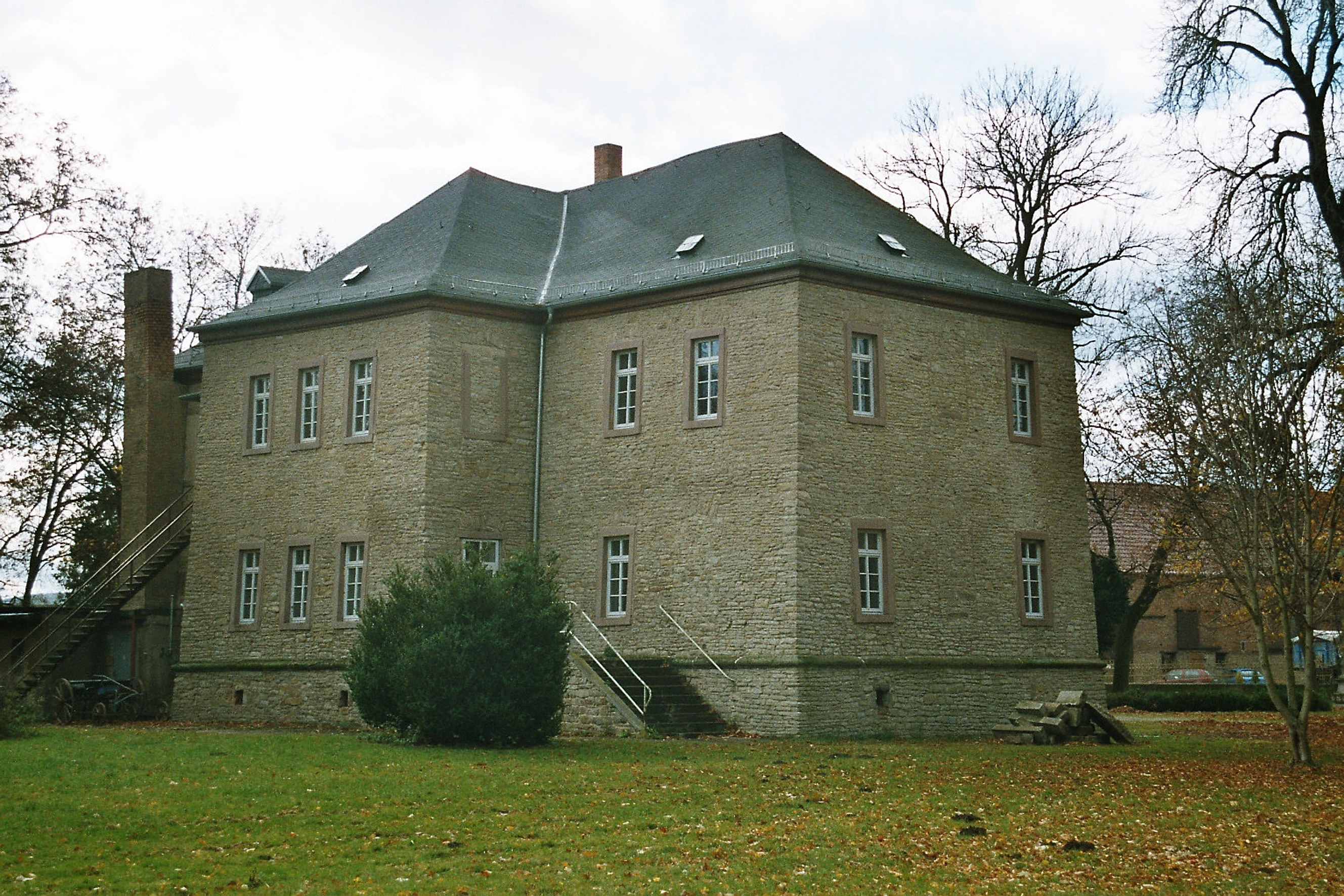
- Kalbsrieth Castle

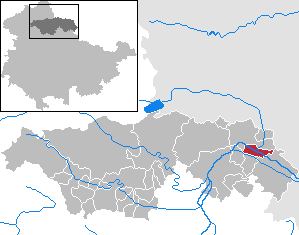
- Location of Kalbsrieth within Kyffhäuserkreis district
- Interactive map of Kalbsrieth
- Location within Germany Location within Thuringia
- Coordinates: 51°20′34″N 11°20′13″E
- Country: Germany
- State: Thuringia
- District: Kyffhäuserkreis

Government
  - Mayor (2022–28): Uwe Ludwig

Area
  - Total: 11.94 km^{2} (4.61 sq mi)
- Elevation: 121 m (397 ft)

Population (2025-12-31)
  - Total: 591
  - Density: 49.5/km^{2} (128/sq mi)
- Time zone: UTC+01:00 (CET)
  - Summer (DST): UTC+02:00 (CEST)
- Postal codes: 06556
- Dialling codes: 0 34 66
- Vehicle registration: KYF

Kalbsrieth is a municipality in the district Kyffhäuserkreis, in Thuringia, Germany.

== Historical Population ==
Population as of 31 December:

- 1994 – 908
- 1995 – 908
- 1996 – 901
- 1997 – 888
- 1998 – 844
- 1999 – 847
- 2000 – 839
- 2001 – 839
- 2002 – 826
- 2003 – 813
- 2004 – 797
- 2005 – 796
- 2006 – 789
- 2007 – 785
- 2008 – 789
- 2009 – 758
- 2010 – 749
- 2011 – 705
- 2012 – 690
- 2013 – 681
- 2014 – 662
- 2015 – 656
- 2016 – 645

Data source: Thuringian Statistical Bureau of State

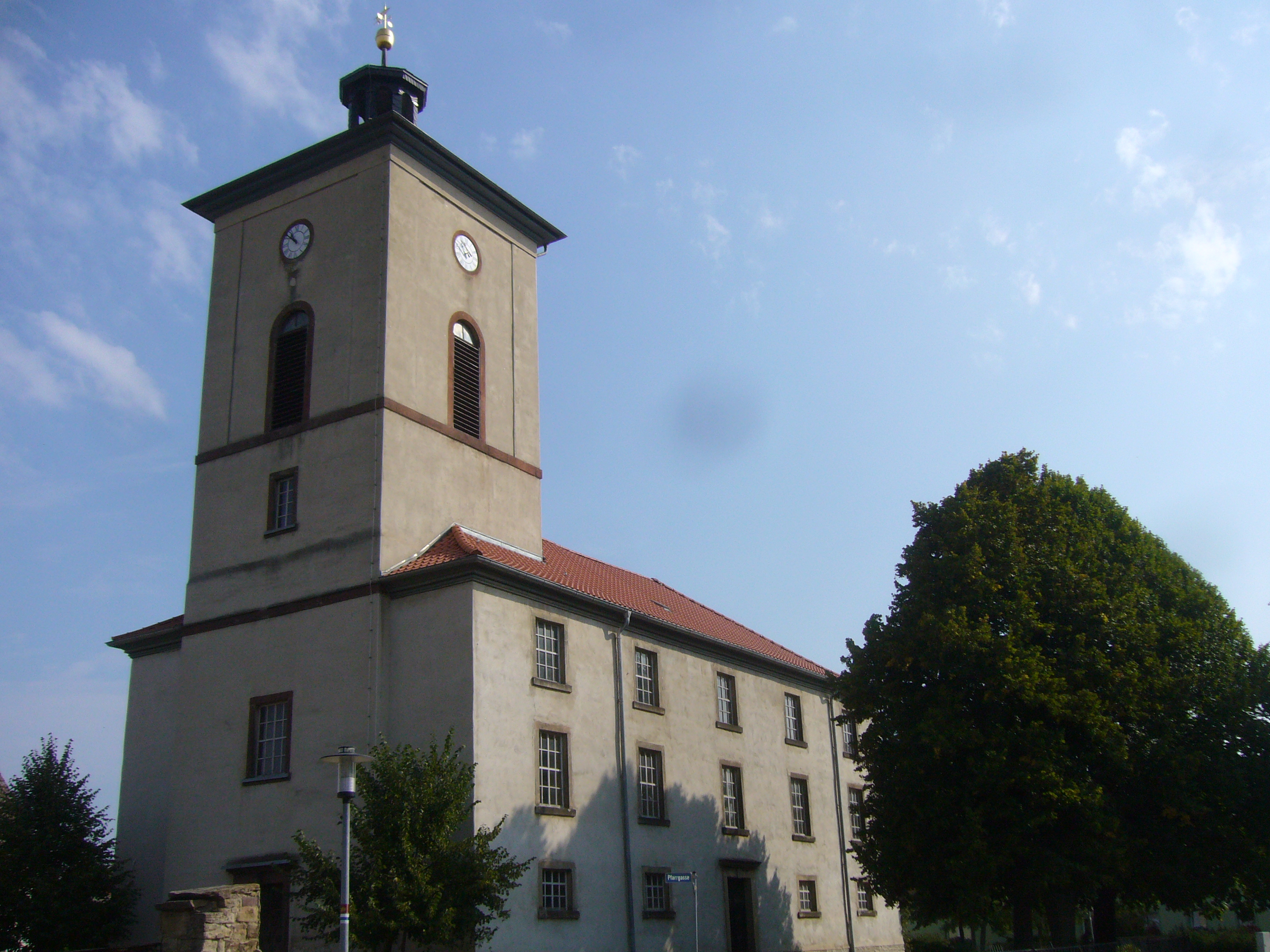
St. Johannis, Village Chapel

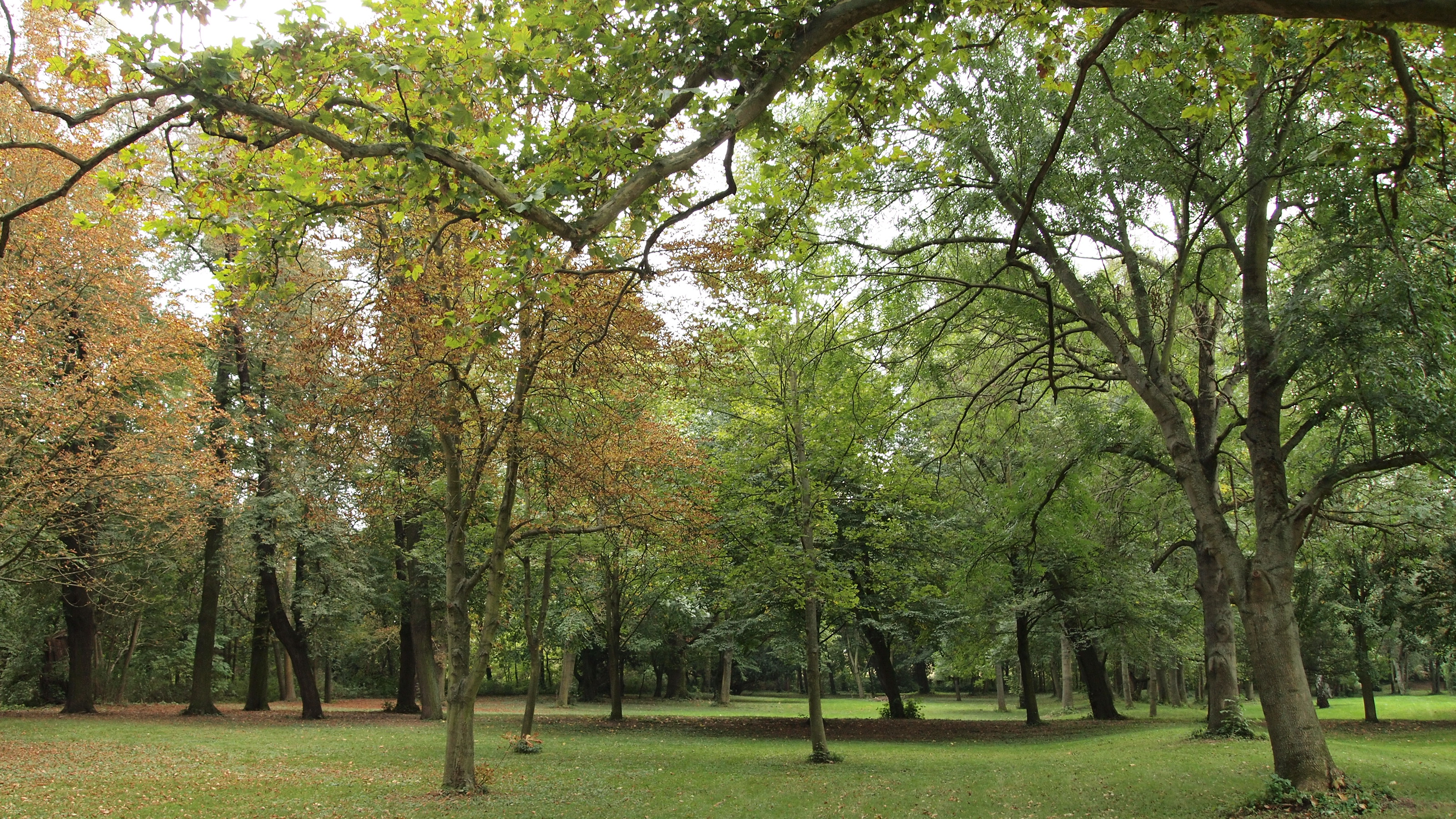
Trees in the castle park
