= Steina (Schwalm) =

River in Hesse, Germany

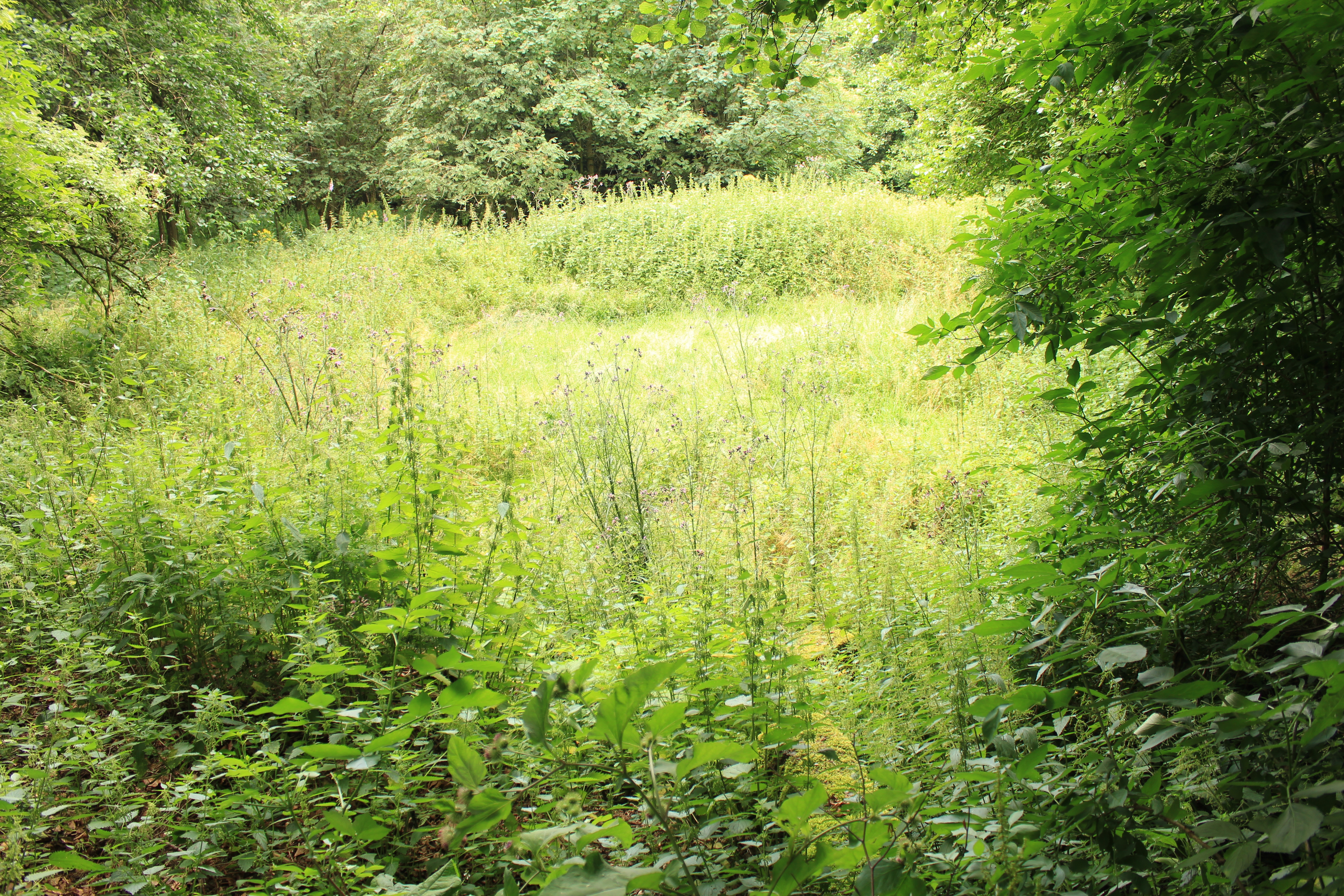

Location
- Country: Germany
- State: Hesse

Physical characteristics
- Mouth
  - location: Schwalm
  - coordinates: 50.8939°N 9.2557°E
- Length: 13.9 km (8.6 mi)

Basin features
- Progression: Schwalm→ Eder→ Fulda→ Weser→ North Sea

Steina (German pronunciation: [ˈʃtaɪna]) is a river of Hesse, Germany. It flows into the Schwalm near Ziegenhain.

== See also ==
- List of rivers of Hesse
