= Werther, Thuringia =

Werther
- Municipality
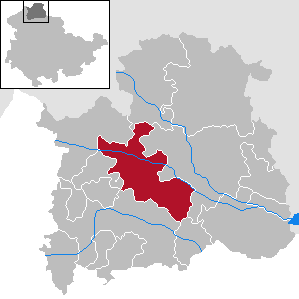
- Location of Werther within Nordhausen district
- Interactive map of Werther
- Location within Germany Location within Thuringia
- Coordinates: 51°28′12″N 10°44′43″E
- Country: Germany
- State: Thuringia
- District: Nordhausen
- Subdivisions: 9

Government
  - Mayor (2021–27): Manfred Handke

Area
  - Total: 61.94 km^{2} (23.92 sq mi)
- Elevation: 200 m (660 ft)

Population (2025-12-31)
  - Total: 3,047
  - Density: 49.19/km^{2} (127.4/sq mi)
- Time zone: UTC+01:00 (CET)
  - Summer (DST): UTC+02:00 (CEST)
- Postal codes: 99735
- Dialling codes: 03631
- Vehicle registration: NDH
- Website: gemeinde-werther.de

Werther (German pronunciation: [ˈveːɐ̯tɐ]) is a municipality in the district of Nordhausen, in Thuringia, Germany.

== People from Werther ==
- Karl Eberhard Herwarth von Bittenfeld (1796–1884), Prussian field marshal
