= Osterhagen =

Coordinates: 51°35′29″N 10°29′3″E

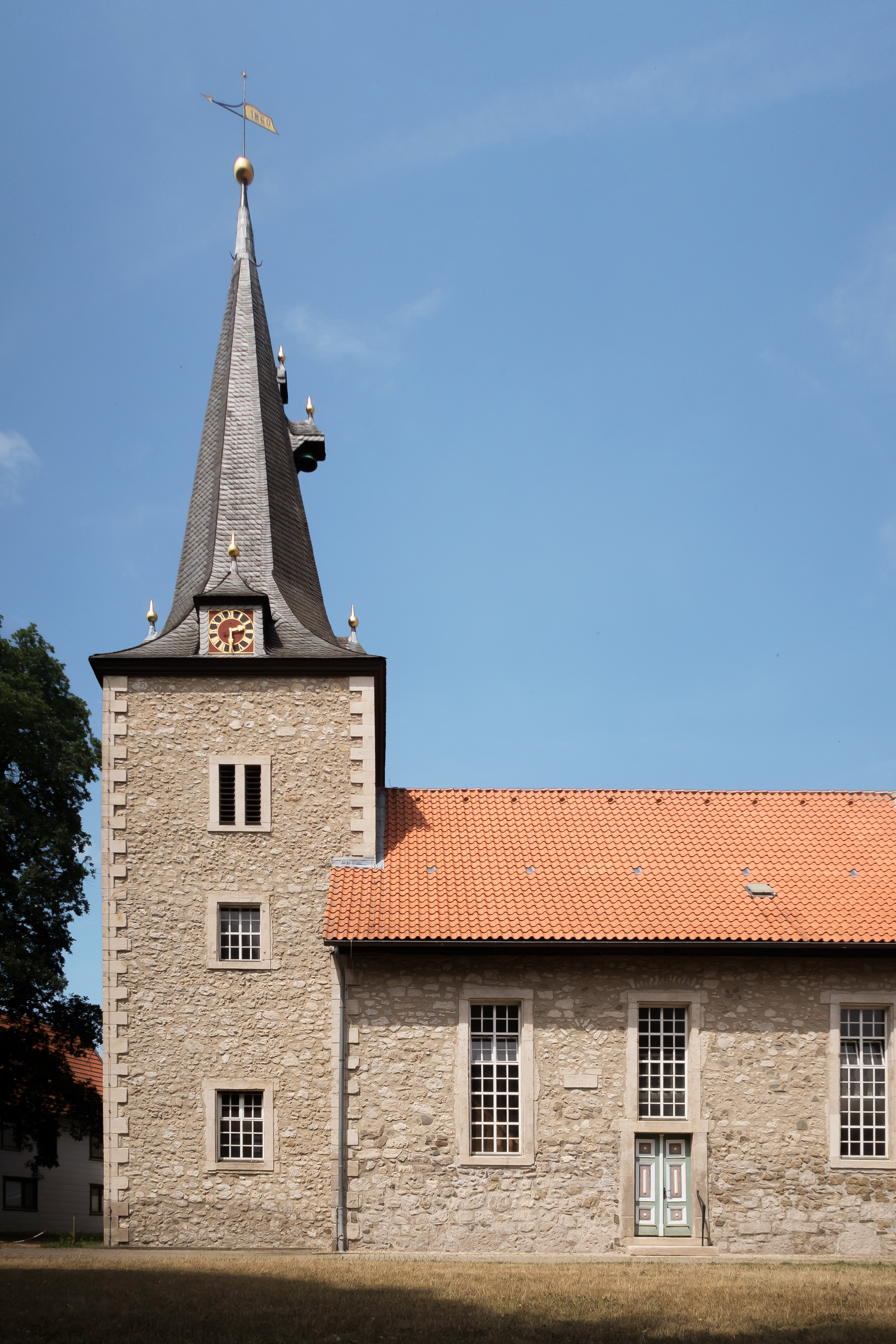
Osterhagen, reformed church (Sankt-Martins-Kirche)

Osterhagen is a village near the town of Bad Lauterberg in the district of Göttingen in Lower Saxony, Germany. The village lies between Bad Lauterberg and Bad Sachsa. Not far from Osterhagen is the Weingartenloch, a supposed treasure cave. The Karstwanderweg passes nearby.

Osterhagen lies on the Uerdingen line, in the traditional area of the Eastphalian language, a Low German dialect. Osterhagen lies not far from the border of Thuringia.

== Recent history ==
In July 1944, in a former brick pit near Osterhagen, a concentration camp for about 300 prisoners was built with the aim of finishing the Osterhagen-Nordhausen railway line. Today there is a memorial and an information panel on the edge of the former camp grounds.
