= Show Me the Way (Mr. President song) =

Single by Mr. President

from the album We See the Same Sun
- Released: 1996
- Studio: Das Studio, Bremen
- Genre: Downtempo; ballad; synth-pop
- Length: 3:48
- Label: Warner Bros.
- Songwriters: Delroy Rennalls; Karsten Günther
- Producer: Kai Matthiesen

Mr. President singles chronology
"I Give You My Heart" (1996)	"Show Me the Way" (1996)	"Jojo Action" (1997)

Music video
- "Show Me the Way" on YouTube

"Show Me the Way" is a song by German Eurodance group Mr. President, released in 1996, by Warner Bros. Records, as the third and last single from their second album, We See the Same Sun (1996). It is co-written by group member Delroy Rennalls with Karsten Günther and produced by Kai Matthiesen. The beat to "How Deep Is Your Love" by Bee Gees was merely sampled for a small portion of the song. It was a moderate hit in Europe, becoming a top-20 hit in Denmark, Austria and Finland. In Germany and Switzerland, it was a top-30 hit. The CD single also includes the song performed with a Philharmonic Orchestra. The accompanying music video was directed by John Buche, featuring the group in a Casino and was filmed in Vienna, Austria. Buche had previously directed the videos for Mr. President's previous hit-singles "Coco Jamboo" and "I Give You My Heart".

== Track listing ==
- 12" single, Germany (1996)
1. "Show Me the Way" (Extended Version) — 5:40
2. "Show Me the Way" (Radio Edit) — 3:46
3. "Coco Jamboo" (Christmas Version) — 3:33
4. "Show Me the Way" (Philharmonic Orchestra Version) — 4:01
- CD single, Europe (1997)
1. "Show Me the Way" (Radio Edit) — 3:48
2. "Show Me the Way" (Philharmonic Orchestra Version) — 3:33
- CD maxi, Europe (1997)
1. "Show Me the Way" (Radio Edit) — 3:48
2. "Show Me the Way" (Extended Version) — 5:40
3. "Show Me the Way" (Philharmonic Orchestra Version) — 3:33
4. "Show Me the Way" (Candy Club´s R & B Xperimental Mix) — 5:08

== Charts ==
Chart (1996–97)	Peak position
Austria (Ö3 Austria Top 40)	18
Denmark (IFPI)	11
Europe (Eurochart Hot 100)	52
Europe (European Dance Radio)	17
Finland (Suomen virallinen lista)	19
Germany (GfK)	28
Sweden (Sverigetopplistan)	59
Switzerland (Schweizer Hitparade)	21
