= I Give You My Heart (Mr. President song) =

1996 single by Mr. President

Single by Mr. President

from the album We See the Same Sun
- Released: 26 July 1996
- Recorded: Das Studio
- Genre: Eurodance; Europop
- Length: 3:33
- Label: Warner Bros.
- Songwriters: Delroy Rennalls; Rainer Gaffrey
- Producers: Kai Matthiesen; Rainer Gaffrey

Mr. President singles chronology
"Coco Jamboo" (1996)	"I Give You My Heart" (1996)	"Show Me the Way" (1996)

Music video
- "I Give You My Heart" on YouTube

"I Give You My Heart" is a song by German Eurodance group Mr. President, released in July 1996 by Warner Bros. as the second single from their second album, We See the Same Sun (1996). It is written by group member Delroy Rennalls with Rainer Gaffrey, who produced it with Kai Matthiesen. It was also the group's seventh released single and the follow-up to their highly successful "Coco Jamboo". "I Give You My Heart" was a top-10 hit in the Czech Republic, Finland, Germany, Hungary and Switzerland. It was certified with a gold record in Germany and the accompanying music video features the group performing in a movie theater in Vienna, Austria.

== Chart performance ==
"I Give You My Heart" was quite successful on the charts across Europe. Although it didn't reach the same level of success as "Coco Jamboo", it became a top-10 hit in Czech Republic (8), Finland (9), Germany (7), Hungary (5) and Switzerland (6). In Germany, it peaked at number seven for two weeks. It spent 5 weeks inside the top 10 and 17 weeks in total on the German Singles Chart. Additionally, the single was a top-20 hit in Austria, Denmark and Norway, while on the Eurochart Hot 100, it peaked at number 25 in September 1996, after 4 weeks on the chart. It charted also in the United Kingdom, where it reached number 52 on the UK Singles Chart in its first week on the chart. "I Give You My Heart" was awarded with a gold record in Germany, after 250,000 singles were sold there.

== Critical reception ==
British magazine Music Week gave "I Give You My Heart" a score of three out of five, writing, "Totally uncool, but this is one of those infectious Europop anthems where no sonic trick is left unexploited. A fun outing which should follow 'Coco Jamboo' into the charts."

== Music video ==
The music video for "I Give You My Heart" was directed by John Buche & Florian Kehrer. It was released alongside the single and features the band's lineup singing at the Filmcasino theatre, a retro cinema in Vienna, Austria, while different people watch a silent movie. There is a storyline of a male visitor falling in love with the woman in the ticket gate, played by group member Daniela 'Lady Danii' Haak. Buche had previously directed the music video for "Coco Jamboo".

== Track listings ==
- 12-inch vinyl, Germany (1996)

A1. "I Give You My Heart" (Extended Edit) — 5:43
A2. "I Give You My Heart" (Robin Masters Club Mix) — 5:08
A3. "I Give You My Heart" (Stylus Full Tension Story) — 6:31
B1. "I Give You My Heart" (Stylus Super Sound Maxi Version) — 7:53
B2. "I Give You My Heart" (Candy Stations President Mix) — 5:16
B3. "I Give You My Heart" (Video Version) — 3:51

- CD single, Europe (1996)
1. "I Give You My Heart" (Radio Edit) — 3:37
2. "I Give You My Heart" (Robin Masters' Club Mix) — 5:08
- CD maxi, Europe (1996)
1. "I Give You My Heart" (Radio Edit) — 3:37
2. "I Give You My Heart" (Extended Edit) — 5:43
3. "I Give You My Heart" (Robin Masters' Club Mix) — 5:08
4. "I Give You My Heart" (Steven Edwards' Kick Drum Mix) — 5:21
5. "I Give You My Heart" (Video Version) — 3:51
6. "I Give You My Heart" (Candy Stations President Mix) — 5:16

== Charts and certifications ==
=== Weekly charts ===
Chart (1996)	Peak position
Austria (Ö3 Austria Top 40)	12
Belgium (Ultratop 50 Flanders)	27
Czech Republic (IFPI CR)	8
Denmark (IFPI)	20
Europe (Eurochart Hot 100)	25
Europe (European Dance Radio)	10
Finland (Suomen virallinen lista)	9
Germany (GfK)	7
Hungary (Mahasz)	5
Mexico (Notitas Musicales)	6
Netherlands (Dutch Top 40 Tipparade)	13
Netherlands (Dutch Single Tip)	14
Norway (VG-lista)	15
Scotland (OCC)	33
Sweden (Sverigetopplistan)	47
Switzerland (Schweizer Hitparade)	6
UK Singles (OCC)	52

=== Year-end charts ===
Chart (1996)	Position
Germany (Media Control)	43
Switzerland (Schweizer Hitparade)	55

== Sales and certifications ==
Region	Certification	Certified units/sales
Germany (BVMI)	Gold	250,000^{^}
^{^} Shipments figures based on certification alone.
