= Mr. President (band) =

1991–2008 German Eurodance group

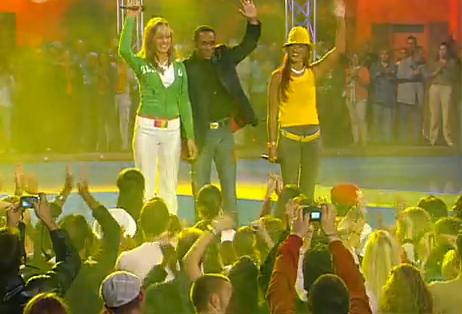
- The final line-up of Mr. President, featuring (from left to right) Franzi, LayZee and Lady Danii, perform Coco Jamboo at Hit Giganten, 2004

Background information
- Also known as: Satellite One
- Origin: Bremen, Germany
- Genres: Eurodance, pop, hip hop, reggae fusion
- Years active: 1991–2008
- Label: Warner Bros. Records (1994–2003)
- Past members: Delroy Rennalls (LayZee); Judith Hildebrandt (T-Seven); Daniela Haak (Lady Danii); George Jones (Sir Prophet); Myriam Beckmann (Myra); Franziska Frank (Franzi); Nadia Ayche; Caren Miller; Anne Schroeder; William King III

Mr. President was a German Eurodance musical group known for the crossover hit "Coco Jamboo", released in 1996. The group is also known in Europe for the dance hits "Up'n Away", "I'll Follow the Sun", "I Give You My Heart", "4 on the Floor", "Jojo Action", and the albums Up'n Away – The Album and We See the Same Sun.

Mr. President was originally formed in 1991 in Bremen by producers Jens Neumann and Kai Matthiesen. Initially, the group consisted of German singers Judith Hildebrandt (T-Seven), Daniela Haak (Lady Danii), and American rapper George Jones (Sir Prophet). In 1994, Jones was replaced by British rapper Delroy Rennalls (Layzee Dee). When Hildebrandt departed from the act in 2000 to pursue a solo career, singer Nadia Ayche joined the group as her replacement. However, Ayche was quickly succeeded by singer Myra Beckmann in 2001. After Beckmann also left the act in 2003, singer Franziska Frank (Franzi) joined the group. By 2008, Mr. President had officially disbanded.

Since 2008, Rennalls has continued to tour across Europe as LayZee, formerly of Mr. President, in addition to releasing his own solo material. In 2014, he recruited Hungarian-born singer Erika Kovács into his live act. Today, Rennalls and Kovács perform the Mr. President hits as a live duo act worldwide.

== History ==
=== Group Origins (1991–1993) ===
In 1991, German DJs Jens Neumann and Kai Matthiesen formed a live rapper-singer duo act called Satellite One, consisting of American rapper George Jones and German singer Daniela Haak. When Neumann brought German singer Judith Hildebrandt into the act, Satellite One officially became a trio. Each of the band members soon adopted stage names, with Hildebrandt becoming "T-Seven", while Jones and Haak were known as "Sir Prophet" and "Lady Danii", respectively.

After a few years of performing in clubs without any mainstream success, Neumann and Matthiesen, now acting as both managers and producers, decided to change the band's name to Mr. President. Under the new name, the group created an underground dance club hit with the song "MM", an acronym meaning (Marilyn Monroe) in 1993.

=== Success with "Up n' Away" (1994–1995) ===
Following the success of their underground hit, Mr. President released the track "Up'n Away". In mid-1994, Neumann replaced Jones with British rapper Delroy Rennalls (Layzee Dee). The first full-length Mr. President album, Up'n Away – The Album, was released in 1995, featuring a new version of "Up'n Away" with Rennalls' rap vocals. The album also included the hit single "I'll Follow the Sun".

=== Mainstream success with "Coco Jamboo" (1996) ===
In 1996, Neumann and Matthiesen decided to embrace a radically different sound for the next Mr. President single. The reggae-fusion-inspired hit "Coco Jamboo" quickly became a crossover success worldwide. It was the first Mr. President single to chart in the UK, peaking at No. 8, and in the United States, where it reached No. 21 on the Billboard Hot 100. "Coco Jamboo" was featured on the album We See the Same Sun alongside the hit singles "I Give You My Heart" and "Show Me the Way".

=== Night Club and Space Gate (1996–1999) ===
Hoping to capitalize on the success of We See the Same Sun, Mr. President went back to recording in 1996 and once again employed their lighter sound on the 1997 CD Night Club. "Jojo Action", the first single released from Night Club, contributed to the band's continued success in Europe, peaking as high as No. 3 in Austria. Although the next three hits from the album charted impressively in Europe, none of the singles managed to chart in the United States. During the promotional campaign for Night Club in 1997, Lady Danii took a brief leave from the group to perform with the band Reset, but she returned a few months later.

In the midst of promotion, Haak, Hildebrandt, and Rennalls were accused of not using their own voices in any of Mr. President's songs. German magazine Stern reported the scandal, which was first revealed on German radio station Bremen 4. According to their report, the actual voices belonged to Caren Miller, Anne Schroeder, and William King III. However, Matthiesen and Neumann appeared in a televised interview on German channel VIVA and explained that the voices were indeed those of Daniela and Judith, but that their pitches had been technically edited during recording. In 2014, NWZonline.de published an article about Caren Miller, stating that she was a studio singer and co-composer with Mr. President. According to her, it didn’t bother her that only Judith Hildebrandt and Daniela Haak appeared on stage, as it was simply stressful for the two front women. Miller left the band in 2000, at the same time as Hildebrandt.

A year later, Mr. President released Space Gate, which marked a return to their earlier sound. "Give a Little Love" and "Simbaleo" proved to be moderate successes, but the band was once again unable to match their 1996 success.

=== Compilation album and hiatus (1999–2000) ===
After six months away from the studio in 1999, Mr. President returned in the new millennium with A Kind of... Best!, their first singles compilation CD. Accompanying the CD was "Up N' Away 2k", the band's new single, which failed to chart even in Germany. Following the lack of success of their latest single and their fading public image, Judith Hildebrandt left the group in February 2000 to pursue her solo career. After Hildebrandt's departure, the band decided to concentrate on releasing another compilation album, Golden Super Hits, released near the end of 2000.

=== Lineup changes, and Forever & One Day album (2001–2004) ===
Mr. President reemerged in early 2001 after hiring classical singer Nadia Ayche. Although the band performed live with Ayche and even began recording new songs, she was dismissed in 2002 due to directional disagreements with the group. Ayche's replacement, Myra Beckmann, was hired soon after, and the new lineup immediately began recording songs for their next CD.

After almost a year in the studio, Forever & One Day was released in the summer of 2003, with Love, Sex and Sunshine as the lead single. After nearly four years away from the European music scene, the band's latest single managed to chart impressively well, peaking at No. 23 in Germany. The following single, Forever & One Day, was released a few weeks later and performed similarly well, reaching No. 51 in their homeland. However, just a few months into the tour, Beckmann was forced to leave the band due to undisclosed health issues, leaving Haak and Rennalls to perform as a duo for the remainder of the tour. Once again, the band was compelled to find someone to fill the vacant lead vocalist position, and a few weeks later, they hired established pop singer Franziska "Franzi" Frank.

=== Final singles and breakup (2004–2008) ===
Immediately following the Forever & One Day tour, the band announced its intentions to create a new CD. Despite this announcement, nothing ever materialized. The band continued to perform at special events, most notably at Hit Giganten in 2004, until 2006. In 2005, the first (and only) single featuring Frank's vocals, "Sweat (A La La La La Long)", a cover of the Inner Circle hit, was released as an iTunes-only single. Another iTunes-only single was released by the band in 2006. This single, titled "Megamix 2006", blended each of the band's greatest hits into a single track.

Following the release of "Megamix 2006", the band quietly went into hiatus, although they performed a handful of times in 2007 and 2008. Word of their official separation came in 2008, when Lazy, Frank, and Haak announced that they would be parting ways. Since then, no plans for reuniting the band have been made. However, Lazy still performs at various '90s revival shows with different female vocalists, covering all of the Mr. President songs. T-Seven has her own solo discography and also occasionally performs at various '90s revival shows. All of the other former members of Mr. President have seemingly retired from the music business entirely.

=== LayZee formerly of Mr. President (2008–present) ===
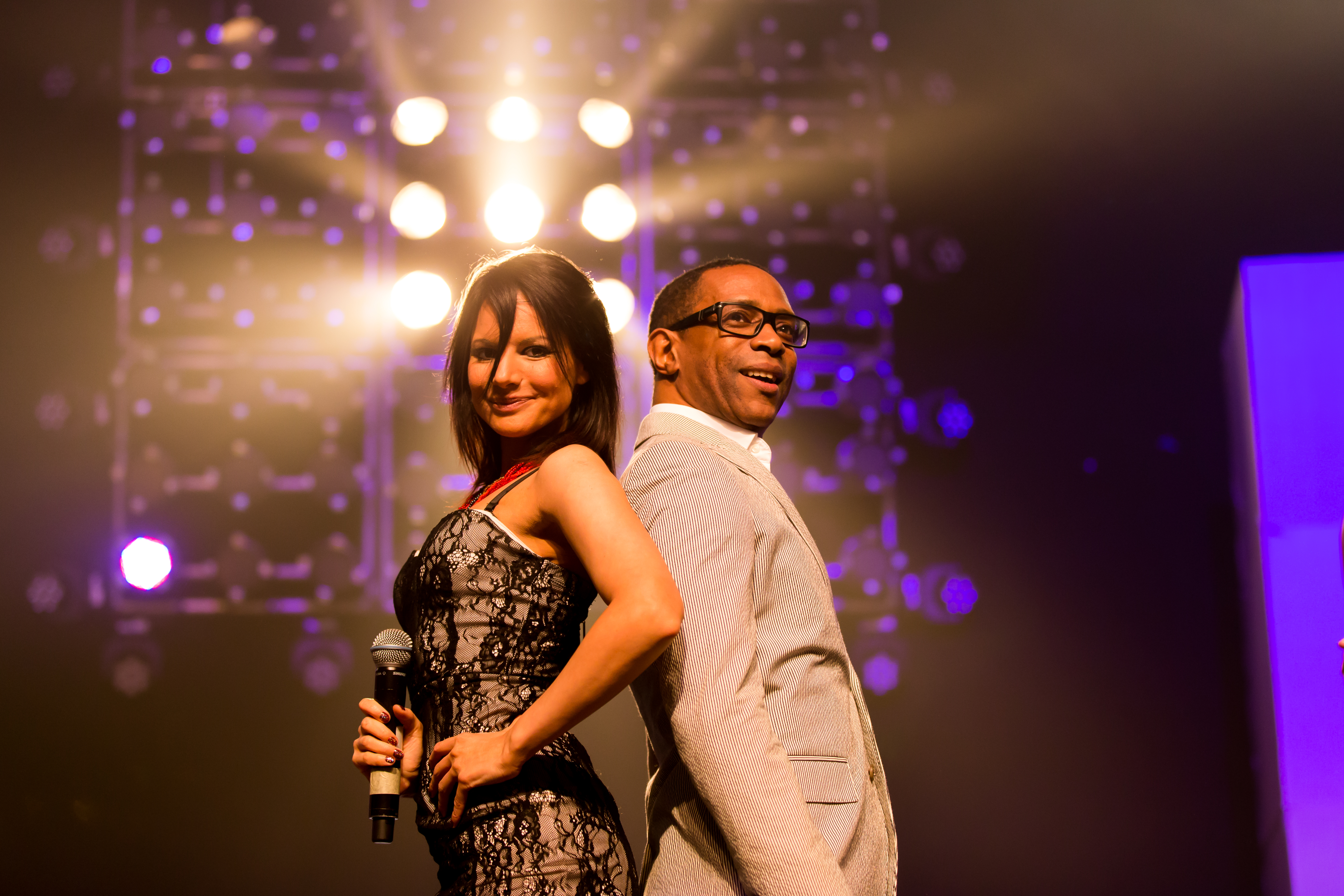
LayZee & Erika Kovács (2015)

Since 2008, Rennalls has continued to tour across Europe and South America as LayZee, formerly of Mr. President. In 2014, he recruited Hungarian-born singer Erika Kovács to join his live act. Today, Rennalls and Kovács continue to perform the Mr. President hits as a duo at concert venues worldwide. Rennalls has also released his own solo music, collaborating with other artists and running his independent label, DieZel Records. To date, he has released a total of seven solo singles, including "Tonight", "Summertime", "Copacabana", "Come On Everybody", and "Calling in Sick".

== Band line-up ==
- Lady Danii (Daniela Haak; 1991–2008)
- T-Seven (Judith Hildebrandt; 1991–2000)
- Sir Prophet (George Jones; 1991–1994)
- Lazy Dee (Delroy Rennalls; 1994–2008)
- Caren Miller (1994–1999) (ghost singer for T-Seven)
- Anne Schroeder (1994–1999) (ghost singer for Lady Danii)
- William King III (1995–2003) (ghost singer for Lazy Dee)
- Nadia Ayche (2001–2002)
- Myra (Myriam Beckmann; 2002–2003)
- Franzi (Franziska Frank; 2003–2008)

Timeline

== Discography ==
- Up'n Away – The Album (1995)
- We See the Same Sun (1996)
- Night Club (1997)
- Space Gate (1999)
- Forever & One Day (2003)
