= Coco Jamboo =

1996 single by Mr. President

Single by Mr. President

from the album We See the Same Sun
- Released: 29 March 1996
- Length: 3:39
- Label: WEA; Club Culture
- Songwriters: Kai Matthiesen; Delroy Rennalls; Rainer Gaffrey
- Producers: Kai Matthiesen; Rainer Gaffrey

Mr. President singles chronology
| "I'll Follow the Sun" (1995) | "Coco Jamboo" (1996) | "I Give You My Heart" (1996) |

Music video
- "Coco Jamboo" on YouTube

"Coco Jamboo" is a song by German Eurodance group Mr. President. It was released on 29 March 1996 by WEA and Club Culture as the lead single from their second studio album, We See the Same Sun (1996). The song was written by Kai Matthiesen and Rainer Gaffrey with group member Delroy Rennalls, and produced by Matthiesen and Gaffrey. Music critics compared it to Swedish band Ace of Base. The song became a hit across Europe.

"Coco Jamboo" reached number one in Austria, the Czech Republic, Hungary, Sweden, and Switzerland. It also experienced success in the United States and Latin America, peaking at number 21 on the US Billboard Hot 100 in September 1997. The accompanying music video, directed by John Buche, was filmed in Venezuela. Mr. President was awarded the German 1997 Echo award in the category for Best Dance Single with "Coco Jamboo".

== Critical reception ==
Scottish Aberdeen Evening Express described "Coco Jamboo" as "Ace of Base-style Euro-pop that has already done the business on the continent." Larry Flick from Billboard magazine wrote, "Once again, the European dance scene spawns a potential stateside smash. With its balmy bassline and spirited chorus, this single offers a way-familiar (but quite pleasant) pop/dancehall sound à la Ace of Base, but with a rugged hip-hop edge. The blend of wispy female vocals and throaty male rapping contributes to making this an easy programming bet."

A reviewer from Daily Record called it an "anonymous club 18 to 30s style anthem [that is] enjoying predictable summer success." Music Week gave the song a score of four out of five, adding, "We've loved this Ace Of Base-style summertime nursery rhyme ever since we heard it in Germany. It's unashamedly mainstream and is a guaranteed hit — if that is, radio can forget its current dislike of mainstream pop." Polish magazine Porcys listed "Coco Jamboo" at number 100 in their ranking of "100 Singles 1990–1999". They said, "Of course, summer is a season of banalities, but beautiful and joyful, and one of the functions of popular music is to enrich our gray lives with beauty and joy."

== Chart performance ==
"Coco Jamboo" peaked at number one in Austria, Czech Republic, Hungary, Latvia, Sweden and Switzerland. It was also a top-five hit in Denmark, Estonia, Finland, Germany, Ireland, the Netherlands, and Norway, as well as on the Eurochart Hot 100, where the single reached number four in July 1996. In the UK, it peaked at number eight in June 1997, spending two weeks at that position. Outside Europe, "Coco Jamboo" was successful in countries like Australia, New Zealand and Israel, where it reached numbers seven, nine and four. In the latter, it debuted as number five and peaked the following week, on 16 July and spent 6 weeks inside the top 30. On the US Billboard Hot 100, it peaked at number 21, becoming the band's only charting single. On the Billboard Dance Club Play chart, it reached number 17. In Latin America, it also reached number four in Mexico. The single was awarded with a gold record in Austria, New Zealand, Sweden and Switzerland (25,000). It also earned a silver record in the UK and a platinum record in Australia, Germany and Norway.

== Music video ==
The music video for "Coco Jamboo", released in April 1996, was directed by John Buche. It features the band's members walking on a beach and performing the song. It was filmed in Carúpano, a small city located in the Venezuelan coasts. The video specifically shows Playa Medina and Plaza Santa Rosa, two touristic places in Carúpano, and also part of the Carnival of Carúpano, one of the most iconic Carnivals in Venezuela. Buche would go on directing the videos for the group's next singles, "I Give You My Heart" and "Show Me the Way".

== Track listings ==
- 7-inch single – US (1996)

A. "Coco Jamboo" (Radio Edit) – 3:38
B. "Coco Jamboo" (C.C.'s R&B Mix) – 4:16

- 12-inch – Germany (1996)

A1. "Coco Jamboo" (Extended Version) – 5:42
A2. "Coco Jamboo" (Groove Version) – 6:02
A3. "Coco Jamboo" (Put It On Another Version) – 3:17
B1. "Coco Jamboo" (Mousse T.'s Extended Club Mix) – 6:15
B2. "Coco Jamboo" (Mousse T.'s Dangerous Dub) – 6:17
B3. "Coco Jamboo" (Mousse T.'s Instrumental Club Mix) – 6:15

- CD single – Europe (1996)
1. "Coco Jamboo" (Radio Version) – 3:37
2. "Coco Jamboo" (Extended Version) – 5:42
- CD single – US (1996)
1. "Coco Jamboo" (Radio Edit) – 3:38
2. "Coco Jamboo" (C.C.'s R&B Mix) – 4:16
- CD maxi – Europe (1996)
1. "Coco Jamboo" (Radio Version) – 3:37
2. "Coco Jamboo" (Extended Version) – 5:42
3. "Coco Jamboo" (Groove Version) – 6:02
4. "Coco Jamboo" (Mousse T.'s Club Mix – Radio Edit) – 3:10
5. "Coco Jamboo" (Mousse T.'s Extended Club Mix) – 6:15
6. "Coco Jamboo" (Mousse T.'s Dangerous Dub) – 6:17
7. "Coco Jamboo" (Instrumental Version) – 3:33
8. "Coco Jamboo" (Put In On Another Version) – 3:17
- CD maxi Remixes – Europe (1996)
1. "Coco Jamboo" (C. C.'s R & B Mix) – 4:14
2. "Coco Jamboo" (Chico Y Chico Tribal Radio Mix) – 3:42
3. "Coco Jamboo" (Candy Club Remix) – 5:46
4. "Coco Jamboo" (Candy Club's Ragga Jump) – 5:03
5. "Coco Jamboo" (Chico Y Chico Tribal Remix) – 6:36
6. "Coco Jamboo" (Original Radio Version) – 3:38

== Charts ==
=== Weekly charts ===
| Chart (1996–1997) | Peak position |
|---|---|
| Australia (ARIA) | 7 |
| Austria (Ö3 Austria Top 40) | 1 |
| Belgium (Ultratop 50 Flanders) | 11 |
| Belgium (Ultratop 50 Wallonia) | 17 |
| Canada Top Singles (RPM) | 37 |
| Canada Dance/Urban (RPM) | 15 |
| Czech Republic (IFPI CR) | 1 |
| Denmark (IFPI) | 4 |
| Estonia (Eesti Top 20) | 2 |
| Europe (Eurochart Hot 100) | 4 |
| Europe (European Dance Radio) | 9 |
| Europe (European Hit Radio) | 21 |
| Finland (Suomen virallinen lista) | 3 |
| France (SNEP) | 28 |
| Germany (GfK) | 2 |
| Hungary (Mahasz) | 1 |
| Iceland (Íslenski Listinn Topp 40) | 24 |
| Ireland (IRMA) | 3 |
| Israel (Israeli Singles Chart) | 4 |
| Latvia (Latvijas Top 50) | 1 |
| Mexico (Notitas Musicales) | 4 |
| Netherlands (Dutch Top 40) | 2 |
| Netherlands (Single Top 100) | 3 |
| New Zealand (Recorded Music NZ) | 9 |
| Norway (VG-lista) | 2 |
| Quebec (ADISQ) | 39 |
| Scottish Singles Sales (Official Charts) | 9 |
| Sweden (Sverigetopplistan) | 1 |
| Switzerland (Schweizer Hitparade) | 1 |
| UK Singles (Official Charts) | 8 |
| UK Dance (Official Charts) | 20 |
| UK Pop Tip Club Chart (Music Week) | 13 |
| US Billboard Hot 100 | 21 |
| US Dance Club Play (Billboard) | 17 |
| US Rhythmic Top 40 (Billboard) | 26 |
| US Top 40/Mainstream (Billboard) | 17 |

| Chart (2025) | Peak position |
|---|---|
| Lithuania Airplay (TopHit) | 59 |

=== Year-end charts ===
| Chart (1996) | Position |
|---|---|
| Austria (Ö3 Austria Top 40) | 7 |
| Belgium (Ultratop 50 Flanders) | 69 |
| Belgium (Ultratop 50 Wallonia) | 94 |
| Europe (Eurochart Hot 100) | 14 |
| France (SNEP) | 91 |
| Germany (Media Control) | 8 |
| Israel (Israeli Singles Chart) | 12 |
| Latvia (Latvijas Top 50) | 25 |
| Netherlands (Dutch Top 40) | 24 |
| Netherlands (Single Top 100) | 26 |
| Norway (VG-lista) | 11 |
| Sweden (Topplistan) | 6 |
| Switzerland (Schweizer Hitparade) | 7 |

| Chart (1997) | Position |
|---|---|
| Australia (ARIA) | 24 |
| New Zealand (RIANZ) | 24 |
| UK Singles (OCC) | 53 |
| US Billboard Hot 100 | 92 |
| US Top 40/Mainstream (Billboard) | 68 |

| Chart (1998) | Position |
|---|---|
| Australia (ARIA) | 86 |

=== Decade-end charts ===
| Chart (1990–1999) | Rank |
|---|---|
| Austria (Ö3 Austria Top 40) | 93 |

== Certifications and sales ==
| Region | Certification | Certified units/sales |
|---|---|---|
| Australia (ARIA) | Platinum | 70,000^{^} |
| Austria (IFPI Austria) | Gold | 25,000^{*} |
| Denmark (IFPI Danmark) | Platinum | 90,000^{‡} |
| Germany (BVMI) | Platinum | 500,000^{^} |
| New Zealand (RMNZ) | Gold | 5,000^{*} |
| Norway (IFPI Norway) | Platinum | |
| Sweden (GLF) | Gold | 25,000^{^} |
| Switzerland (IFPI Switzerland) | Gold | 25,000^{^} |
| United Kingdom (BPI) | Silver | 200,000^{^} |
^{*} Sales figures based on certification alone.^{^} Shipments figures based on certification alone.^{‡} Sales+streaming figures based on certification alone.

== Release history ==
| Region | Date | Format(s) | Label(s) | Ref. |
|---|---|---|---|---|
| Germany | 29 March 1996 | CD | WEA; Club Culture | |
| Japan | 10 February 1997 | CD | WEA; Club Culture | |
| United Kingdom | 2 June 1997 | 12-inch vinyl; CD; cassette | WEA | |
| United States | 17 June 1997 | Rhythmic contemporary; contemporary hit radio | Warner Bros. | |

== Christmas version ==
During the 1996 holiday season, a Christmas-themed version of "Coco Jamboo" was released by the band, featuring new lyrics and festive instruments. It is currently viewable on YouTube.

== Cover versions ==
Romanian performer Inna recorded a song called "Rendez Vous" for her fourth studio album, Inna (2015), which samples elements from the recording.

Israeli singer Netta Barzilai performed a cover of the song for the first episode of her YouTube show Netta's Office.
