= Heringen, Thuringia =

Heringen
- Town
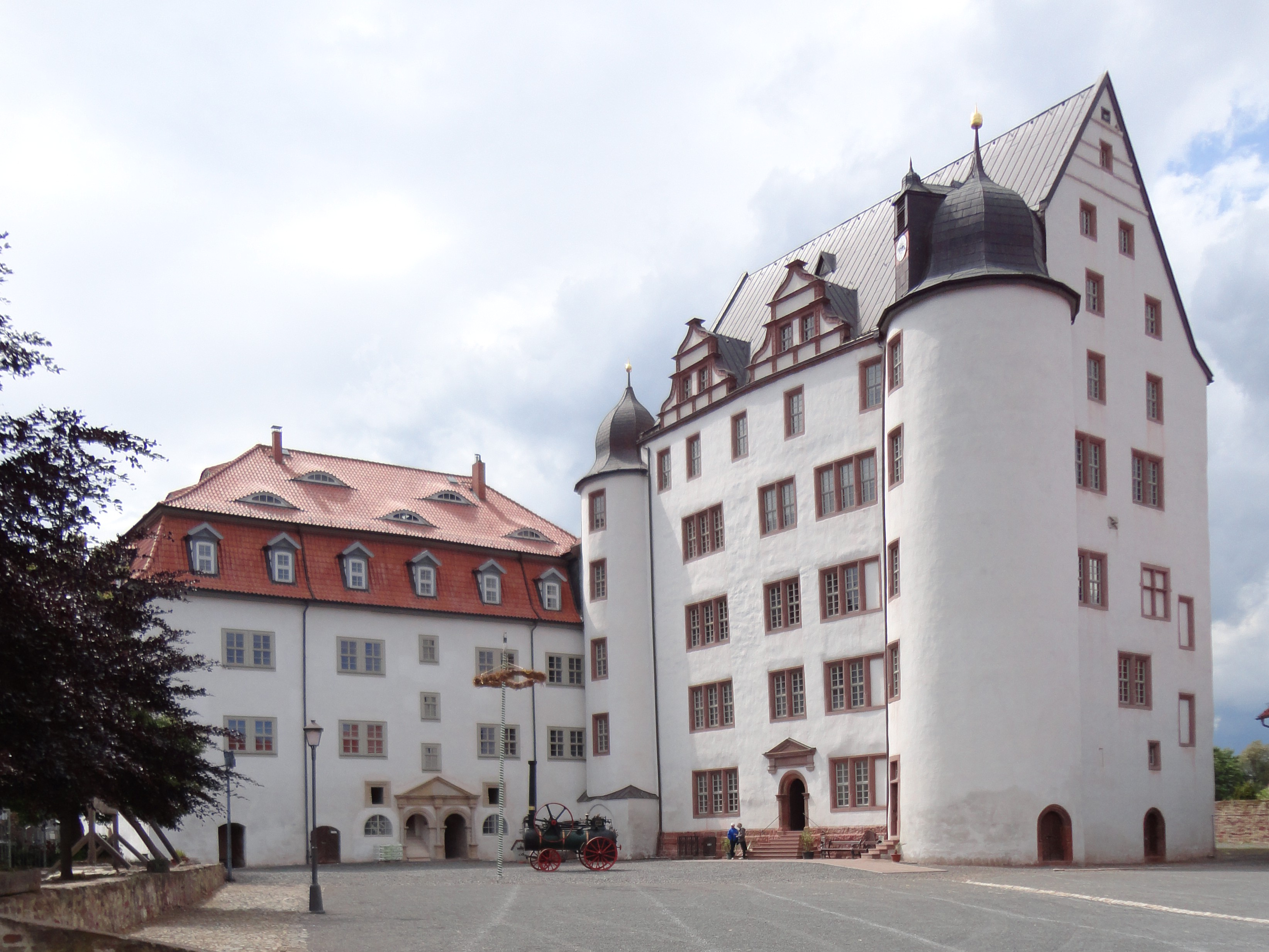
- Castle of Heringen

- Coat of arms

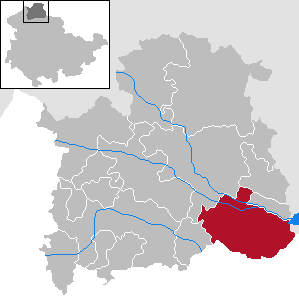
- Location of Heringen within Nordhausen district
- Interactive map of Heringen
- Location within Germany Location within Thuringia
- Coordinates: 51°26′50″N 10°52′51″E
- Country: Germany
- State: Thuringia
- District: Nordhausen

Government
  - Mayor (2023–29): Matthias Marquardt (Left)

Area
  - Total: 66.91 km^{2} (25.83 sq mi)
- Elevation: 162 m (531 ft)

Population (2025-12-31)
  - Total: 4,474
  - Density: 66.87/km^{2} (173.2/sq mi)
- Time zone: UTC+01:00 (CET)
  - Summer (DST): UTC+02:00 (CEST)
- Postal codes: 99765
- Dialling codes: 036333
- Vehicle registration: NDH
- Website: www.stadt-heringen.de

Heringen (German pronunciation: [ˈheːʁɪŋən]; also: Heringen/Helme in order to distinguish from Heringen in Hesse) is a town in the district of Nordhausen, in Thuringia, Germany. It is situated on the small river Helme, 8 km southeast of Nordhausen.

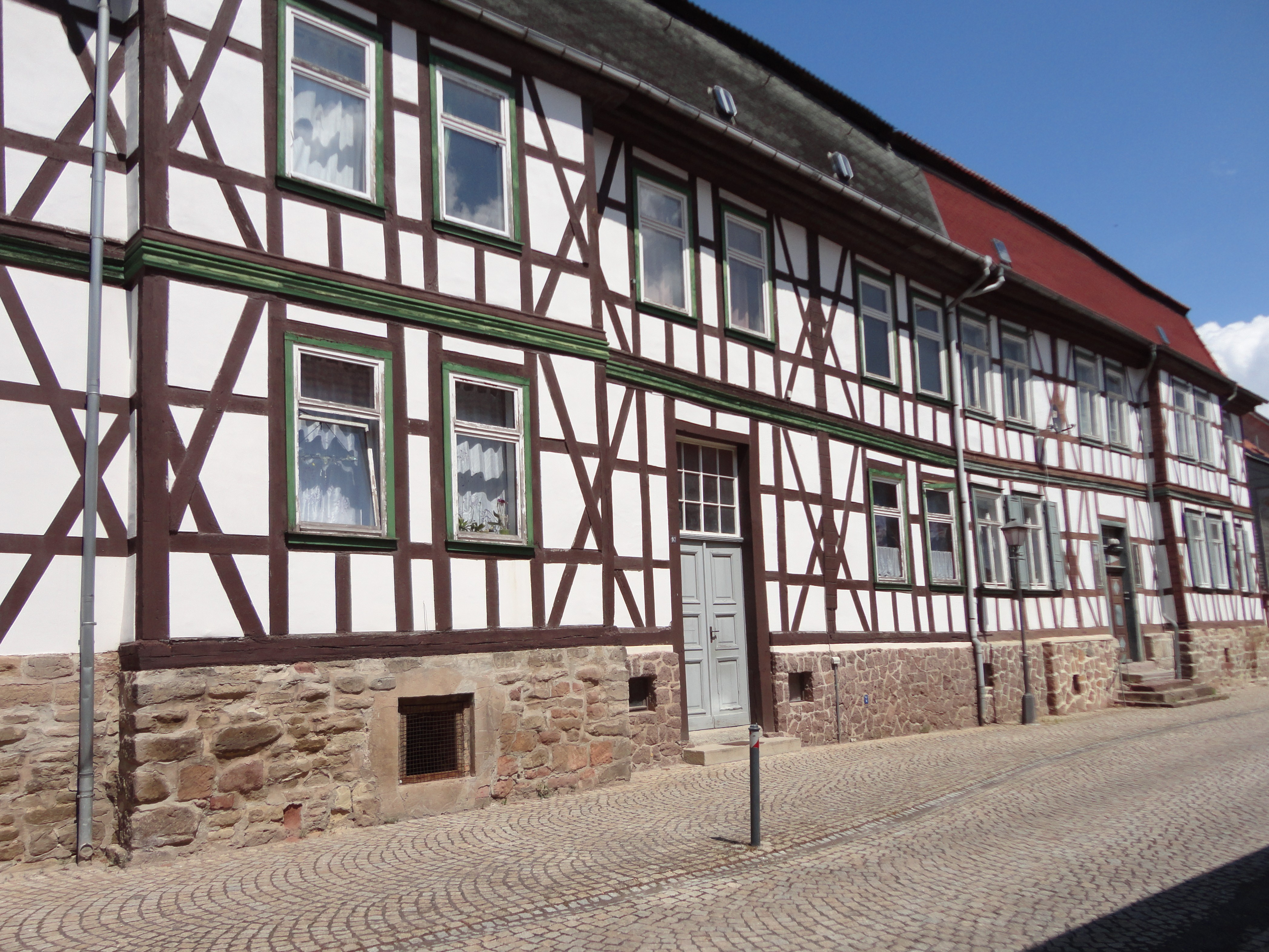
Heringen

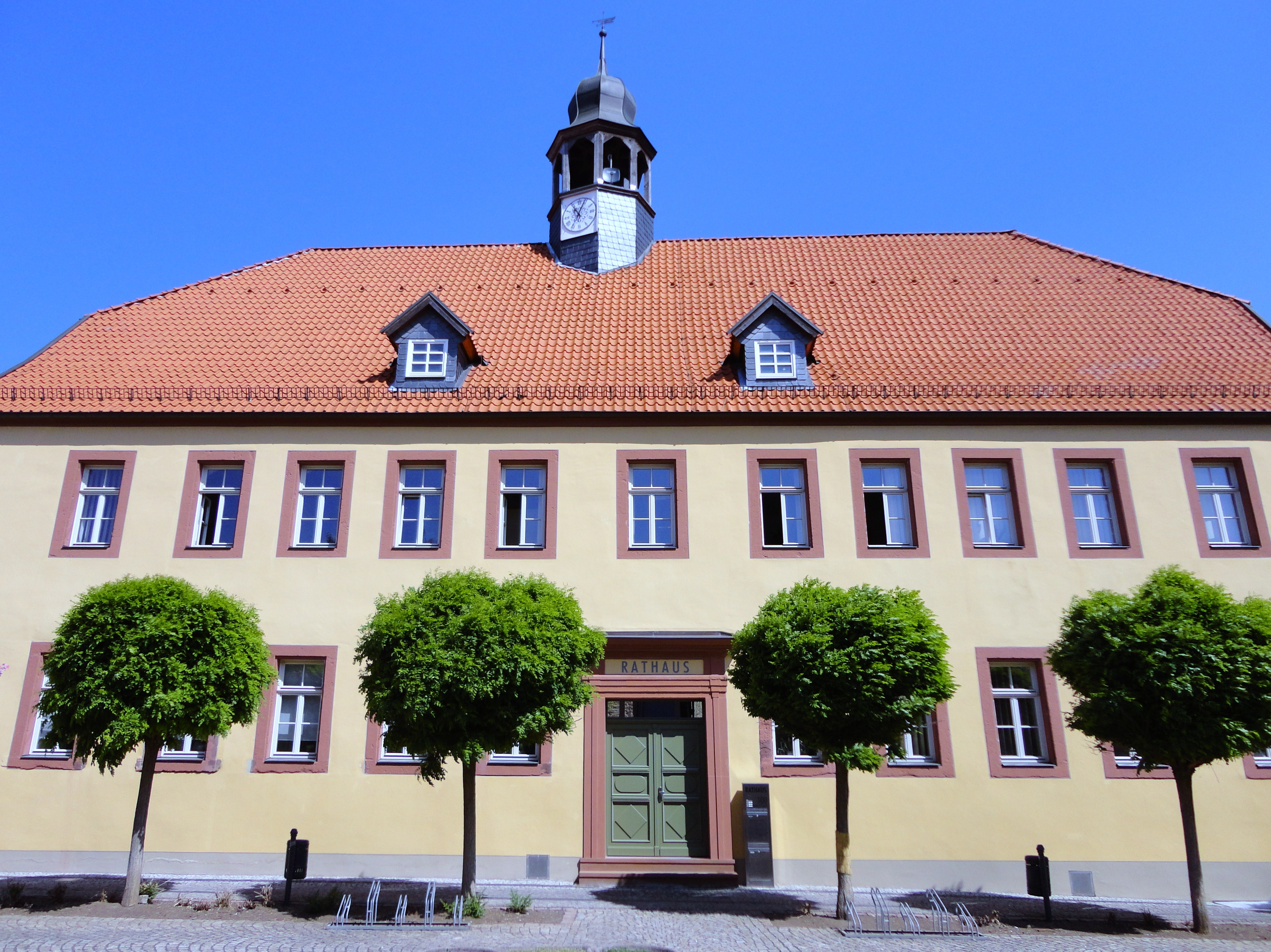
Town hall of Heringen

== Notable people ==
- Hermann Hendrich (1854-1931), painter

== Buildings ==
In the northwestern part of Old Heringen is the Heringen Castle. It was to be destroyed in the 1960s and was renovated from 2003 to 2014.
