= Alter Stolberg =

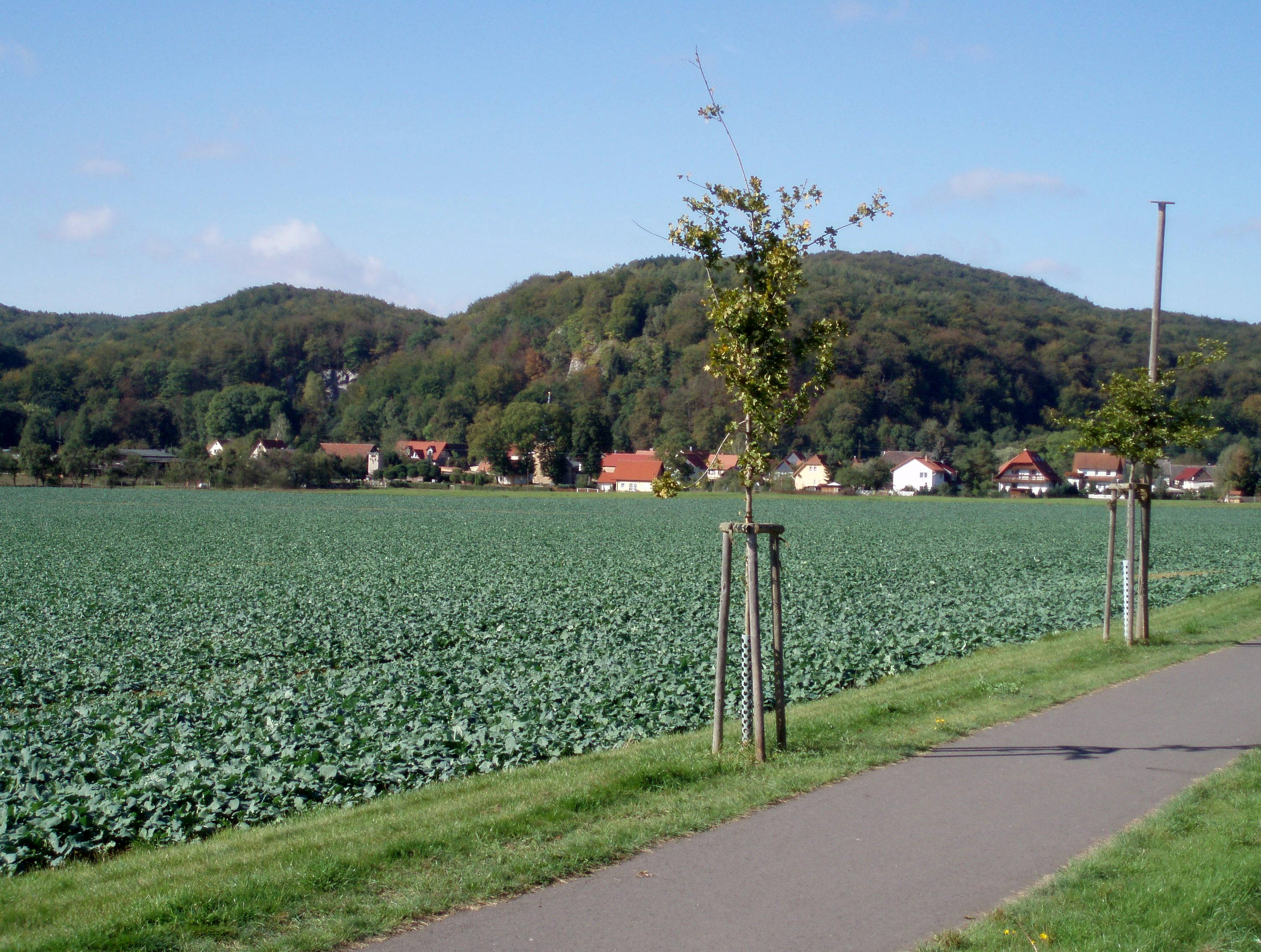
- Stempeda at the foot of the Alter Stolberg

Highest point
- Peak: Königskopf
- Elevation: 357.7 m above NN

Geography
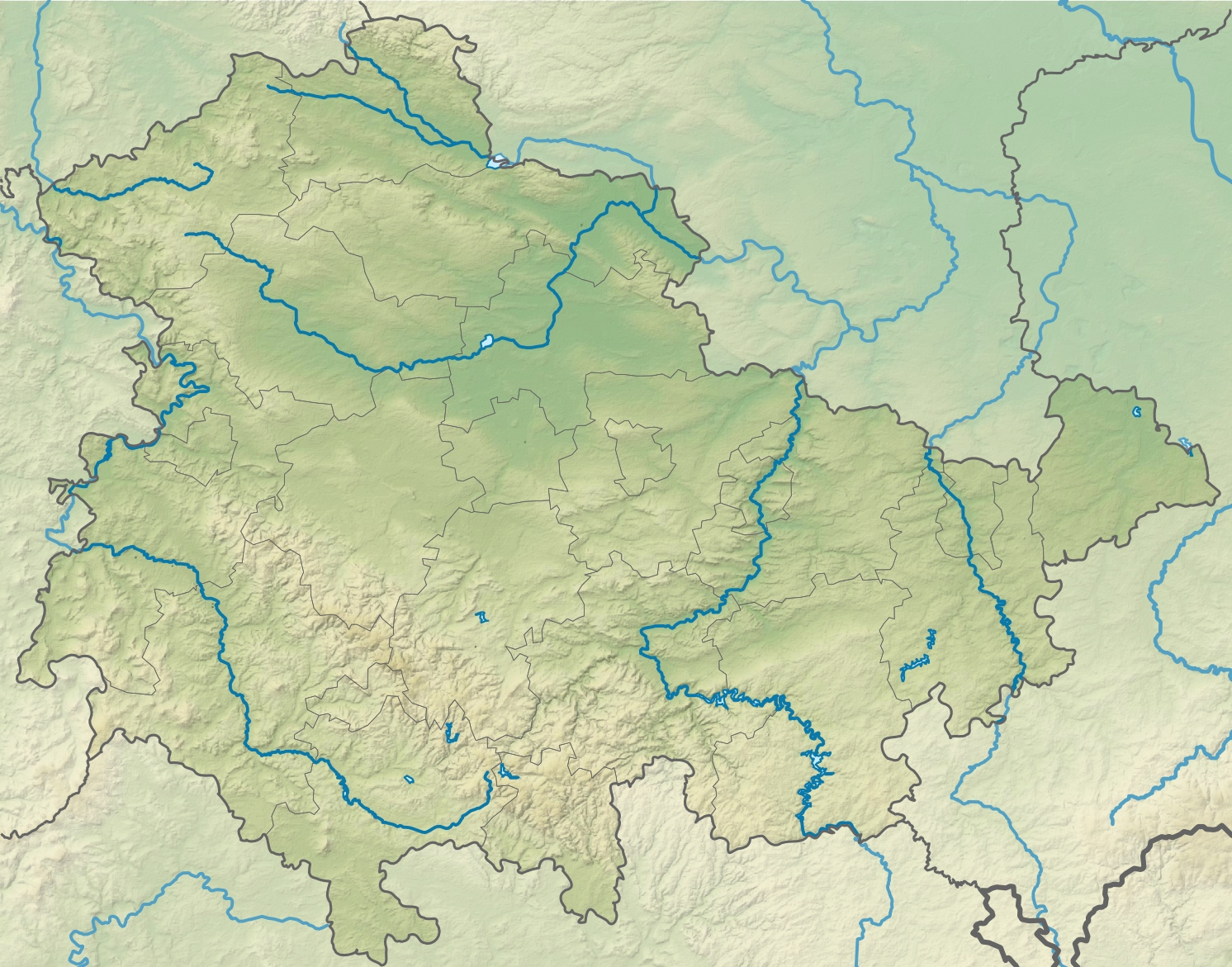
- Location within Thuringia
- Location: South Harz
- Country: Germany
- Range coordinates: 51°31′36″N 10°54′31″E
- Parent range: South Harz Zechstein Belt, Thuringian Basin

The Alter Stolberg is a wooded karst plateau, up to 357.7 m above sea level (NN), in the South Harz in Central Germany. It lies in the districts of Nordhausen in the state of Thuringia and Mansfeld-Südharz in the state of Saxony-Anhalt.

== Geographical location ==
The ridge of the Alter Stolberg is part of the South Harz Zechstein belt and lies mainly in Thuringia; with its eastern foothills dropping into the valley of the Krebsbach stream and Thyra river. To the north is the Harz; to the south the Goldene Aue through which the River Helme flows.

The Alter Stolberg lies between the following parishes in clockwise order: Görsbach and Urbach to the south, Leimbach and Steigerthal to the west, Buchholz and Herrmannsacker to northwest, Stempeda and − on the other sides of that − Rodishain to the north (all in Thuringia) and the Saxony-Anhalt villages of Rottleberode and Uftrungen to the east.

The highest hill in the Alter Stolberg is the Königskopf (357.7 m above sea level (NN)) which rises in the northern part of the ridge. Another prominent hill is the Reesberg (325.2 m above NN) in the southeastern part.

== Points of interest ==
The northern part of the heavily forested ridge is designated as the Alter Stolberg Nature Reserve and large parts of it as the Alter Stolberg Protected Landscape.

Near the Reesberg is the plaster cave, known as Heimkehle. In addition, the ridge is home to the ruins of the Grasburg, a medieval refuge castle, which legend has it was the family castle of the Counts of Stolberg.
