= Grasburg (Rottleberode) =

Prehistoric refuge castle in Saxony-Anhalt, Germany

Coordinates: 51°31′06.0″N 10°56′05.6″E

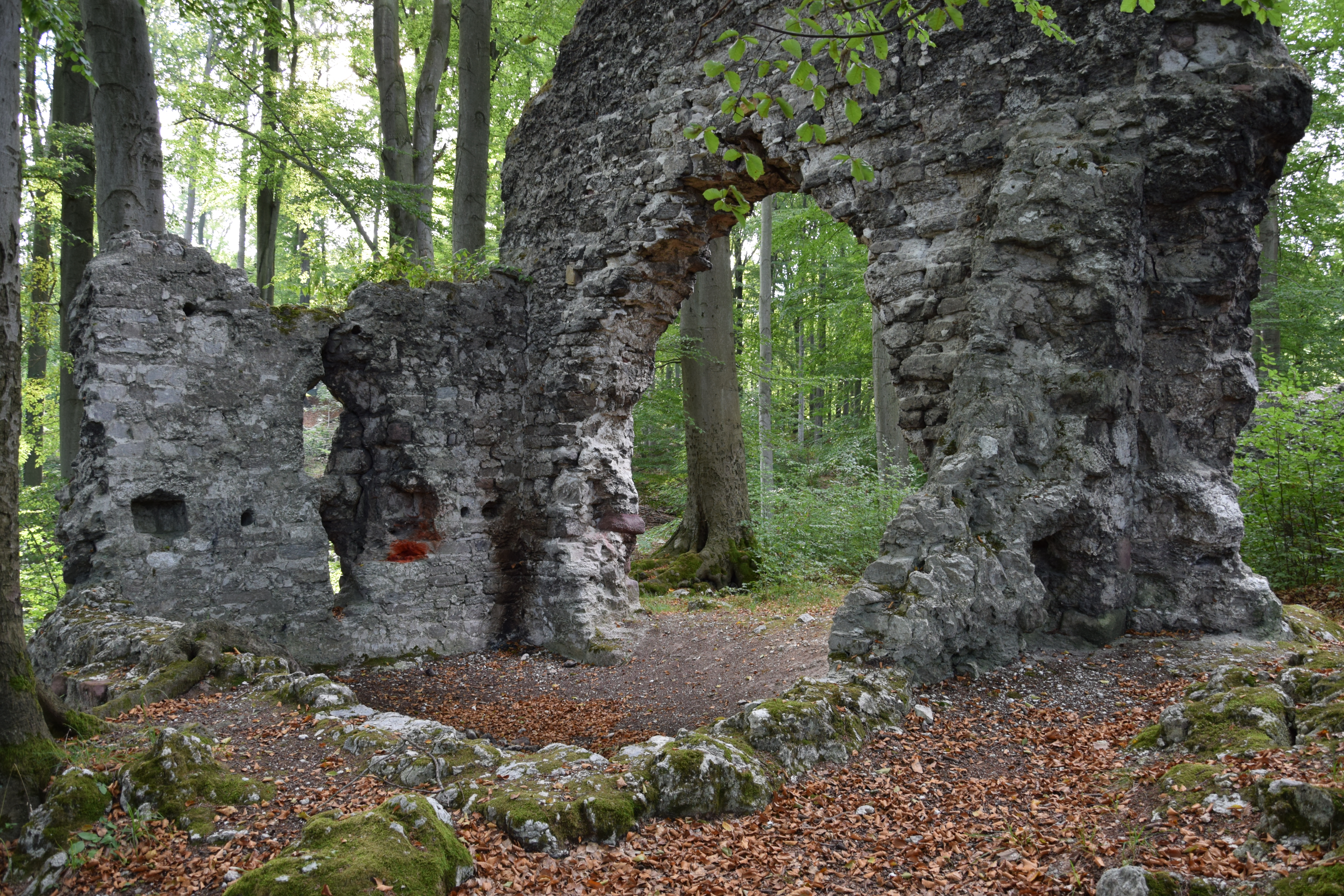
Ruins of Grasburg

The Grasburg is a prehistoric refuge castle, in the form of a hillfort with a rampart and ditch system, near Rottleberode in the district of Mansfeld-Südharz in the German state of Saxony-Anhalt.

== History ==
The Grasburg is located in the wooded area known as Alter Stolberg between Stempeda and Rottleberode in the South Harz and is, according to legend, the family seat of the counts of Stolberg. There are various theories about the ancestry of the counts of Stolberg, none of which has been able to prevail.

In the 13th century a pilgrimage chapel was built in the castle grounds, in which an annual fair was celebrated up to the 15th century. Such a ceremony was held on St. Stephen's Day (3 August), for example, in 1497 on the Craßburg. Thereafter, the chapel fell into ruin; although several elements of it have survived.
