= Barbara Rinke =

German politician

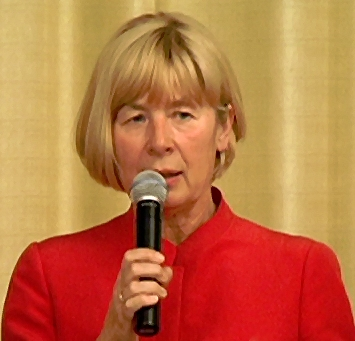
- Barbara Rinke in 2009
- Born: 8 January 1947 (age 79); Nordhausen, Thuringia, Germany
- Occupation: politician

Barbara Rinke (born 8 January 1947) is a German politician of the Social Democratic Party. She was born in Nordhausen, Thuringia, and was Bürgermeister of that city from 1994 to 2012. From 2003 to 2009, she was the praeses of the synod of the Evangelical Church in Germany (EKD).

== Honors ==
- 2005: Order of Merit of the Federal Republic of Germany (Officer's Cross, or Merit Cross 1st Class)
