= Nordhausen University of Applied Sciences =

Coordinates: 51.4978°N 10.8164°E

- Hochschule Nordhausen
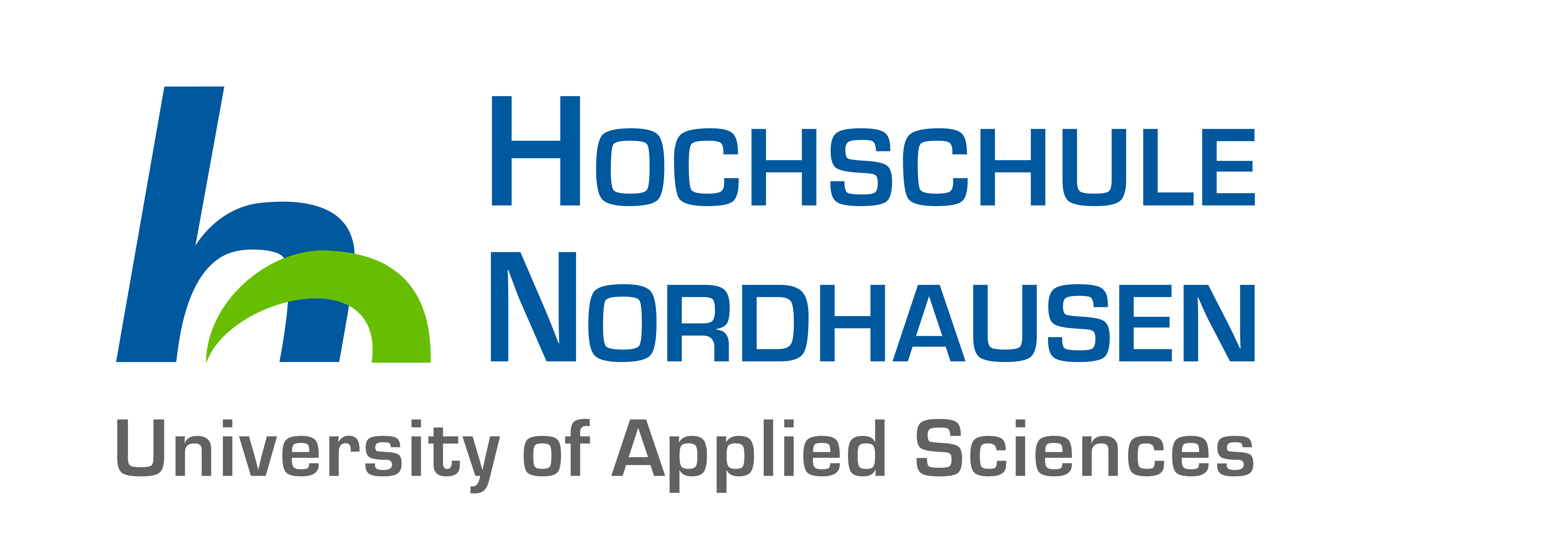
- Type: Fachhochschule
- Established: 1997; 29 years ago
- President: Jörg Wagner
- Faculty: 50
- Students: 1,983
- Location: Nordhausen, Thuringia, Germany
- Campus: Urban
- Website: www.hs-nordhausen.de

The Nordhausen University of Applied Sciences (German: Hochschule Nordhausen) is located in Nordhausen, Thuringia, Germany. Established in 1997 after reunification of Germany, as of 2025 the Hochschule has 1,983 students enrolled and 42 professors. It offers Bachelor's and Master's degrees in business administration, public management, and business engineering, among others.
