= Rodishain =

- Village of Nordhausen
- Interactive map of Rodishain
- Location within Germany Location within Thuringia
- Coordinates: 51°31′N 10°55′E
- Country: Germany
- State: Thuringia
- District: Nordhausen
- Town: Nordhausen

Area
  - Total: 2.32 km^{2} (0.90 sq mi)
- Elevation: 255 m (837 ft)

Population (2006-12-31)
  - Total: 283
  - Density: 122/km^{2} (316/sq mi)
- Time zone: UTC+01:00 (CET)
  - Summer (DST): UTC+02:00 (CEST)
- Postal codes: 99762
- Dialling codes: 034653

Rodishain is a former municipality in the district of Nordhausen, in Thuringia, Germany. Since 1 December 2007, it is part of the town Nordhausen.
