= Buchholz, Thuringia =

Buchholz
- Stadtteil of Nordhausen
- Interactive map of Buchholz
- Location within Germany Location within Thuringia
- Coordinates: 51°31′N 10°52′E
- Country: Germany
- State: Thuringia
- District: Nordhausen
- Town: Nordhausen

Area
  - Total: 2.62 km^{2} (1.01 sq mi)
- Elevation: 320 m (1,050 ft)

Population (2016-12-31)
  - Total: 213
  - Density: 81.3/km^{2} (211/sq mi)
- Time zone: UTC+01:00 (CET)
  - Summer (DST): UTC+02:00 (CEST)
- Postal codes: 99762
- Dialling codes: 03631

Buchholz (German pronunciation: [ˈbuːxhɔlts]) is a village and a former municipality in the district of Nordhausen, in Thuringia, Germany. Since July 2018, it is part of the town Nordhausen.
