= Urbach, Thuringia =

Town in Thuringia, Germany

Urbach
- Town
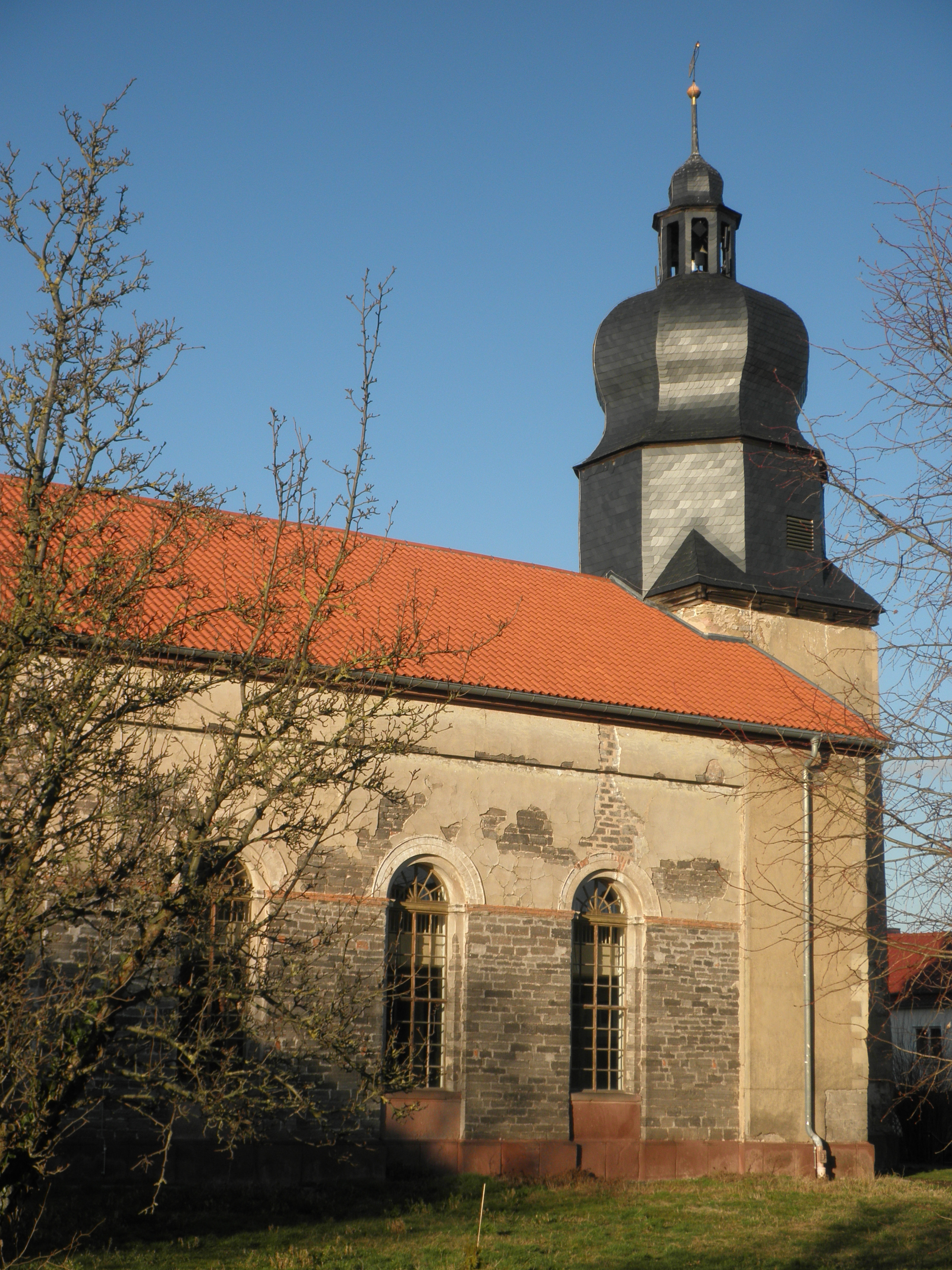
- Church of Saint John

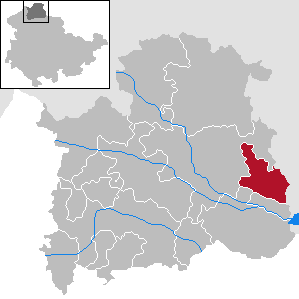
- Location of Urbach within Nordhausen district
- Interactive map of Urbach
- Location within Germany Location within Thuringia
- Coordinates: 51°28′48″N 10°54′03″E
- Country: Germany
- State: Thuringia
- District: Nordhausen
- First mentioned: 874 (1152 years ago)

Government
  - Mayor (2022–28): Markus Volkmann (CDU)

Area
  - Total: 26.53 km^{2} (10.24 sq mi)
- Elevation: 180 m (590 ft)

Population (2025-12-31)
  - Total: 866
  - Density: 32.6/km^{2} (84.5/sq mi)
- Time zone: UTC+01:00 (CET)
  - Summer (DST): UTC+02:00 (CEST)
- Postal codes: 99765
- Dialling codes: 036333
- Vehicle registration: NDH

Urbach (German pronunciation: [ˈuːɐ̯bax]) is a town in the district of Nordhausen, in Thuringia, Germany. The town of Urbach was first mentioned in 874, when Ludwig the German granted the Fulda monastery the right to tithes.
