= Walkenried Abbey =

Monastery

Coordinates: 51°34′59″N 10°37′09″E

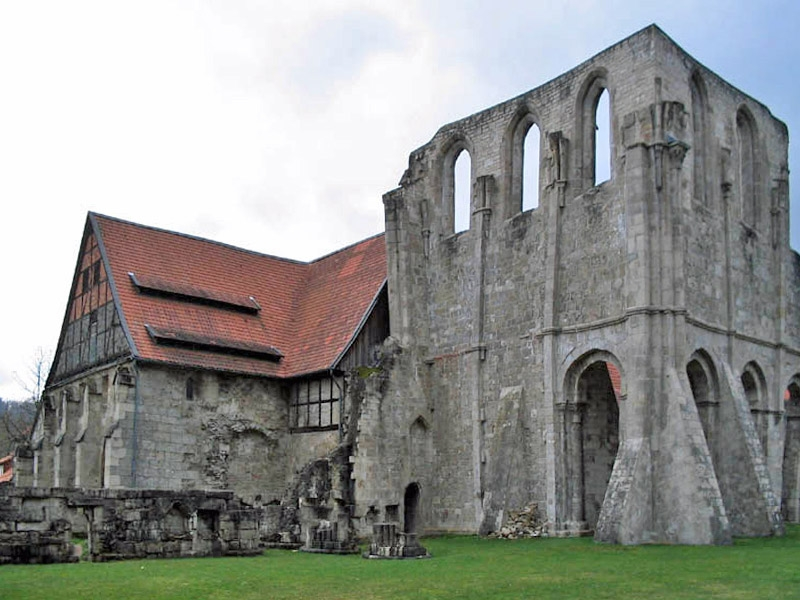
- Former chapter house and abbey church ruins
- Interactive map of Walkenried Abbey

Monastery information
- Order: Cistercian
- Established: 1127

Site
- Location: Walkenried, Germany

Walkenried Abbey (German: Kloster Walkenried) was a Cistercian abbey located in the village of Walkenried in Lower Saxony, Germany. Founded in 1127 on the southern rim of the Harz mountain range, the remnants of the monastic complex since 2010 are part of the Upper Harz Water Regale World Heritage Site.

== History ==
The third Cistercian monastery on German territory was founded by Adelheid of Lare (Lohra), wife of Count Volkmar of Klettenberg, under the first abbot Henry I (1127–28); the foundation was backed by King Lothair III and confirmed in 1137 by Pope Innocent II. The constituent convent arrived in 1129 from Kamp Abbey in the Rhineland, where Adelheid had stayed on a pilgrimage. The premises were conveniently situated on the Wieda creek and the southern slopes of the Harz mountains. Shortly afterwards construction work of a Romanesque basilica began, which was dedicated in 1137. Two Cistercian daughter houses were founded: Pforta (Sancta Maria ad Portam, 1137) near Naumburg and Sittichenbach Abbey (1141) near Eisleben in the County of Mansfeld.

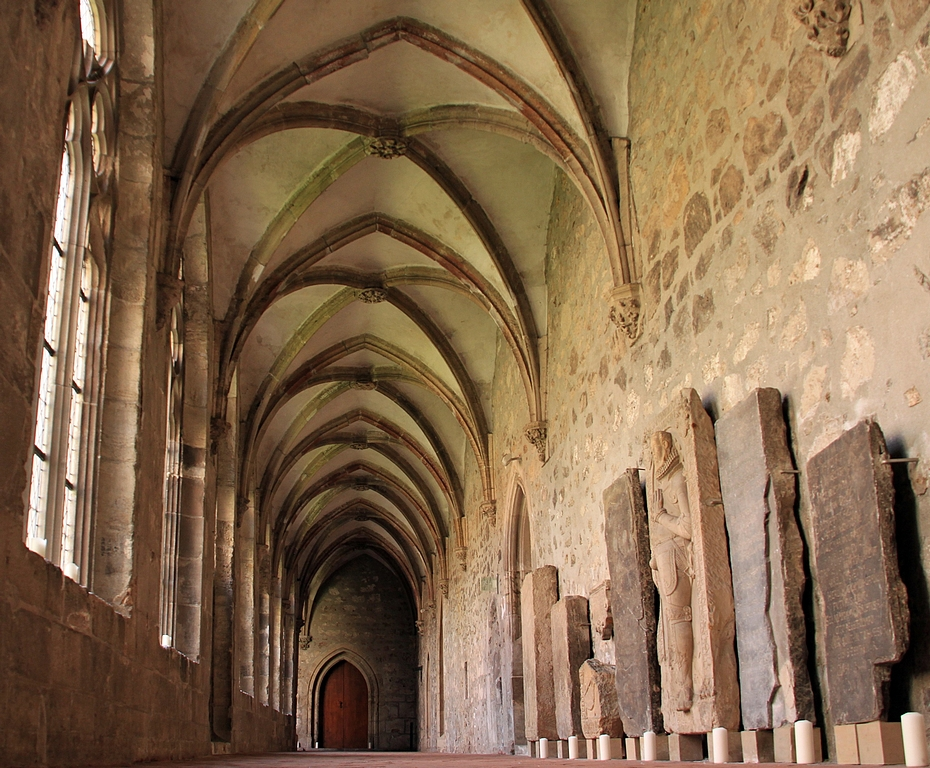
Cloister with tombstones

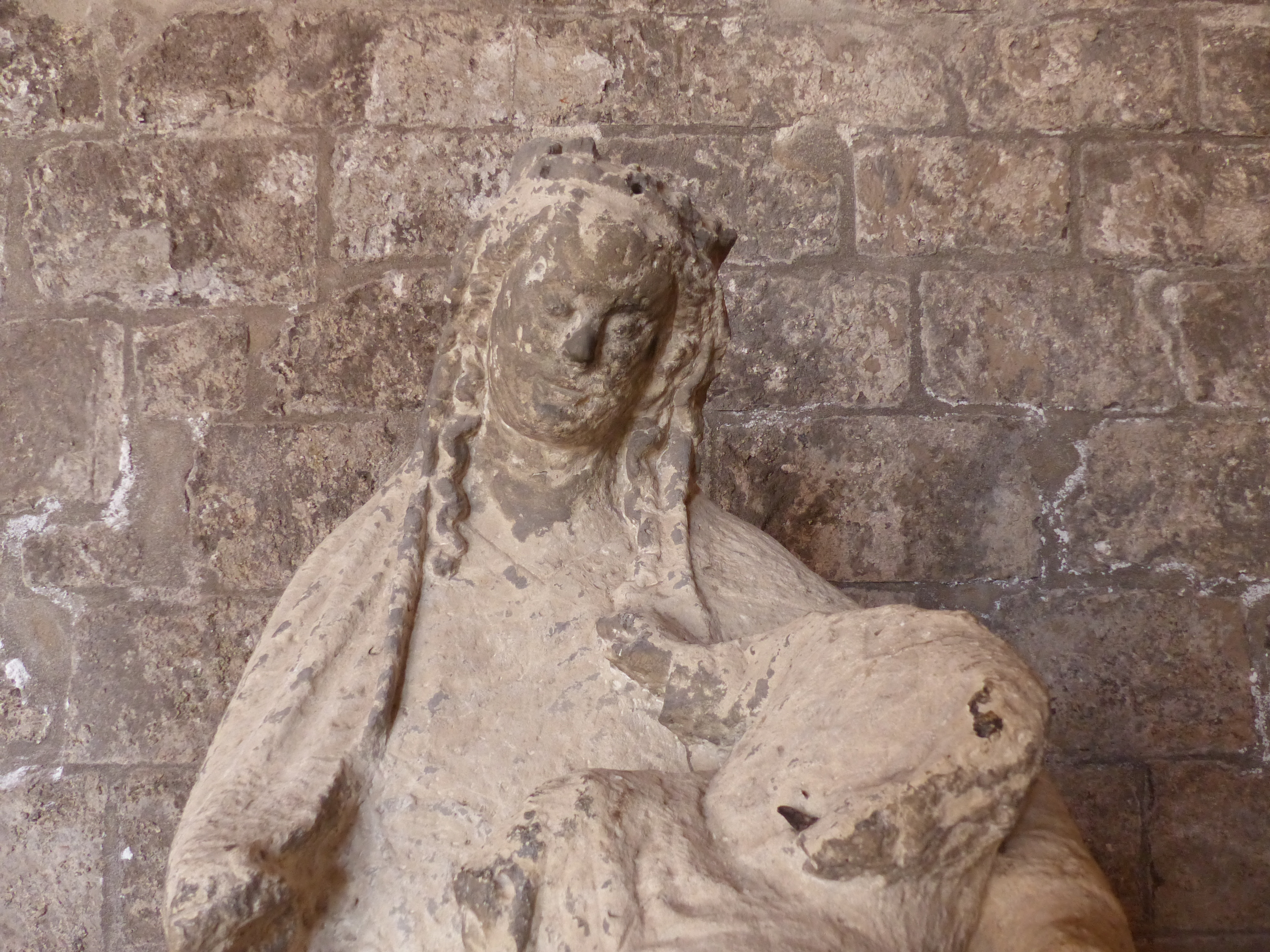
Gothic Madonna figure in the cloister of Walkenried Abbey

Walkenried grew rich and acquired lands as far away as the Rhineland and Pomerania. The monks gave much attention to land clearance and development, especially mining, smelting and charcoal works, and also the construction of fishponds. They used the Upper Harz water management system to cultivate the surrounding estates along the Helme river down to Thuringia, which are today called Goldene Aue. The abbey also held a library, where the 14th-century flagellant and millenarian Konrad Schmid, though a layman, educated himself. In the 13th century, about 100 monks and more than 200 lay brothers lived in the abbey, which became one of the most affluent and significant Cistercian monasteries in Germany. In 1209 the erection of a new basilica modelled on Morimond Abbey began, supported by Emperor Otto IV. The church, then one of the largest in Northern Germany, and the adjacent cloister were finished in a Gothic style and consecrated by Bishop Siegfried II of Hildesheim in 1290. The Counts of Klettenberg held the office of a Vogt (reeve), which upon their extinction about 1260 passed to the Counts of Hohnstein.

When in the mid 14th century plague epidemics depopulated the Harz region, both the mining in the Upper Harz and the agricultural business stagnated and the abbey began to decline. In the early 16th century, the premises were settled by only 12 monks and the abbot. The German Peasants' War brought the monastery to the verge of destruction, when on Easter 1525, a mob of about 800 peasants from the southern Harz region marched against Walkenried. Abbot Paulus (1520–36) and the monks fled, taking the archives with them. The abbey was plundered and the church spire torn down, severely damaging the underlying crossing vault.

In view of the Protestant Reformation the abbey was finally declared an immediate Reichsstift (Imperial abbey) by Emperor Charles V in 1542. Nevertheless, the next abbot, John VIII (1530–59), was very worldly and extravagant; in 1546 he and his monks turned Lutheran. Thereupon Count Ernst of Hohnstein, as patron of the abbey, laid a complaint before the Habsburg emperor, who in 1548 ordered that everything in the abbey should be restored to its former condition, but his command was unheeded. After the count's death the entire County of Hohnstein became Protestant, and in 1556, a Latin school was opened at Walkenried. Four Lutheran abbots directed the abbey until 1578 when the Count of Hohnstein appointed his son as administrator, after whose death in 1593 the Halberstadt cathedral chapter left the administration of Hohnstein and Walkenried Abbey to the Princes of Brunswick-Wolfenbüttel.

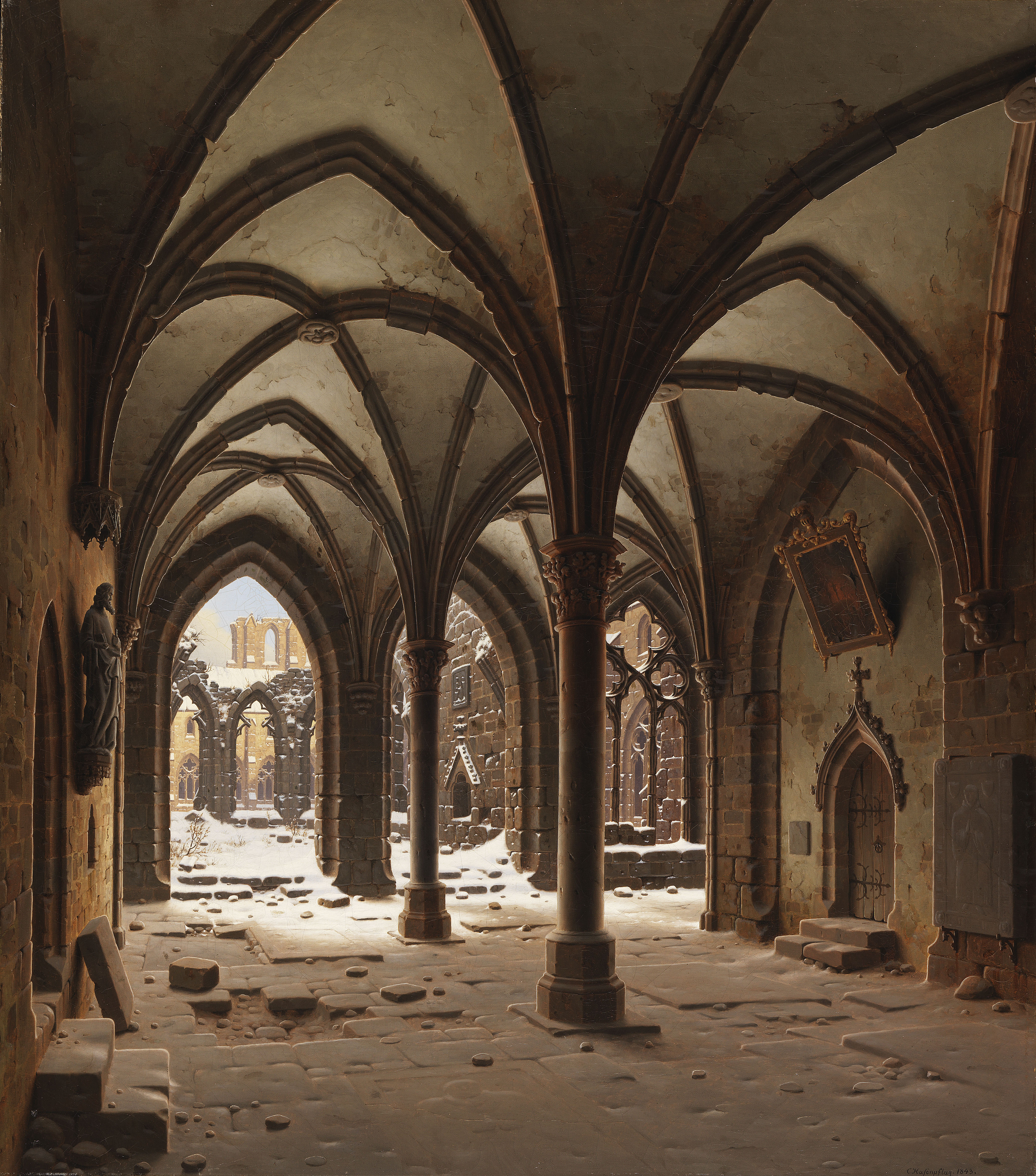
Walkenried ruins in winter, Romantic painting by Carl Hasenpflug, 1843

During the Thirty Years' War the abbey was for a short time (1629–31) restored to the Cistercians. The 1648 Peace of Westphalia put an end to the existence of the Protestant monastery and the abbey was secularised. In 1668, the Latin school was closed. The Wolfenbüttel dukes ruled the former abbey's estates within an incorporated Amt also comprising the neighbouring villages of Zorge and Hohegeiß.

From that time the abbey was systematically quarried as a source of building stone. The Gothic church was greatly damaged since the destruction of the roof tower by the peasants in 1525; today only a few picturesque remains are still in existence. The library was also destroyed by the peasants, but the archives are preserved at the Herzog August Library in Wolfenbüttel. Otherwise, however the claustral buildings are generally well preserved. The chapter hall has served since 1570 as a Lutheran church. The demolition of the buildings was stopped in 1817, first comprehensive works to renovate the cloister started in 1876. Since 1977 the premises are managed by the Osterode district authorities; a museum opened in 2006.
