= Neuhof Substation =

110 IV substation in Neuhof, Bad Sachsa, Lower Saxony

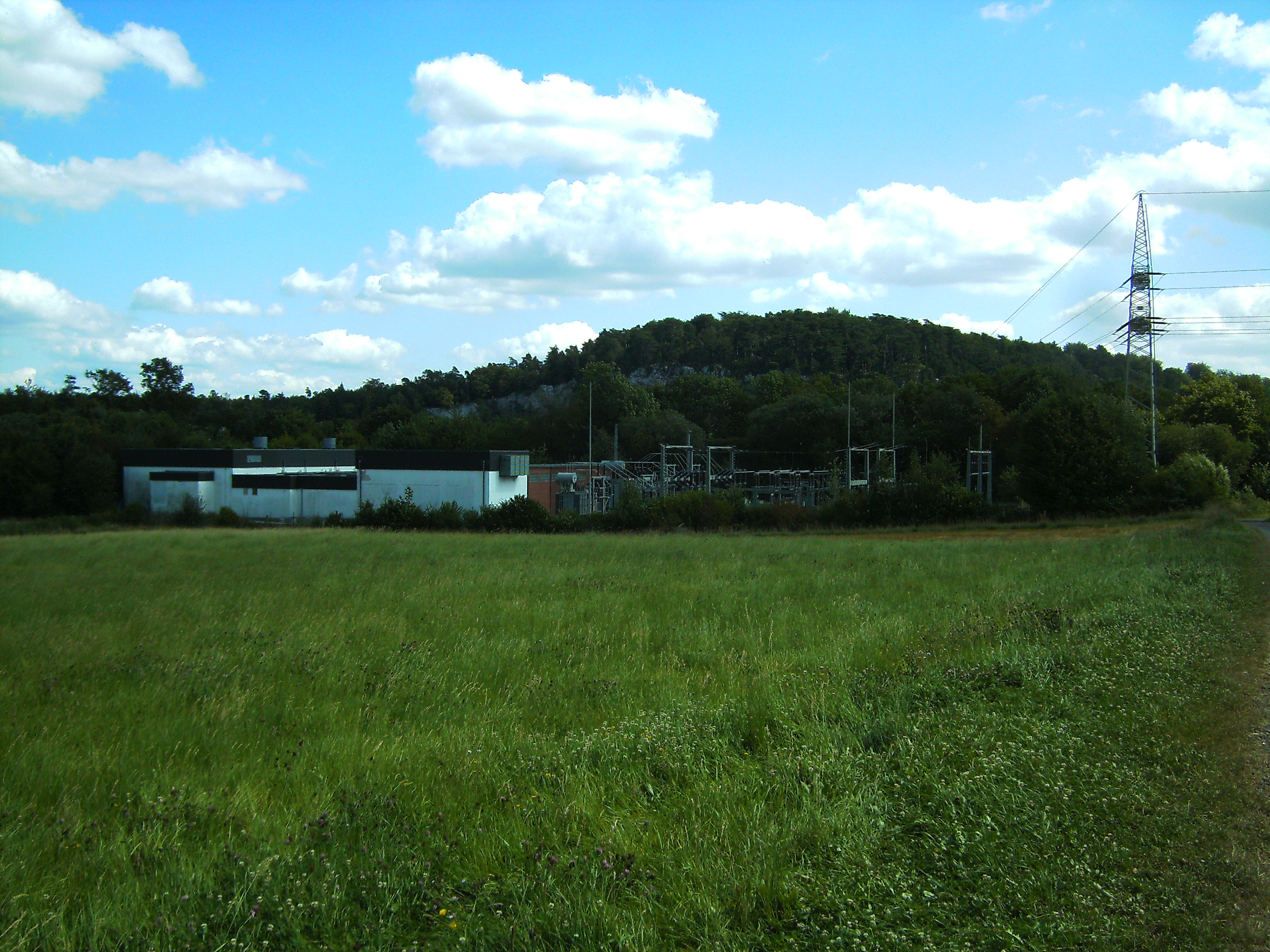
Neuhof substation in August 2009

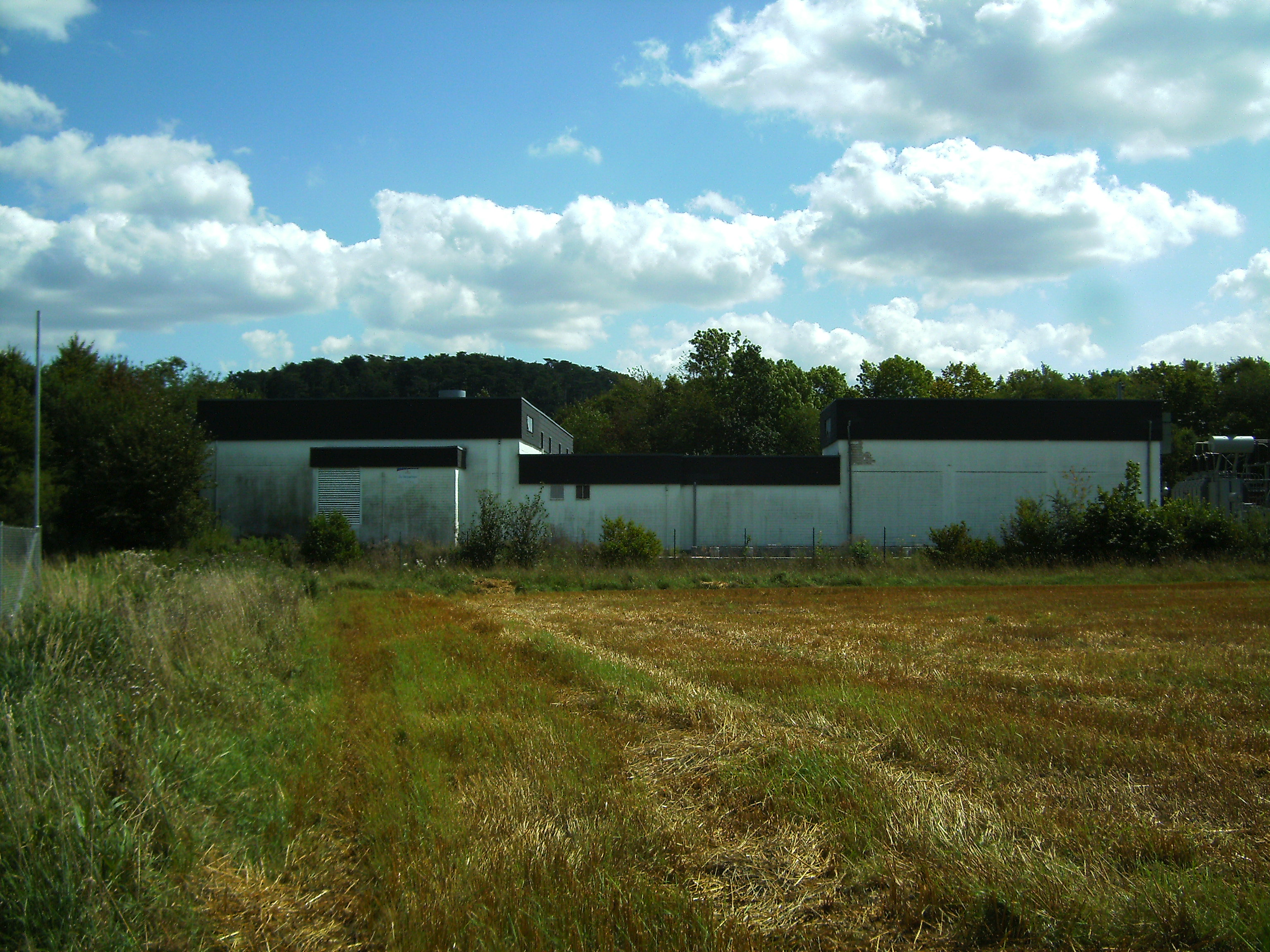
View of former converter hall

Neuhof Substation is a 110 kV substation in Neuhof, an urban part of Bad Sachsa, Lower Saxony. The Neuhof substation went in service in 1985 and was connected with a 110 kV-powerline for three phase alternating current with the Wolkramshausen substation in former East Germany. It was therefore one of the few substations in former West Germany, into which electricity from GDR was fed. Through the Neuhof substation up to 40 MVA could be imported. Up to 25 MVA of the imported power could be fed via 5 rotary motor-generators, which were manufactured by Siemens and used for the compensation of frequency fluctuations of the East German power grid, into the power grid of West Germany. Additionally power was fed directly from the East German power grid into the grids of Bad Sachsa, Walkenried, Zorge and Wieda. The converters consisted of a three-phase asynchronous motor with a short circuited rotor on the driving side and an asynchronous generator with a slip-ring fed rotor, whereby the frequency adjustment was made by a static frequency inverter, which feeds the rotor. Startup of a converter took place using the slip-ring rotor with a conventional starter circuit. After the converter had reached its nominal speed, the short circuited rotor was connected, which then took over the drive. In April 1990 the plant was shut down and between 2003 and 2005 the machines were dismantled. The machine halls stand still today and are used by Harzenergie for internal purposes.
