= Walkenried (Samtgemeinde) =

Coordinates: 51.567°N 10.617°E

Walkenried (German pronunciation: [valkənˈʁiːt]) was a Samtgemeinde ("collective municipality") in the district of Osterode, in Lower Saxony, Germany. Its seat was in the village Walkenried. It was abolished in November 2016 when Walkenried became one municipality and Osterode merged with the district of Göttingen.

The Samtgemeinde Walkenried consisted of the following municipalities:

- Walkenried
- Wieda
- Zorge.
