= Osterode (district) =

Coordinates: 51°40′N 10°20′E

- District
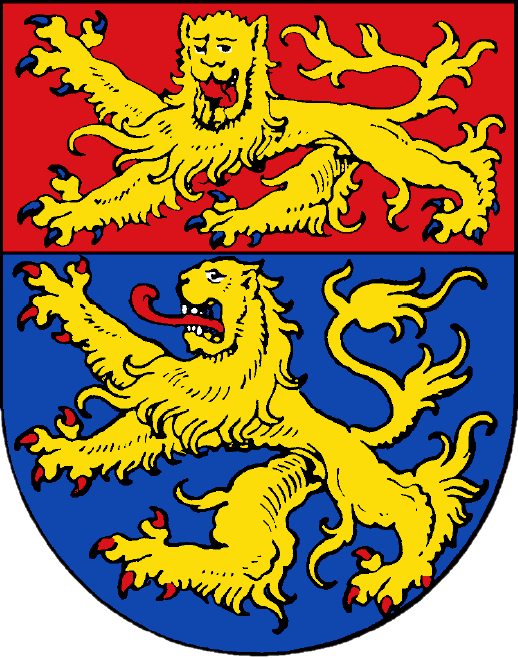
- Coat of arms

- Country: Germany
- State: Lower Saxony
- Founded: 1885
- Disbanded: 2016
- Capital: Osterode

Area
  - Total: 636 km^{2} (246 sq mi)

Population (2014)
  - Total: 73,793
  - Density: 120/km^{2} (300/sq mi)
- Time zone: UTC+01:00 (CET)
  - Summer (DST): UTC+02:00 (CEST)
- Vehicle registration: OHA

Osterode (German: [ˌɔstəˈʁoːdə]) was a district in Lower Saxony, Germany. It was bounded by (from the southwest and clockwise) the districts of Göttingen, Northeim and Goslar, and by the state of Thuringia (districts of Nordhausen and Eichsfeld).

== History ==
This part of the Harz mountains was ruled by the Welfen dynasty from the 12th century on. Osterode was the centre of the Principality of Brunswick-Grubenhagen, one of many small states within Brunswick-Lüneburg. Later this principality became part of Hanover, which in turn fell to the Kingdom of Prussia in 1866. In 1885 the Prussian administration established districts, among them Osterode.

On 1 November 2016, Osterode ceased to become a separate district and was merged with an enlarged Göttingen.

== Geography ==
More than two thirds of the district's area were occupied by the southwestern part of the Harz mountains, including the southern portion of the Harz National Park.

== Coat of arms ==
The coat of arms displayed two heraldic lions. The lion in the upper part was from the arms of Hanover, the lower lion represented the Welfen dynasty.

== Towns and municipalities ==
Towns:

1. Bad Lauterberg
2. Bad Sachsa
3. Herzberg am Harz
4. Osterode am Harz

Municipalities:

1. Bad Grund

Unincorporated area

- Harz (Landkreis Osterode am Harz) (267.37 km^{2}, uninhabited)

Samtgemeinden
1. Hattorf am Harz; 1. Elbingerode; 2. Hattorf am Harz^{1}; 3. Hörden am Harz; 4. Wulften am Harz	2. Walkenried; 1. Walkenried^{1}; 2. Wieda; 3. Zorge
^{1}seat of the Samtgemeinde

== See also ==
- Metropolitan region Hannover-Braunschweig-Göttingen-Wolfsburg
