= Eisenhuth GmbH & Co KG =

German manufacturing company

- Founded: 1945
- Founder: Wilhelm Eisenhuth; Herbert Eisenhuth
- Headquarters: Osterode, Germany
- Key people: Thorsten Hickmann (CEO since 1997); Toni Adamek (CEO since 2016)

Eisenhuth GmbH & Co KG is a German manufacturing company founded in 1945 that focuses on component manufacturing for fuel cells and electrolysers, as well as the manufacturing of rubber and silicon parts.

== History ==
Eisenhuth GmbH was established in 1945 by Wilhelm Eisenhuth and his son Herbert Eisenhuth in Osterode, Germany. In 1947, the company started manufacturing molds for plastic and rubber components.

In 1961, Herbert Eisenhuth's wife, Elisabeth Hickmann led the company. In 1997, Dr. Thorsten Hickmann, stepson of Elisabeth Hickmann, assumed the role of CEO. The company expanded its manufacturing capabilities to plastic, rubber, and silicone parts.

In 2006, it received Cooperation Award of the State of Lower Saxony.

In 2007 Eisenhuth GmbH acquired the Fuel Cell Plate activities of SGL Carbon. In 2010, the company started production of graphitic bipolar plates for Redox Flow batteries using injection molding techniques.

Eisenhuth GmbH expanded its focus to encompass electrolyzer components in 2015. Since 2021 the company has been producing stacks.

In 2019, the company received Innovation Award of the District of Göttingen and became co-winner (under the auspices of CUTEC) of the German Sustainability Award 2018 and winner (together with University of Halle) of the IQ-Innovation-award.

== Operations ==
As of 2023, Eisenhuth is mainly a supplier of bipolar plates, gaskets, and stacks for electrolyzers and fuel cells. The company's clients are predominantly located across Europe, with the largest export countries being France, Denmark, Portugal, Spain, Romania, and Slovakia. Additionally, Eisenhuth operates in India, Korea, China, Japan and Australia.

The company is headquartered in Osterode and has two production facilities there.

Thorsten Hickmann (since 1997) and Toni Adamek (since 2016) are the CEOs of Eisenhuth.

== Literature ==
- Schafner, Katharina: Modellierung der Crossover-Prozesse und Entwicklung von Kapazitatsausgleichsstrategien zur Betriebsoptimierung von Vanadium-Redox-Flow-Batterien (2020, publisher: Cuvillier Verlag, ISBN 9783736961401)
- Verlag, Carl Hanser: Dünnere Bipolarplatten für Brennstoffzellen: Modifizierte leitfähige Compounds ermöglichen die Herstellung von Bipolarfolien vom Coil
