= Konrad Schmid =

Konrad Schmid may refer to:

- Konrad Schmid (millenarian) (died 1368), leader of a group of flagellants and millenarians in Thuringia
- Konrad Schmid (theologian) (born 1965), professor of Ancient Judaism and the Hebrew Bible

== See also ==
- Konrad Schmidt, American baseball catcher
