= Uffe (Wieda) =

River in Germany

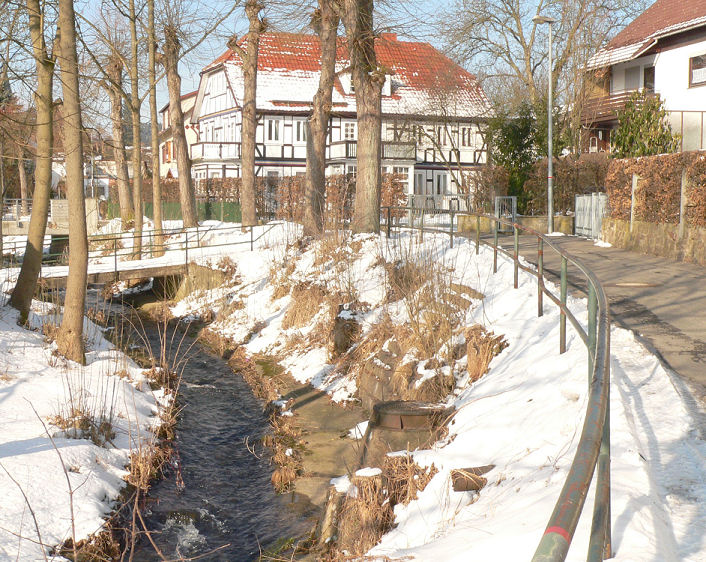
- Part of the middle course of the Uffe through Bad Sachsa

Location
- Country: Germany
- States: Thuringia and Lower Saxony

Physical characteristics
- Mouth
  - location: Wieda
  - coordinates: 51.5538°N 10.6557°E

Basin features
- Progression: Wieda→ Zorge→ Helme→ Unstrut→ Saale→ Elbe→ North Sea

The Uffe is a river in the states Lower Saxony and Thuringia, Germany.

The Uffe has its source on the Großer Bockstalskopf in Lower Saxony, a subpeak of the Ravensberg mountain, and flows through the town of Bad Sachsa down to the village of Neuhof (belongs to Bad Sachsa). From there the Uffe is known as the Sachsengraben ("Saxon Ditch") and continues to the village of Branderode (belongs to Hohenstein).

The stream then sinks into the gypsum karst, before reaching the River Wieda beyond the village of Obersachswerfen (belongs to Hohenstein). The Wieda, too, regularly dries up behind the hamlet of Wiedigshof.

Until the middle of the last century the Uffe divided in the village of Neuhof. The main stream flowed towards Klettenberg and Holbach where its water power was used in several mills. This stream is still called the Uffe today. The branch running towards Branderode is called the Sachsengraben and passes the villages of Branderode and Obersachswerfen before discharging below Schwinden into the Wieda, which flows into the Zorge downstream of Schwinden. The waters of the Zorge pass down the Helme, Unstrut and Saale into the Elbe.

Today the Uffe has no direct route beyond Neuhof (a sewage farm intervenes) and it now begins in front of a bridge (Branderode - Klettenberg road) about 5 metres above the Sachsengraben. Due to the lack of a link to the 'main' Uffe, it is usually dry there, is filled by springs and flows through the villages of Klettenberg and Holbach, by the B 243 federal road, onto the Ichte.

Between Bad Sachsa and Neuhof, the Uffe flows immediately past the foot of the Sachsenstein, a former coral reef in the Zechstein Sea. Here, by a section of the South Harz Railway, are the ruins of the Sachsenstein Castle.

== See also ==
- List of rivers of Thuringia
- List of rivers of Lower Saxony
