= Wieda (river) =

River in Germany

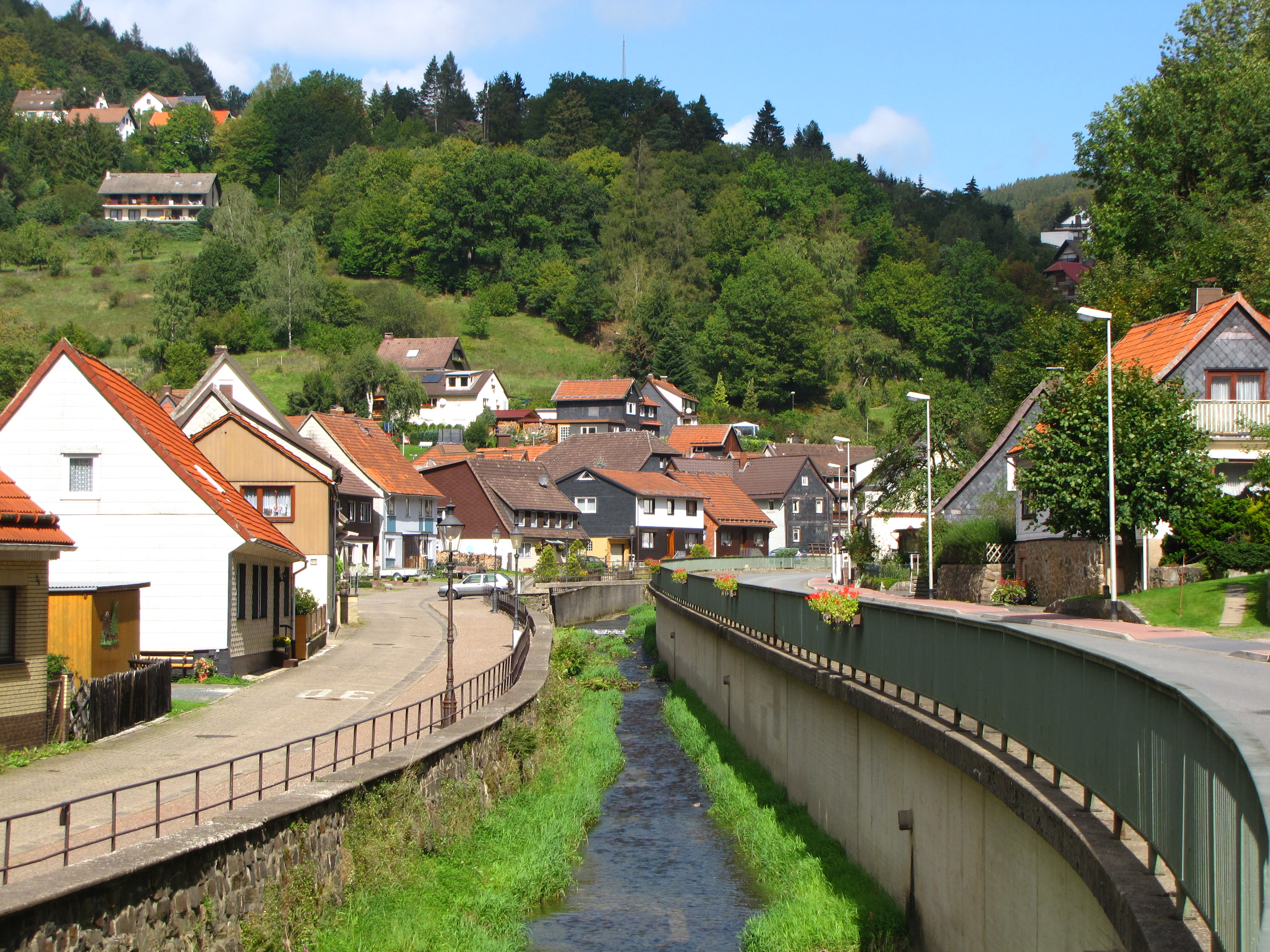
- The Wieda in the village of Wieda

Location
- Location: Counties of Göttingen in Lower Saxony and Nordhausen in Thuringia (Germany)
- Reference no.: DE: 564822

Physical characteristics
- Source
  - location: in the Harz on the Stöberhai
  - coordinates: 51°39′43″N 10°33′23.8″E
  - elevation: ca. 545 m above sea level (NHN)
- Mouth
  - location: near Woffleben into the Zorge
  - coordinates: 51°33′05.7″N 10°44′24.6″E
  - elevation: 206.9 m above sea level (NHN)
- Length: 22 km

Basin features
- Progression: Zorge → Helme → Unstrut → Saale → Elbe → North Sea
- River system: Elbe
- Tributaries
  - left: see below
  - right: see below

The Wieda is a river in the German states of Lower Saxony and Thuringia.

The Wieda has its source above the village of Wieda, flows through the village of Walkenried, the hamlet of Wiedigshof and the village of Gudersleben before discharging in the Harz river Zorge near Woffleben, a district of Ellrich. Its channel regularly dries up in the summer months - it sinks into the karst soil and reappears in other places as springs. Its most important tributary is the Uffe.

== See also ==
- List of rivers of Lower Saxony
- List of rivers of Thuringia
