= Raniero Fasani =

Raniero Fasani (d. 1282) was an Italian Franciscan who in 1260 birthed the movement of the flagellants or disciplinati, who sung as they flagellate themselves. He was probably from Perugia.
