= Flagellant =

Practitioner of a form of mortification of the flesh

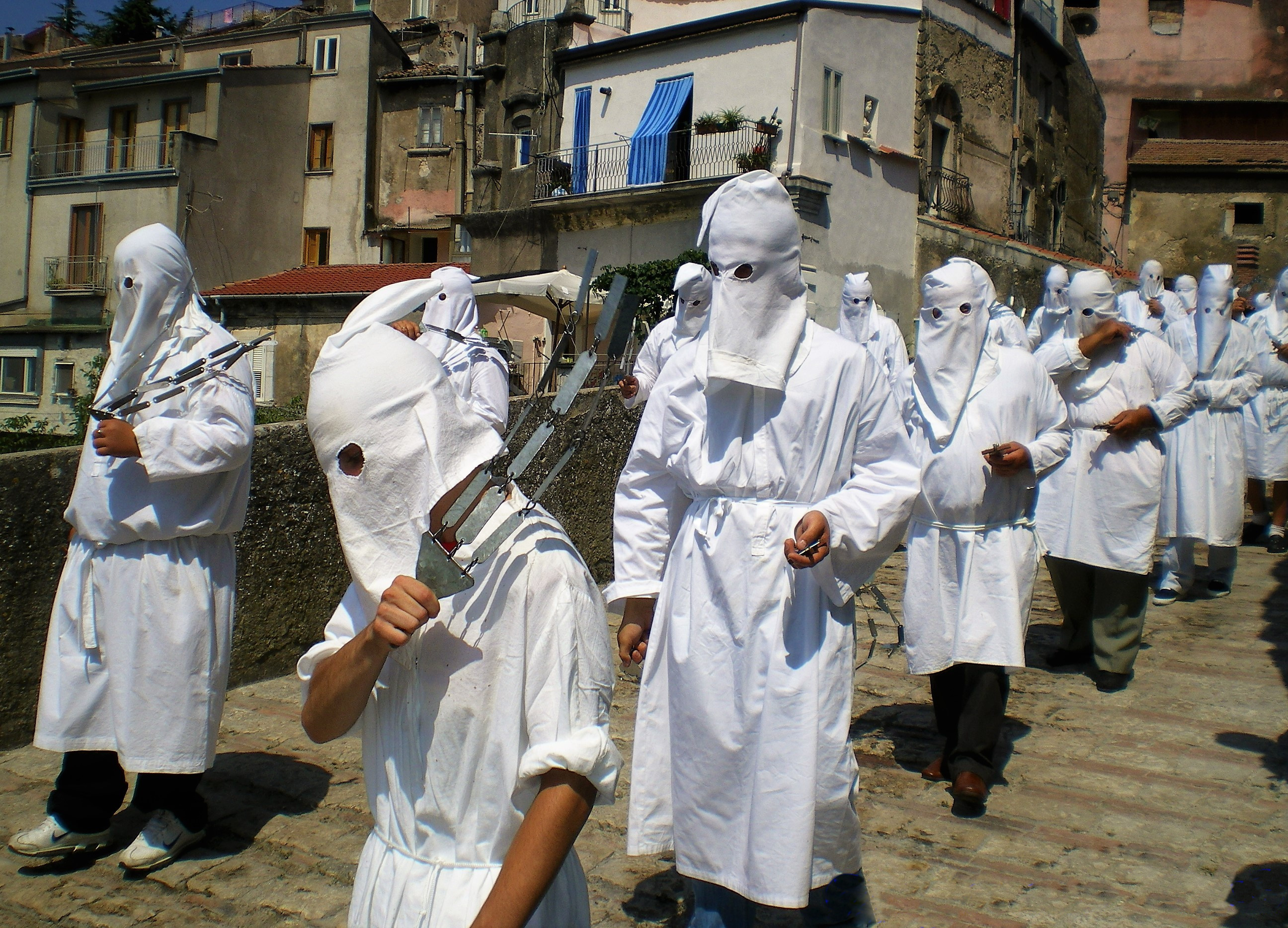
A confraternity of penitents in Italy mortifying the flesh with disciplines in a seven-hour procession; capirote are worn by penitents so that attention is not drawn towards themselves, but to God, as they repent.

Flagellants are practitioners of a form of mortification of the flesh by whipping their skin with various instruments of penance. Many Christian confraternities of penitents have flagellants, who beat themselves, both in the privacy of their dwellings and in public processions, to repent of sins and share in the Passion of Jesus.

In the 14th century, a movement within Western Christianity known as Flagellantism became popular and adherents "began beating their flesh in a public penitential ritual in response to war, famine, plague and fear engendered by millenarianism." Though this movement withered away, the practices of public repentance and promoting peace were adopted by the flagellants in Christian, especially Roman Catholic, confraternities of penitents that exist to the present-day.

== History ==
1904 illustration of a medieval Spanish flagellant.

Flagellation (from Latin flagellare, to whip) was quite a common practice amongst the more fervently religious throughout antiquity. The practice became popular in 1260 thanks to the example of Blessed Raniero Fasani of Perugia, a saintly hermit who began scourging himself publicly after receiving an apparition of the Virgin Mary and St. Bevignate who told him to start preaching penance for sins and to establish peace. He attracted followers and the movement grew in popularity throughout Italy and the rest of Europe.

Christianity has formed a permanent tradition surrounding the doctrine of mortification of the flesh, ranging from self-denial, wearing hairshirts and chains, to fasting and self-flagellation using the discipline. Those who practice self-flagellation claim that St. Paul's statement in the Bible ‘I chastise my body’ refers to self-inflicted bodily scourging (1 Corinthians 9:27). There are prominent Christians who have practiced self-flagellation. Martin Luther, the Protestant Reformer, self-flagellated among other ascetic practices during his early years as an Augustinian friar (although he later condemned such practices). Likewise, the Congregationalist writer Sarah Osborn also practiced self-flagellation in order "to remind her of her continued sin, depravity, and vileness in the eyes of God". It became "quite common" for members of the Tractarian movement within the Anglican Communion to practice self-flagellation using a discipline.

Historically speaking, in the 11th century, Peter Damian, a Benedictine monk in the Roman Catholic tradition, taught that spirituality should manifest itself in physical discipline; he admonished those who sought to follow Christ to practice self-flagellation for the duration of the time it takes one to recite forty Psalms, increasing the number of flagellations on holy days of the liturgical calendar. For Damian, only those who shared in the sufferings of Christ could be saved. Throughout Christian history, the mortification of the flesh, wherein one denies physical pleasures, has been commonly followed by members of the clergy, especially in Christian monasteries and convents; the 11th-century Dominicus Loricatus repeated the entire Psalter twenty times in one week, accompanying each psalm with a hundred lash-strokes to his back. The distinction of the Flagellants was to take this self-mortification into the cities and other public spaces as a demonstration of piety.

== Flagellantism ==
Flagellantism was a 14th-century movement, consisting of penitents in the Catholic Church. It began as a Christian pilgrimage and was later condemned by the Catholic Church as heretical. The followers were noted for including public flagellation in their rituals. This was a common practice during the Black Death, or the Great Plague.

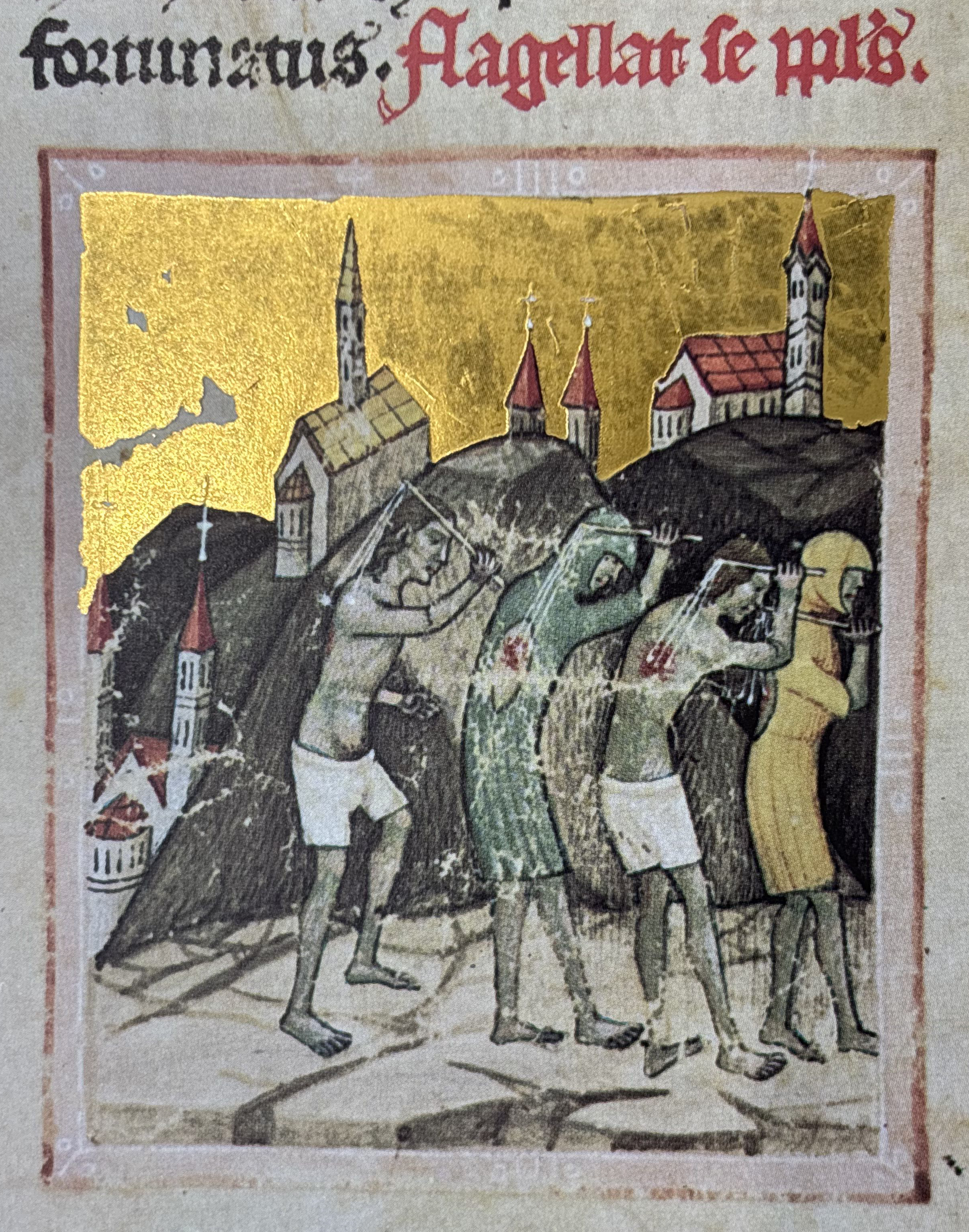
Flagellants in the Kingdom of Hungary in 1263 (Illuminated Chronicle, 1358)

=== Spread in the 14th century ===
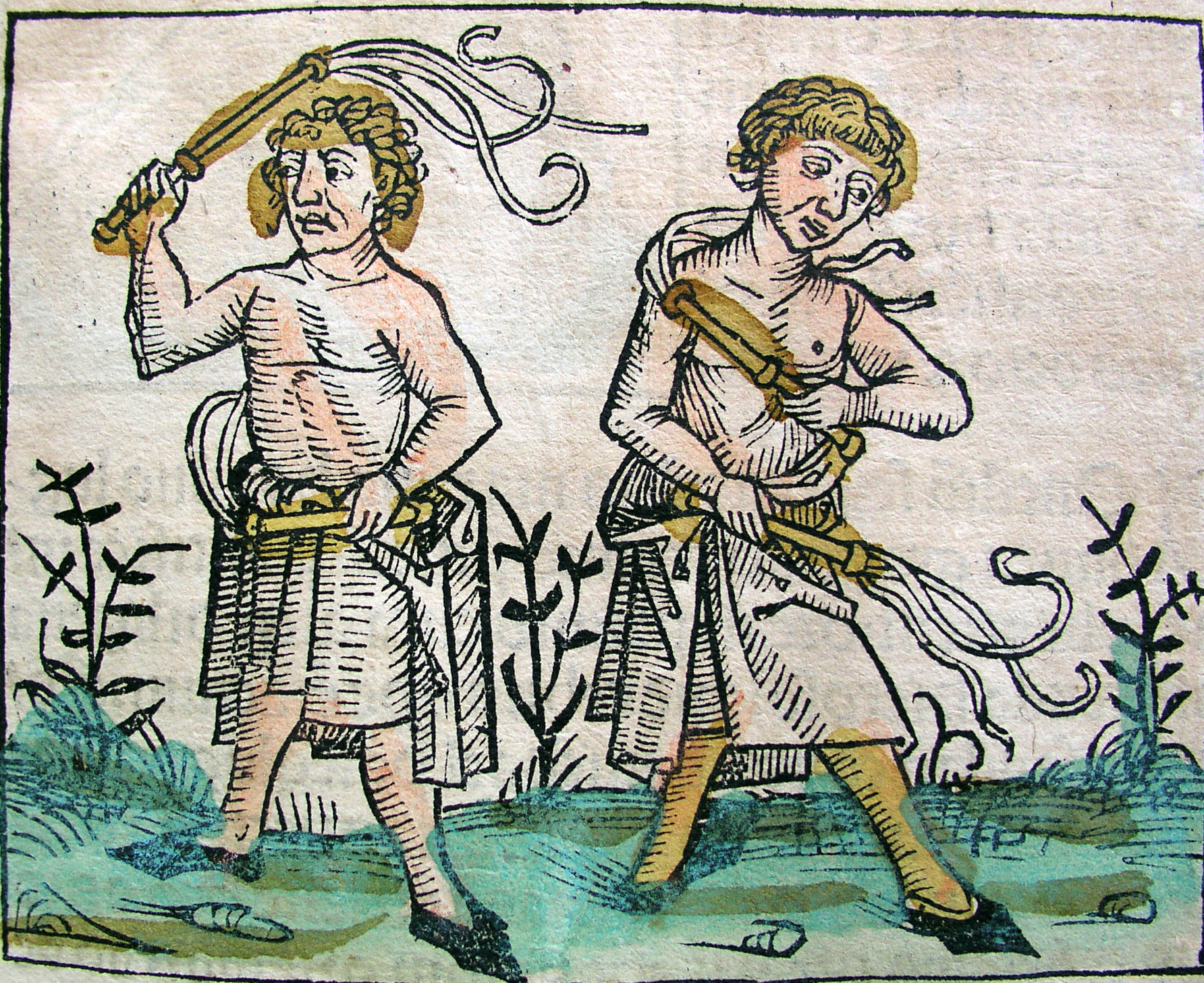
Woodcut of flagellants (Nuremberg Chronicle, 1493)

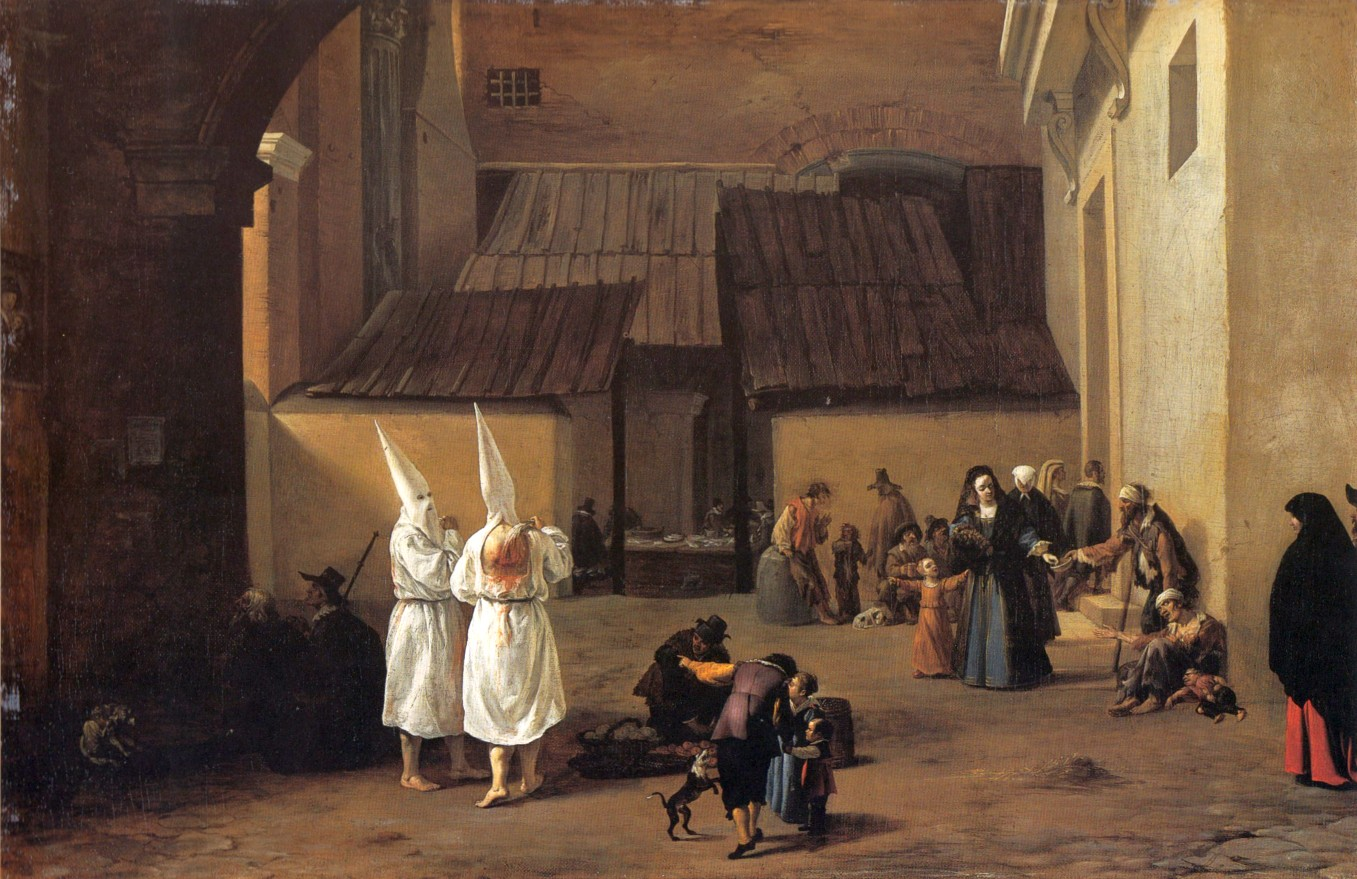
The flagellants by Pieter van Laer

The first recorded incident was in Central Italy in Perugia, in 1259, the year after severe crop damage and famine throughout Europe. From Perugia the phenomenon seemed to spread across Northern Italy and into Austria. Other incidents are recorded in 1296, 1333-34 (the Doves), notably at the time of the Black Death (1349), and 1399. The practice peaked during the Black Death. Spontaneously Flagellant groups arose across Northern and Central Europe in 1349, including in England.

Initially the Catholic Church tolerated the Flagellants and individual monks, friars and priests joined in the early movements. By the 14th century, the Church was less tolerant and the rapid spread of the movement was alarming. Clement VI officially condemned them in a bull of October 20, 1349 and instructed Church leaders to suppress the Flagellants. This position was reinforced in 1372 by Gregory XI who associated the Flagellants with other heretical groups, notably the Beghards, and instructed inquisitors to eradicate them. They were accused of heresies including doubting the need for the sacraments, denying ordinary ecclesiastical jurisdiction and claiming to work miracles. In 1392, a sect of Flagellants and Beghards, consisting of peasants, were found throughout Swabia and Wurzburg. The papal inquisitor imposed the penance of preaching and joining a crusade against the Ottoman Turks.

The Inquisition was active against any revival of the movement in the 15th century, but action against the flagellants was often taken by the local princes. In 1414, 80–90 followers of Konrad Schmid were burned in Thuringia, in Germany, even though they had recanted. Three hundred were burnt in one day in 1416, also in Thuringia. Other trials where the accused were condemned as Flagellants were recorded as late as the 1480s. The practice of flagellation within the bounds of the Catholic Church continued as an accepted form of penance.

Rulers like Catherine de' Medici and France's King Henry III supported Flagellants but Henry IV banned them. Flagellant orders like Hermanos Penitentes (Spanish 'Penitential Brothers') also appeared in colonial Spanish America, even against the specific orders of Church authorities.

==== In Italy ====
The first recorded cases of mass popular flagellation occurred in Perugia, in 1259. The prime cause of the Perugia episode is unclear, but it followed an outbreak of an epidemic and chroniclers report how mania spread throughout almost all the people of the city. Thousands of citizens gathered in great processions, singing and with crosses and banners, they marched throughout the city whipping themselves. It is reported that surprising acts of charity and repentance accompanied the marchers. However, one chronicler noted that anyone who did not join in the flagellation was accused of being in league with the devil. They also killed Jews and priests who opposed them. Marvin Harris links them to the Messianic preaching of Gioacchino da Fiore.

Similar processions occurred across Northern Italy, with groups of up to 10,000 strong processing in Modena, Bologna, Reggio and Parma, although certain city authorities refused the Flagellant processions entry.

A similar movement arose again in 1399, again in Northern Italy in the form of the White Penitents or Bianchi movement. This rising is said to have been started by a peasant who saw a vision. The movement became known as the laudesi from their constant hymn singing. At its peak, a group of over 15,000 adherents gathered in Modena and marched to Rome, but the movement rapidly faded when one of its leaders was burned at the stake by order of Boniface IX.

==== In Germany and the Low Countries ====
The German and Low Countries movement, the Brothers of the Cross, is particularly well documented - they wore white robes and marched across Germany in 33.5 day campaigns (each day referred to a year of Jesus's earthly life) of penance, only stopping in any one place for no more than a day. They established their camps in fields near towns and held their rituals twice a day. The ritual began with the reading of a letter, claimed to have been delivered by an angel and justifying the Flagellants' activities. Next, the followers would fall to their knees and scourge themselves, gesturing with their free hands to indicate their sin and striking themselves rhythmically to songs, known as Geisslerlieder, until blood flowed. Sometimes the blood was soaked up in rags and treated as a holy relic. Originally members were required to receive permission to join from their spouses and to prove that they could pay for their food. However, some towns began to notice that sometimes Flagellants brought plague to towns where it had not yet surfaced. Therefore, later they were denied entry. They responded with increased physical penance.

== Modern flagellants ==
=== Christianity ===
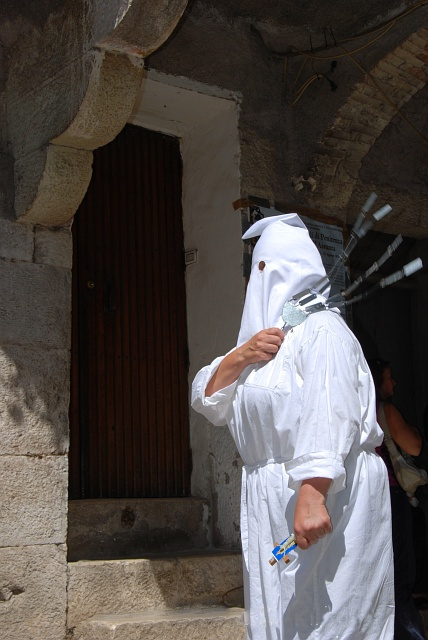
A flagellant in Italy mortifying the flesh with a discipline (2010).

==== Roman Catholicism ====
Modern processions of hooded Flagellants are still a feature of various Mediterranean Christian countries, mainly in Italy, Spain and some of its former colonies such as the Philippines, usually every year during Lent and intensify during Holy Week. For example, in the comune of Guardia Sanframondi in Campania, such parades are organized once every seven years. In Italy, members of the Flagellant movement were called disciplinati, while laudesi never practiced flagellation, but met together in their own chapel to sing laudi (canticles) in honour of the Blessed Virgin, but which gradually assumed a dramatic form and grew into a theatrical form known as rappresentazioni sacre. A play in the Roman dialect of the 14th century, edited by Vattasso (Studi e Testi, no. 4, p. 53), explicitly bears the title lauda.

In the Philippines, some practice penitential flagellation and have themselves briefly crucified, at times in fulfilment of a panatà (sacred vow) made to God. Both customs are deemed as heterodox acts of penance by the Church in the Philippines, whose episcopate have condemned repeatedly.

Los hermanos penitentes (English: “The penitent brothers”) is a semi-secret society of flagellants among Hispanic Roman Catholics in the American states of Colorado and New Mexico.

=== Other religions ===
Unrelated practices exist in non-Christian traditions, including actual flagellation amongst some Shiites who were converted by the Qizilbash (commemorating the martyrdom of Husayn ibn Ali).

== See also ==
- Algolagnia
- Ashura, Tatbir
- Dancing mania
- Flagellation
- Khlysts (Imperial Russia)
- Penitentes (New Mexico)
- Self-harm
- The Seventh Seal, which also includes a scene of monks striking themselves on the forehead repeatedly with boards while chanting.
- Redemptive suffering
- La Cercha
- Nine Emperor Gods Festival. Also referred to as the Phuket Vegetarian Festival, it is famous for its ritualised acts of flagellation, self-wounding, and trance-like ecstasies, as well as its vegetarian food-based fasting.

== Sources ==
- Aberth, John (2010). From the Brink of the Apocalypse: Confronting Famine, War, Plague and Death in the Later Middle Ages (2nd ed.). Routledge.
- Cohn, Norman (1970). The Pursuit of the Millennium: Revolutionary Millenarians and Mystical Anarchists of the Middle Ages. Oxford University Press. ISBN 0-19-500456-6.
- Lea, Henry Charles (1922). A History of the Inquisition. Vol. II. The Macmillan Company.
- Schmidt, Muhammad Wolfgang G A, ed. (2017). "And on this Rock I Will Build My Church". A new Edition of Schaff's "History of the Reformation 1517-1648". Disserta Verlag.
