= La Cercha =

Italian liturgical drama

La Cercha is a liturgical drama that takes place on Good Friday, in Collesano, province of Palermo (Sicily). According to a detail discovered in a canvas of the Sicilian painter Lo Zoppo di Ganci's a penitential procession like "la Cercha" was staged for the first time in 1623.

It is characterized by the presence of actors bearing in their hands the symbols of Passion of the Christ, like the nails and Crown of Thorns. In addition, there are costumed actors representing Jesus carrying the cross, our Lady, the disciple John, the Holy women, the Centurion with his cohort of armed soldiers, Veronica and the angels.

The ritual begins at dawn, to end at midday, after the city streets. Another notable feature of La Cercha is that it is a silent procession with participants expressing concepts, rather than a drama with spoken dialogue. The Mystery Play la "Cercha" started in Collesano in 1667 thanks to the cooperation of the SS. Crucifix Brotherhood that tried inspiration by the Holy Friday procession made in Palermo in 1590 and 1951 by the Trinitary Congregation helped by the Spanish and Genoensis authorities that had their representative in the capital of the Island of Sicily. The history of Disciplinantes brotherhood started in Perugia in 1260 thanks to Raniero Fasani who preached the rite of flagellation as penitence. From Perugia the phenomenon of the Disciplinantes reached Genoa thanks to Osvaldo Opizzoni from Tortona. The Disciplinantes of Osvaldo Opizzoni founded in a short time more than 10 brotherhoods who chose churches and oratories to prepare their rites. These places have been called Casazze. In 1306 a first Disciplinantes brotherhood, called the "Brotherhood of St. Nicolò lo Reale", has been founded in Palermo. This brotherhood predicated also the flagellation as penitence and the adoration of the symbols of Jesus Christ Passion. Also in Spain appeared this Disciplinantes brotherhood in the 14th century thanks to predication of the Franciscans and the relationship between Genoa Republic, where the disciplinantes group were numerous, and Spain. In the 1521 in Sevilla has been held the first "Via Crucis" by the noble Fadrique Enriqèz Afàn de Ribera 1st marquis de Tarifa, starting from the St. Andrea's Palace called after "Pilatos Palace". As remarked in 1590 the Spanish Nation in Palermo organized officially its first Holy Week procession in which a Disciplinantes brotherhood brought the statue of the Nuestra Senora de la Soledad and the Jesus Christ Passion symbols who after the last diner started la "Cercha" or the "Search". The Collesano Holy Friday procession revivals that procession.

== Bibliography ==
- Settimana Santa in Sicilia - La Cercha di Collesano AA.: Giuseppe Valenza Kaori Sakurada. ISBN 978-88-908854-0-2
- Settimana Santa – Riti – Collesano. I. Valenza, Giuseppe <1951-> Biblioteca centrale della Regione Siciliana “Alberto Bombace” -
- Francesco Maria Emanuele e Gaetani, M.se di Villabianca: Processioni di Palermo Sacre e Profane a cura di Salvo di Matteo -
- Rosario Termotto, Angelo Asciutto & F. Scelsi, A. Mogavero Fina, G.Mannoia, A. Di Bernardo: da Collesano per gli emigrati (1991)
- Giuseppe Pitrè:Spettacoli e Feste Popolari Siciliane (1882)
- Mario Serraino: La Casazza Magna di Trapani (1980) -Beppino Tartaro: Origine e divenire dei Misteri di Trapani (2005)
