= Konrad Schmid (millenarian) =

German millenarian (??–1368)

Konrad Schmid (died 1368) was the leader of a group of flagellants and millenarians in Thuringia.

Schmid educated himself in the library of Walkenried Abbey, 20 km northwest of Nordhausen in Thuringia. He was also familiar with the traditions of the flagellants; these had flourished throughout Europe in 1348–49, during the Black Death, until they were condemned by a papal bull in 1349. Schmid first appeared about 1360, reviving the flagellant sect in Thuringia and proclaiming himself its leader. He claimed for himself both ecclesiastical and secular power. He asserted that the prophecies of Isaiah referred to him, not to Jesus. According to him, the flagellation of Christ was only a foreshadowing of his movement of flagellants. He styled himself King of Thuringia, thus identifying himself with both Frederick I, the late landgrave of Thuringia, and Frederick's grandfather, Frederick II, Holy Roman Emperor, who were associated in people's minds with the Emperor of the Last Days. Local people referred to him as Emperor Frederick.

Schmid preached that the millennium would begin in 1369. He had calculated the date from a study of the Book of Revelation, the prophecies of Hildegard of Bingen, the Sibyl, and other sources. Rejection of worldly pleasures and self-flagellation were, according to him, the only way to reconcile oneself with God. He also rejected the sacraments and other teachings, which led him into conflict with the Church. He required his followers to confess to him, allow him to beat them, and follow his will unquestioningly. His movement was closely associated with the Brethren of the Free Spirit, which were also active in the area at the time.

In the late 1360s, the inquisitor Walther Kerlinger turned his attention to Thuringia. In 1368, 40 flagellants were arrested in Nordhausen and seven were burned, one of whom appears to have been Schmid. His movement, however, continued for another century. His followers associated Schmid and an associate who died with him with Elijah and Enoch, two "witnesses" who, according to the Book of Revelation, would preach against Antichrist (the Roman Church), be put to death, and rise again. They expected him to return at any moment as both Emperor of the Last Days and divine being. Flagellants continued to be active in the area, and there were burnings in 1414, 1416, 1446, and 1454, in Nordhausen, Sangerhausen, Sonderhausen and elsewhere.
