= Wieda =

- Ortsteil of Walkenried
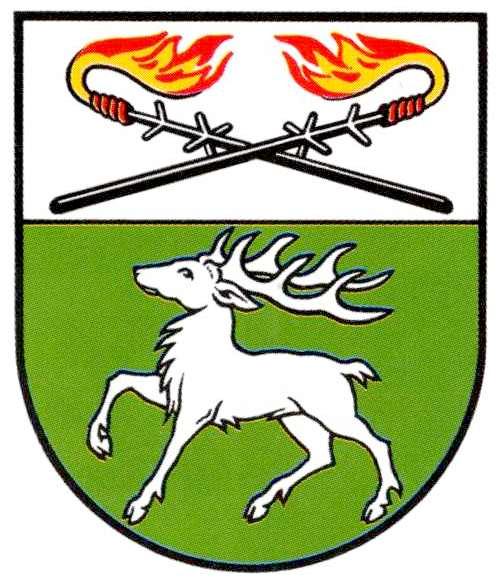
- Coat of arms
- Interactive map of Wieda
- Location within Germany Location within Lower Saxony
- Coordinates: 51°37′57″N 10°35′09″E
- Country: Germany
- State: Lower Saxony
- District: Göttingen
- Municipality: Walkenried

Area
  - Total: 6.53 km^{2} (2.52 sq mi)
- Elevation: 375 m (1,230 ft)

Population (2015-12-31)
  - Total: 1,295
  - Density: 198/km^{2} (514/sq mi)
- Time zone: UTC+01:00 (CET)
  - Summer (DST): UTC+02:00 (CEST)
- Postal codes: 37447
- Dialling codes: 05586
- Vehicle registration: GÖ, OHA

Wieda is a village and a former municipality in the district of Göttingen, in Lower Saxony, Germany. Since 1 November 2016, it is part of the municipality Walkenried.

Wieda is on River Wieda, a tributary of Zorge in the southern part of the Harz mountains.

== Sights ==
There are many well-preserved half-timbered houses in the center of Wieda, for example in the High Street close to the wooden Town Hall. The Old Clock Tower is on the top of a hill offering a scenic view of the municipality and its surroundings. Lutherkirche is the Protestant town church which was built in 1770.

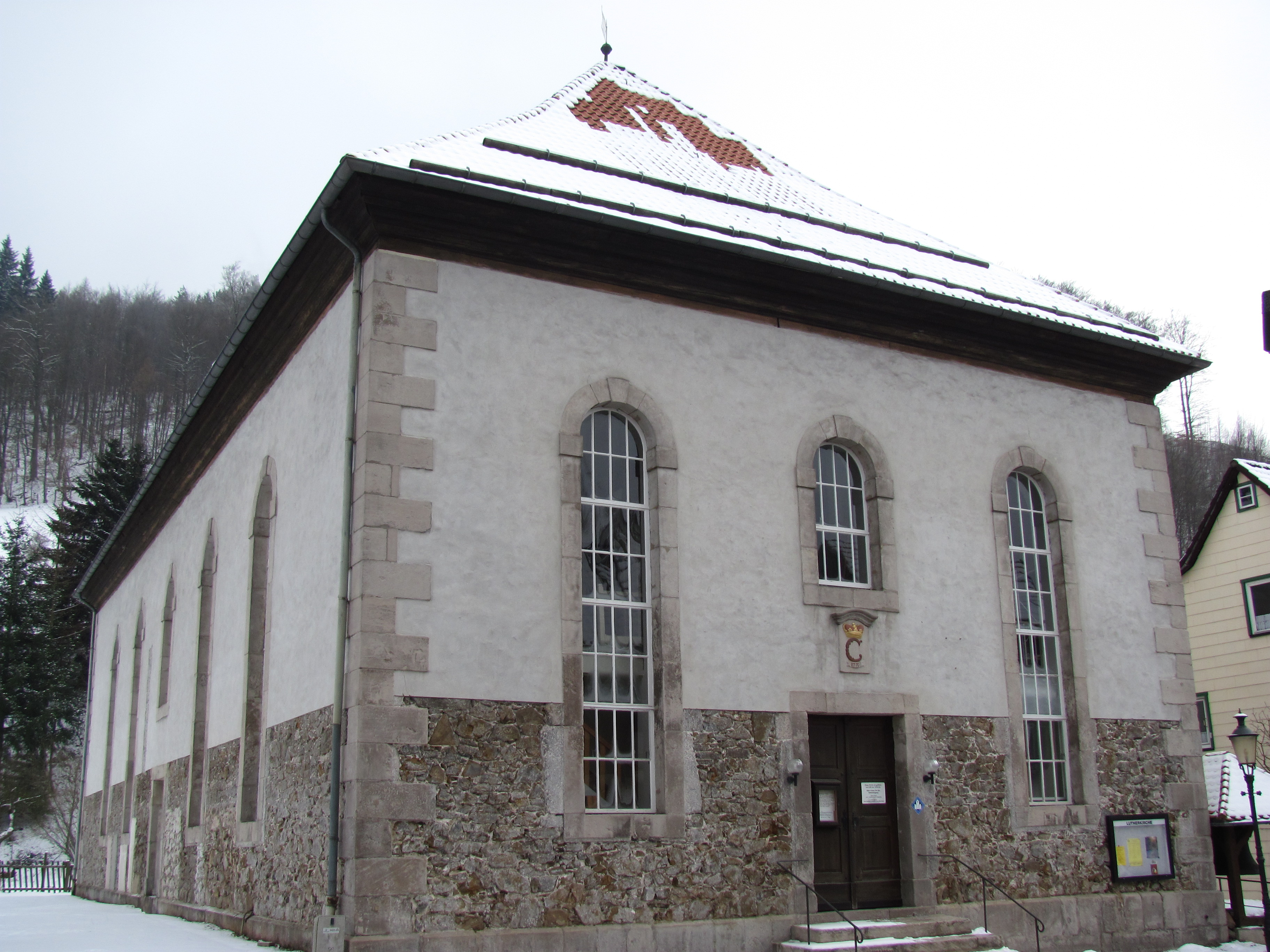
Protestant Church

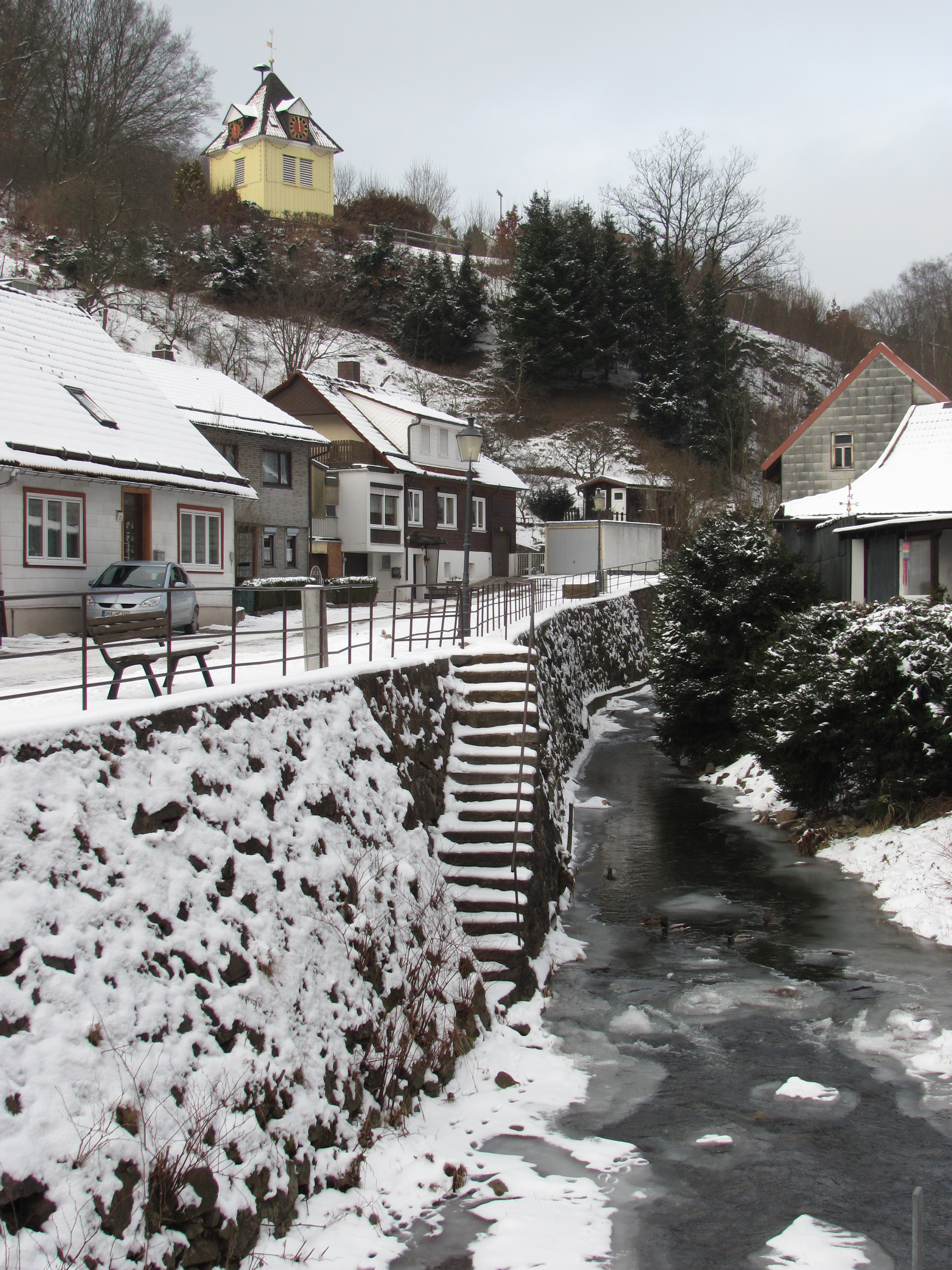
Clock Tower

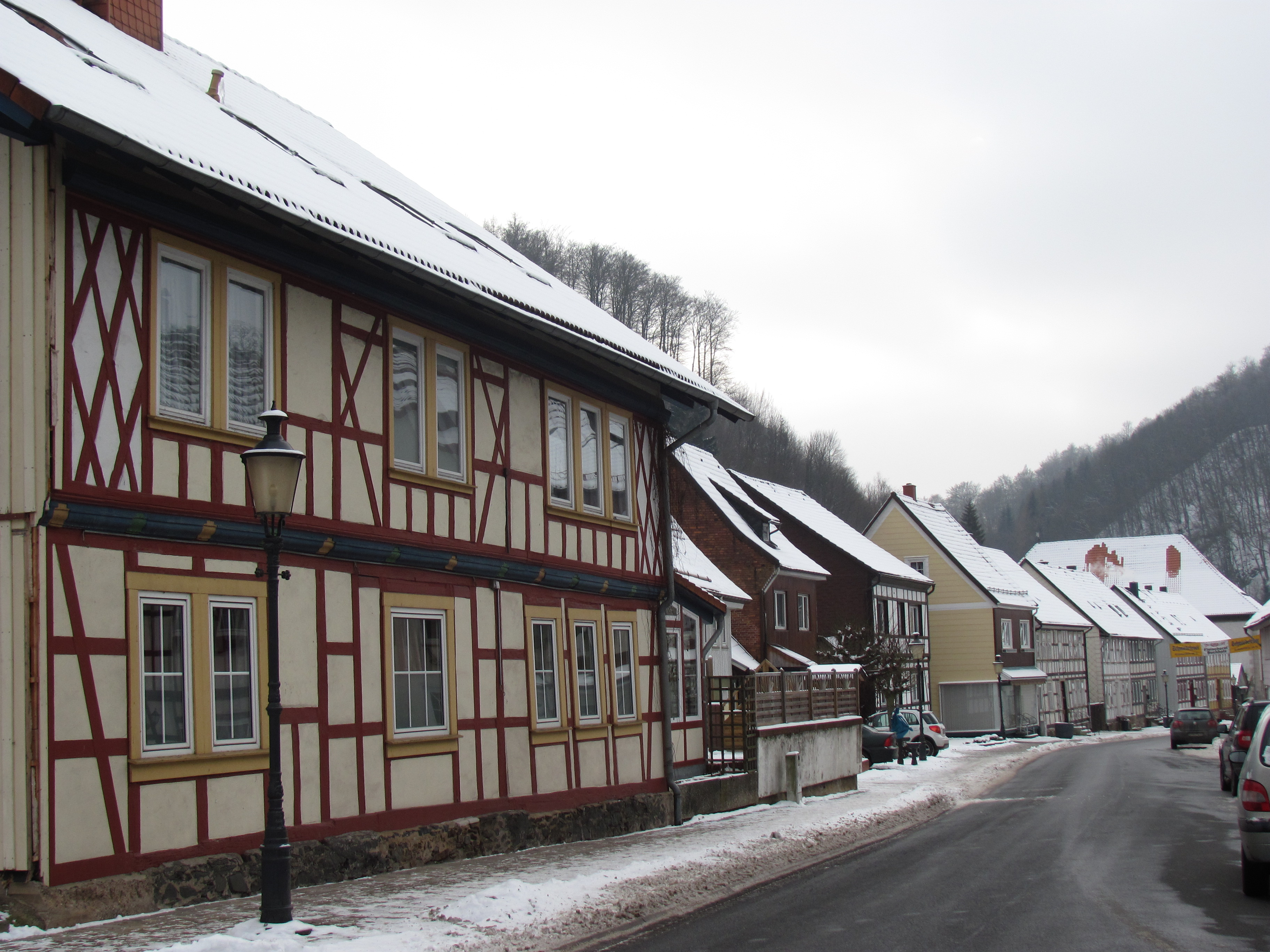
Half-timbered houses in the High Street

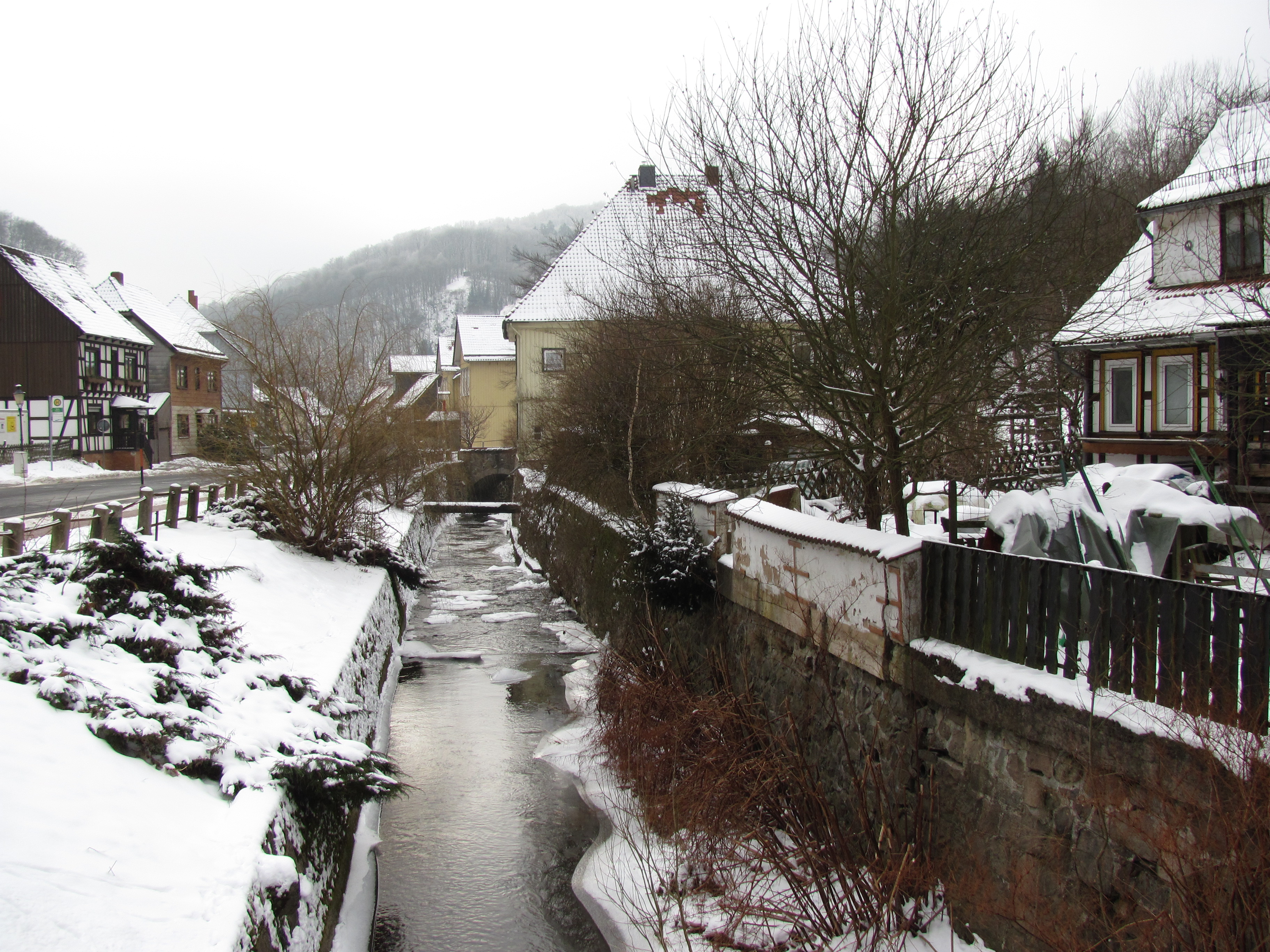
River Wieda

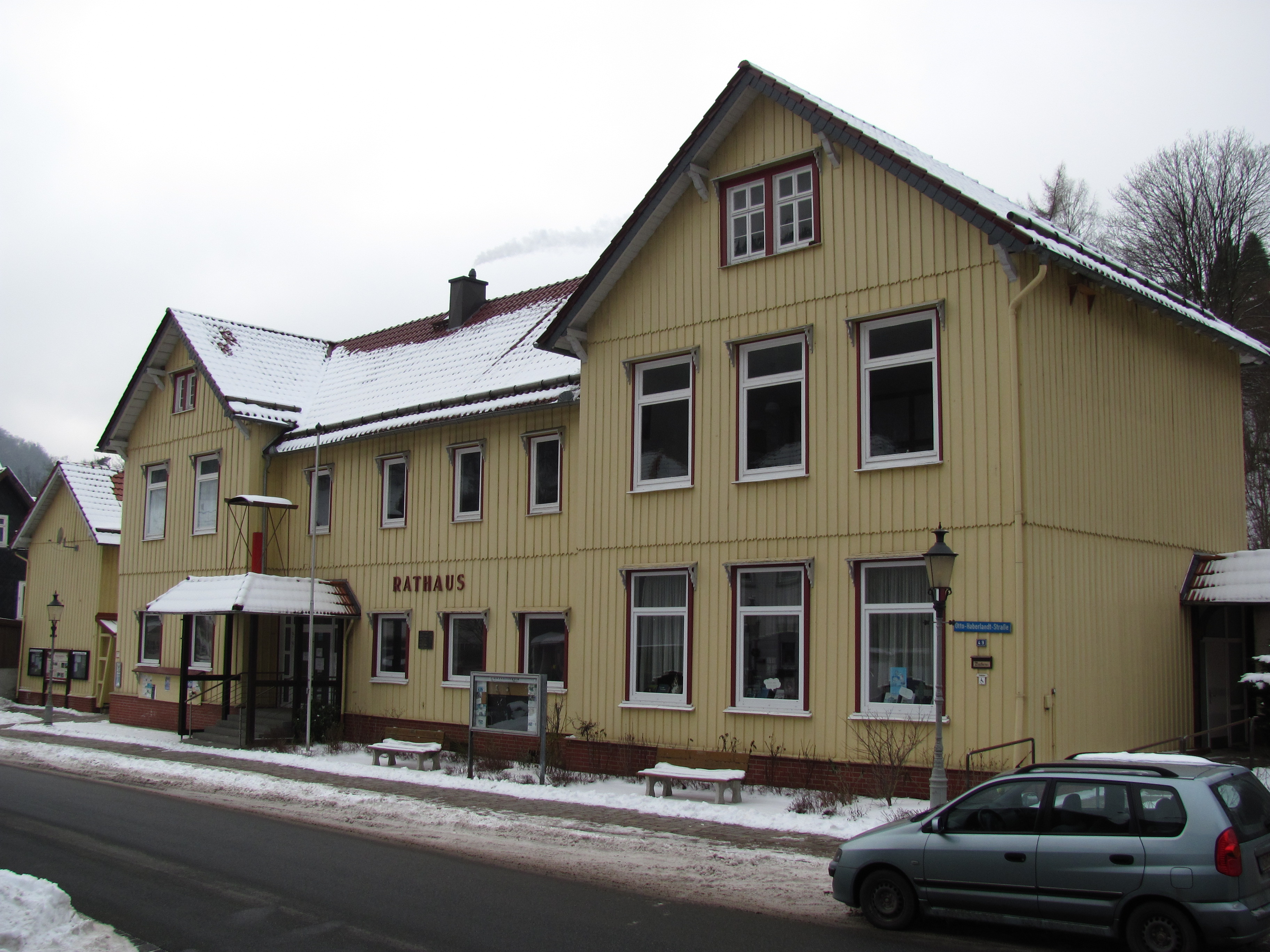
Town Hall
