= Zorge (river) =

River in Germany

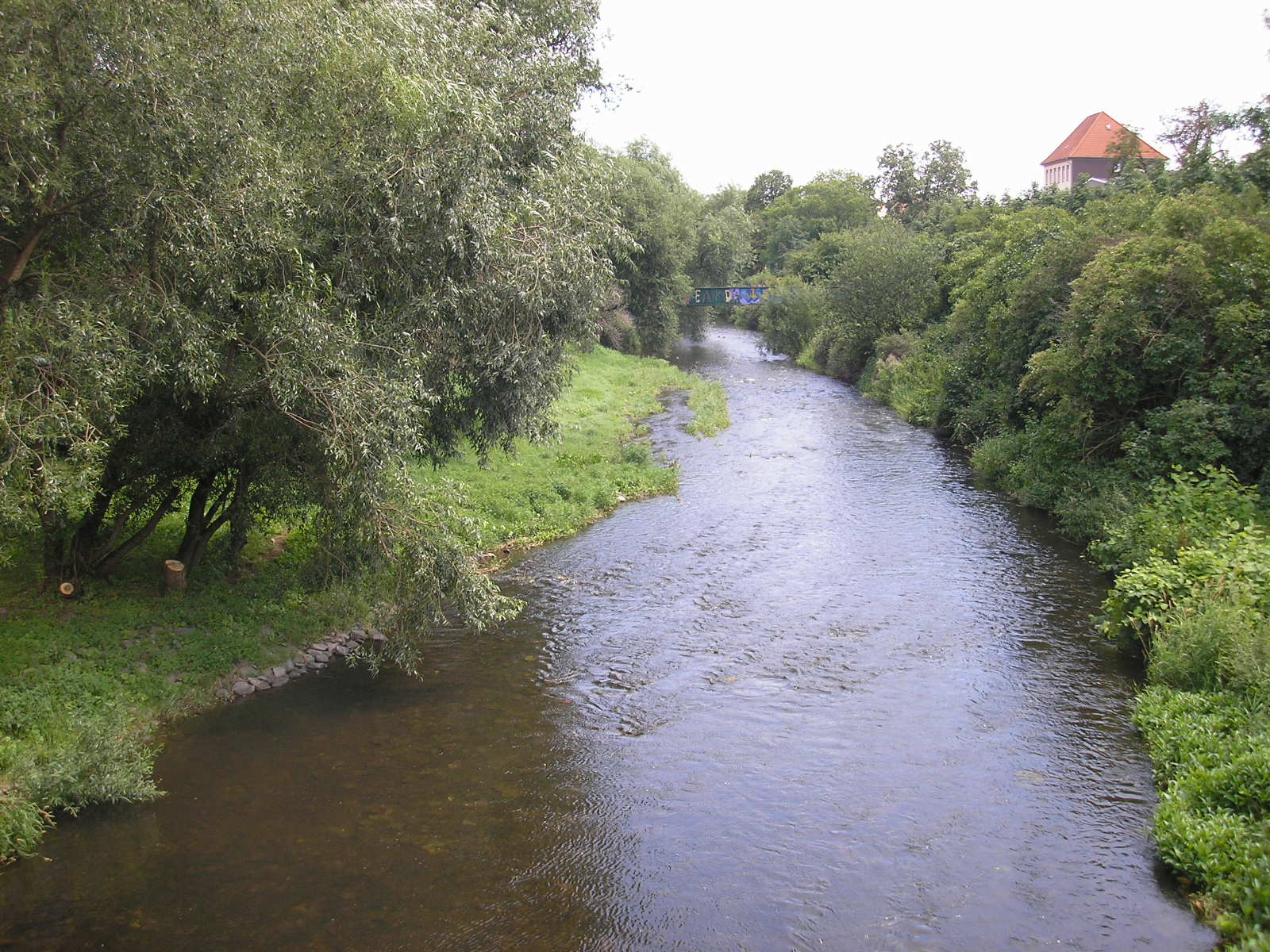
- The Zorge in Nordhausen

- Mouth of the Zorge

Location
- Country: Germany
- States: Lower Saxony and Thuringia

Physical characteristics
- Source
  - location: Start: confluence of the Wolfsbach and Sprakelbach in Zorge
  - coordinates: 51°38′14″N 10°38′02″E
  - elevation: ca 352 m above sea level (NN)
- Mouth
  - location: northeast of Heringen into the Helme
  - coordinates: 51.4524°N 10.9032°E

Basin features
- Progression: Helme→ Unstrut→ Saale→ Elbe→ North Sea
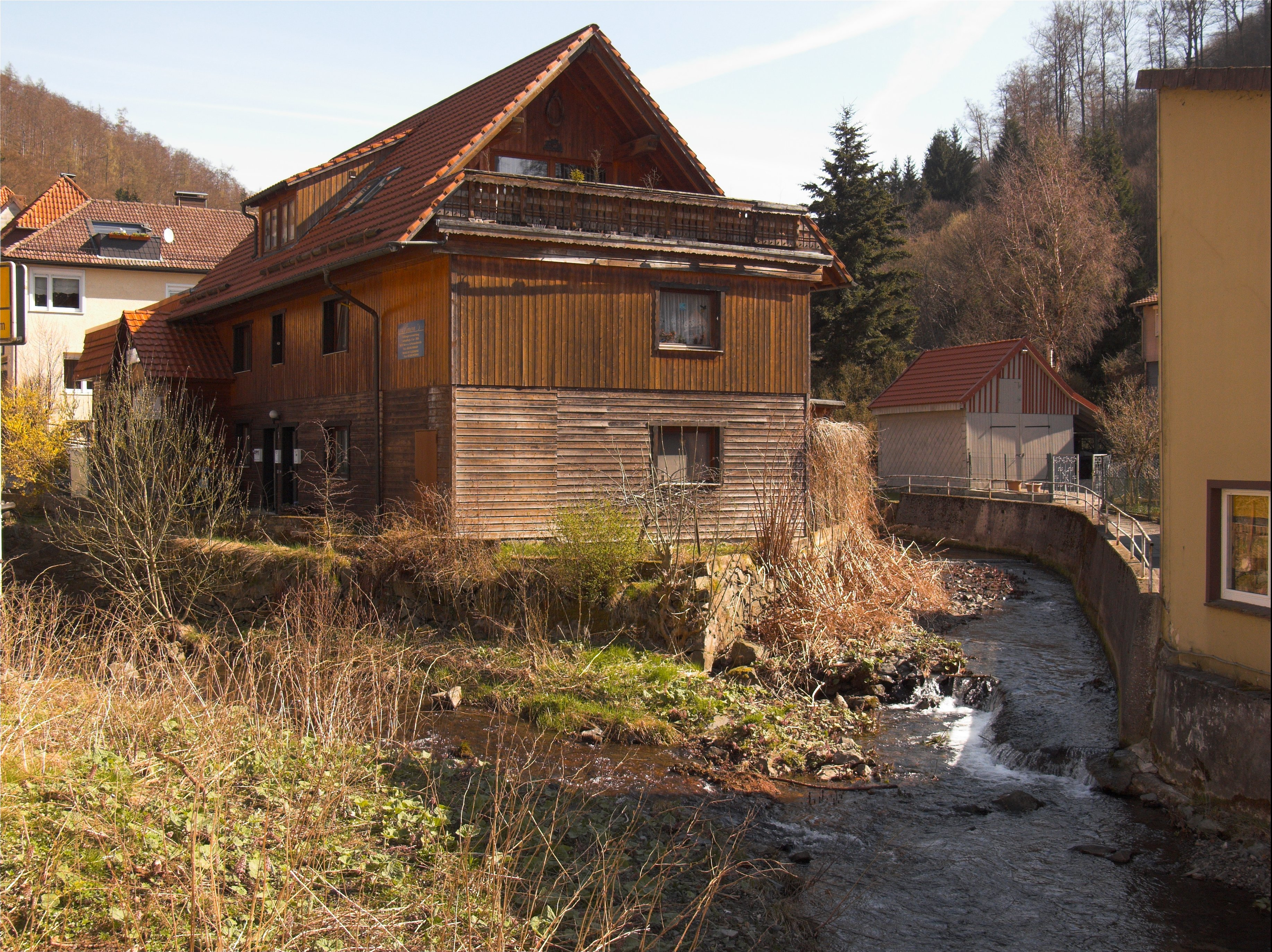
- Confluence of the Sprakelbach (left) and the Wolfsbach (right) to form the Zorge

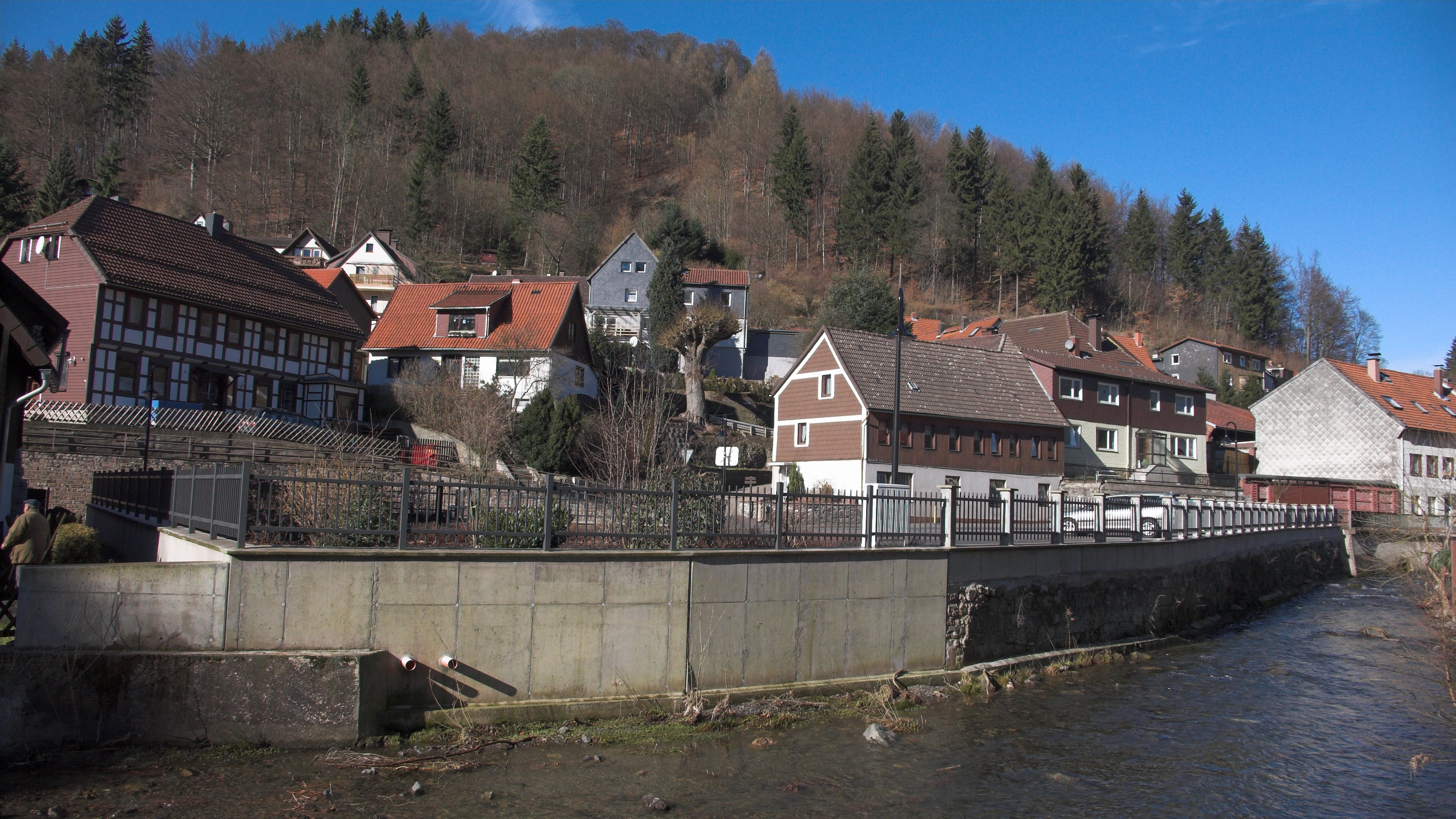
The Zorge en route through the village of the same name

The Zorge is a tributary of the Helme in central Germany. It is about 40 km (25 mi) long and flows from the state of Lower Saxony into Thuringia. In many sources the name Zorge is translated as "wild river".

== Course ==
The river starts in the village of the same name in the Harz Mountains at the confluence of the Wolfsbach and Sprakelsbach streams which meet in the middle of the upper part of the village at around 350 m above sea level (NN). It then flows in a southerly direction through Zorge and Ellrich to Nordhausen. The Zorge discharges into the Helme northeast of Heringen.

The headstreams of the Zorge, like other streams such as the Wieda, drain one of the rainiest regions of the Harz. The quantities of water it carries to the Helme are one of the reasons for the construction of the Kelbra Reservoir on the Helme.

== Tributaries ==
- Wolfsbach (left headstream)
- Sparakelbach (right headstream)
- Steigerwasser (right)
- Elsbach (left)
- Dörenbach (right)
- Illigesbach (right)
- Rosenbach (left)
- Sülze (left)
- Wieda (right)
- Bere (left)
- Kappelbach (left)
- Orbach (left)
- Gumpebach (left)
- Roßmannsbach (left)
- Leimbach (left)
- Krummbach (left)

== See also ==
- List of rivers of Lower Saxony
- List of rivers of Thuringia
