= Walkenried =

- Municipality
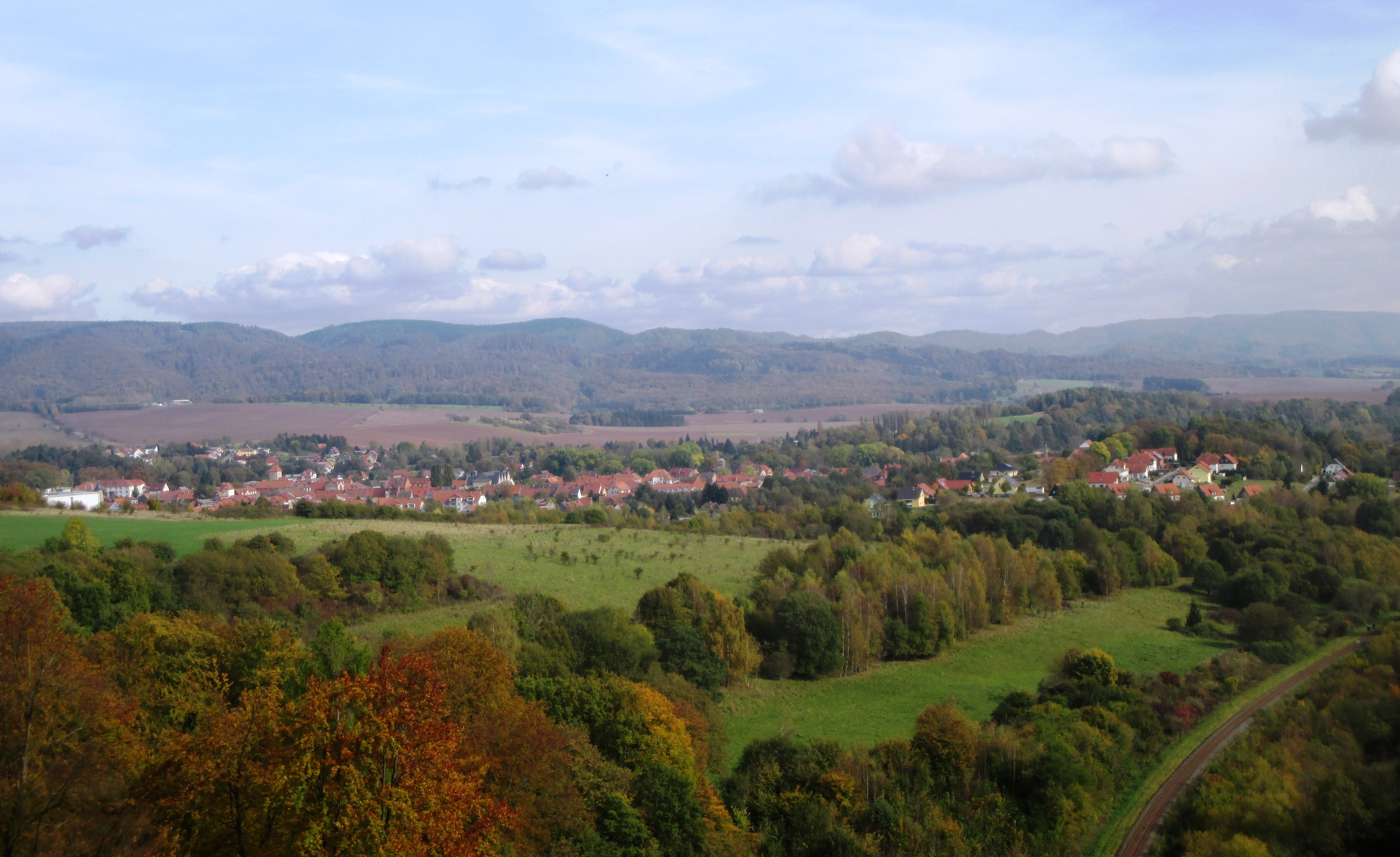

- Coat of arms

- Location of Walkenried within Göttingen district
- Interactive map of Walkenried
- Location within Germany Location within Lower Saxony
- Coordinates: 51°35′13″N 10°37′08″E
- Country: Germany
- State: Lower Saxony
- District: Göttingen
- Municipal assoc.: Walkenried

Government
  - Mayor (2021–26): Lars Deiters

Area
  - Total: 12.23 km^{2} (4.72 sq mi)
- Elevation: 275 m (902 ft)

Population (2025-12-31)
  - Total: 3,939
  - Density: 322.1/km^{2} (834.2/sq mi)
- Time zone: UTC+01:00 (CET)
  - Summer (DST): UTC+02:00 (CEST)
- Postal codes: 37445
- Dialling codes: 05525
- Vehicle registration: GÖ, OHA
- Website: www.walkenried-tourismus.de

Walkenried (German pronunciation: [valkənˈʁiːt]) is a municipality in the district of Göttingen, in Lower Saxony, Germany. It is situated in the southern Harz, approx. 15 km south of Braunlage, and 15 km northwest of Nordhausen.

Walkenried was the seat of the Samtgemeinde ("collective municipality") Walkenried, which was abolished in November 2016 when Wieda and Zorge were incorporated into the municipality.

The village is principally known as the location of Walkenried Abbey, the third Cistercian monastery established on German-speaking territory, founded in 1127 and secularised in 1668.

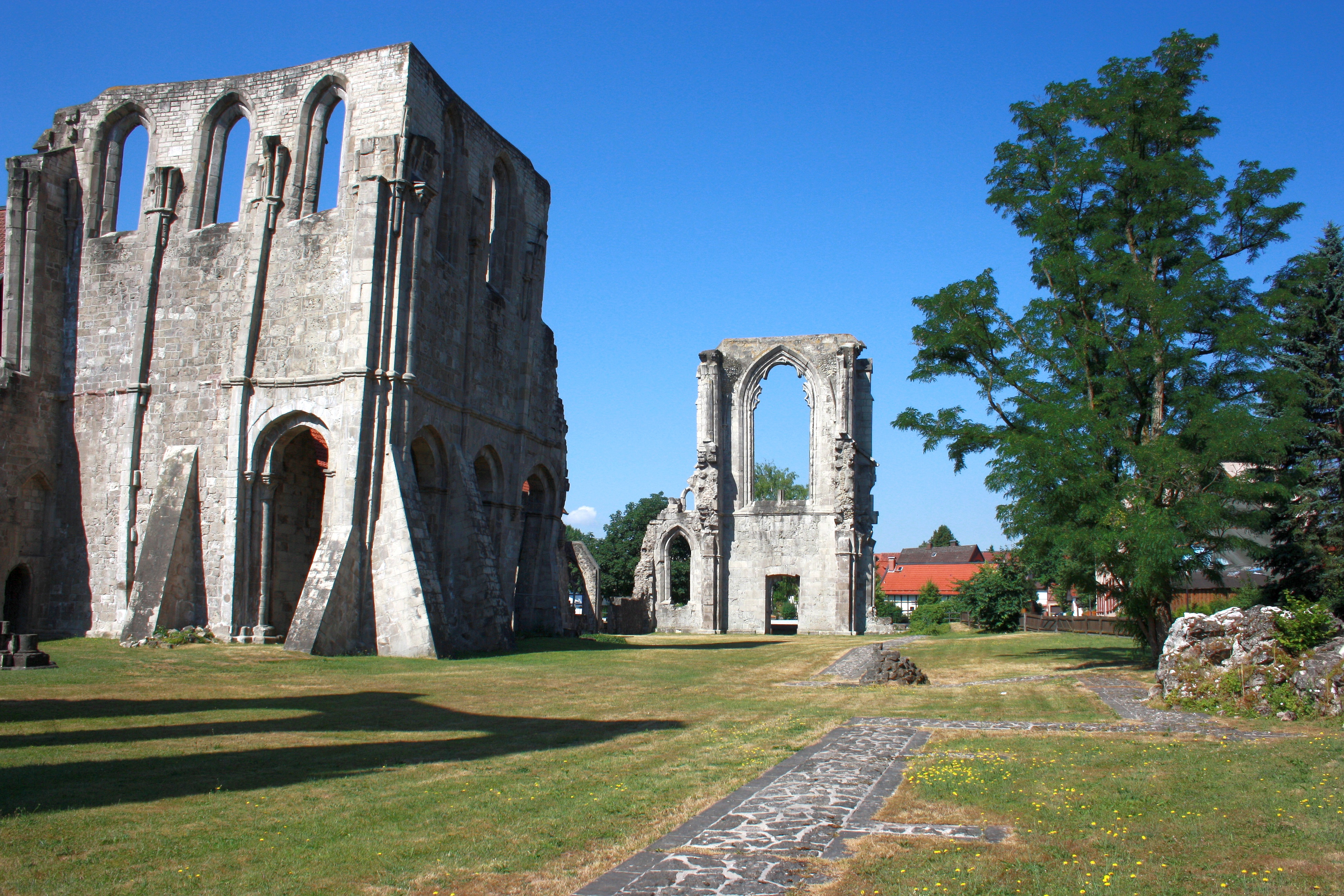
The former Abbey Walkenried

== History ==
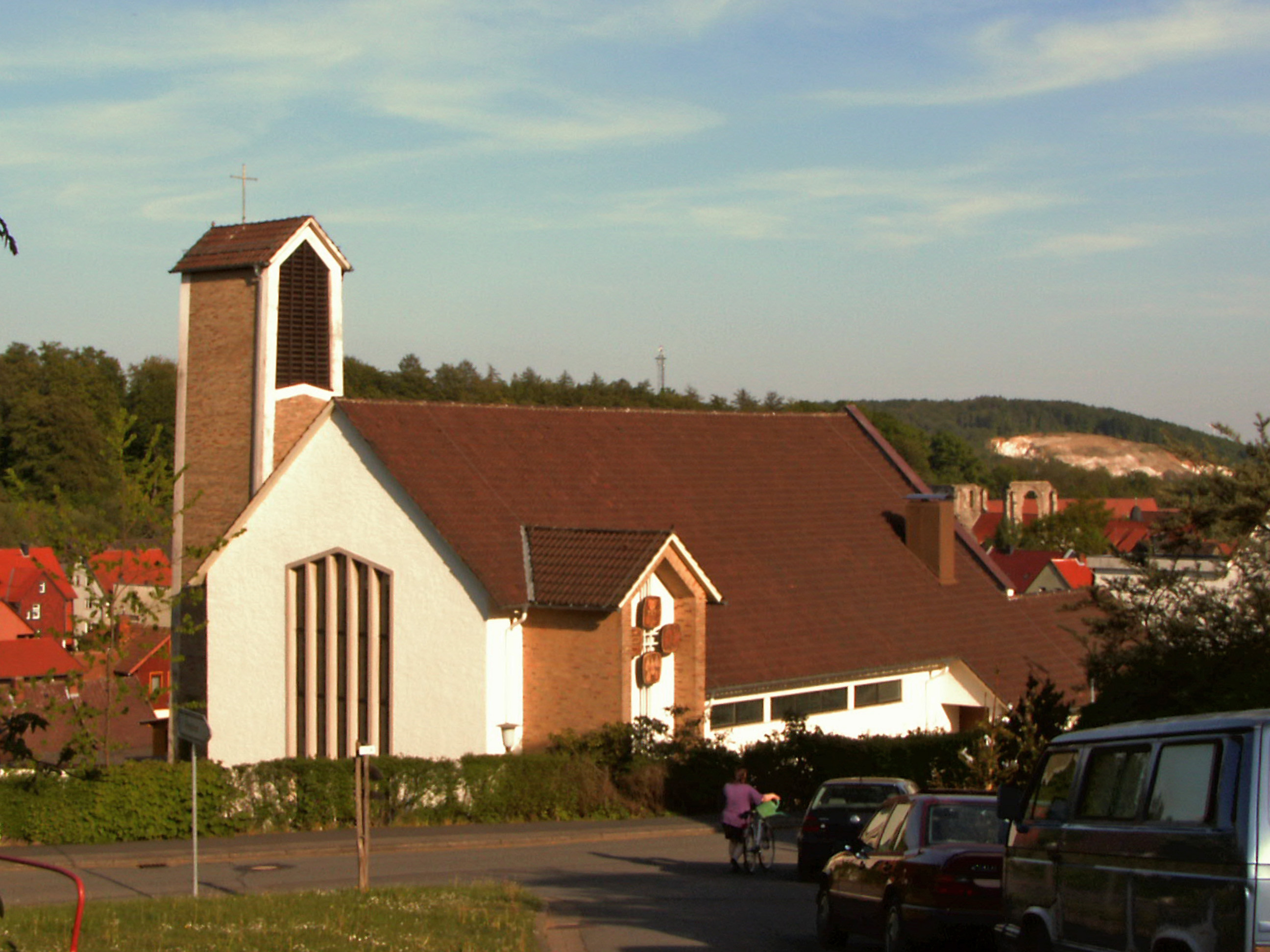
Holy Cross Church

The first documented mention of Walkenried dates from 1085. The historical center is the abbey built in 1127 by Cistercians. The originally forested Walkenried swamp landscape was expanded from 12th Century and converted into a pond landscape with fertile farmland by the monks of the abbey. 365 ponds are said to have been created by the monks in order, according to tradition, to have a pond available for fishing every day of the year. At least 50 of them are still in existence. All ponds are located in the Nature Reserve Priorteich/Sachsenstein. Some ponds are managed by local angling clubs.
