= Zorge, Walkenried =

Zorge
- Ortsteil of Walkenried
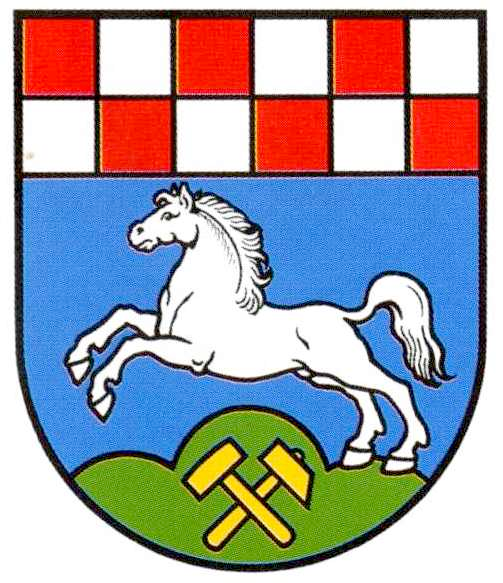
- Coat of arms
- Interactive map of Zorge
- Location within Germany Location within Lower Saxony
- Coordinates: 51°38′12″N 10°38′05″E
- Country: Germany
- State: Lower Saxony
- District: Göttingen
- Municipality: Walkenried

Area
  - Total: 2.21 km^{2} (0.85 sq mi)
- Elevation: 478 m (1,568 ft)

Population (2015-12-31)
  - Total: 984
  - Density: 445/km^{2} (1,150/sq mi)
- Time zone: UTC+01:00 (CET)
  - Summer (DST): UTC+02:00 (CEST)
- Postal codes: 37449
- Dialling codes: 05586
- Vehicle registration: GÖ, OHA

Zorge is a village and a former municipality in the district of Göttingen, in Lower Saxony, Germany. Since 1 November 2016 it has been part of the municipality of Walkenried. The river Zorge rises in the village.

== Sights ==
There is a good view of Zorge from the Pferdchen viewpoint, which is about 430 metres above sea level and is checkpoint 58 in the Harzer Wandernadel hiking network.

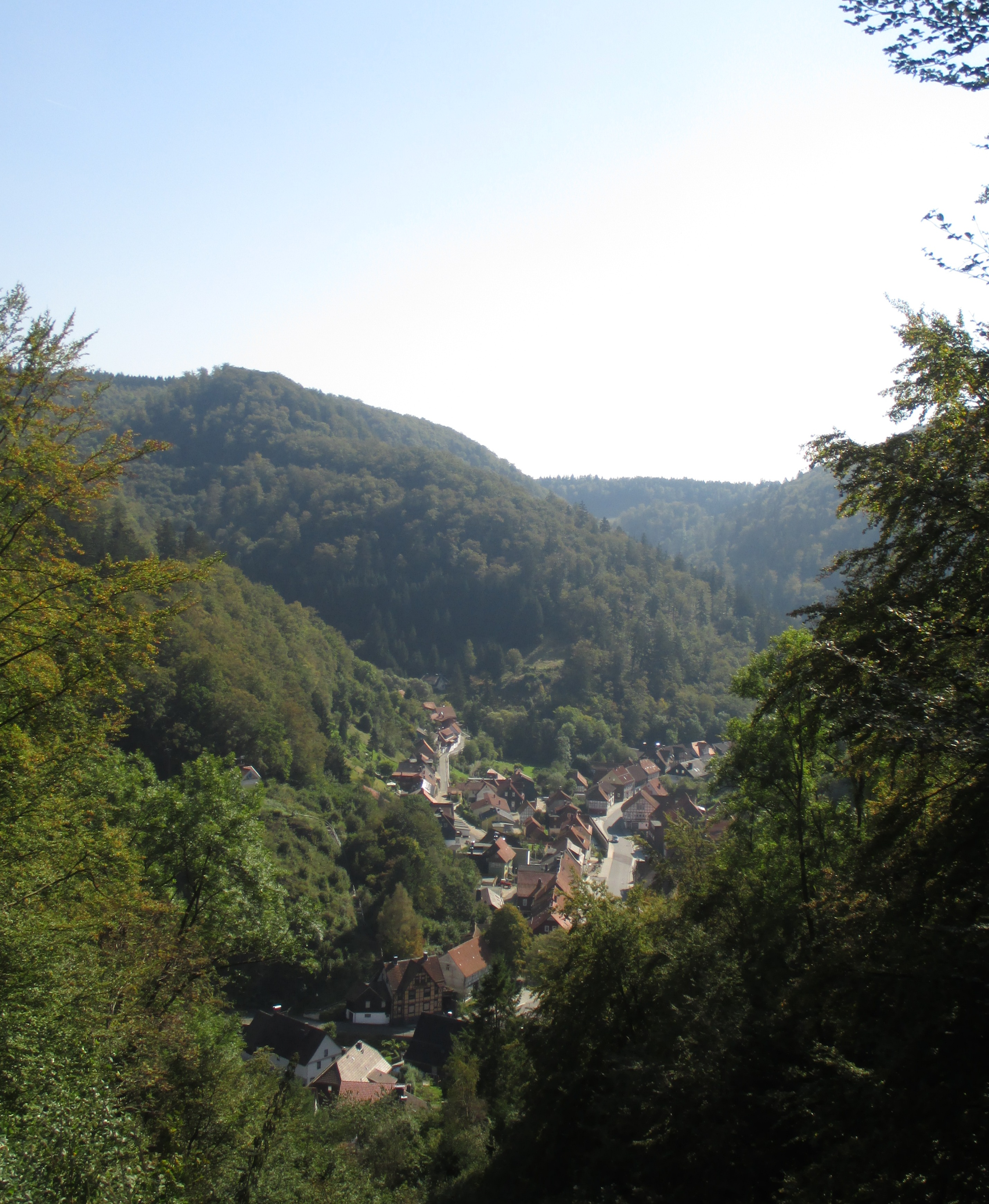
View of Zorge from the Pferdchen viewing point

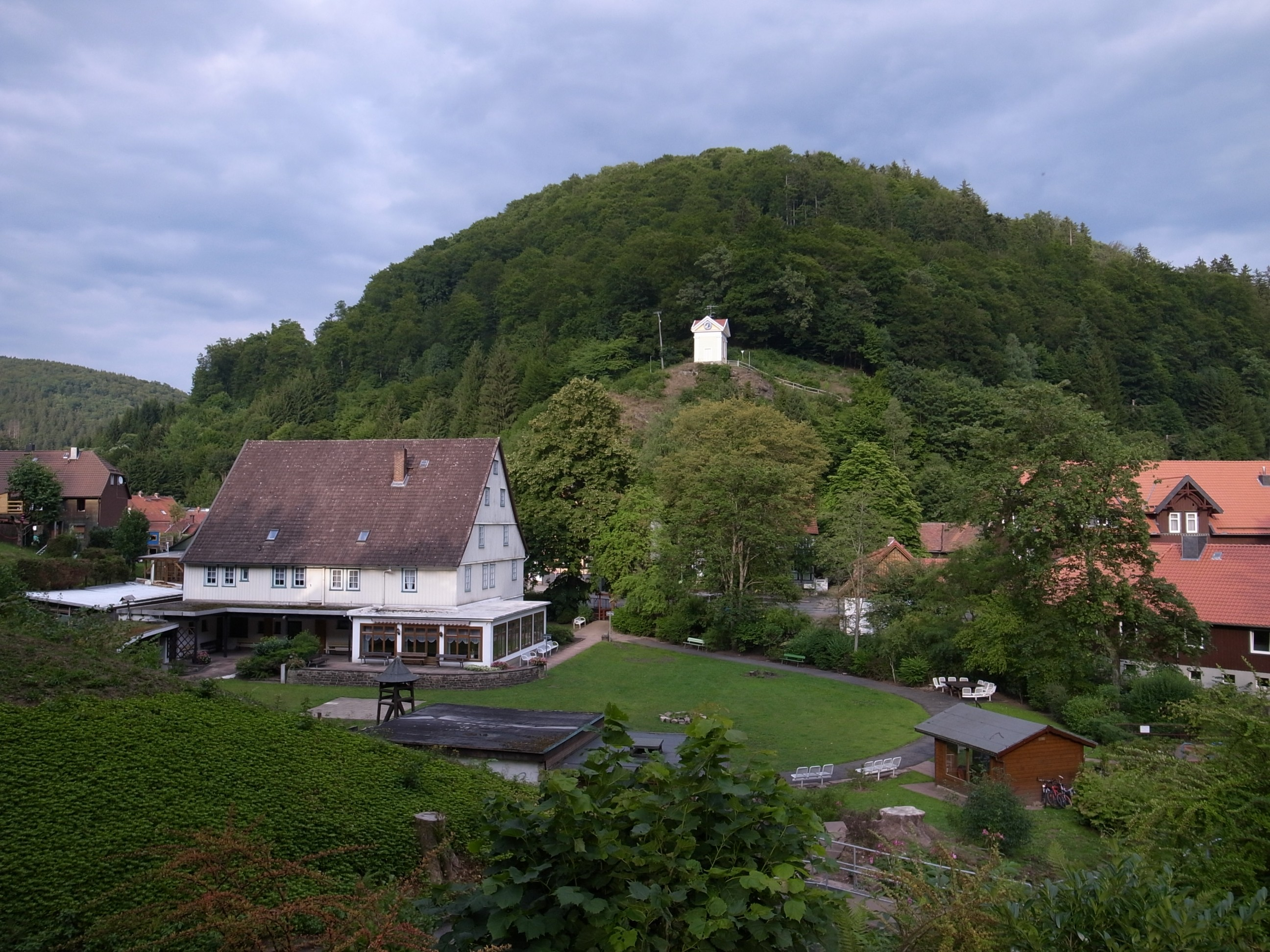
Museum and Bell tower
