= Hohnstein/Südharz =

Coordinates: 51°35′N 10°47′E

Hohnstein/Südharz is a former Verwaltungsgemeinschaft ("collective municipality") in the district of Nordhausen, in Thuringia, Germany. The seat of the Verwaltungsgemeinschaft was in Ilfeld (part of Harztor). It was disbanded in July 2018 and all member municipalities merged into the town of Harztor.

The Verwaltungsgemeinschaft Hohnstein/Südharz consisted of the following municipalities:

1. Buchholz
2. Harztor
3. Harzungen
4. Herrmannsacker
5. Neustadt/Harz
