= Hainleite (Verwaltungsgemeinschaft) =

Coordinates: 51.417°N 10.700°E

Hainleite is a former Verwaltungsgemeinschaft ("collective municipality") in the district of Nordhausen, in Thuringia, Germany. The seat of the Verwaltungsgemeinschaft was in Wolkramshausen. It was disbanded in January 2019.

The Verwaltungsgemeinschaft Hainleite consisted of the following municipalities:

1. Großlohra
2. Hainrode
3. Kleinfurra
4. Nohra
5. Wipperdorf
6. Wolkramshausen
