= Sandlünz =

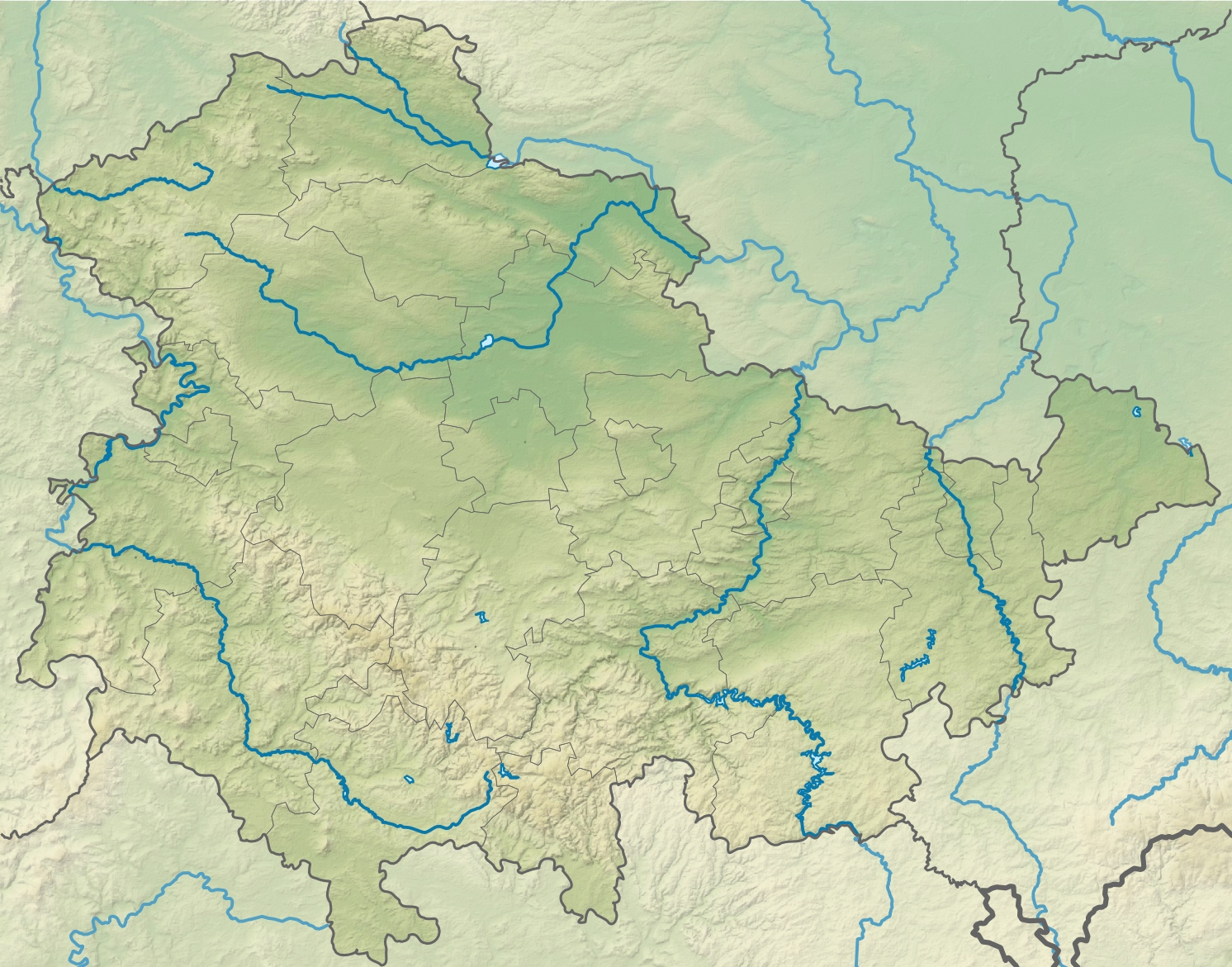
- Location within Thuringia

Highest point
- Elevation: 516.2 m above sea level (NN) (1,694 ft)
- Coordinates: 51°35′52″N 10°47′49″E

Geography
- Location: Nordhausen county, Thuringia, Germany
- Parent range: Harz Mountains (South Harz)

The Sandlünz is a hill in the Harz Mountains of Germany. It is 516.2 m above sea level (NN) and located near Netzkater in the county of Nordhausen in the state of Thuringia.

== Location ==
The Sandlünz lies in the South Harz within the South Harz Nature Park immediately southeast of Netzkater (ca. 312 m above NN), which belongs to Ilfeld in the municipality of Harztor. It rises above the valley of the Bere stream, into which the Brandesbach empties, north of the wooded hill, and the Schuppenbach to the west of it. The northern and northwestern flanks of the Sandlünz are part of the Brandesbachtal nature reserve. Towards the southeast, the countryside transitions to the hills of Rabenkopf (547.4 m) and Poppenberg (600.6 m). To the south is the hill spur of Herzberg with its rock formation, the Gänseschnabel ("Goose Beak"). Its western neighbour on the far side of the Bere is the Netzberg, where the Dühringsklippe crags are found (504.8 m).

== Dreitälerblick ==
On the northwest flank of the Sandlünz, above Netzkater, is the viewing point known as Dreitälerblick or "Three Valleys View" (ca. 420 m above NN) that, like the summit of the Sandlünz, is only accessible on woodland paths, for example from the Bere valley. It is no. 93 in the system of checkpoints in the Harzer Wandernadel hiking network; the checkpoint box being located just under 50 metres east—southeast of Dreitälerblick immediately next to a refuge hut (ca. 440 m above NN – 51°36′4.65″N 10°47′32.88″E). From the viewing point, there are vistas of the "Cold Valley" (Kalte Tal) to the northwest, the Ilfeld Valley running roughly north to south, with the Bere in the north and the Brandesbach valley in the east. The Bere lies below the Dreitälerblick at 307.1 m above NN.

== Rabensteiner Stollen ==
On the northwest slopes of the Sandlünz, east of the Rabenstein ("Raven Rock") and above the Bere stream, is the Rabensteiner Stollen, a former underground mine and only coal mine in the extensive mining history of the Harz. It operated from 1737 to 1949 and has been a visitor mine since 1981.
