= Osterode, Harztor =

Osterode
- Village of Harztor
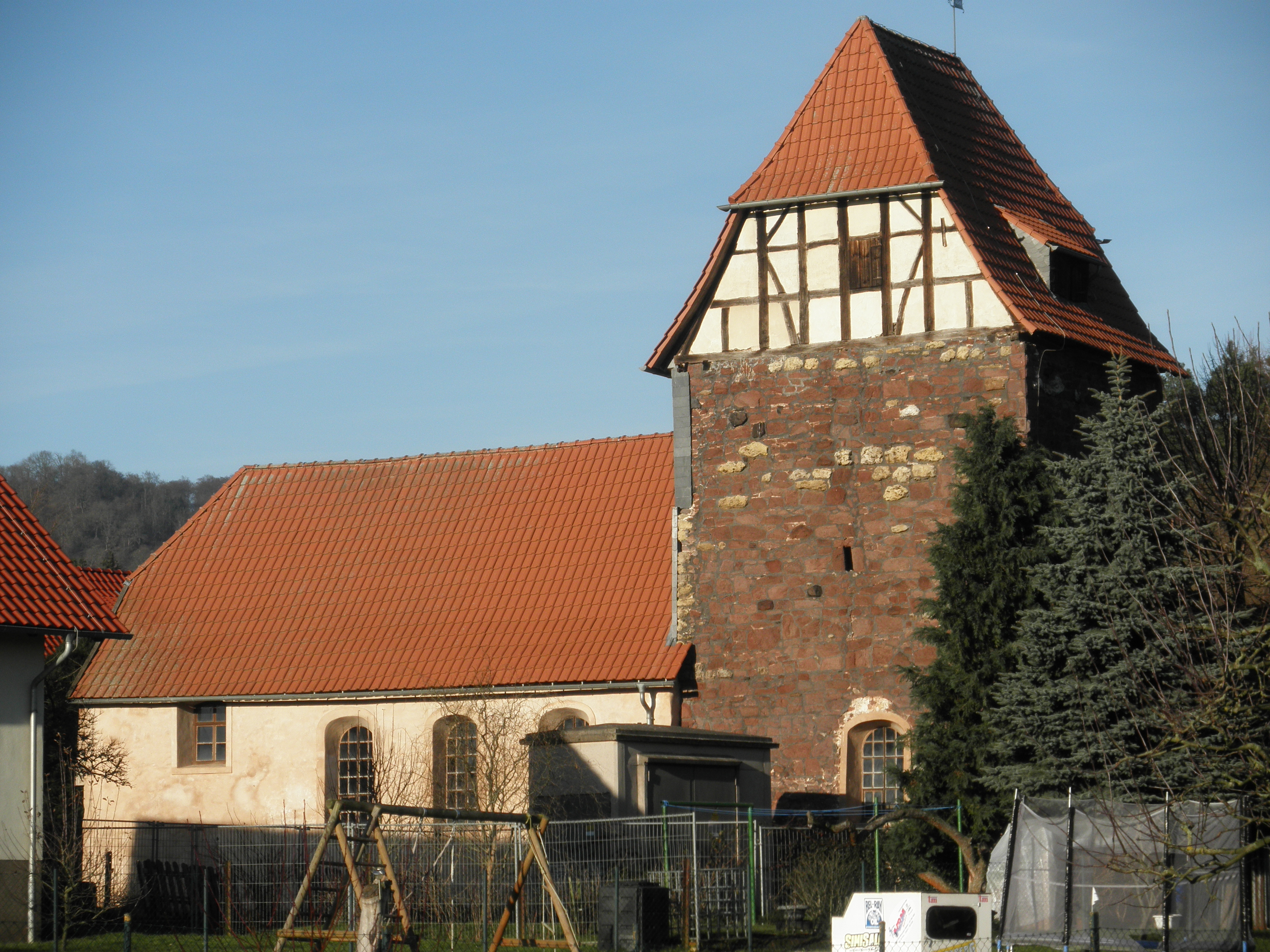
- St. Juliana Church
- Interactive map of Osterode
- Location within Germany Location within Thuringia
- Coordinates: 51.56501°N 10.81775°E
- Country: Germany
- State: Thuringia
- District: Nordhausen
- Municipality: Harztor
- Elevation: 263 m (863 ft)

Population
  - Metro: 250
- Time zone: UTC+01:00 (CET)
  - Summer (DST): UTC+02:00 (CEST)
- Dialling codes: 036331
- Vehicle registration: 99768

Osterode is a German village (Ortsteil) in the municipality of Harztor in the district of Nordhausen, Thuringia. It is located approximately 1 kilometer northwest of Neustadt/Harz.

== History ==
The small village was first mentioned in documents dating from 1216. There was a manor and a parson active in the village since the 13th century. At the beginning of the 13th century, a fortified church was built, to whose tower the current church was added in 1759. There was a charcoal kiln until the 21st century. In 1952, the village was incorporated into the former municipality of Neustadt/Harz which in turn merged to form the new municipality of Harztor on 1 January 2012.
