= Sophienhof (Harztor) =

- Village of Harztor
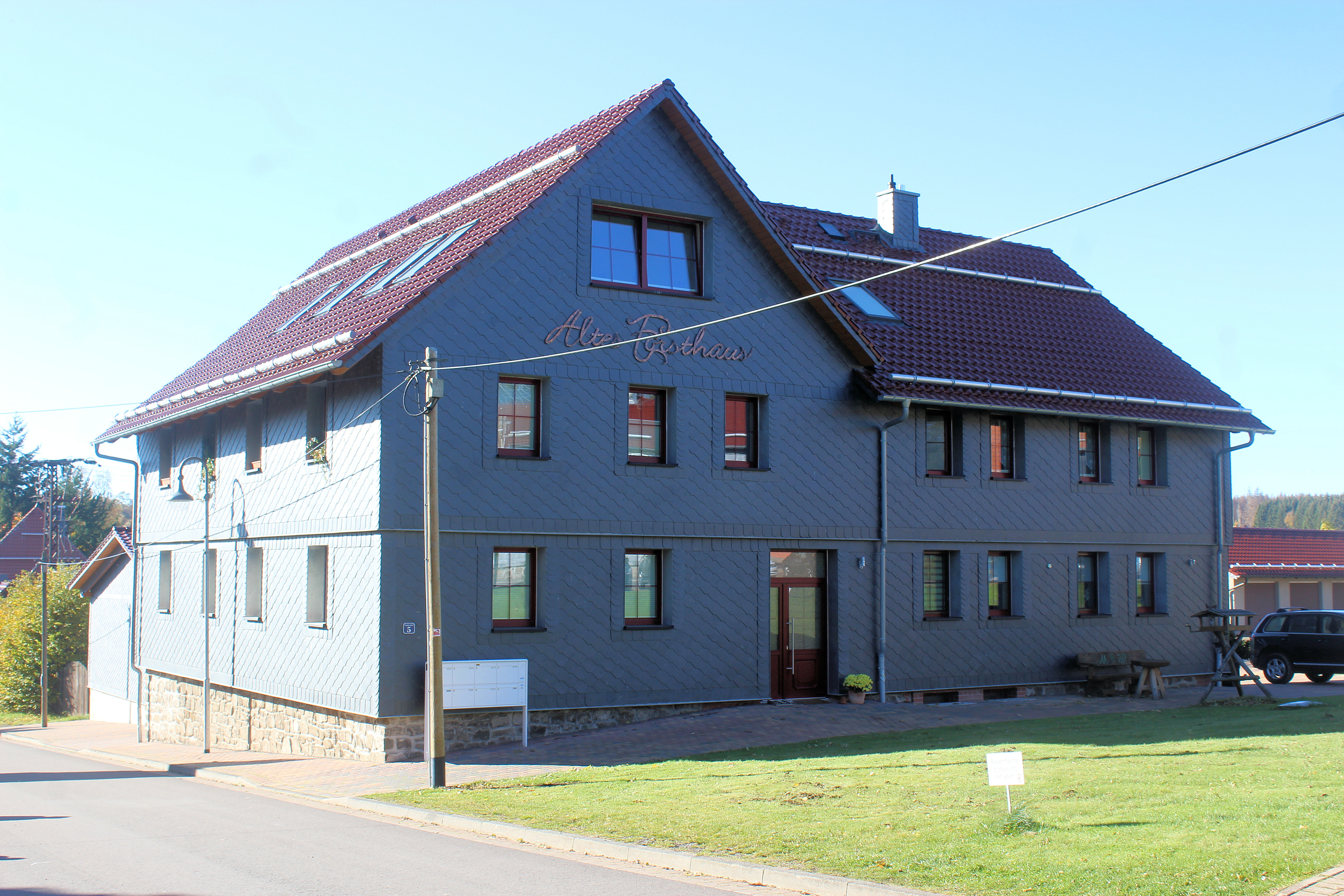
- Alte Forsthaus
- Interactive map of Sophienhof
- Location within Germany Location within Thuringia
- Country: Germany
- State: Thuringia
- District: Nordhausen
- Municipality: Harztor
- Elevation: 534 m (1,752 ft)

Population
  - Metro: 50
- Time zone: UTC+01:00 (CET)
  - Summer (DST): UTC+02:00 (CEST)
- Dialling codes: 036331
- Vehicle registration: 99768

Sophienhof is a village in the municipality of Harztor in the district of Nordhausen in the German federal state of Thuringia. It is located approximately 6 kilometers to the north of Ilfeld.

== Location ==
Sophienhof is situated in the so-called Hohnstein Forest (Hohnsteiner Forst), that once belonged to the counts of Stolberg, in northwest Thuringia only a few kilometres away from the state borders with Saxony-Anhalt and Lower Saxony. The village is only accessible by motor vehicles over a secondary road from Rothesütte or from the B 81 federal road between Hasselfelde and Ilfeld. In addition, several walking trails run from surrounding villages to Sophienhof.

Sophienhof has a halt on the Harz Railway, which is located in the forest to the west outside the village. There is also a Harzer Wandernadel hiking checkpoint (no. 97) in the village by the Ziegenalm cafe.

== History ==
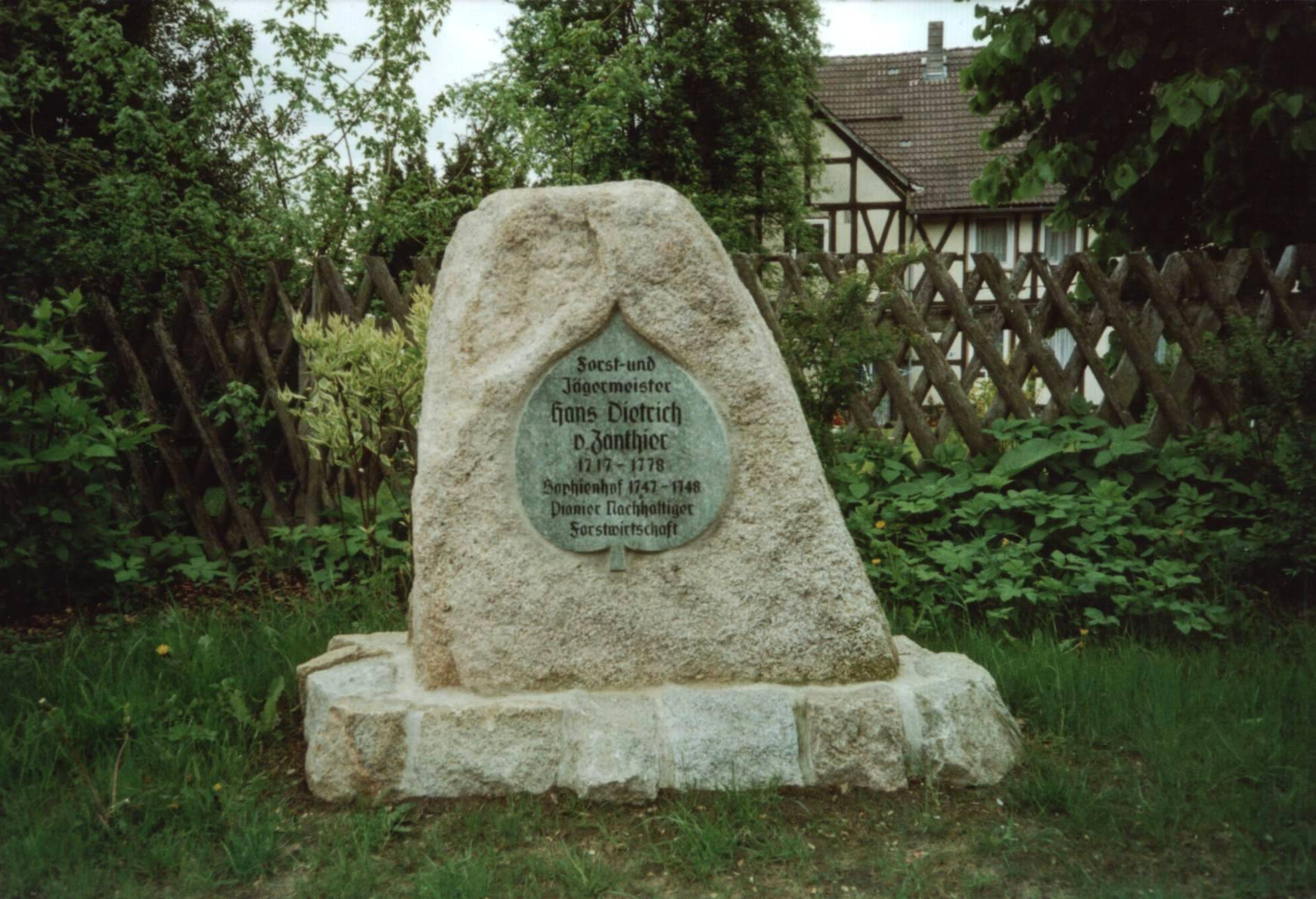
The Zanthier Stone in memory of Hans Dietrich von Zanthier in Sophienhof

The village was probably established in the 17th century from a collection of foresters' huts and was first mentioned in 1645 (under another name). In 1710, Count Christian Ernest of Stolberg-Wernigerode inherited the County of Wernigerode and Hohnstein Forest. In 1712, he married Sophie Charlotte Countess zu Leiningen-Westerburg, after whom the village was renamed in 1720, having previously been called Schmerplatz. After a preaching sites had been established in 1734 in Rothesütte and Sophienhof, a small church was built in Sophienhof which, like the church in neighbouring Rothesütte fell into ruins due to its proximity to the Inner German Border and was torn down in the 1960s. Its bell, cast in 1742, has survived and is located in a bell cradle on the cemetery. In 1747, Hans Dietrich von Zanthier was appointed as the comital Master Forester and Master Hunter with his work residence in Sophienhof. He is commemorated by a memorial rock.

Sophienhof was incorporated in 1972 into the municipality of Ilfeld. Since 1 January 2012, Ilfeld has been part of the newly formed Harztor municipality.
