= Uhřice =

Uhřice may refer to places in the Czech Republic:

- Uhřice (Blansko District), a municipality and village in the South Moravian Region
- Uhřice (Hodonín District), a municipality and village in the South Moravian Region
- Uhřice (Kroměříž District), a municipality and village in the Zlín Region
- Uhřice (Vyškov District), a municipality and village in the South Moravian Region
- Uhřice, a village and part of Sedlec-Prčice in the Central Bohemian Region
- Uhřice, a village and part of Vlachovo Březí in the South Bohemian Region
