= Friedrichsthal (disambiguation) =

Friedrichsthal is Saarland in Germany.

Friedrichsthal may also refer to:

- Friedrichsthal, Thuringia, in Germany
- Narsaq Kujalleq, in Greenland, formerly known as Friedrichsthal
- Emanuel von Friedrichsthal (1809–1842), Austrian botanist and archaeologist
