= Niedersachswerfen =

- Ortsteil of Harztor
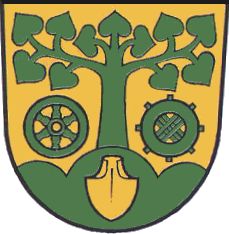
- Coat of arms
- Interactive map of Niedersachswerfen
- Location within Germany Location within Thuringia
- Coordinates: 51°33′14″N 10°45′55″E
- Country: Germany
- State: Thuringia
- District: Nordhausen
- Municipality: Harztor

Area
  - Total: 11.79 km^{2} (4.55 sq mi)
- Elevation: 210 m (690 ft)

Population (2010-12-31)
  - Total: 3,257
  - Density: 276.3/km^{2} (715.5/sq mi)
- Time zone: UTC+01:00 (CET)
  - Summer (DST): UTC+02:00 (CEST)
- Postal codes: 99762
- Dialling codes: 036331
- Vehicle registration: NDH
- Website: www.niedersachswerfen.de

Niedersachswerfen is a village and a former municipality in the district of Nordhausen, in Thuringia, Germany. Since 1 January 2012, it is part of the municipality Harztor.
