= Obergebra =

- Village of Bleicherode
- Interactive map of Obergebra
- Location within Germany Location within Thuringia
- Coordinates: 51°25′N 10°35′E
- Country: Germany
- State: Thuringia
- District: Nordhausen
- Town: Bleicherode

Area
  - Total: 7.84 km^{2} (3.03 sq mi)
- Elevation: 255 m (837 ft)

Population (2006-12-31)
  - Total: 862
  - Density: 110/km^{2} (285/sq mi)
- Time zone: UTC+01:00 (CET)
  - Summer (DST): UTC+02:00 (CEST)
- Postal codes: 99759
- Dialling codes: 036338

Obergebra is a former municipality in the district of Nordhausen, in Thuringia, Germany. Since 1 December 2007, it is part of the town Bleicherode.
