= Etzelsrode =

- Ortsteil of Bleicherode
- Interactive map of Etzelsrode
- Location within Germany Location within Thuringia
- Coordinates: 51°30′N 10°37′E
- Country: Germany
- State: Thuringia
- District: Nordhausen
- Town: Bleicherode

Area
  - Total: 3.56 km^{2} (1.37 sq mi)
- Elevation: 224 m (735 ft)

Population (2017-12-31)
  - Total: 88
  - Density: 25/km^{2} (64/sq mi)
- Time zone: UTC+01:00 (CET)
  - Summer (DST): UTC+02:00 (CEST)
- Postal codes: 99735
- Dialling codes: 036337

Etzelsrode (German pronunciation: [ɛtsl̩sˈʁoːdə]) is a village and a former municipality in the district of Nordhausen, in Thuringia, Germany. Since 1 January 2019, it is part of the town Bleicherode.
