= Görsbach =

- Municipality
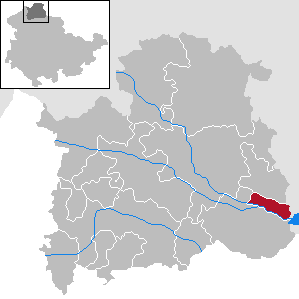
- Location of Görsbach within Nordhausen district
- Interactive map of Görsbach
- Location within Germany Location within Thuringia
- Coordinates: 51°27′47″N 10°56′6″E
- Country: Germany
- State: Thuringia
- District: Nordhausen

Government
  - Mayor (2022–28): Angela Simmen

Area
  - Total: 9.05 km^{2} (3.49 sq mi)
- Elevation: 154 m (505 ft)

Population (2025-12-31)
  - Total: 947
  - Density: 105/km^{2} (271/sq mi)
- Time zone: UTC+01:00 (CET)
  - Summer (DST): UTC+02:00 (CEST)
- Postal codes: 99765
- Dialling codes: 036333
- Vehicle registration: NDH

Görsbach is a municipality in the district of Nordhausen, in Thuringia, Germany.
