= Kleinfurra =

- Municipality
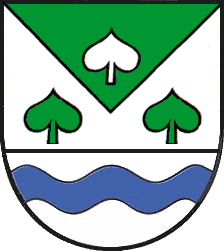
- Coat of arms

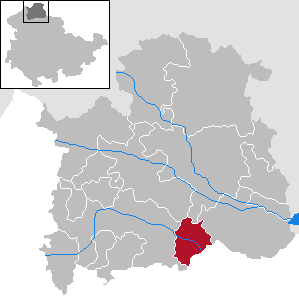
- Location of Kleinfurra within Nordhausen district
- Interactive map of Kleinfurra
- Location within Germany Location within Thuringia
- Coordinates: 51°24′N 10°46′E
- Country: Germany
- State: Thuringia
- District: Nordhausen
- Municipal assoc.: Hainleite

Government
  - Mayor (2022–28): Thomas Günzelmann

Area
  - Total: 18.51 km^{2} (7.15 sq mi)
- Elevation: 205 m (673 ft)

Population (2025-12-31)
  - Total: 980
  - Density: 53/km^{2} (140/sq mi)
- Time zone: UTC+01:00 (CET)
  - Summer (DST): UTC+02:00 (CEST)
- Postal codes: 99735
- Dialling codes: 036334
- Vehicle registration: NDH
- Website: www.vg-hainleite.de

Kleinfurra is a municipality in the district of Nordhausen, in Thuringia, Germany.
