= Friedrichsthal, Thuringia =

Friedrichsthal
- Ortsteil of Bleicherode
- Interactive map of Friedrichsthal
- Location within Germany Location within Thuringia
- Coordinates: 51°30′15″N 10°35′30″E
- Country: Germany
- State: Thuringia
- District: Nordhausen
- Town: Bleicherode

Area
  - Total: 12.34 km^{2} (4.76 sq mi)
- Elevation: 220 m (720 ft)

Population (2017-12-31)
  - Total: 220
  - Density: 18/km^{2} (46/sq mi)
- Time zone: UTC+01:00 (CET)
  - Summer (DST): UTC+02:00 (CEST)
- Postal codes: 99735
- Dialling codes: 036337
- Vehicle registration: NDH

Friedrichsthal (German pronunciation: [ˈfʁiːdʁɪçsˌtaːl]) is a village and a former municipality in the district of Nordhausen, in Thuringia, Germany. Since 1 January 2019, it is part of the town Bleicherode.
