= Wipperdorf =

- Ortsteil of Bleicherode
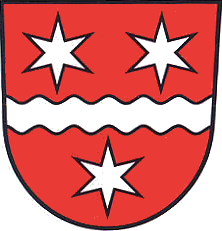
- Coat of arms
- Interactive map of Wipperdorf
- Location within Germany Location within Thuringia
- Coordinates: 51°27′N 10°40′E
- Country: Germany
- State: Thuringia
- District: Nordhausen
- Town: Bleicherode
- Subdivisions: 3

Area
  - Total: 18.31 km^{2} (7.07 sq mi)
- Elevation: 210 m (690 ft)

Population (2017-12-31)
  - Total: 1,368
  - Density: 74.71/km^{2} (193.5/sq mi)
- Time zone: UTC+01:00 (CET)
  - Summer (DST): UTC+02:00 (CEST)
- Postal codes: 99752
- Dialling codes: 036338
- Website: www.wipperdorf.de

Wipperdorf (German pronunciation: [ˈvɪpɐdɔʁf]) is a village and a former municipality in the district of Nordhausen, in Thuringia, Germany. Since 1 January 2019, it is part of the town Bleicherode.

== People ==
- Walther Schreiber (1884-1958), German politician
