= Nohra, Thuringia =

Nohra
- Ortsteil of Bleicherode
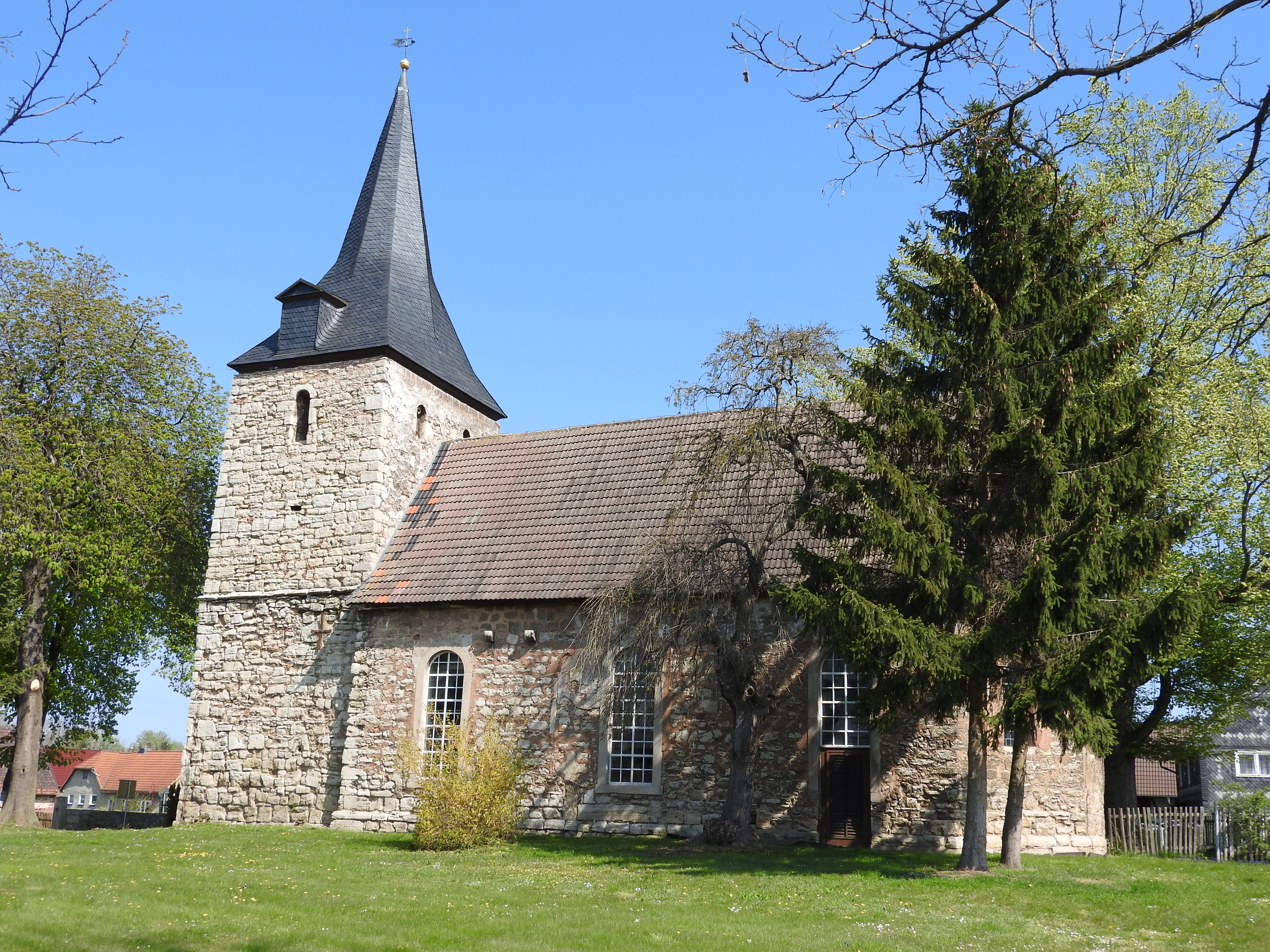

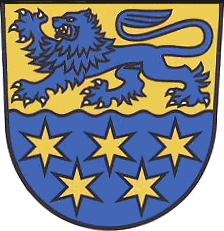
- Coat of arms
- Interactive map of Nohra
- Location within Germany Location within Thuringia
- Coordinates: 51°26′N 10°42′E
- Country: Germany
- State: Thuringia
- District: Nordhausen
- Town: Bleicherode

Area
  - Total: 16.21 km^{2} (6.26 sq mi)
- Elevation: 212 m (696 ft)

Population (2017-12-31)
  - Total: 811
  - Density: 50.0/km^{2} (130/sq mi)
- Time zone: UTC+01:00 (CET)
  - Summer (DST): UTC+02:00 (CEST)
- Postal codes: 99735
- Dialling codes: 036334

Nohra (German pronunciation: [ˈnoːʁa]) is a village and a former municipality in the district of Nordhausen, in Thuringia, Germany. As of 2018, Nohra had a population of 799.

Nohra was first mentioned on 9 January 1152.

Since 1 January 2019, it is part of the town of Bleicherode.
