= Friedrich von Wurmb =

German botanist (1742–1781)

Christoph Carl Friedrich von Wurmb (2 July 1742 in Wolkramshausen – March 1781 in Batavia) was a German botanist. His official shorthand is "Wurmb". He was a descendant of the noble family von Wurmb. At some point in time, his elder brother Ludwig and he himself fell in love with the same woman. After a long decision process, he decided to emigrate, and leave the woman to his brother. He joined the Dutch East India Company, and emigrated to Amsterdam, and later to Batavia, the modern-day Jakarta. His brother later married this woman, Christiane von Werthern. His sister's brother in law, Friedrich Schiller, wrote a short story about it, A magnanimous act (Eine Grossmütige Handlung).

In biology, he is known for his taxonomy of palm trees. and for his writing about a Bornean orangutan.

The genus Wurmbea in the family Colchicaceae is named after him.
