= Harzungen =

- Ortsteil of Harztor
- Interactive map of Harzungen
- Location within Germany Location within Thuringia
- Coordinates: 51°32′N 10°48′E
- Country: Germany
- State: Thuringia
- District: Nordhausen
- Municipality: Harztor

Area
  - Total: 3.86 km^{2} (1.49 sq mi)
- Elevation: 224 m (735 ft)

Population (2016-12-31)
  - Total: 202
  - Density: 52.3/km^{2} (136/sq mi)
- Time zone: UTC+01:00 (CET)
  - Summer (DST): UTC+02:00 (CEST)
- Postal codes: 99762
- Dialling codes: 036331

Harzungen (German pronunciation: [ˈhaʁtsʊŋən]) is a village and a former municipality in the district of Nordhausen, in Thuringia, Germany. Since July 2018, it is part of the municipality Harztor.

During World War II a concentration camp with 4000 inmates was built in this city. It was a subcamp of Mittelbau-Dora, which was itself a subcamp of the Buchenwald concentration camp.
