= Wolkramshausen =

- Ortsteil of Bleicherode
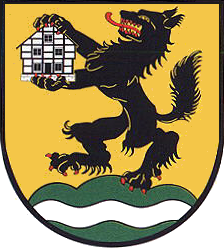
- Coat of arms
- Interactive map of Wolkramshausen
- Location within Germany Location within Thuringia
- Coordinates: 51°25′40″N 10°45′0″E
- Country: Germany
- State: Thuringia
- District: Nordhausen
- Town: Bleicherode

Area
  - Total: 10.84 km^{2} (4.19 sq mi)
- Elevation: 206 m (676 ft)

Population (2017-12-31)
  - Total: 936
  - Density: 86.3/km^{2} (224/sq mi)
- Time zone: UTC+01:00 (CET)
  - Summer (DST): UTC+02:00 (CEST)
- Postal codes: 99735
- Dialling codes: 036334
- Vehicle registration: NDH
- Website: www.wolkramshausen.de

Wolkramshausen (German pronunciation: [vɔlkʁamsˈhaʊzn̩]) is a village and a former municipality in the district of Nordhausen, in Thuringia, Germany. Since 1 January 2019, it is part of the town Bleicherode.

== People ==
- Friedrich von Wurmb (1742–1781), German botanist
- Robert Hue de Grais (1835–1922), German politician, member of Prussian lower house
