= Großlohra =

- Municipality
- Coat of arms

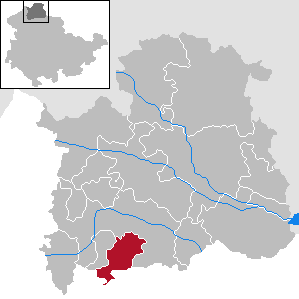
- Location of Großlohra within Nordhausen district
- Interactive map of Großlohra
- Location within Germany Location within Thuringia
- Coordinates: 51°25′N 10°39′E
- Country: Germany
- State: Thuringia
- District: Nordhausen
- Municipal assoc.: Hainleite

Government
  - Mayor (2020–26): Gerald Grabe

Area
  - Total: 18.29 km^{2} (7.06 sq mi)
- Elevation: 310 m (1,020 ft)

Population (2025-12-31)
  - Total: 821
  - Density: 44.9/km^{2} (116/sq mi)
- Time zone: UTC+01:00 (CET)
  - Summer (DST): UTC+02:00 (CEST)
- Postal codes: 99759
- Dialling codes: 036338
- Vehicle registration: NDH

Großlohra is a municipality in the district of Nordhausen, in Thuringia, Germany, situated on the northern edge of the Hainleite ridge about 20 km (12 mi) southwest of the district capital. It consists of the settlements of Friedrichslohra, Großwenden, Kleinwenden, as well as Münchenlohra with its former convent basilica St. Gangulphus and castle Lohra with its accompanying manor (Amt Lohra), all of which were united in 1950.

== Geography ==
Castle Lohra overlooks the gap between the Dün and Hainleite ridges, being situated on the northwesternmost spur of the latter. Historically, it guarded an important connection between Mühlhausen and the Halle-Kassel trade route in the Wipper valley, whose current incarnation is the Bundesautobahn 38. It was also a strategically important vantage point overlooking the plains between Hainleite and Harz.

== History ==
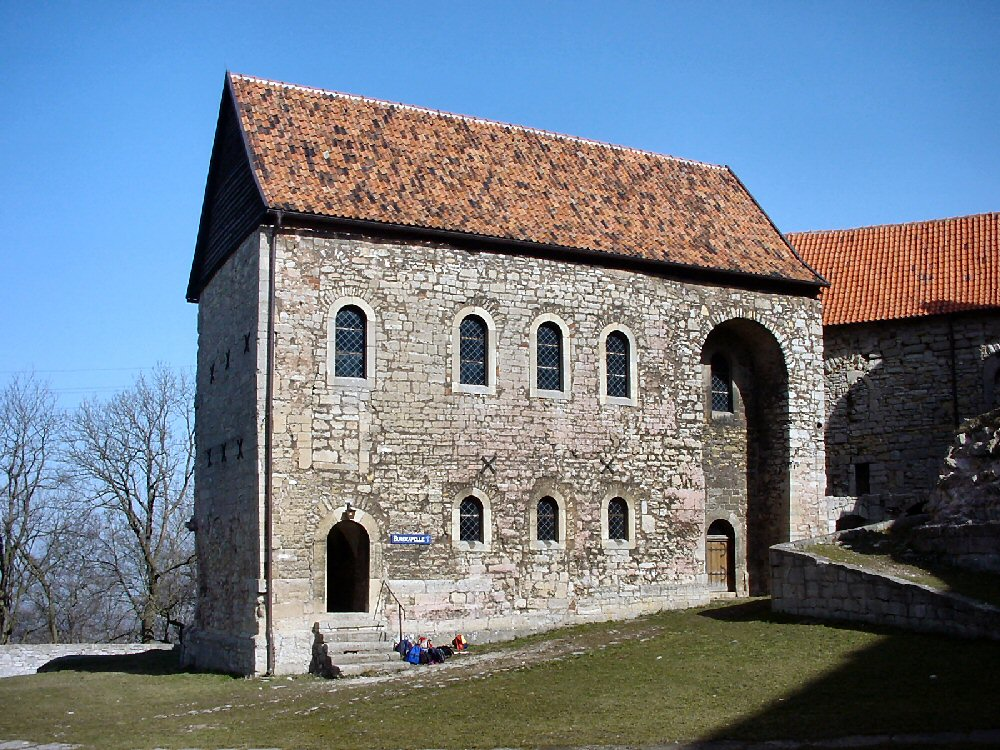
The double chapel at castle Lohra, consisting of two separate prayer rooms on the upper and lower floor

The site of castle Lohra had presumably already been fortified in Germanic times, being named after a possible nearby sanctuary to the goddess Lare. The complex was extended by the counts of Lare in the 11th and 12th centuries who constructed the largest castle in the southwestern foothills of the Harz mountains. The castle had varying owners until the 17th century, belonging to the counts of Lare, Beichlingen and Hohnstein. After the extinction of the latter family in 1593, the castle was to be inherited by the counts of Stolberg and Schwarzburg due to an arrangement between these families and the Hohnsteins, but was forcibly taken by the duke of Braunschweig. During the Thirty Years War, control of the castle changed several times. At the time of the Peace of Westphalia, it was occupied by the Swedes, but given to the electors of Brandenburg. In later times, the castle had lost its military significance and served as an agricultural domain in Prussia, the German Empire and the German Democratic Republic until 1977. Today, it is held by a non-profit organisation which rents the residential quarters to tourist groups and oversees the conservation and restoration of the castle. A special architectural feature is the double chapel, containing a chapel for public services on the lower floor and an additional oratory for private worship of the ruling family on the upper floor.

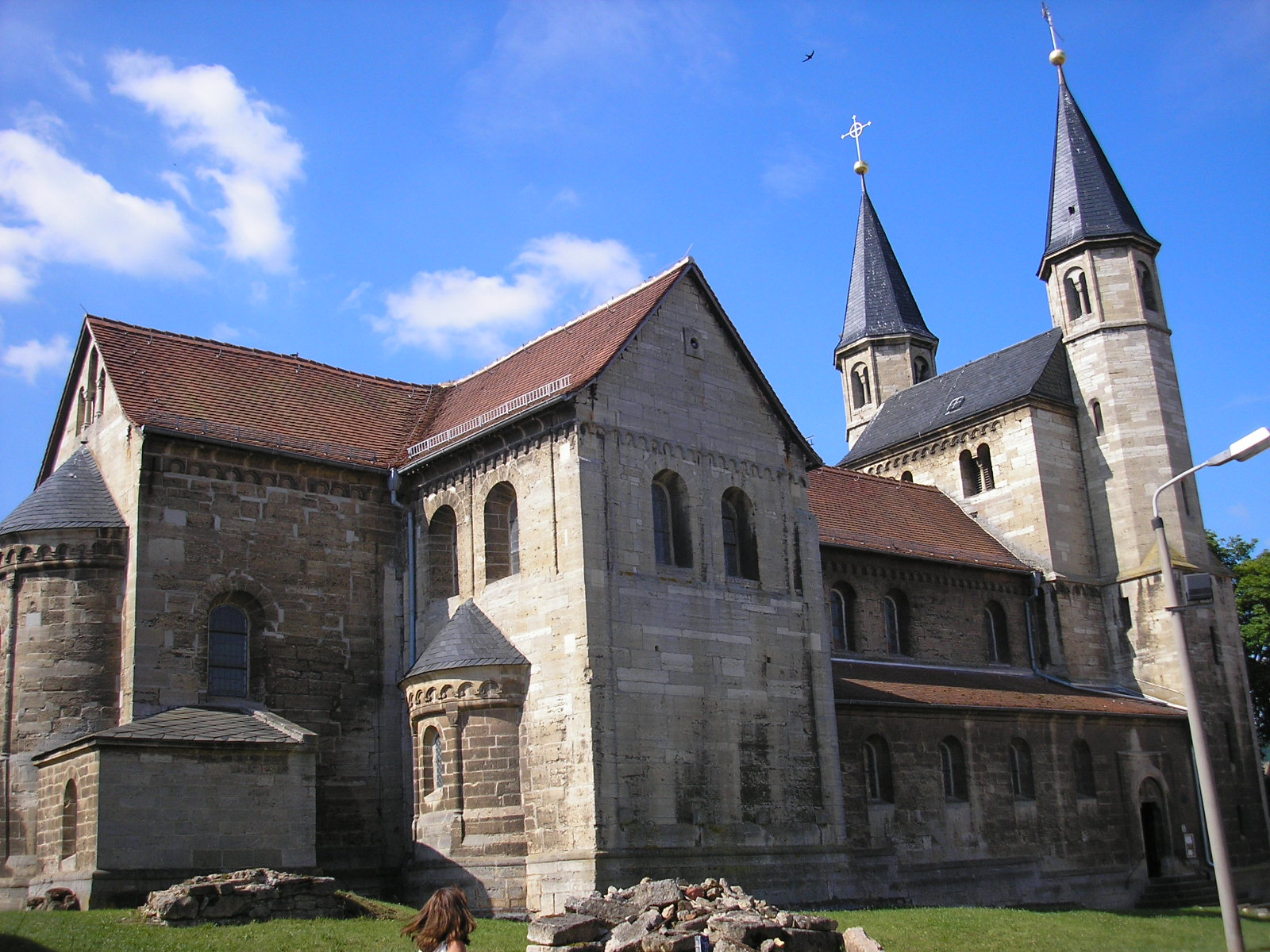
The basilica of Saint Gangulphus in Münchenlohra, northeastern view

The names of Großwenden and Kleinwenden point to originally Wendish settlements. Münchenlohra was originally the domain of the convent of St. Gangulphus, centered on the Romanesque basilica constructed in the 12th century. The convent harboured Benedictine and Augustine nuns until it was dissolved and secularized in the aftermath of the Protestant Reformation in 1546. Initial restoration of the basilica was undertaken by the Prussian state in the 19th century and is further maintained until the present day.

Friedrichslohra was a settlement initiated under the reign of Frederick II of Prussia. In the 18th and 19th century, several projects for the forced sedentarization of local Sinti were undertaken, including a short-lived forced labour and education house.
