= Hainrode, Thuringia =

Hainrode
- Ortsteil of Bleicherode
- Coat of arms
- Interactive map of Hainrode
- Location within Germany Location within Thuringia
- Coordinates: 51°25′N 10°41′E
- Country: Germany
- State: Thuringia
- District: Nordhausen
- Town: Bleicherode

Area
  - Total: 8.79 km^{2} (3.39 sq mi)
- Elevation: 270 m (890 ft)

Population (2017-12-31)
  - Total: 352
  - Density: 40.0/km^{2} (104/sq mi)
- Time zone: UTC+01:00 (CET)
  - Summer (DST): UTC+02:00 (CEST)
- Postal codes: 99735
- Dialling codes: 036334

Hainrode (German pronunciation: [haɪnˈʁoːdə]) is a village and a former municipality in the district of Nordhausen, in Thuringia, Germany. Since 1 January 2019, it is part of the town Bleicherode.
