= Hohenstein, Thuringia =

Hohenstein
- Municipality
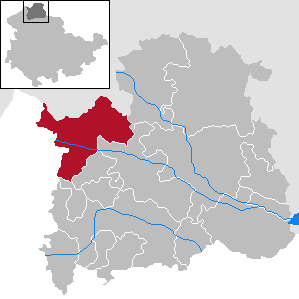
- Location of Hohenstein within Nordhausen district
- Interactive map of Hohenstein
- Location within Germany Location within Thuringia
- Coordinates: 51°29′N 10°34′E
- Country: Germany
- State: Thuringia
- District: Nordhausen

Government
  - Mayor (2021–27): Jens Sauer

Area
  - Total: 61.09 km^{2} (23.59 sq mi)
- Elevation: 235 m (771 ft)

Population (2025-12-31)
  - Total: 2,012
  - Density: 32.94/km^{2} (85.30/sq mi)
- Time zone: UTC+01:00 (CET)
  - Summer (DST): UTC+02:00 (CEST)
- Postal codes: 99735, 99755
- Dialling codes: 036336
- Vehicle registration: NDH

Hohenstein (German pronunciation: [ˈhoːənˌʃtaɪn]) is a municipality in the district of Nordhausen, in Thuringia, Germany.
