= Bleicherode =

- Town
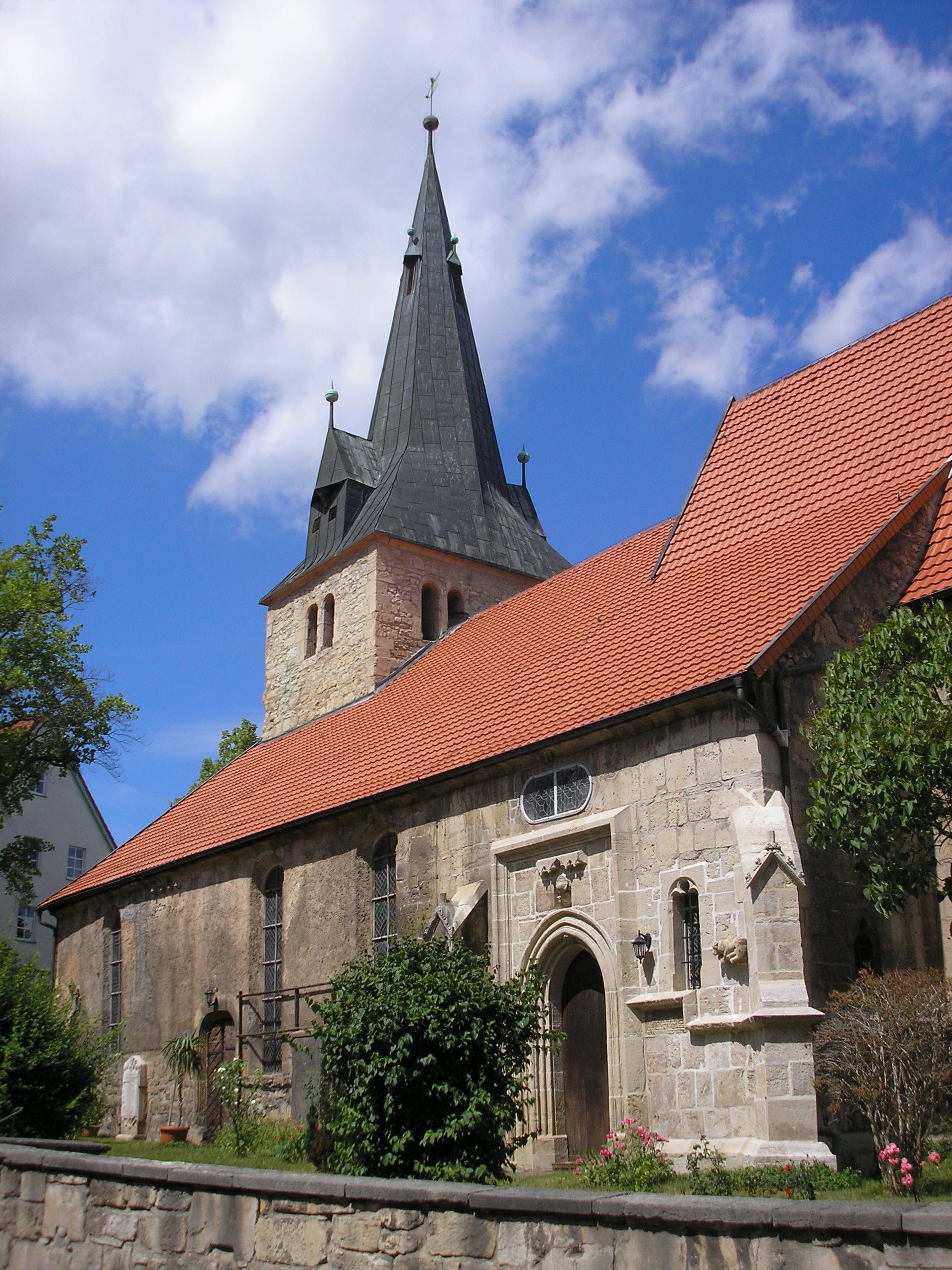
- Gothic Protestant Church of Saint Mary

- Coat of arms

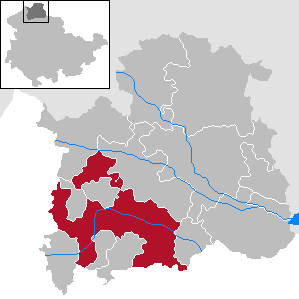
- Location of Bleicherode within Nordhausen district
- Interactive map of Bleicherode
- Location within Germany Location within Thuringia
- Coordinates: 51°25′N 10°34′E
- Country: Germany
- State: Thuringia
- District: Nordhausen

Government
  - Mayor (2019–25): Frank Rostek (CDU)

Area
  - Total: 108.20 km^{2} (41.78 sq mi)
- Elevation: 237 m (778 ft)

Population (2025-12-31)
  - Total: 9,920
  - Density: 91.7/km^{2} (237/sq mi)
- Time zone: UTC+01:00 (CET)
  - Summer (DST): UTC+02:00 (CEST)
- Postal codes: 99752
- Dialling codes: 036338
- Vehicle registration: NDH
- Website: www.bleicherode.de

Bleicherode (German pronunciation: [blaɪçəˈʁoːdə]) is a town in the district of Nordhausen, in Thuringia, Germany. It is situated on the river Wipper, 17 km southwest of Nordhausen. It is located in the southern Harz Mountain area. On 1 December 2007, the former municipality Obergebra was incorporated by Bleicherode. The former municipalities Etzelsrode, Friedrichsthal, Kleinbodungen, Kraja, Hainrode, Nohra, Wipperdorf and Wolkramshausen were merged into Bleicherode in January 2019. Every Tuesday and Thursday, there is a market held at the Zierbrunnenplatz in the town.

Historically, Bleicherode belonged to the Prussian province of Saxony between 1700 and 1945.

One of Bleicherode's most famous natives is the cartographer August Heinrich Petermann.

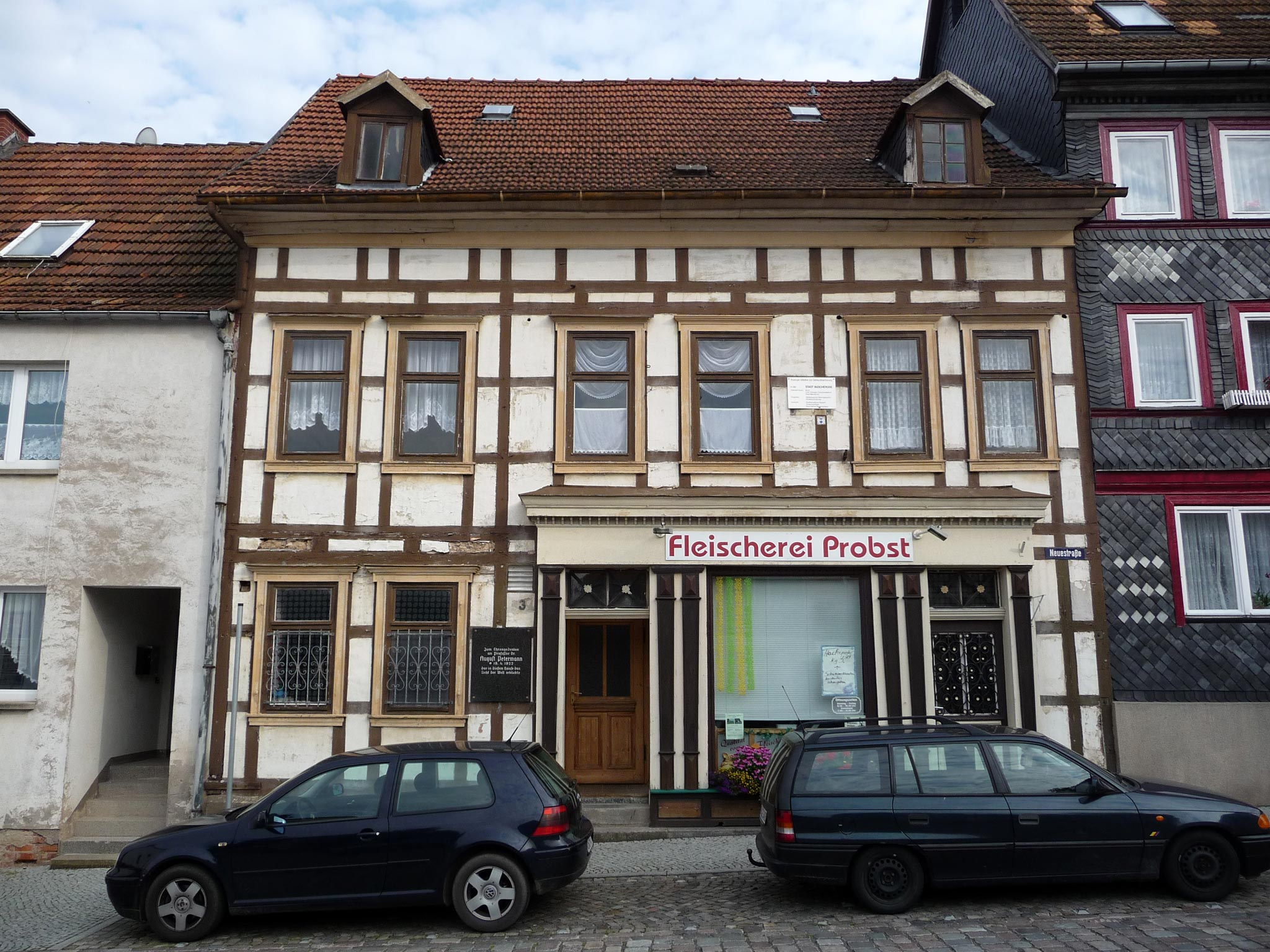
The house where Petermann was born: Neue Straße 3, Bleicherode

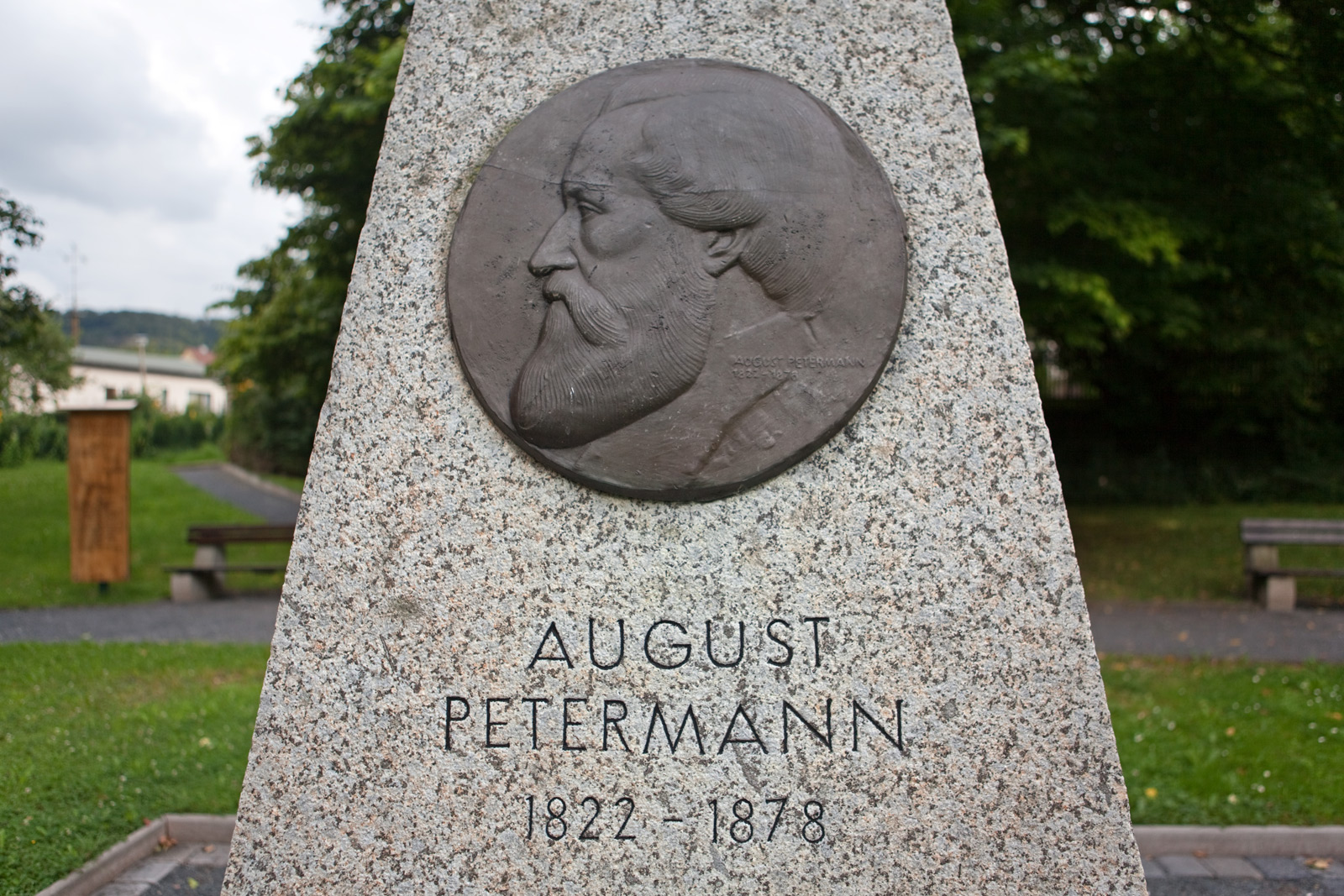
Memorial for August Petermann in Bleicherode

== Notable persons ==
- Gerson von Bleichröder (1822–1893), German-Jewish banker and confidant of Otto von Bismarck
- August Heinrich Petermann (1822–1878), German cartographer
- Adalbert Merx (1838–1909), German theologian
- Hans Beyth (1901–1947), German-Jewish banker and Zionist (leader of Youth Aliyah, 1945–47)

== See also ==
- Gerson von Bleichröder (1822–1893), German-Jewish banker, Chief banker of Otto von Bismarck
