= Niedergebra =

- Municipality
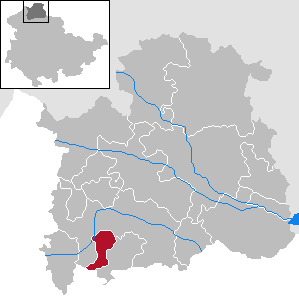
- Location of Niedergebra within Nordhausen district
- Interactive map of Niedergebra
- Location within Germany Location within Thuringia
- Coordinates: 51°25′N 10°36′E
- Country: Germany
- State: Thuringia
- District: Nordhausen

Government
  - Mayor (2022–28): Thomas Pfau

Area
  - Total: 9.99 km^{2} (3.86 sq mi)
- Elevation: 240 m (790 ft)

Population (2025-12-31)
  - Total: 595
  - Density: 59.6/km^{2} (154/sq mi)
- Time zone: UTC+01:00 (CET)
  - Summer (DST): UTC+02:00 (CEST)
- Postal codes: 99759
- Dialling codes: 036338
- Vehicle registration: NDH

Niedergebra is a municipality in the district of Nordhausen, in Thuringia, Germany.
