= Herrmannsacker =

- Ortsteil of Harztor
- Interactive map of Herrmannsacker
- Location within Germany Location within Thuringia
- Coordinates: 51°32′N 10°52′E
- Country: Germany
- State: Thuringia
- District: Nordhausen
- Municipality: Harztor

Area
  - Total: 19.14 km^{2} (7.39 sq mi)
- Elevation: 321 m (1,053 ft)

Population (2016-12-31)
  - Total: 344
  - Density: 18.0/km^{2} (46.5/sq mi)
- Time zone: UTC+01:00 (CET)
  - Summer (DST): UTC+02:00 (CEST)
- Postal codes: 99762
- Dialling codes: 03631

Herrmannsacker (German pronunciation: [ˈhɛʁmansˌʔakɐ]) is a village and a former municipality in the district of Nordhausen, in Thuringia, Germany. Since July 2018, it is part of the municipality Harztor.
