= Hans Beyth =

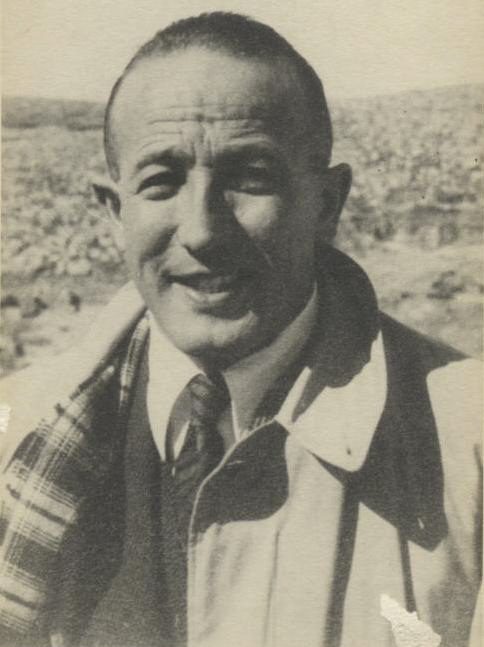
- Hans Beyth
- Born: October 5, 1901; Bleicherode (Prussia, today Thuringia, Germany)
- Died: December 26, 1947 (aged 46); Castel, Mandatory Palestine
- Cause of death: Gunshot wounds
- Occupations: leader of Youth Aliyah, 1945-47

Hans Shmuel Beyth (October 5, 1901 – December 26, 1947) was a German banker and Zionist activist. Between 1935 and 1945 he was a close aide of Henrietta Szold managing the Youth Aliyah, and from 1945 until his death in 1947 he was the leader of the organization in Palestine. Beyth was killed in a shootout during the civil war in Mandatory Palestine.

== Biography ==
The Beyths were a well established Jewish family in the small town of Bleicherode in Prussia (today Thuringia), where they had helped to build up the local textile industry. Being located in Brandenburg-Prussia at that time, the Jewish community of Bleicherode dated back to the beginning of the 18th century, when the Prussian King encouraged Jewish settlement in town, and Jewish families (amongst them the famous Bleichröder family, Bismarck's bankers) contributed considerably to the economic development of that ancient Thuringian mining town at the crossroads of important trade routes. Typically for well-assimilated families with a strong German identity, during World War I, several sons of the Beyth family volunteered for the German army and at least one was awarded the "Iron Cross".

Together with his brother Carl, and as many German "Bürgertum" kids of his generation, Hans had joined the Wandervogel, a naturalistic German Youth organisation very popular at that time, which promoted ideas like Youth Hostels. However, already before World War One, anti-semitism became quite virulent within "Wandervogel" and Jewish members were being systematically discriminated against and pushed out. As a result, Jewish former members of Wandervogel, amongst them the Beyths, formed "Blau-Weiss", a Jewish Youth organisation, as early as 1912, also very early embracing Zionist ideas. After World War I, when Jewish people were smeared in Germany as being responsible for Germany losing the war and Walther Rathenau, a leading Jewish-born industrialist (CEO of AEG Telefunken, then the World's leading electronics and communication company, and Foreign Minister of the First Republican government of the Reich) was assassinated by right-wing terrorists, Zionism became a very strong force in the Jewish youth organisations in Germany.

== Zionist activism ==
Beyth helped train young people in the Hechaluz camps. He was instrumental in organising a Hechaluz camp in Wolfenbüttel. After 1933, he became a key member of the "Jüdische Jugendhilfe" (founded by Recha Freier in Germany as the core of Youth Aliyah). He moved to the Netherlands, where he organized Hechaluz training in Harlingen, and in 1935 he immigrated to Israel with his family.

In Palestine Beyth first worked as the representative for Germany in the Youth Aliyah, initially he was hired to organize accounting of the organisation as an experienced German banker. Because of his outstanding organisational competency he quickly became the closest aide of Youth Aliyah leader Henrietta Szold. Through his activities Beyth helped rescue thousands of Jewish children and youngsters from Europe. One of the most spectacular successes was the rescue of the so-called "Teheran children".

After the death of Szold in February 1945, Beyth took over the official leadership of Youth Aliyah. On December 26, 1947, he accompanied a convoy from Tel Aviv to Jerusalem, which contained a bus with children being brought to Jerusalem in the context of Youth Aliyah activities. Beyth who initially intended to follow the convoy in a passenger car together with Golda Myerson (later Meir) from the Jewish Agency, instead took a place with the children in the bus, to allow a representative of Youth Aliyah from the US to travel in the car. The convoy was fired upon close to the Arab exclaves of Latrun and later at Castel. Beyth returned the fire on the bus with his handgun and was killed in the subsequent gunfight.

== Awards and recognition ==
In 1954 Albert Einstein suggested awarding the Nobel Peace Prize to Youth Aliyah and its founder Recha Freier.

In Jerusalem a major through road is named after Hans Beyth. It connects Sderot Herzl (close to Mount Herzl / Yad Vashem) and Sderot Menachem Begin. 31°46′17″N 35°11′20″E

== Film ==
- AUFBRUCH DER JUGEND! (Deutschland, Palästina, 1936) - Ein Film aus dem Leben der jüdischen Jugend aus Deutschland in Palästina: im Auftrage der Arbeitsgemeinschaft für Kinder - und Jugend - Alijah Berlin, hergestellt von Lou Landauer (Jerusalem). Bearbeitet von Eva Stern und Marta Goldberg (Original-Vorspann, Abschrift lt. Kopie: Steven Spielberg Jewish Film Archive, Jerusalem) (Hans Beyth ist in dem Film zu sehen.) Fritz Bauer Institut Frankfurt - Cinematographie des Holocaust - FBW002570
  - Rahel Wischnitzer-Bernstein: Der Film der Jugendalija. In: Gemeindeblatt der Jüdischen Gemeinde zu Berlin, Jg. 26, Nr. 22, 31. Mai 1936
  - N.: Unsere Jugend - unsere Zukunft. Ein Abend der Jugend-Alijah. In: Jüdische Rundschau (Berlin), Jg. 41, Nr. 45, 4. Juni 1936
