= Uhřice (Kroměříž District) =

- Municipality
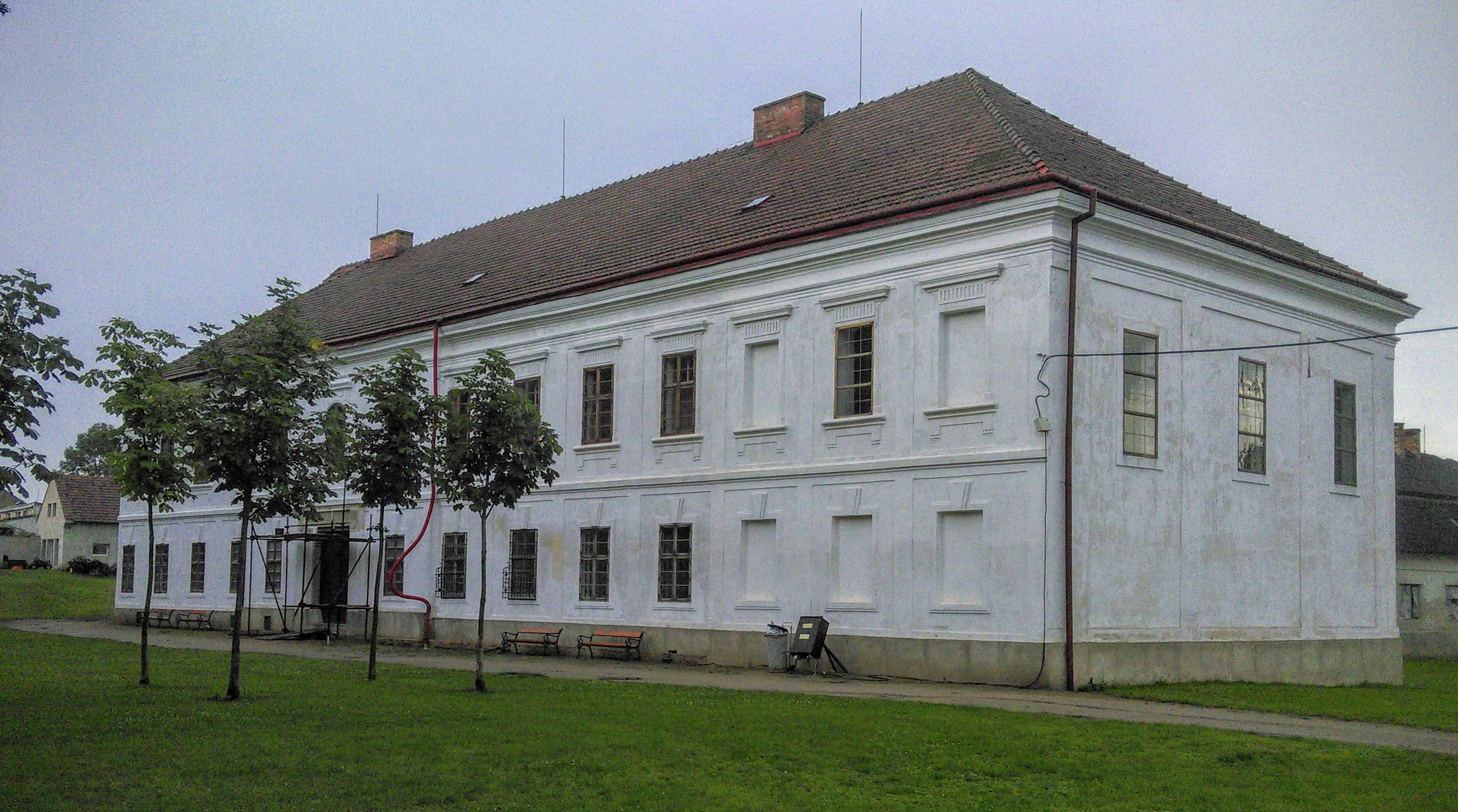
- Uhřice Castle

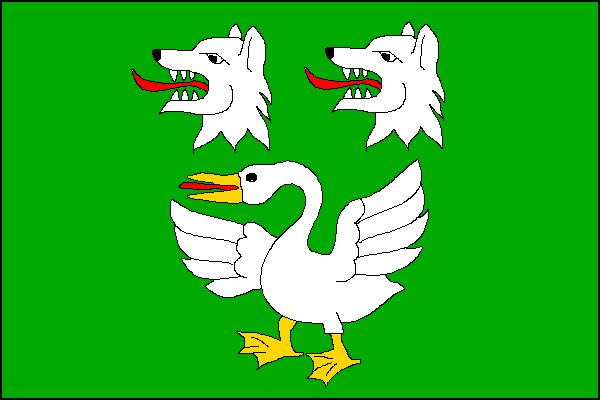
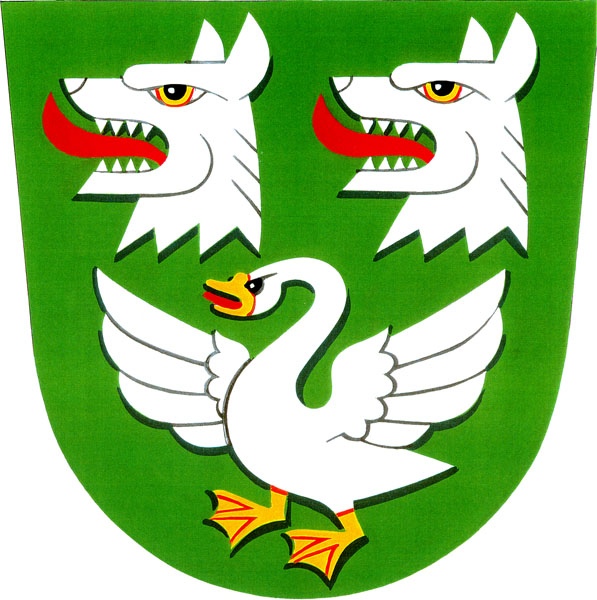
- Flag Coat of arms

- Location in the Czech Republic
- Coordinates: 49°16′54″N 17°12′5″E
- Country: Czech Republic
- Region: Zlín
- District: Kroměříž
- First mentioned: 1336

Area
  - Total: 3.43 km^{2} (1.32 sq mi)
- Elevation: 246 m (807 ft)

Population (2026-01-01)
  - Total: 178
  - Density: 51.9/km^{2} (134/sq mi)
- Time zone: UTC+1 (CET)
  - Summer (DST): UTC+2 (CEST)
- Postal code: 768 33
- Website: obecuhrice.cz

Uhřice is a municipality and village in Kroměříž District in the Zlín Region of the Czech Republic. It has about 200 inhabitants.

Uhřice lies approximately 14 kilometres (9 mi) west of Kroměříž, 34 km (21 mi) west of Zlín, and 220 km (140 mi) south-east of Prague.

== Demographics ==
Historical population
Year	Pop.	±%
1869	309	—
1880	341	+10.4%
1890	320	−6.2%
1900	335	+4.7%
1910	343	+2.4%
1921	393	+14.6%
1930	390	−0.8%
1950	326	−16.4%
1961	308	−5.5%
1970	250	−18.8%
1980	210	−16.0%
1991	189	−10.0%
2001	192	+1.6%
2011	171	−10.9%
2021	169	−1.2%
Source: Censuses

== Notable people ==
- Emanuel von Friedrichsthal (1809–1842), Austrian traveller and botanist
