= Ilfeld =

- Ortsteil of Harztor

- Coat of arms
- Interactive map of Ilfeld
- Location within Germany Location within Thuringia
- Coordinates: 51°34′38″N 10°47′14″E
- Country: Germany
- State: Thuringia
- District: Nordhausen
- Municipality: Harztor

Area
  - Total: 62.33 km^{2} (24.07 sq mi)
- Elevation: 240 m (790 ft)

Population (2010-12-31)
  - Total: 2,954
  - Density: 47.39/km^{2} (122.7/sq mi)
- Time zone: UTC+01:00 (CET)
  - Summer (DST): UTC+02:00 (CEST)
- Postal codes: 99768
- Dialling codes: 036331
- Vehicle registration: NDH
- Website: www.ilfeld.de

Ilfeld is a village and a former municipality in the district of Nordhausen, in Thuringia, in central Germany. It is situated at the south foot of the Harz, at the entrance to the Bährethal, 8 miles (13 km) north from Nordhausen by the railway to Wernigerode. Since 1 January 2012, it has been part of the municipality of Harztor.

== History ==
Ilfeld and Neustadt in the Harz were at the core of a County, first named Bilstein, then Ilfeld and, from 1160 on, the County of Hohnstein by marriage. By the end of the 13th century, the counts had split their territories among several lines due to divisions among the respective male heirs.

In 1154, the place was first mentioned as Ilevelt in a document by the Saxon Duke Henry the Lion. Under impressions of his pilgrimage to the Holy Land and Jerusalem in 1172, Count Elger II of Ilfeld (-Hohnstein) and his wife Lutrude founded in 1189 the Premonstratensian monastery in Ilfeld, as confirmed by the German King Henry VI in 1190.

Ilfeld, as a town, dates from the 14th century, when it sprang up around the monastery. This was reformed in 1545, and a year later converted into the school mentioned above, which under the rectorship of Michael Neander enjoyed a reputation for scholarship, which it maintained for centuries.

When in 1593, the last Count Ernest VII of Hohnstein – ruling together the three fiefs of Klettenberg, Lohra as well as Scharzfeld and Lauterberg – died, the latter fief was reverted to the Guelphic Philip II, Duke of Brunswick and Lunenburg-Grubenhagen, who decided not to enfeoff a new dynasty with the County but to hold it in his own house. The former two territories had as heirs the comital families of Schwarzburg and Stolberg by legation, but were fiefs of the Prince-Bishopric of Halberstadt, whose Prince-Bishop Henry Julius, from the Guelphic ducal family of Brunswick and Lunenburg-Wolfenbüttel withheld them with violence from the intestated heirs.

In 1632, after many litigations at the Reichskammergericht finally the Counties of Lohra and Klettenberg were partially handed over to the heirs. Part of the county owned by the Stolbergs, including Ilfeld, became part of the Electorate of Brunswick and Lunenburg (colloquially called Electorate of Hanover after its capital) in 1803. Then it underwent several conquests first by France, then Prussia, then France again, whose ruler Napoléon Bonaparte allowed his brother Jérôme Bonaparte to annex it for his Kingdom of Westphalia in 1807.

Ilfeld was restituted to Hanover in 1813. By an administrative reform, Ilfeld became the capital of the meanwhile Royal Hanoveran Province of Hohnstein in 1815, later renamed into Department of Hohnstein (German: Amt Hohnstein). When in 1866 Prussia annexed Hanover Ilfeld stayed with the now Prussian Province of Hanover, becoming in 1885 the capital of the District of Ilfeld (German: Kreis Ilfeld), combining the territorially unconnected former Hanoveran departments of Ilfeld and Elbingerode. By the Prussian reform of districts in 1932 the District of Ilfeld was dissolved and its two territorially unconnected parts were disentangled from Hanover and transferred to the Prussian Province of Saxony, with the Hohnstein section including Ilfeld becoming a part of the District of the County of Hohenstein [sic], which comprised those parts of the ancient Hohnstein County, which had remained with the Prince-Bishopric of Halberstadt in 1632.

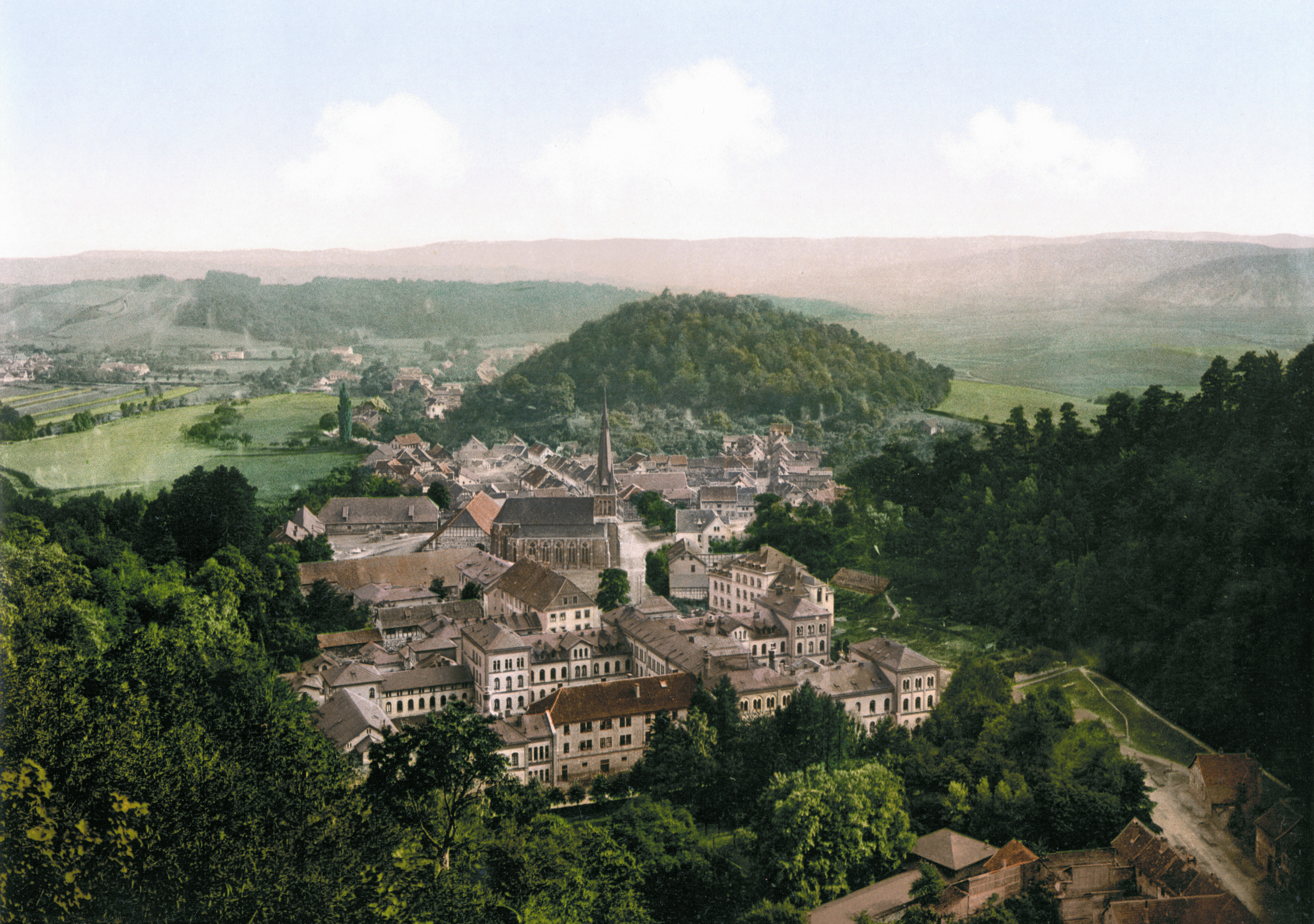
Ilfeld in c. 1900

By the early 20th century, Ilfeld contained a Lutheran church, a celebrated gymnasium, once a monasterial school, with a fine library. Until 1903, the Evangelical Lutheran State Church of Hanover ran a consistory in Ilfeld competent for the former County of Hohnstein. Furthermore, there were manufactures of parquet-flooring, paper, and plaster of Paris, while another industry in the town was brewing. It was also of some repute as a health resort.

During World War II, Ilfeld was the location of a subcamp of the Mittelbau-Dora concentration camp, whose prisoners were Jews, Poles, French and Soviets. Many prisoners were massacred after the dissolution of the camp, either during the subsequent death march or in the Gardelegen massacre.

In July 1945, Ilfeld became part of the Soviet occupation zone. Big parts of the Province of Saxony, including Ilfeld, were integrated into the enlarged state of Thuringia in 1946.

== Natural monuments ==
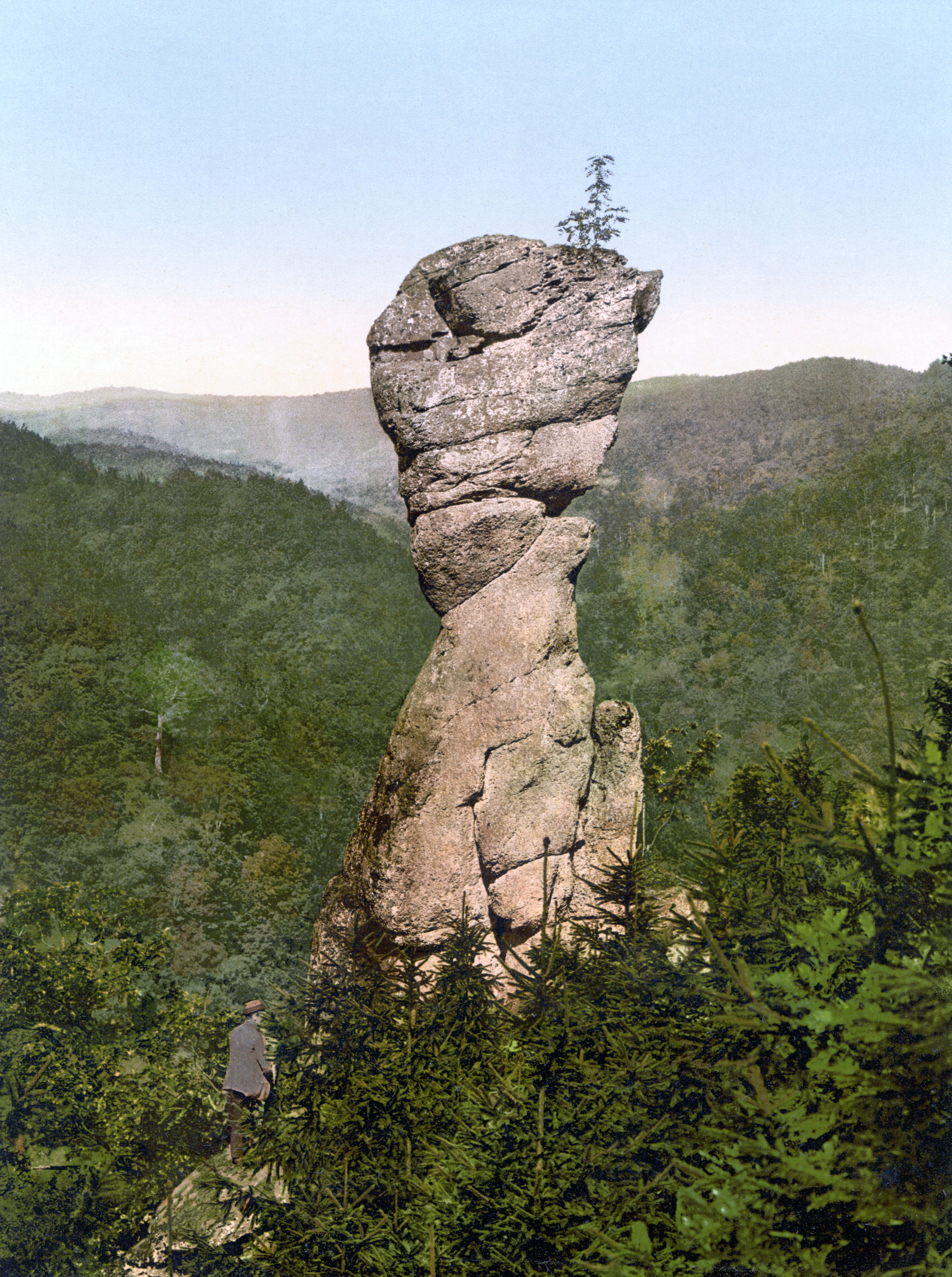
The Gänseschnabel (a porphyritic rock), c. 1900

The Lange Wand is at the southern approach to the village on the steep bank of the Behre. The geological outcrop which is explained on an information board sheds light on the history of the formation of the Harz Mountains and the Harz Foreland. Well-known natural monuments and walking destinations in the immediate vicinity of Ilfeld are the Gänseschnabel, the Nadelöhr and the Mönch.

== Sources ==
- Forstemann, Monumenta rerum Ilfeldensium (Nordhausen, 1843)
- Michael Neander, Bericht vom Kloster Ilfeld, edited by Bouterwek (Göttingen, 1873)
- K. Meyer, Geschichte des Klosters Ilfeld (Leipzig, 1897).
