= Gänseschnabel =

Natural monument in Germany

Coordinates: 51°35′7.98″N 10°47′32.69″E

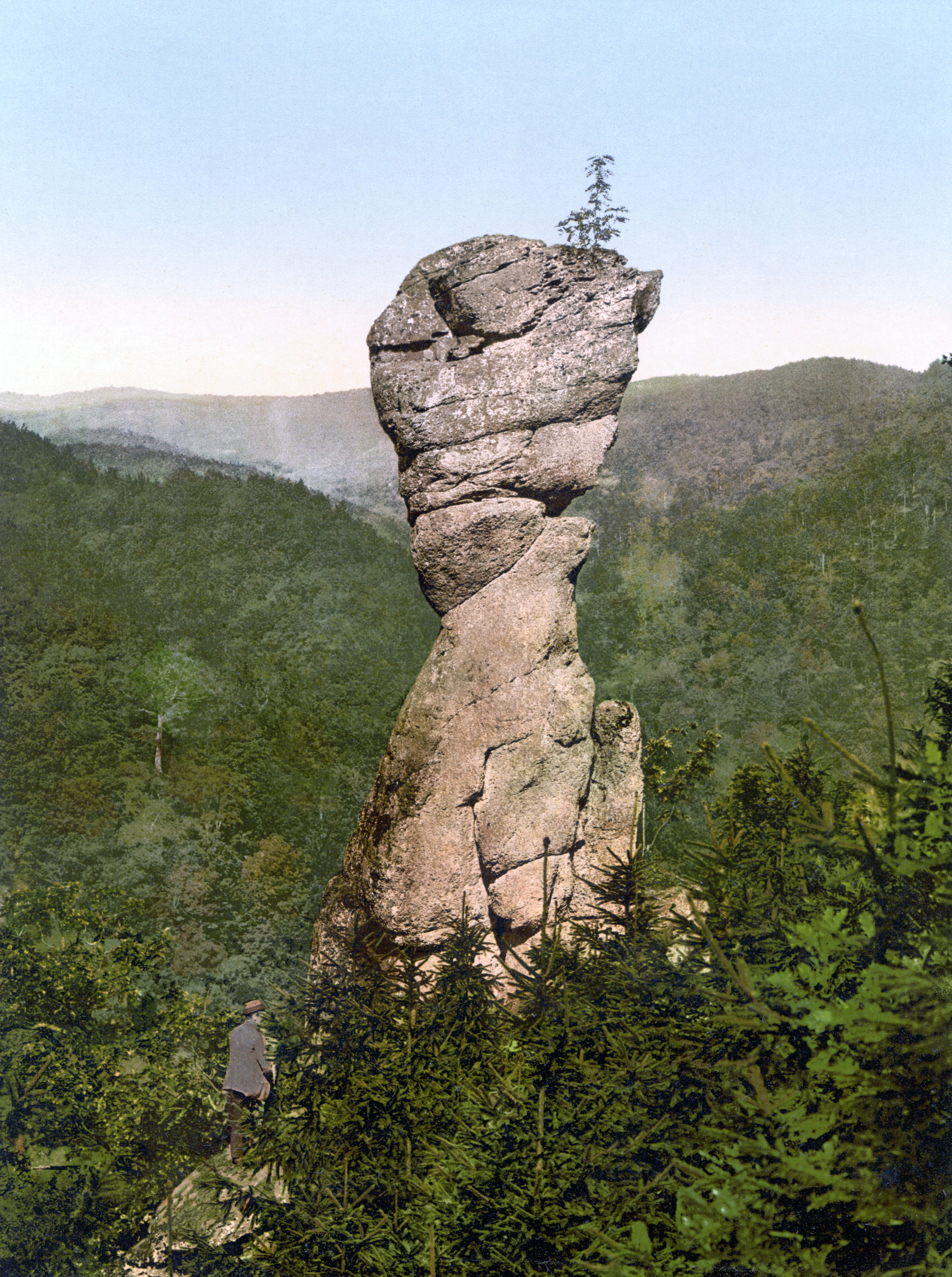
The Gänseschnabel (a porphyritic rock), ca. 1900

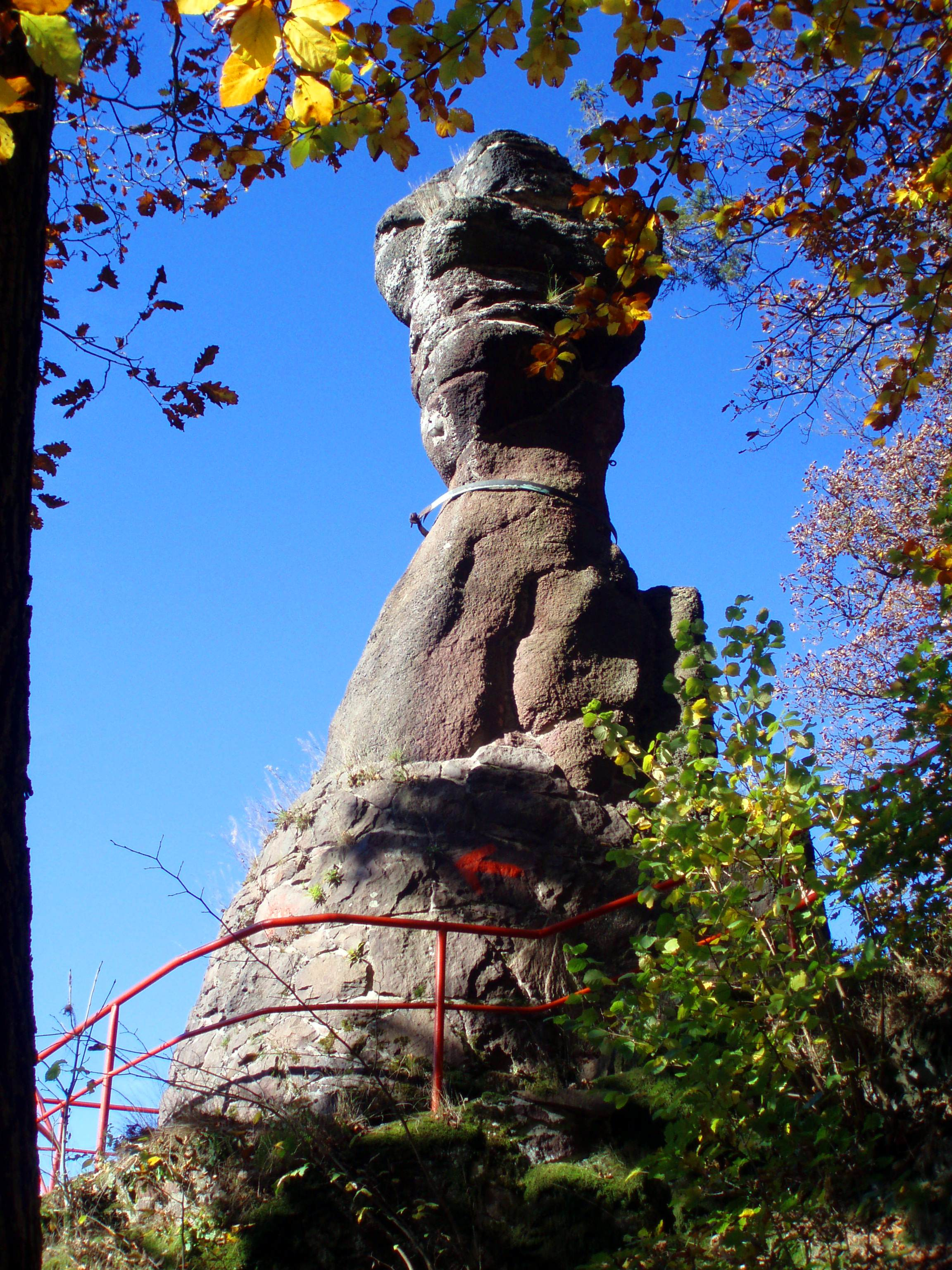
The Gänseschnabel

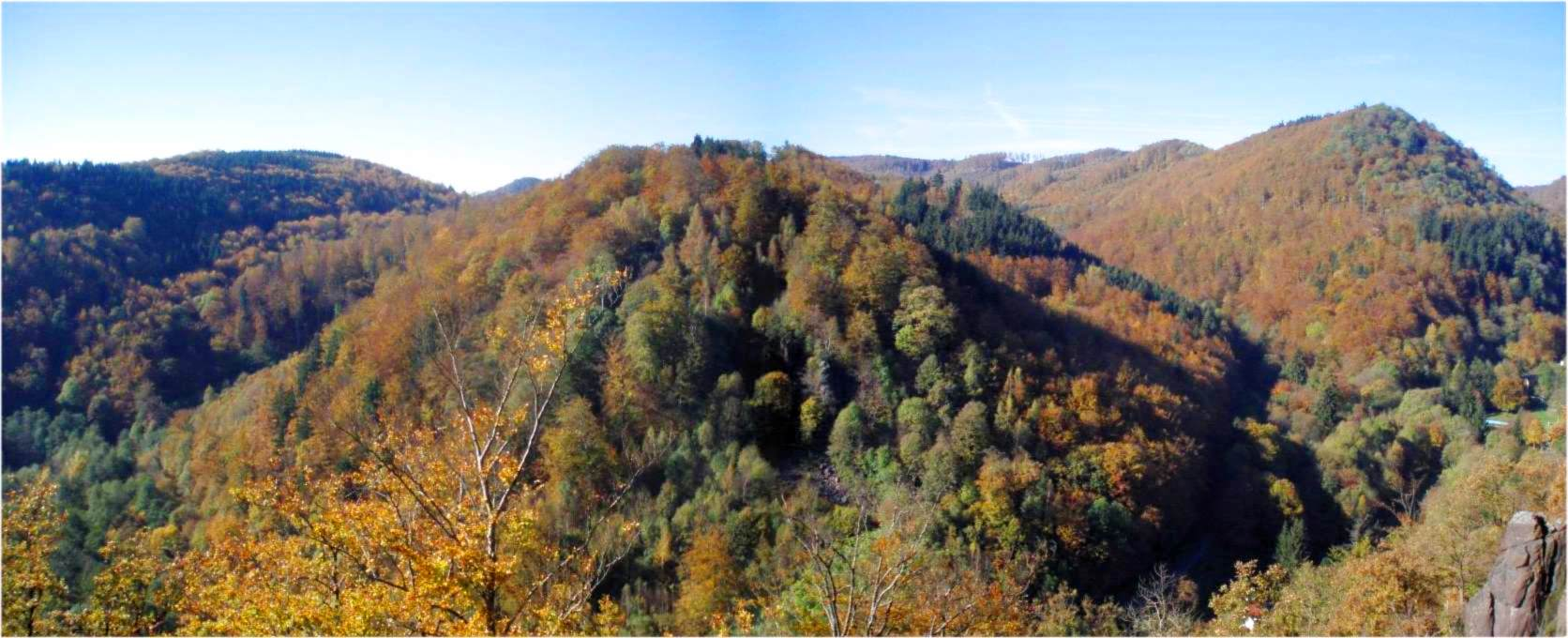
View of the Behre valley

The Gänseschnabel is a natural monument north of Ilfeld in Thuringia, Germany. It is a striking, free-standing rock pillar made of porphyry, which resembles the beak of a goose (or duck) and from which there is a comprehensive view of the Behre valley looking towards Netzkater.

There is a legend connected with the Gänseschnabel about a spellbound goose girl who had fallen in love with a monk from the monastery at Ilfeld. A witch went to transform the monk in a rock when he waved to her from the other side of the valley. As the goose girl burst into tears, the witch turned her to stone as well.

== Sources ==
- Graevert, Horst (1984), Meyenburg Museum (ed.), "Der Gänseschnabel", Beiträge zur Heimatkunde aus Stadt und Kreis Nordhausen (in German), vol. Heft 9, Nordhausen, pp. 22–25
