= Emanuel von Friedrichsthal =

Austrian traveler, daguerreotypist, botanist and archaeologist

Emanuel von Friedrichsthal (January 12, 1809 – March 3, 1842) was an Austrian traveler, daguerreotypist, botanist, and amateur archaeologist, who traveled through the Balkans and in Central America and documented his findings.

== Biography ==
Von Friedrichsthal was born in Uhřice in the Austrian Empire (present-day Czech Republic). He was educated in Vienna at the Theresian Military Academy and entered Austrian government service, but soon left to pursue scientific travels. He traveled through Rumelia in the 1830s, publishing his findings in two books: Reise in die südlichen Theile von Griechenland (Journey to the Southern Parts of Greece, 1838) and Serbiens Neuzeit in geschichtlicher, politischer, topographischer, statistischer und naturhistorischer Hinsicht (Modern Serbia in Historical, Political, Topographical, Statistical, and Natural-Historical Respects, 1840). These publications acquired for him in particular a reputation in botany for their descriptions of the flora of Greece and Serbia.

In 1840, he was posted as first secretary of the Austrian Legation to Mexico, where he became interested exploring the ruins of Maya civilization after reading the writings of John Lloyd Stephens and Frederick Catherwood. He discussed his plans with historian William H. Prescott during a trip to Boston, and bought a daguerreotype apparatus in New York City. He went to the Yucatán in mid-1840, and traveled throughout the Yucatán and Chiapas, becoming the first person to take daguerreotypes of the Mayan ruins, and the first European in the 19th century to visit the ruins of Chichen Itza.

He fell ill during his travels, probably with malaria, which necessitated his return to Europe in 1841, where he died in Vienna in 1842. This early death prevented him from publishing the results of his Central-American travels, but he had put on an exhibition of twenty-five daguerreotypes in New York, in the British Museum in London and in Paris, for which he was honored by the Académie des Inscriptions et Belles-Lettres.
