= Uhřice (Blansko District) =

- Municipality
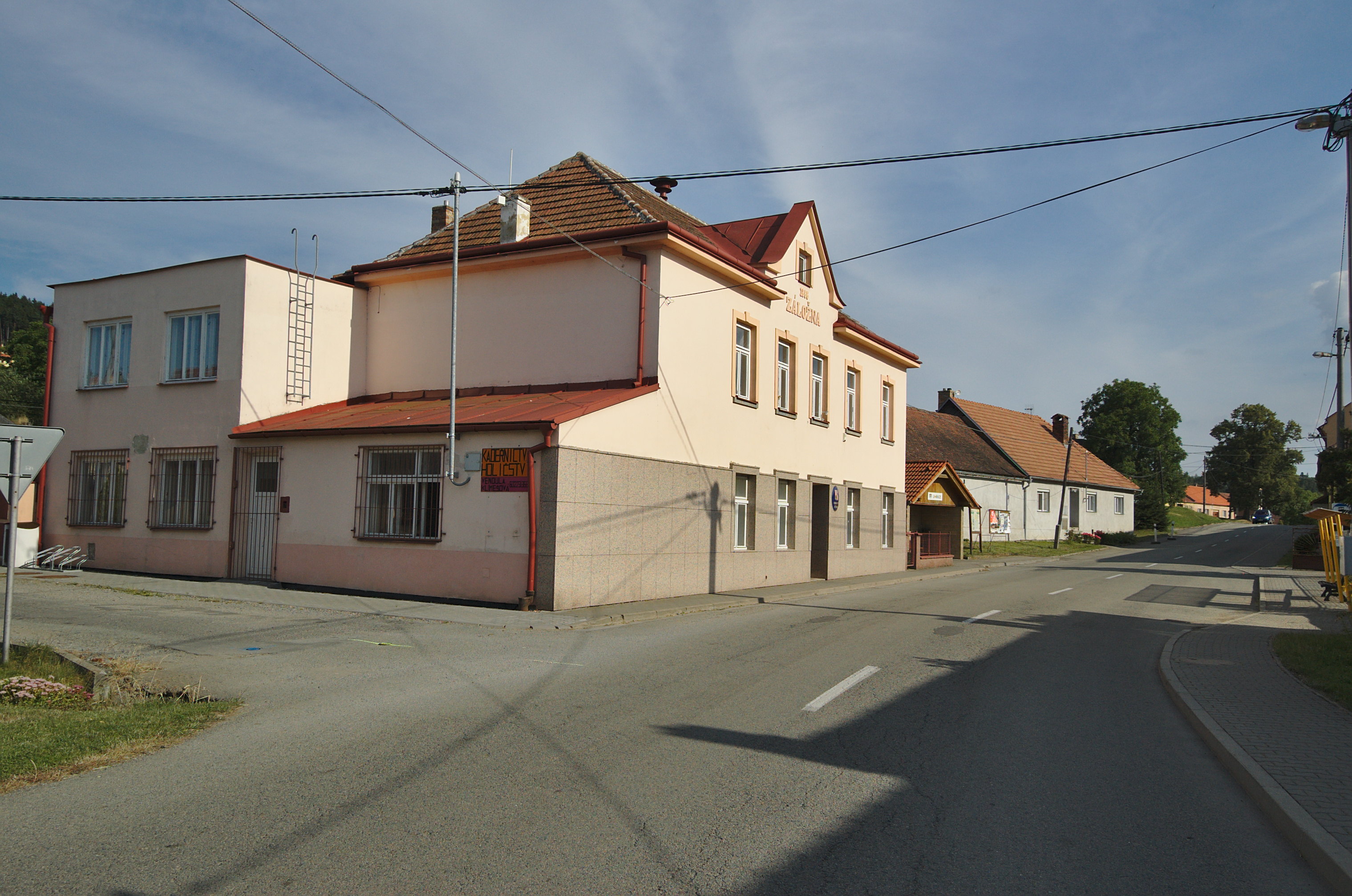
- Civic bank

- Flag Coat of arms

- Location in the Czech Republic
- Coordinates: 49°35′42″N 16°44′6″E
- Country: Czech Republic
- Region: South Moravian
- District: Blansko
- First mentioned: 1078

Area
  - Total: 6.56 km^{2} (2.53 sq mi)
- Elevation: 406 m (1,332 ft)

Population (2026-01-01)
  - Total: 295
  - Density: 45.0/km^{2} (116/sq mi)
- Time zone: UTC+1 (CET)
  - Summer (DST): UTC+2 (CEST)
- Postal code: 679 63
- Website: www.uhrice.eu

Uhřice is a municipality and village in Blansko District in the South Moravian Region of the Czech Republic. It has about 300 inhabitants.

Uhřice lies approximately 27 kilometres (17 mi) north of Blansko, 45 km (28 mi) north of Brno, and 175 km (109 mi) east of Prague.

== Demographics ==
Historical population
Year	Pop.	±%
1869	588	—
1880	589	+0.2%
1890	558	−5.3%
1900	553	−0.9%
1910	551	−0.4%
1921	567	+2.9%
1930	508	−10.4%
1950	431	−15.2%
1961	469	+8.8%
1970	401	−14.5%
1980	377	−6.0%
1991	335	−11.1%
2001	305	−9.0%
2011	296	−3.0%
2021	293	−1.0%
Source: Censuses
