= Neustadt/Harz =

- Ortsteil of Harztor
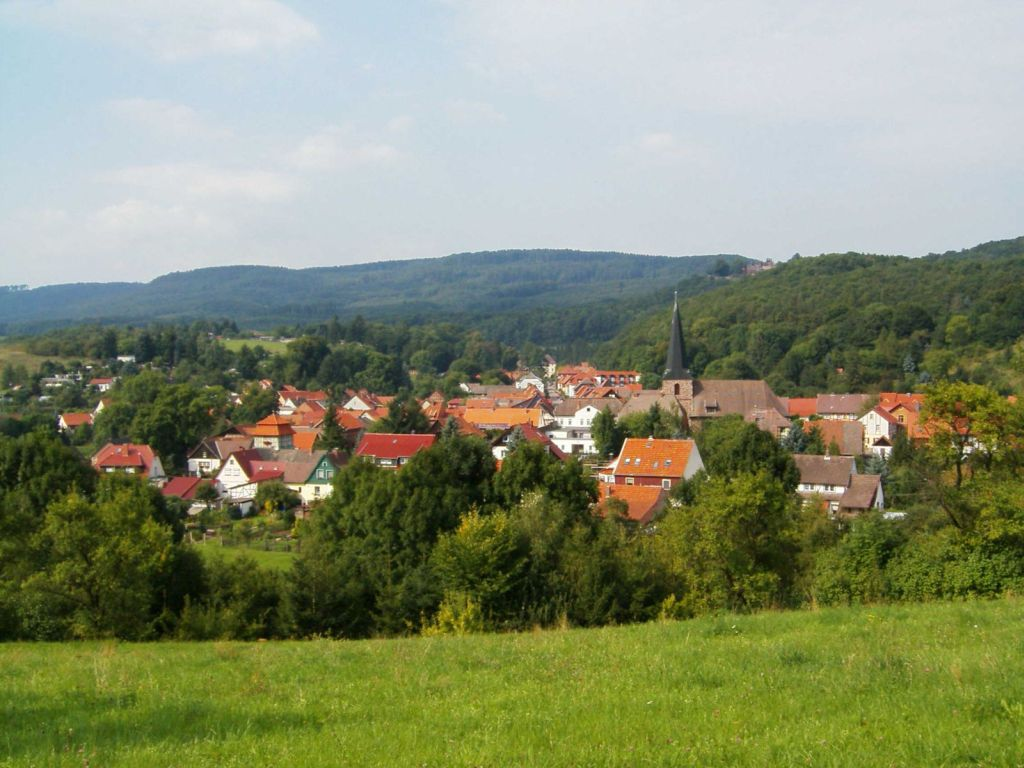

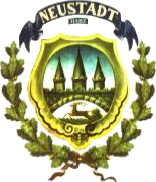
- Coat of arms
- Interactive map of Neustadt/Harz
- Location within Germany Location within Thuringia
- Coordinates: 51°33′36″N 10°50′003″E
- Country: Germany
- State: Thuringia
- District: Nordhausen
- Municipality: Harztor

Area
  - Total: 11.47 km^{2} (4.43 sq mi)
- Elevation: 260 m (850 ft)

Population (2016-12-31)
  - Total: 1,122
  - Density: 97.82/km^{2} (253.4/sq mi)
- Time zone: UTC+01:00 (CET)
  - Summer (DST): UTC+02:00 (CEST)
- Postal codes: 99768
- Dialling codes: 036331
- Vehicle registration: NDH
- Website: www.neustadt-harz.de

Neustadt/Harz (German pronunciation: [ˈnɔʏʃtat]) is a village and a former municipality in the district of Nordhausen, in Thuringia, Germany. Since July 2018, it is part of the municipality Harztor.

== Culture and places of interest ==
The area around Neustadt is rich in places of interest, which are all accessible on footpaths. Of the three castle ruins Hohnstein Castle, the oldest in the entire Harz, is the most significant. Six kilometers from the village is the recently renovated and protected monument of the Neustadt Reservoir (also often called the Nordhausen Reservoir). There is also the Gondelteich lake and a separate forest swimming pool. Nearby is the hill known as the Poppenberg (601 m above sea level (NN)), where the High Harz begins.

== Gallery ==
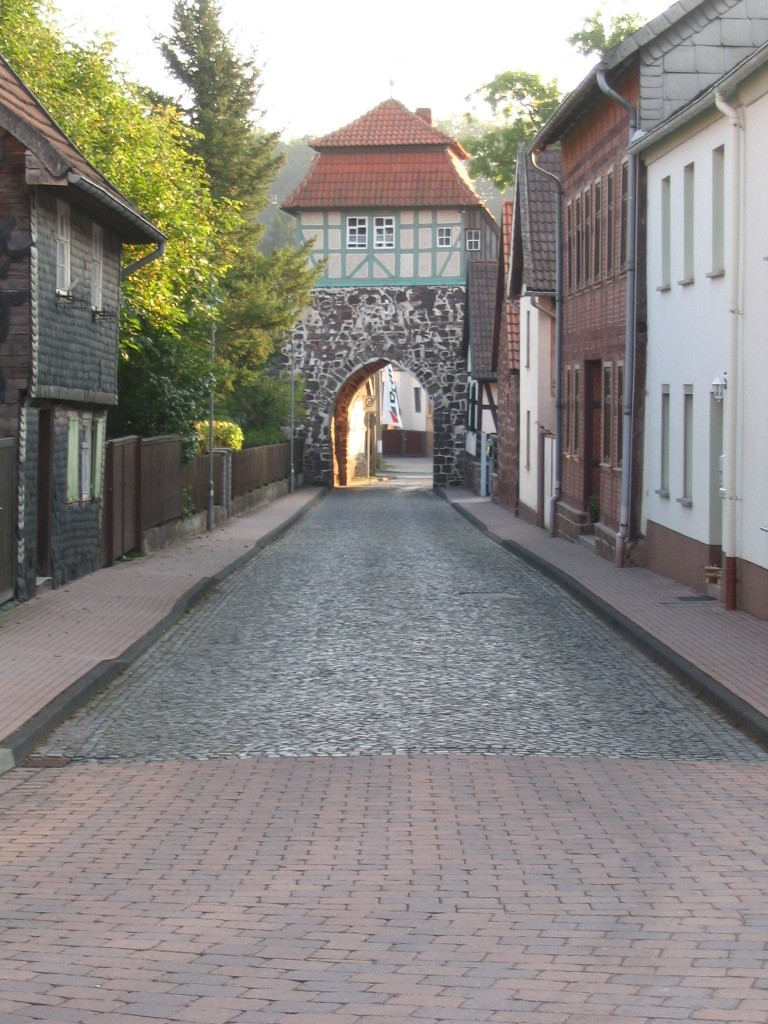
The 'Old Gate'

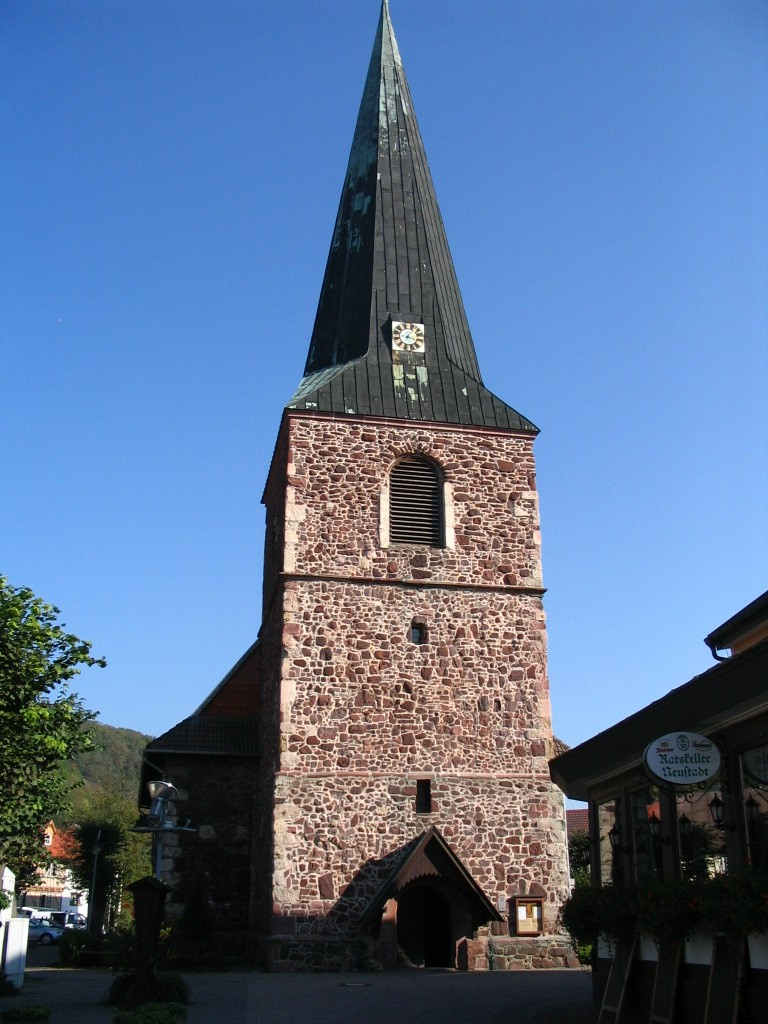
St. George's Church
