= Harztor =

- Municipality
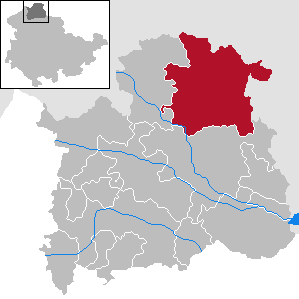
- Location of Harztor within Nordhausen district
- Interactive map of Harztor
- Location within Germany Location within Thuringia
- Coordinates: 51°34′N 10°46′E
- Country: Germany
- State: Thuringia
- District: Nordhausen

Government
  - Mayor (2024–30): Stephan Klante

Area
  - Total: 109.37 km^{2} (42.23 sq mi)
- Elevation: 210 m (690 ft)

Population (2025-12-31)
  - Total: 7,306
  - Density: 66.80/km^{2} (173.0/sq mi)
- Time zone: UTC+01:00 (CET)
  - Summer (DST): UTC+02:00 (CEST)
- Postal codes: 99768, 99762
- Dialling codes: 036331
- Vehicle registration: NDH

Harztor (German pronunciation: [ˈhaːɐ̯tsˌtoːɐ̯], lit. 'Harz Gate') is a municipality in the district of Nordhausen, in Thuringia, Germany. It was formed on 1 January 2012 by the merger of the former municipalities Ilfeld and Niedersachswerfen. In July 2018 the former municipalities of Harzungen, Herrmannsacker and Neustadt/Harz were merged into Harztor.
