= Nordhausen (district) =

Town in Thuringia, Germany

Coordinates: 51°30′N 10°45′E

- District
- Flag Coat of arms
- Country: Germany
- State: Thuringia
- Capital: Nordhausen

Government
  - District admin.: Matthias Jendricke (SPD)

Area
  - Total: 713.92 km^{2} (275.65 sq mi)

Population (31 December 2025)
  - Total: 80,762
  - Density: 113.12/km^{2} (292.99/sq mi)
- Time zone: UTC+01:00 (CET)
  - Summer (DST): UTC+02:00 (CEST)
- Vehicle registration: NDH
- Website: landkreis-nordhausen.de

Nordhausen is a Kreis (district) in the north of Thuringia, Germany. Neighboring districts are (from the north clockwise): Harz and Mansfeld-Südharz in Saxony-Anhalt; Kyffhäuserkreis and Eichsfeld in Thuringia; and Göttingen and Goslar in Lower Saxony.

== History ==
The district was created in 1815, when the Prussian province of Saxony was created. The area of Lohra-Clettenberg (the former dukedom County Hohnstein) and the previously independent imperial city of Nordhausen were then administered together. In 1882-3 Nordhausen left the district, which led to its renaming as the Kreis Grafschaft Hohenstein (district county of Hohenstein) in 1888. After World War II the name reverted to Landkreis Nordhausen, and in 1950 the city of Nordhausen was reincorporated into the district. In the administrative reform of 1952 several municipalities changed districts: a number were transferred from the district of Sangerhausen to that of Nordhausen, while others were transferred from Nordhausen to the districts of Worbis, Wernigerode, Sondershausen, and Sangerhausen.

== Geography ==
The district is located in the southern foothills of the Harz mountains. The highest point is the Große Ehrenberg, with an elevation of 635.3m above sea level. The main river in the district is the Zorge. To the south lie the Dün, Hainleite, and Windleite ranges of hills.

== Coat of arms ==
The checkered red-silver part of the coat of arms is derived from the coat of arms of the County of Hohenstein, the historical territory to which the district belonged. The broken tree trunk symbolizes the destruction of the city of Nordhausen during World War II, while the new branch growing into the golden area stands for the city's reconstruction and its bright new future.

== Towns and municipalities ==
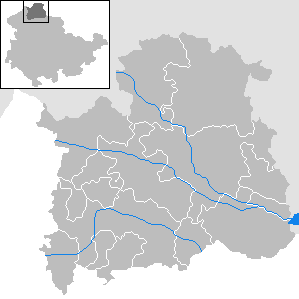
Clickable map of towns and municipalities in the district

Verwaltungsgemeinschaft-free towns
and municipalities
1. Bleicherode
2. Ellrich
3. Heringen
4. Nordhausen
1. Görsbach
2. Großlohra
3. Harztor
4. Hohenstein
5. Kehmstedt
6. Kleinfurra
7. Lipprechterode
8. Niedergebra
9. Sollstedt
10. Urbach
11. Werther
