= Moischt =

- Borough of Marburg
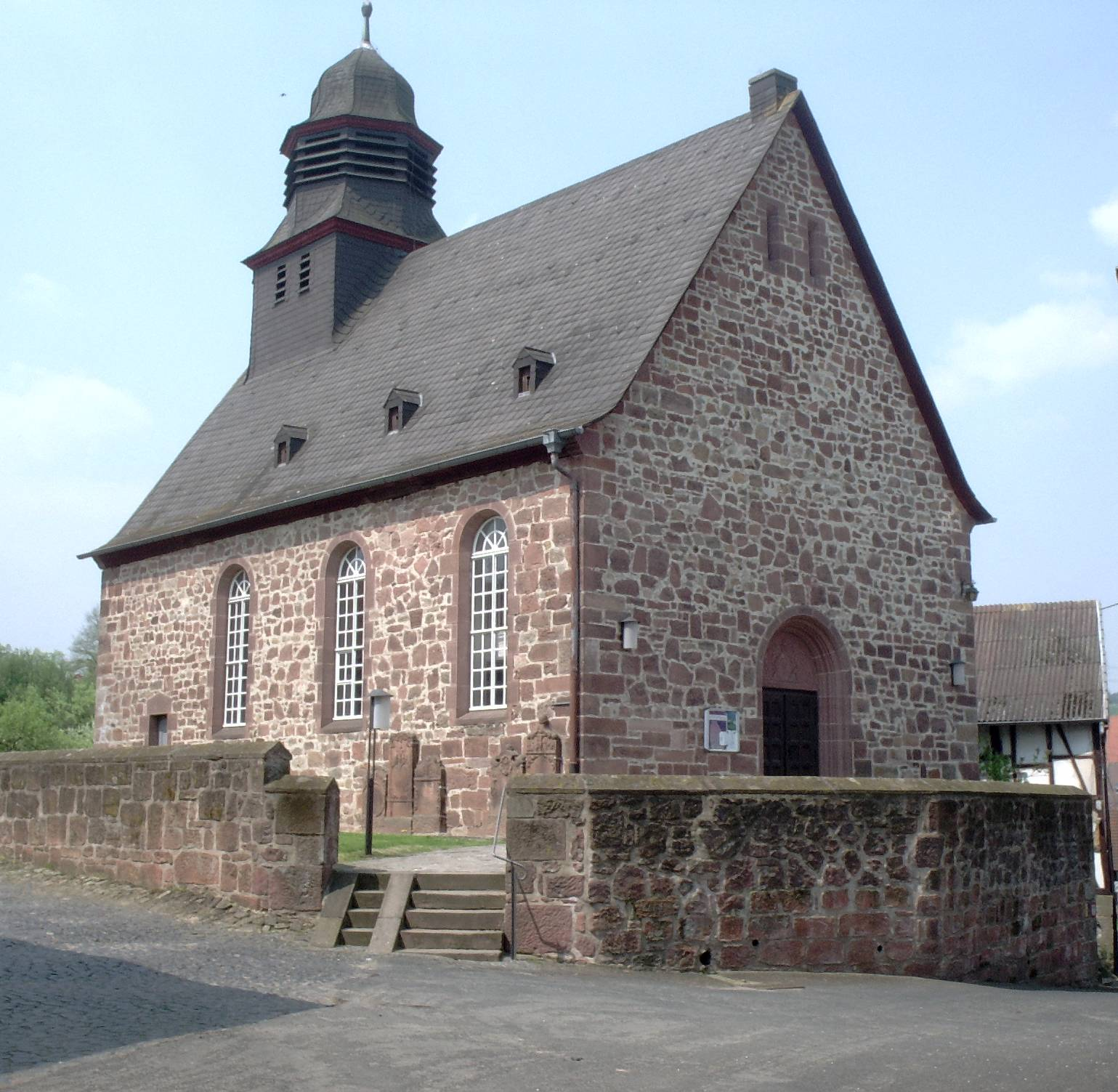
- Moischt church

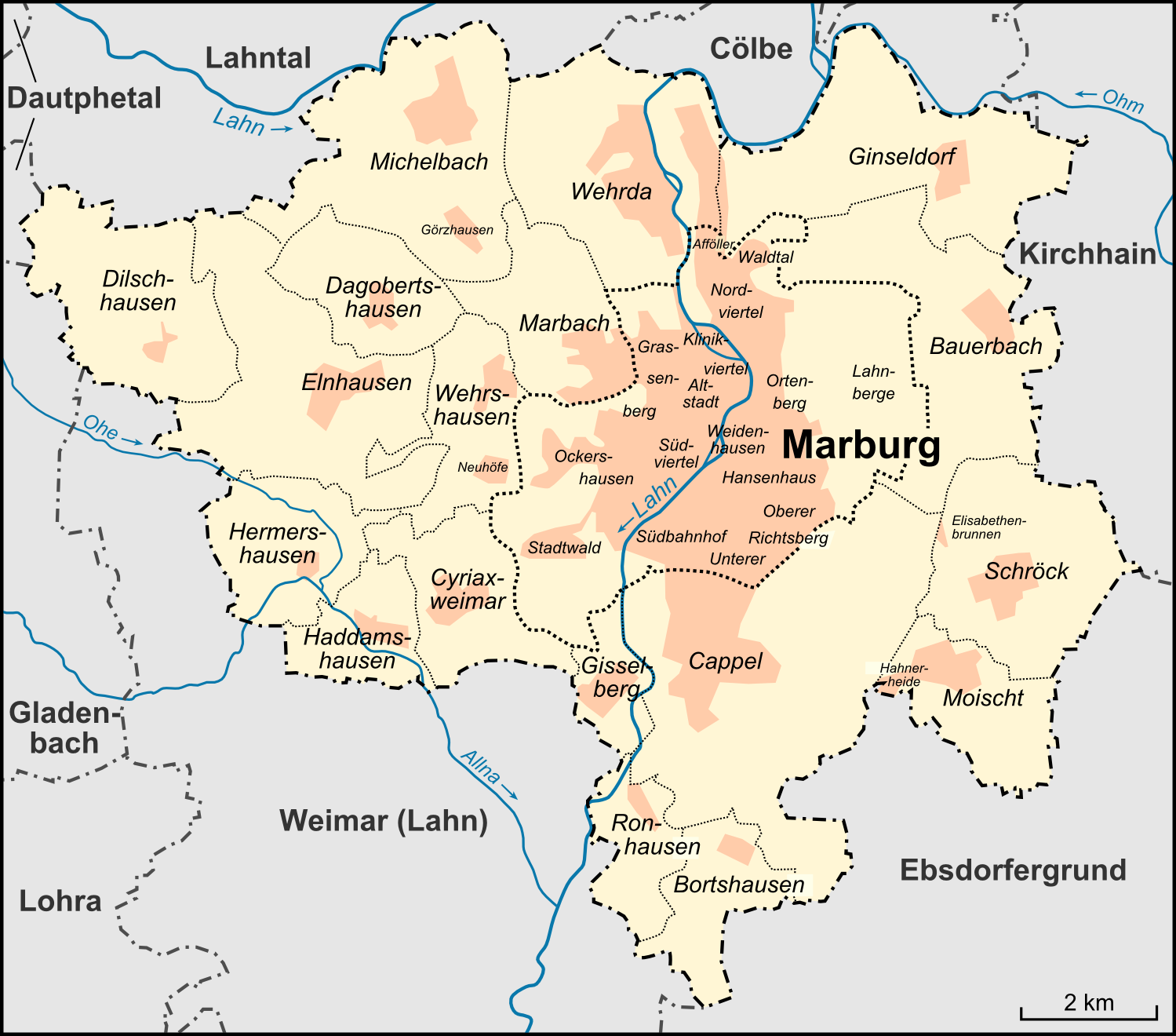
- Stadtteile of Marburg
- Interactive map of Moischt
- Location within Germany Location within Hesse
- Coordinates: 50°46′21″N 8°49′20″E
- Country: Germany
- State: Hesse
- District: Marburg-Biedenkopf
- City: Marburg
- Elevation: 240 m (790 ft)

Population (2019-12-31)
  - Total: 1,131
- Time zone: UTC+01:00 (CET)
  - Summer (DST): UTC+02:00 (CEST)
- Postal codes: 35043
- Dialling codes: 06424

Moischt [German pronunciation: [ˈmœʃt] ] is a borough (Ortsbezirk) of Marburg in Hesse.
