= Schröck =

- Borough of Marburg
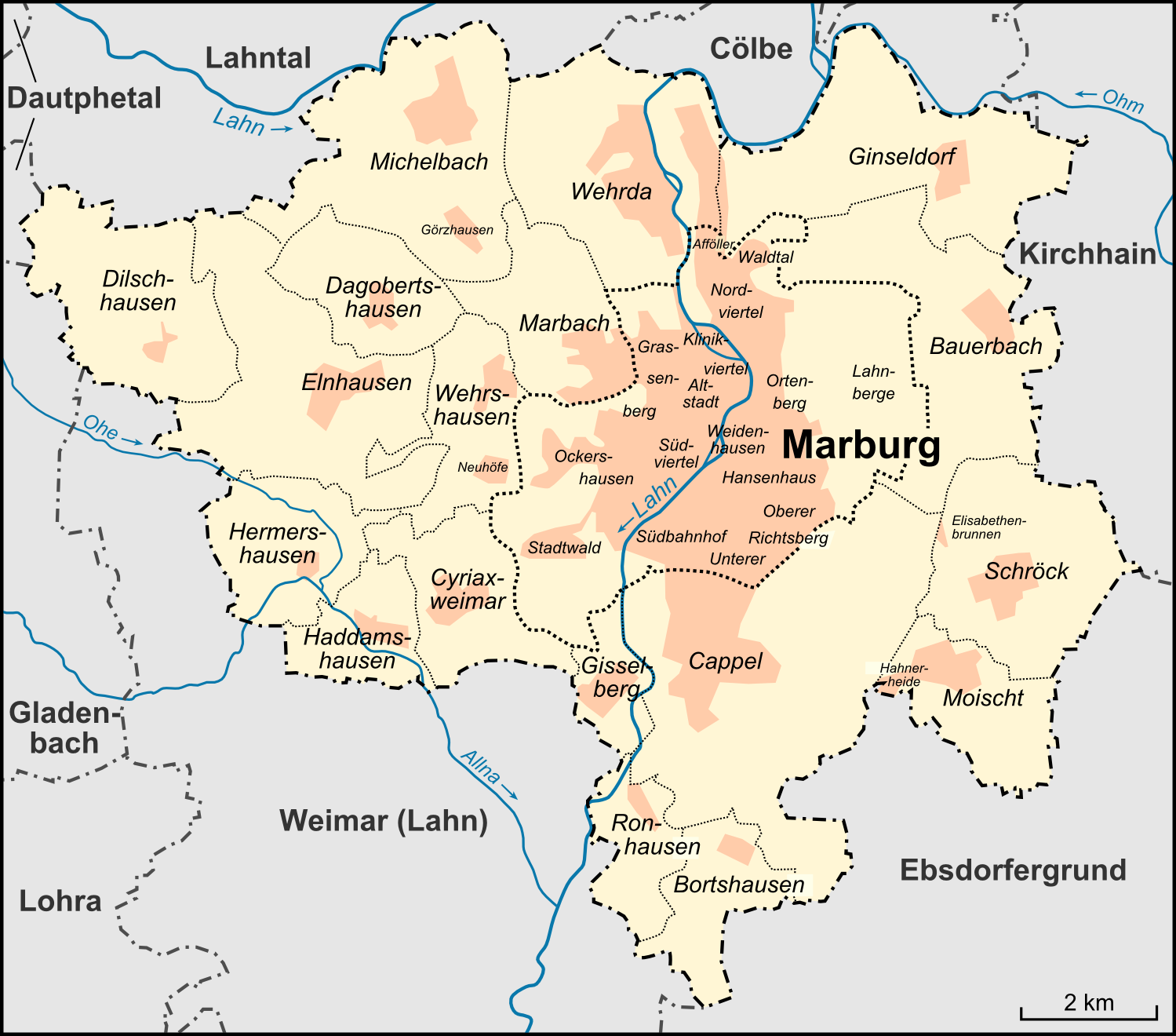
- Stadtteile of Marburg
- Interactive map of Schröck
- Location within Germany Location within Hesse
- Coordinates: 50°47′16″N 8°49′58″E
- Country: Germany
- State: Hesse
- District: Marburg-Biedenkopf
- City: Marburg

Area
  - Total: 6.47 km^{2} (2.50 sq mi)
- Elevation: 218 m (715 ft)

Population (2019-12-31)
  - Total: 1,755
  - Density: 271/km^{2} (703/sq mi)
- Time zone: UTC+01:00 (CET)
  - Summer (DST): UTC+02:00 (CEST)
- Postal codes: 35043
- Dialling codes: 06424
- Website: www.mr-schroeck.de

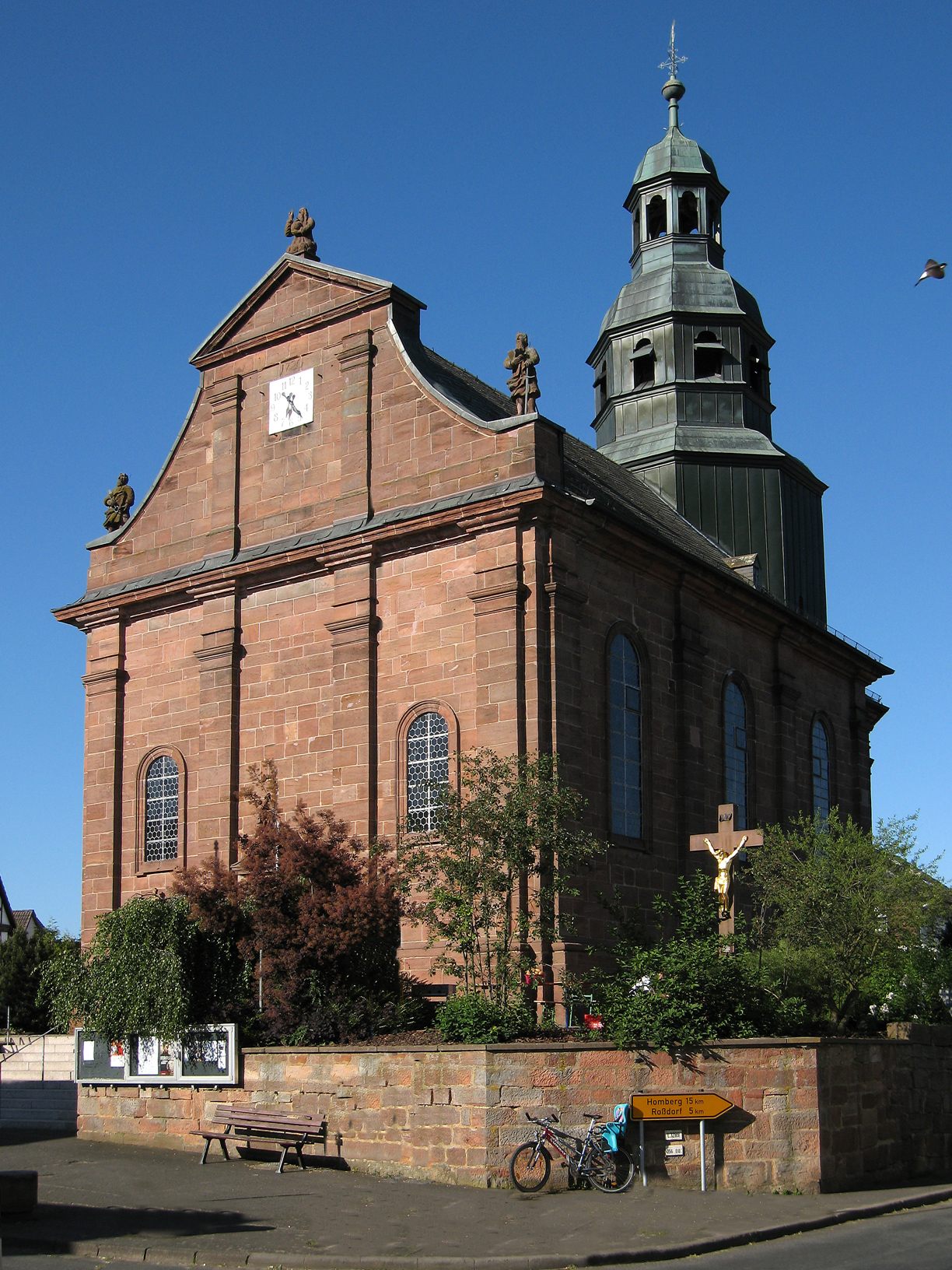
Schröck church

Schröck (German pronunciation: [ˈʃʁœk]) is a borough (Ortsbezirk) of Marburg in Hesse.

Schröck has a population of 1,755 (2019) and was first mentioned around 1233 under the name of Scrikkede. The village has one primary school and various sporting places, such as a tennis hall and an outdoor sports arena.
