= Bortshausen =

- Borough of Marburg
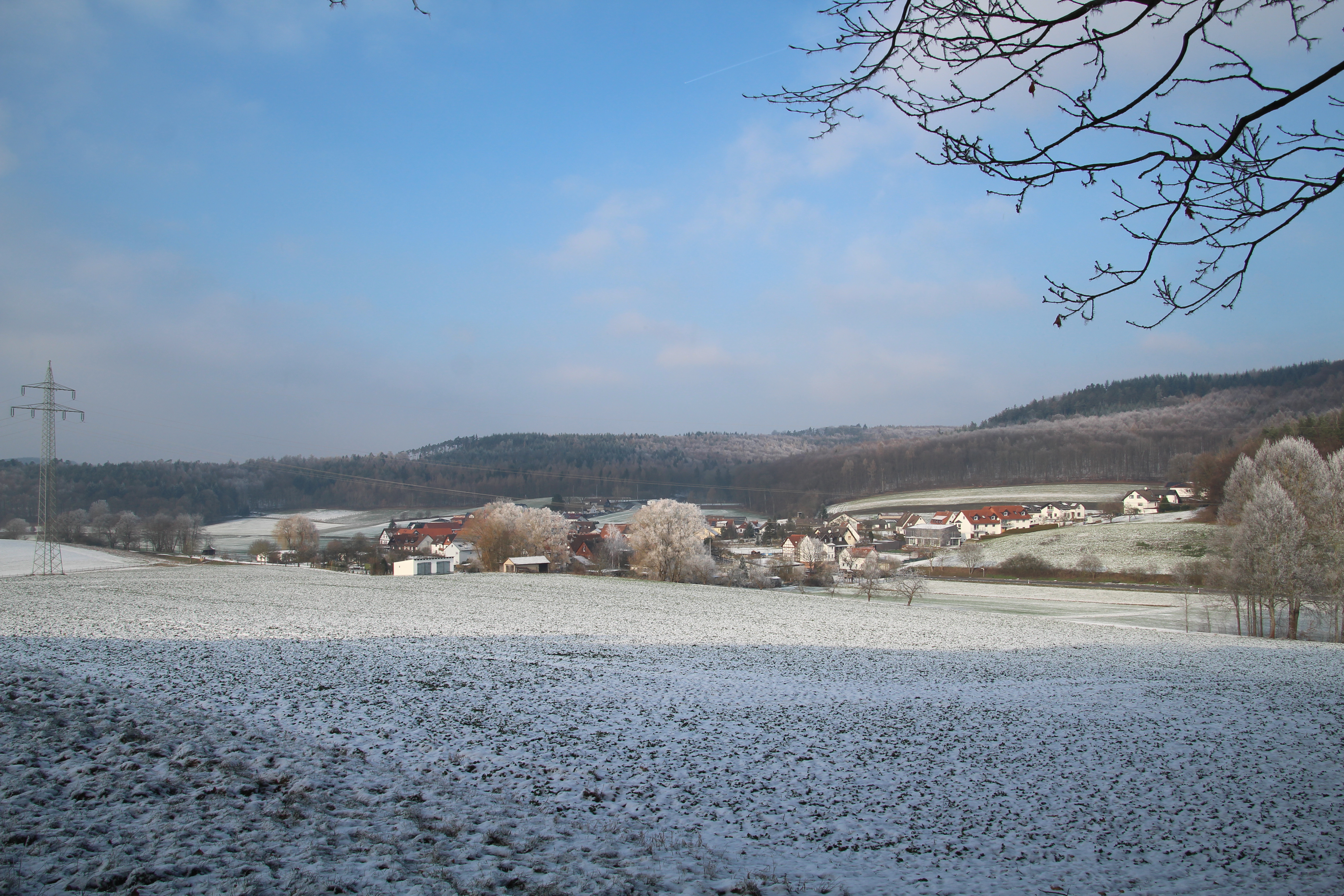

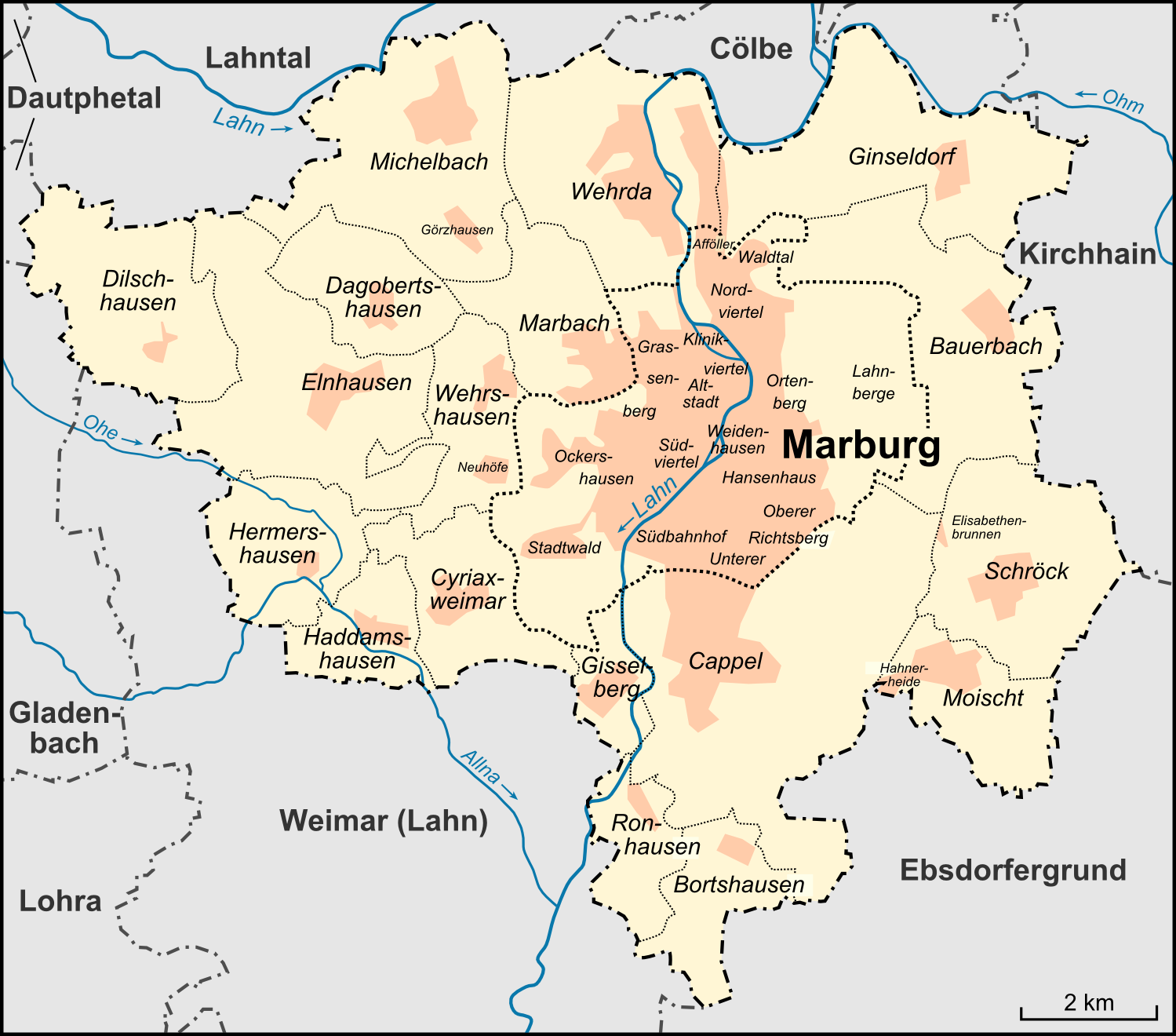
- Stadtteile of Marburg
- Interactive map of Bortshausen
- Location within Germany Location within Hesse
- Coordinates: 50°45′N 08°47′E
- Country: Germany
- State: Hesse
- District: Marburg-Biedenkopf
- City: Marburg

Area
  - Total: 2.12 km^{2} (0.82 sq mi)
- Elevation: 200–220 m (660–720 ft)

Population (2019-12-31)
  - Total: 234
  - Density: 110/km^{2} (286/sq mi)
- Time zone: UTC+01:00 (CET)
  - Summer (DST): UTC+02:00 (CEST)
- Postal codes: 35043
- Dialling codes: 06421

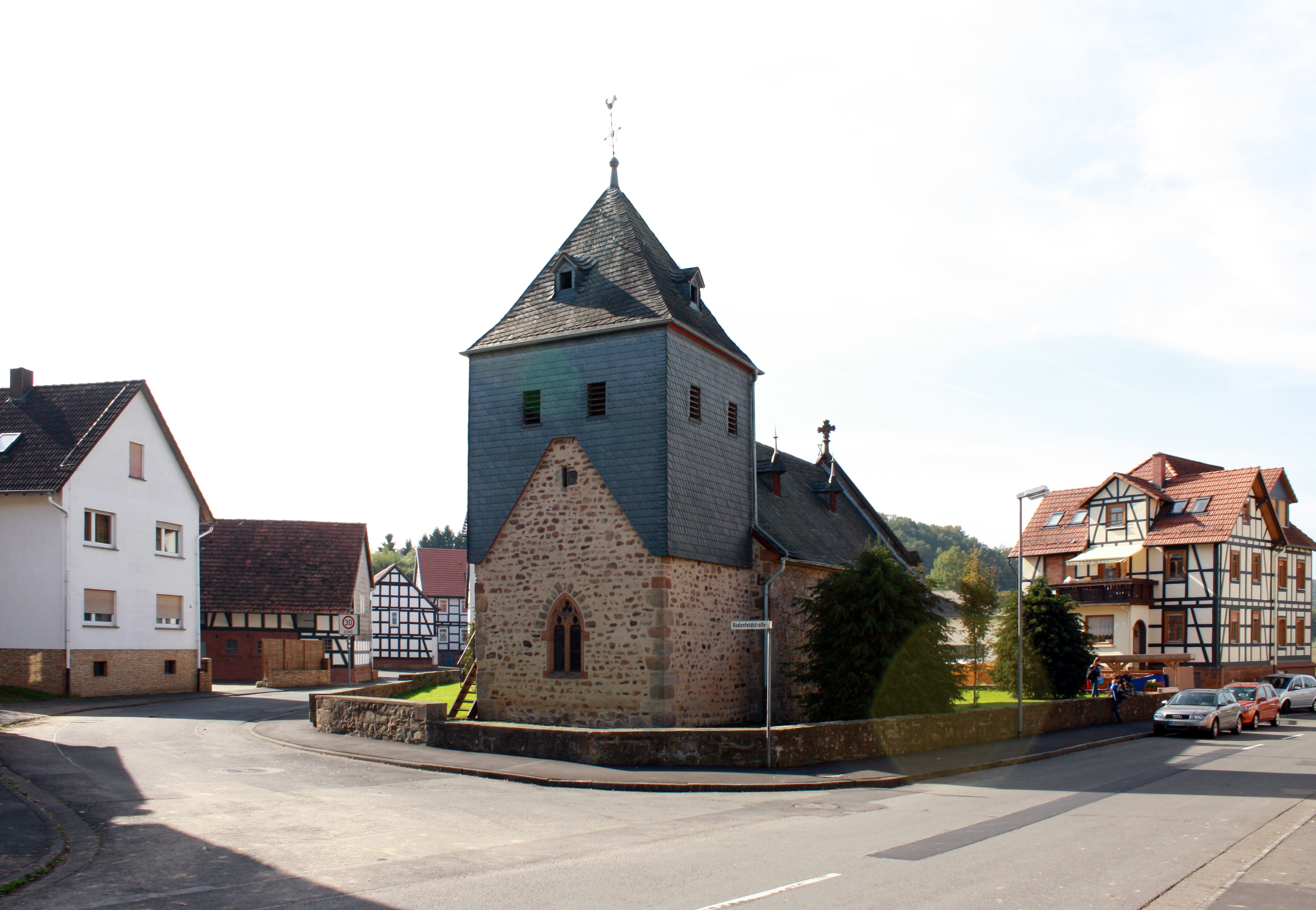
Church of Bortshausen

Bortshausen is a borough (Ortsbezirk) of Marburg in Hesse.
