= Ginseldorf =

- Borough of Marburg
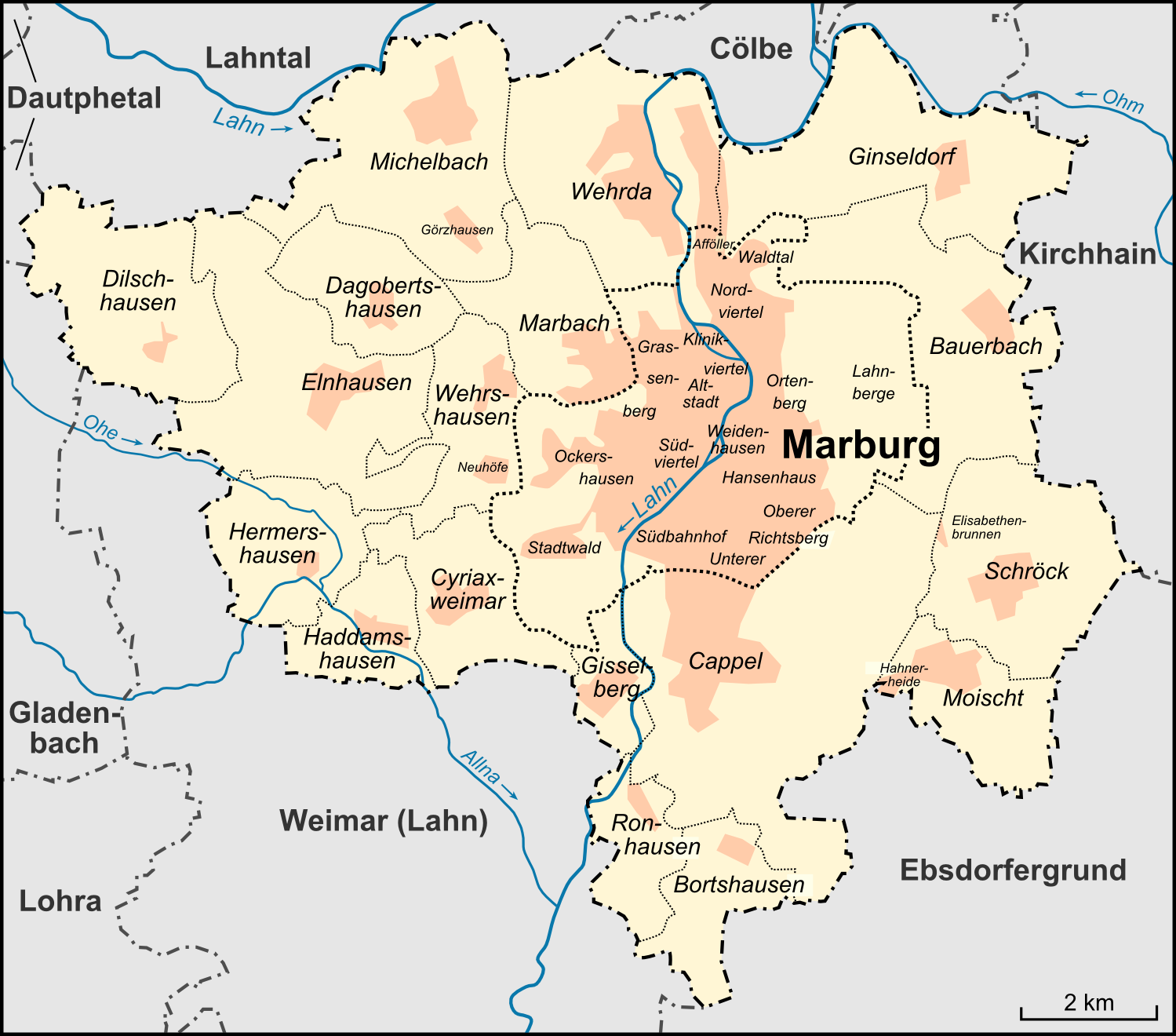
- Stadtteile of Marburg
- Interactive map of Ginseldorf
- Location within Germany Location within Hesse
- Coordinates: 50°50′25″N 8°49′13″E
- Country: Germany
- State: Hesse
- District: Marburg-Biedenkopf
- City: Marburg

Area
  - Total: 8.14 km^{2} (3.14 sq mi)
- Elevation: 215 m (705 ft)

Population (2019-12-31)
  - Total: 742
  - Density: 91.2/km^{2} (236/sq mi)
- Time zone: UTC+01:00 (CET)
  - Summer (DST): UTC+02:00 (CEST)
- Postal codes: 35043
- Dialling codes: 06421

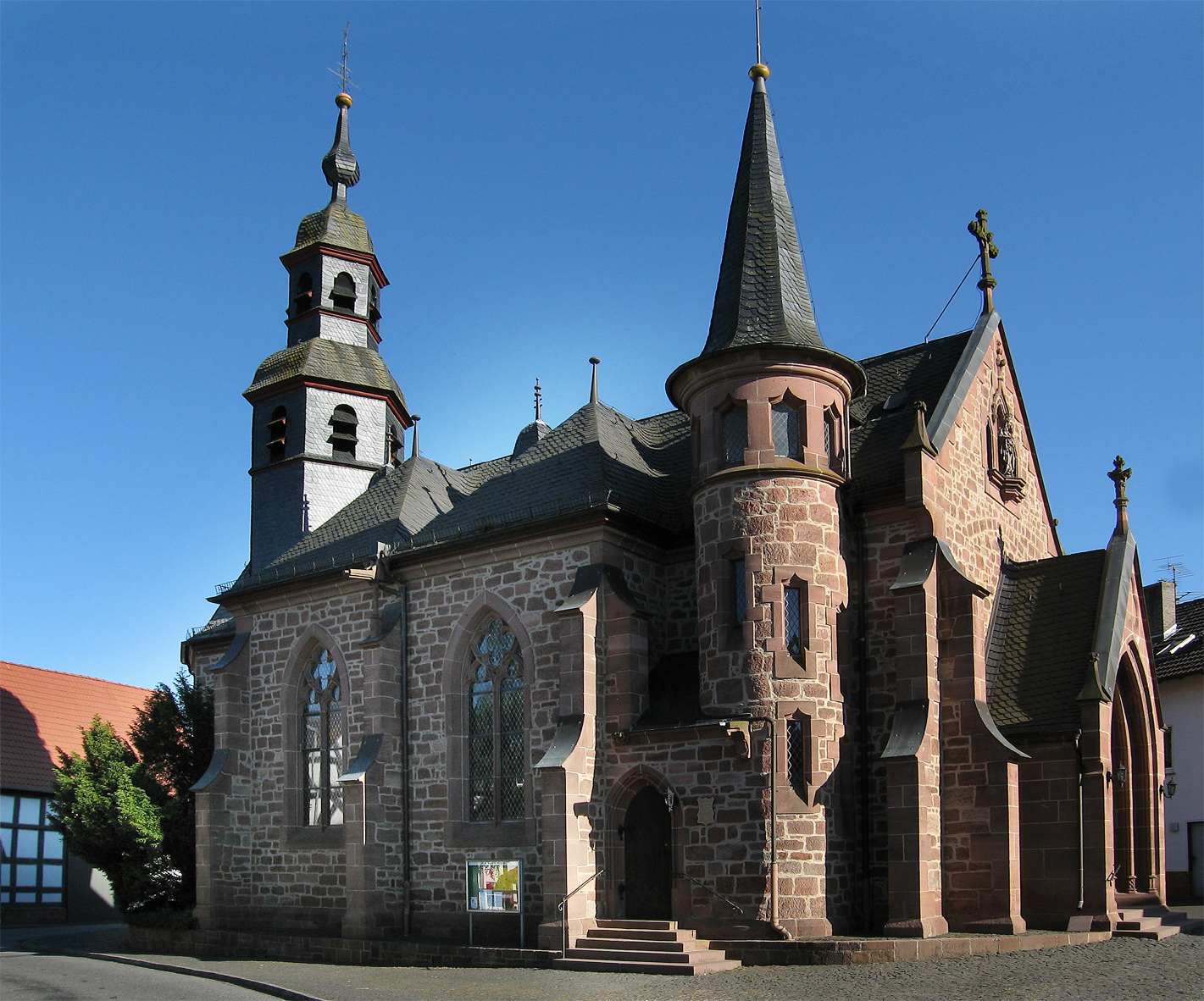
Ginseldorf church

Ginseldorf is a borough (Ortsbezirk) of Marburg in Hesse.
