= Richtsberg =

- Borough of Marburg
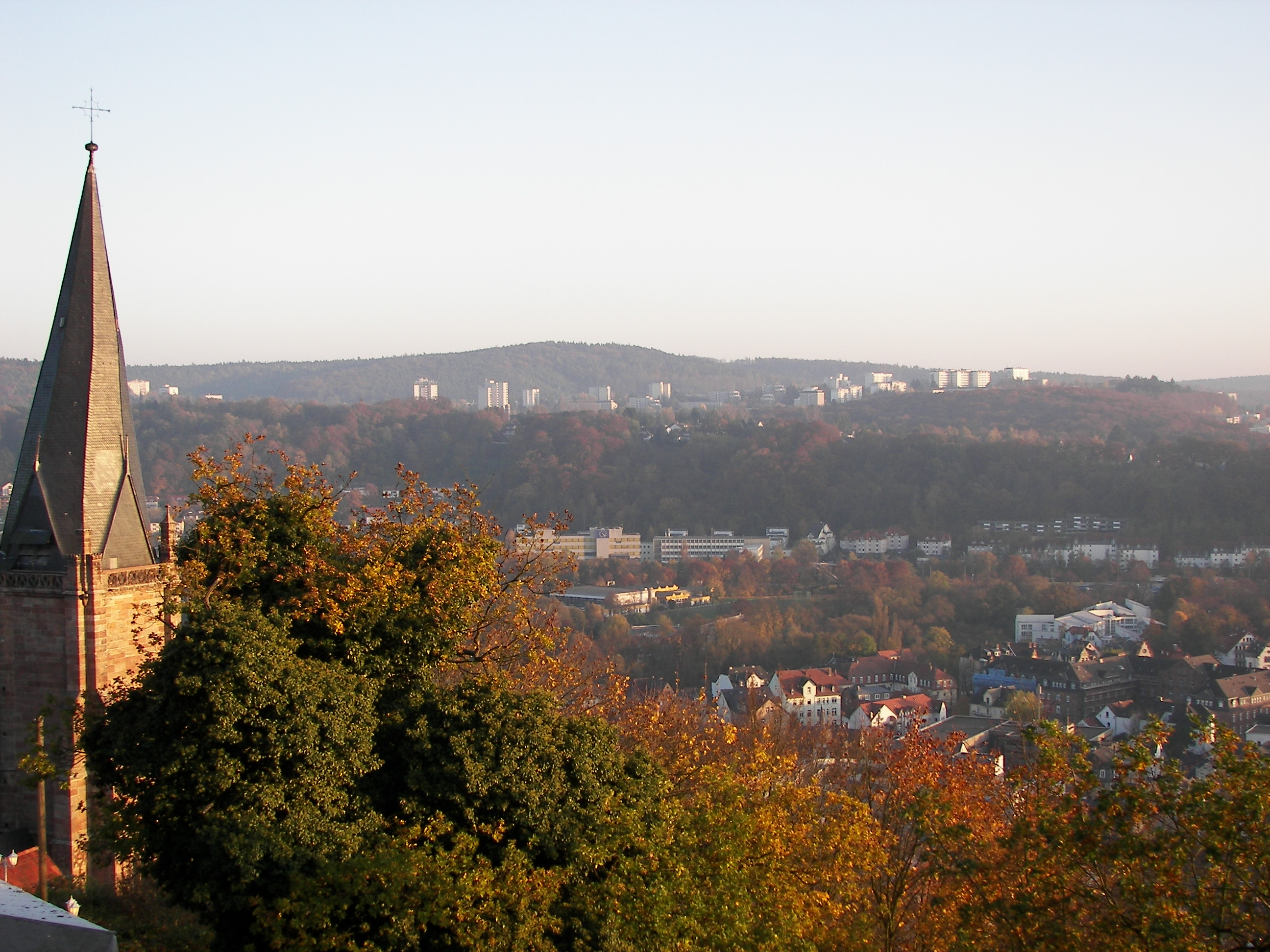
- Richtsberg

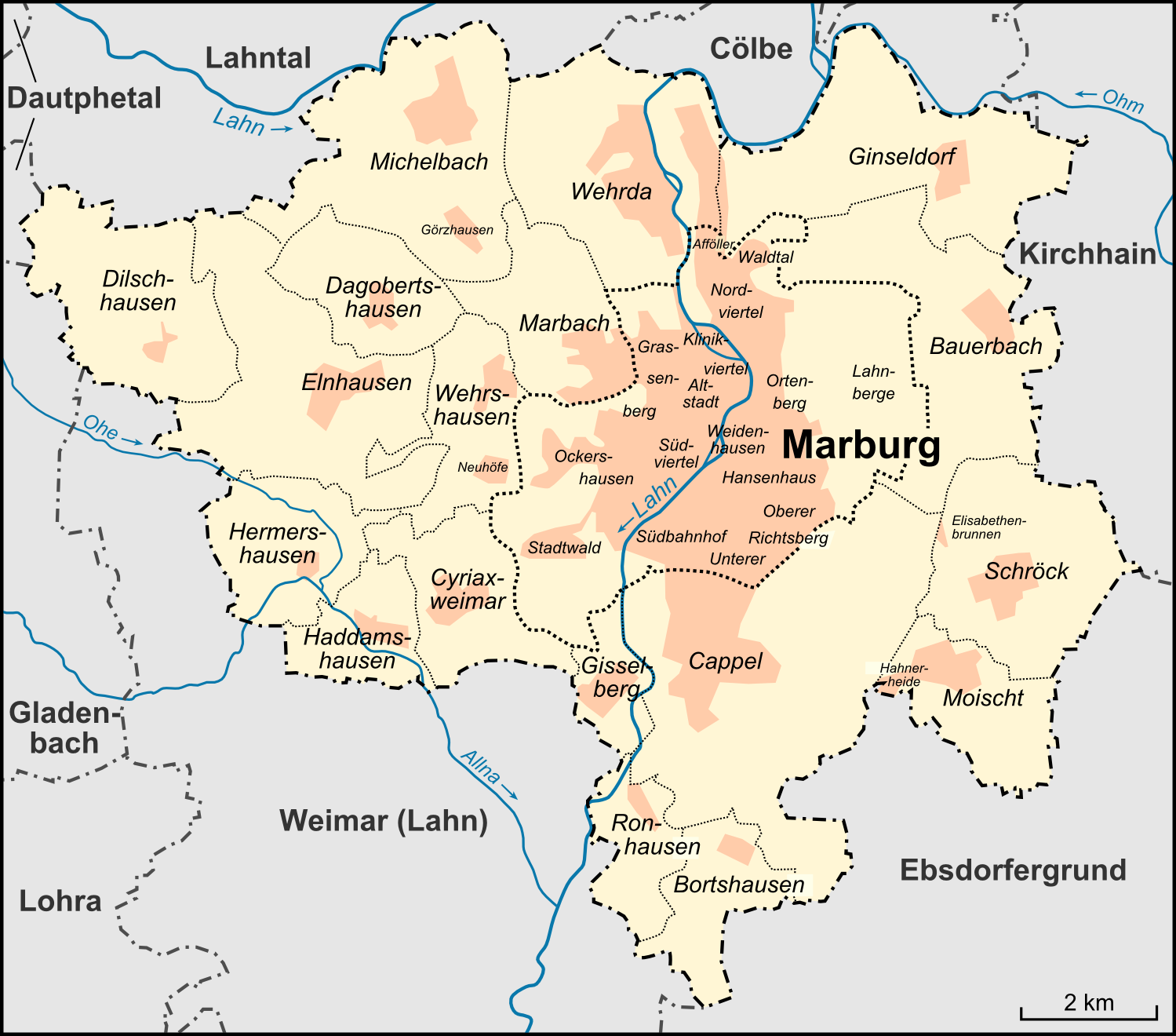
- Stadtteile of Marburg
- Interactive map of Richtsberg
- Location within Germany Location within Hesse
- Coordinates: 50°47′N 8°47′E
- Country: Germany
- State: Hesse
- District: Marburg-Biedenkopf
- City: Marburg

Population (2010-12-31)
  - Total: 9,101
- Time zone: UTC+01:00 (CET)
  - Summer (DST): UTC+02:00 (CEST)
- Postal codes: 35039
- Dialling codes: 06421

Richtsberg is a borough (Ortsbezirk) of Marburg in Hesse.
