= Gisselberg =

- Borough of Marburg
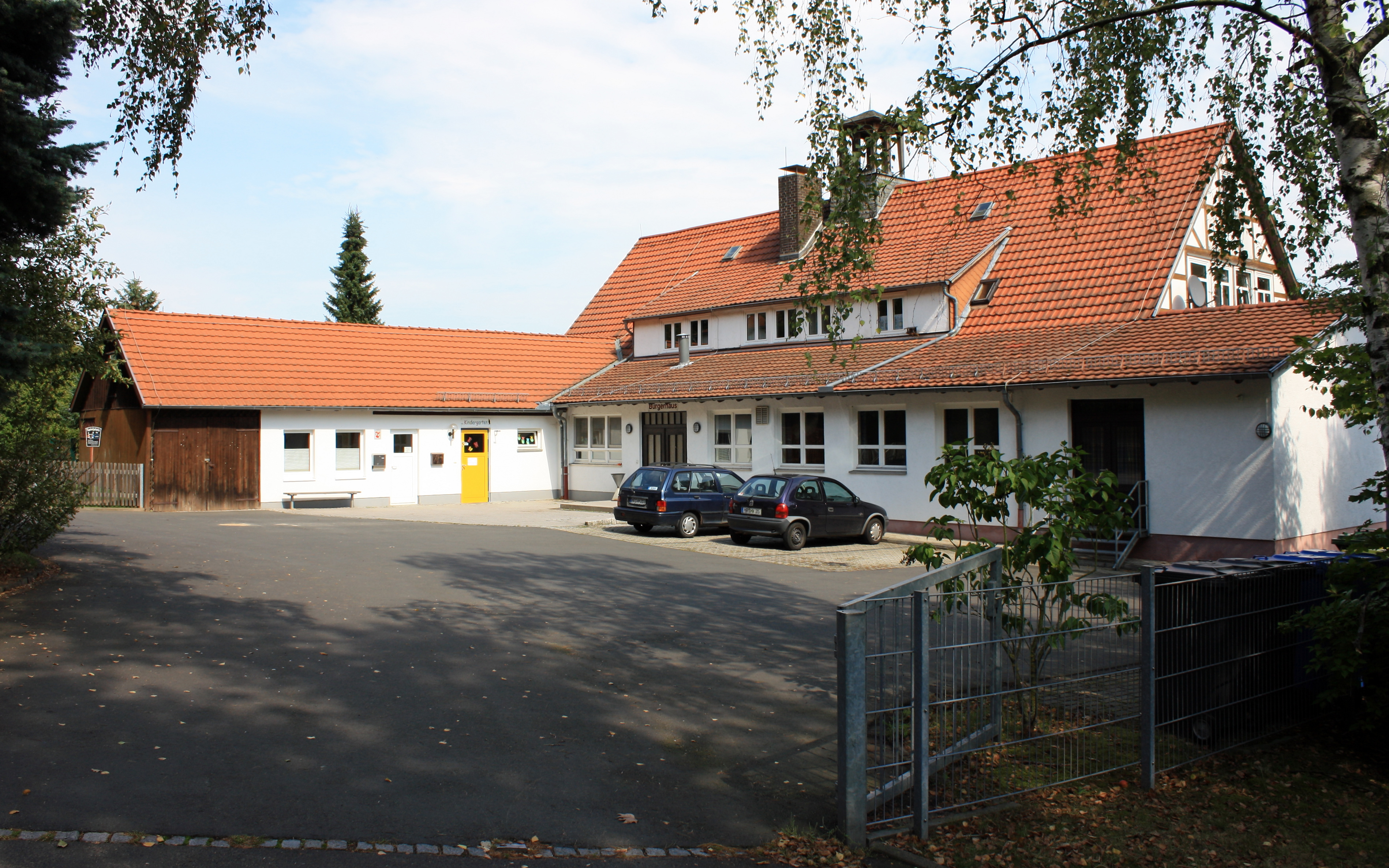
- Bürgerhaus Gisselberg

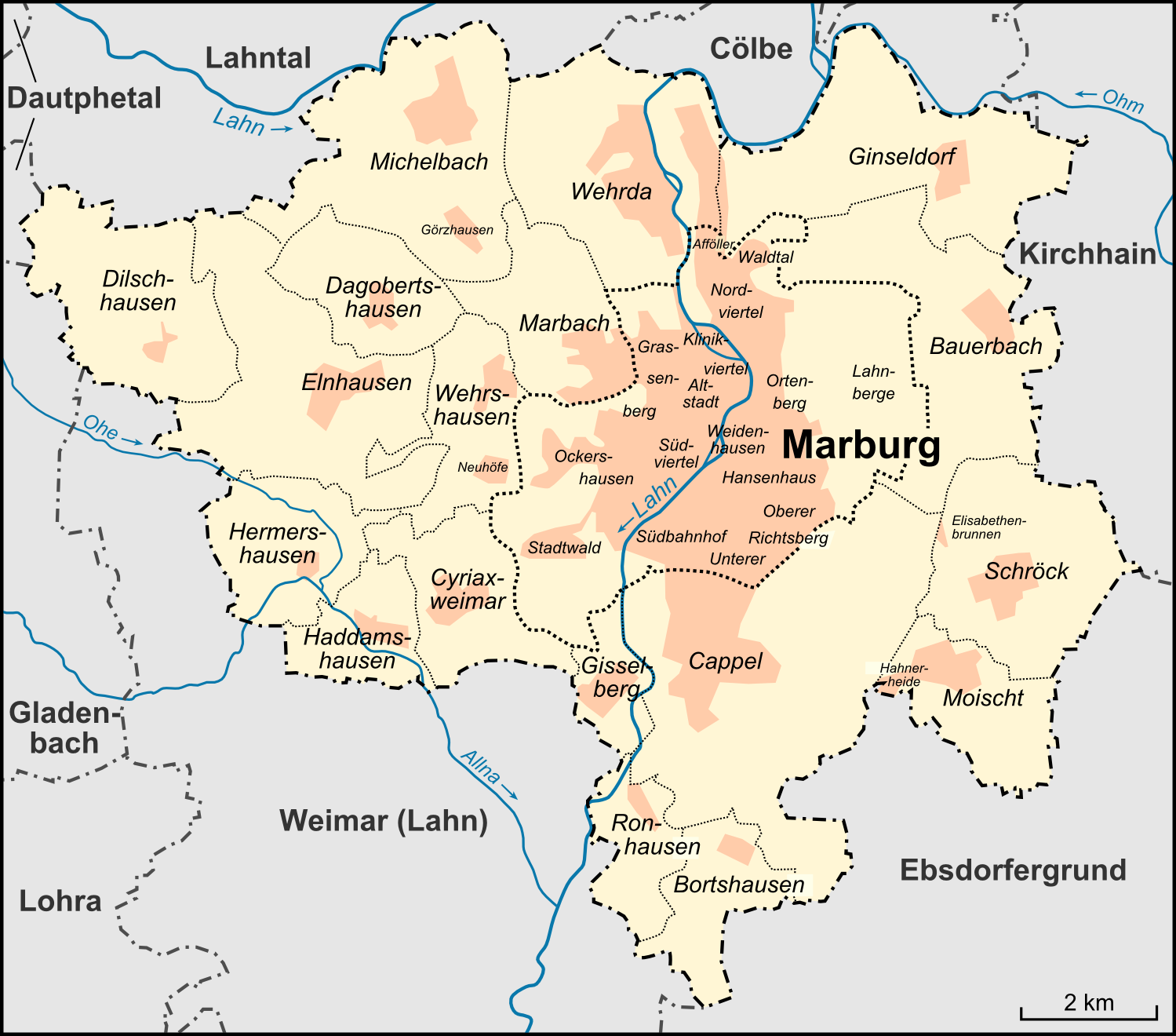
- Stadtteile of Marburg
- Interactive map of Gisselberg
- Location within Germany Location within Hesse
- Coordinates: 50°46′21″N 8°45′0″E
- Country: Germany
- State: Hesse
- District: Marburg-Biedenkopf
- City: Marburg

Area
  - Total: 1.77 km^{2} (0.68 sq mi)
- Elevation: 176–290 m (577–951 ft)

Population (2019-12-31)
  - Total: 907
  - Density: 512/km^{2} (1,330/sq mi)
- Time zone: UTC+01:00 (CET)
  - Summer (DST): UTC+02:00 (CEST)
- Postal codes: 35043
- Dialling codes: 06421

Gisselberg is a borough (Ortsbezirk) of Marburg in Hesse.
