= Marburg =

Town in Hesse, Germany

- Town
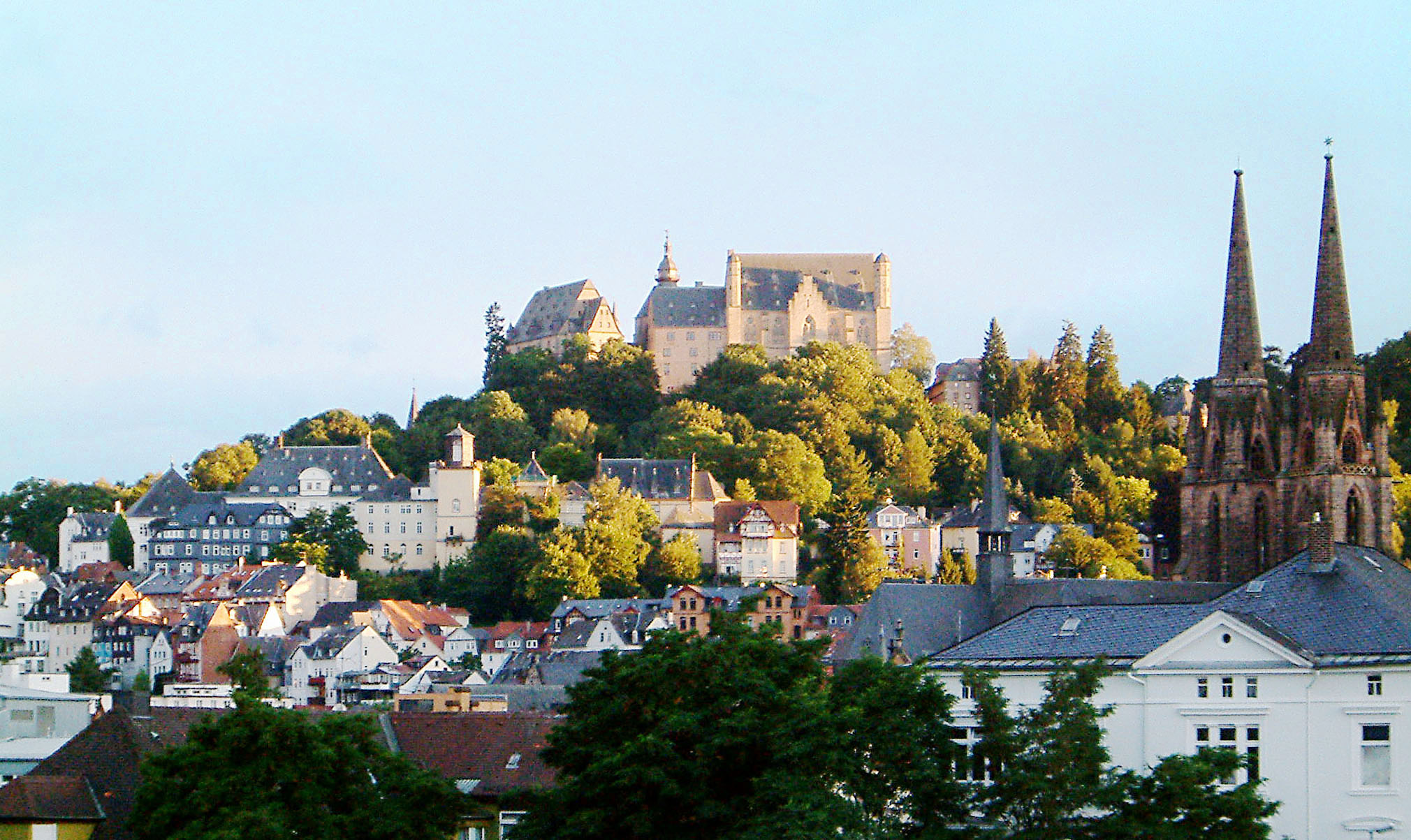
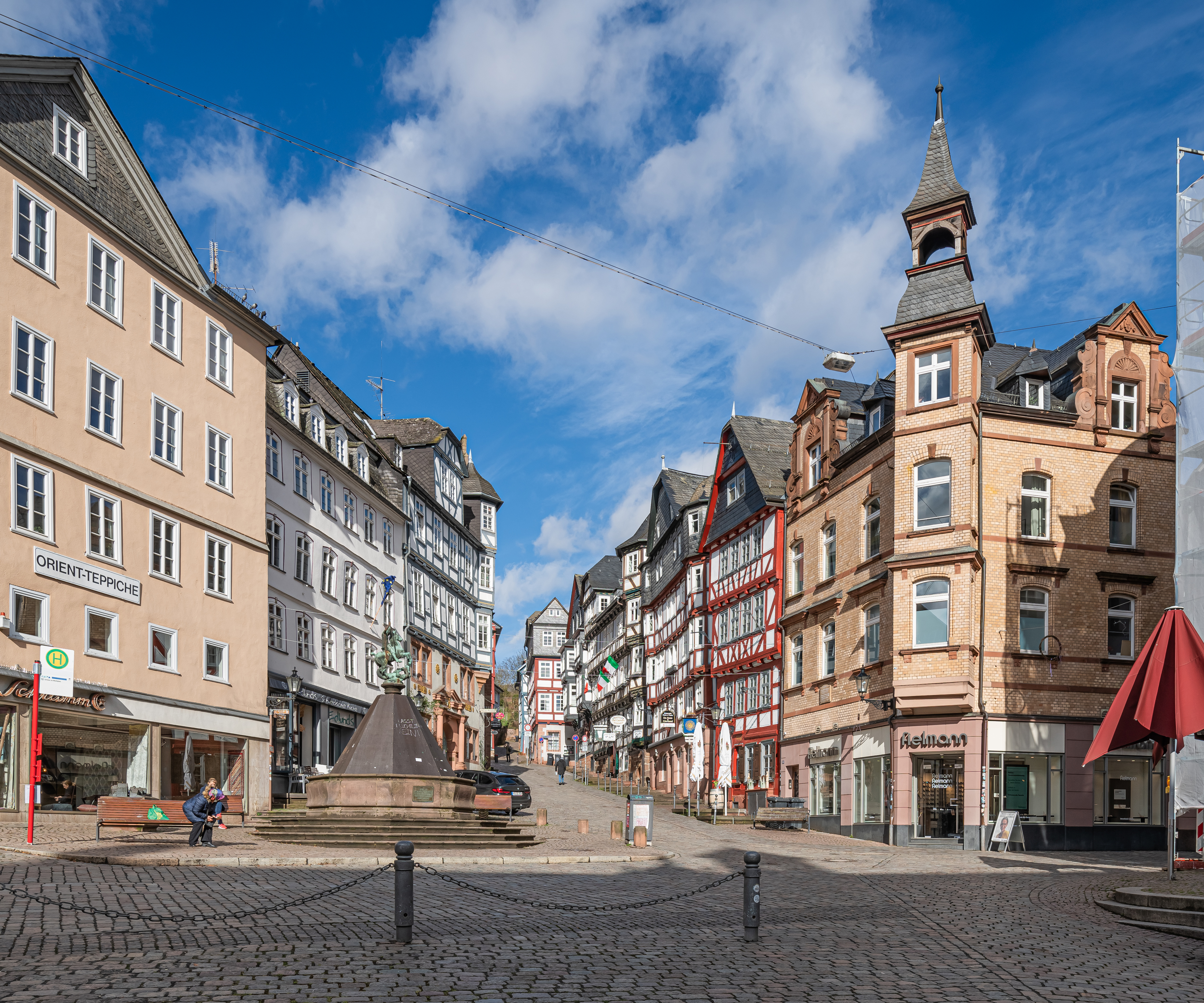
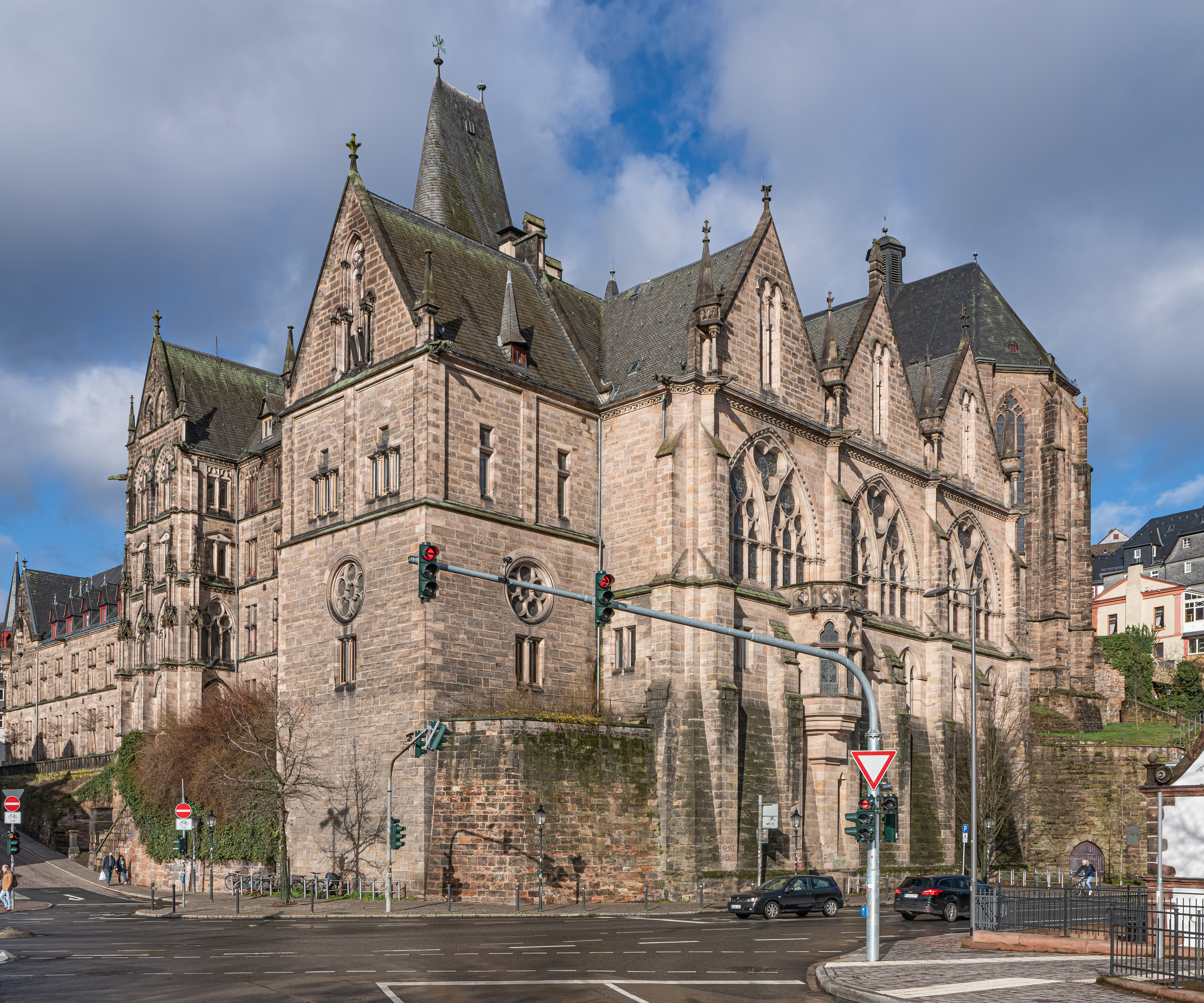
- Marburg, dominated by the castle and St. Elizabeth's Church Market Square Old University

- Coat of arms

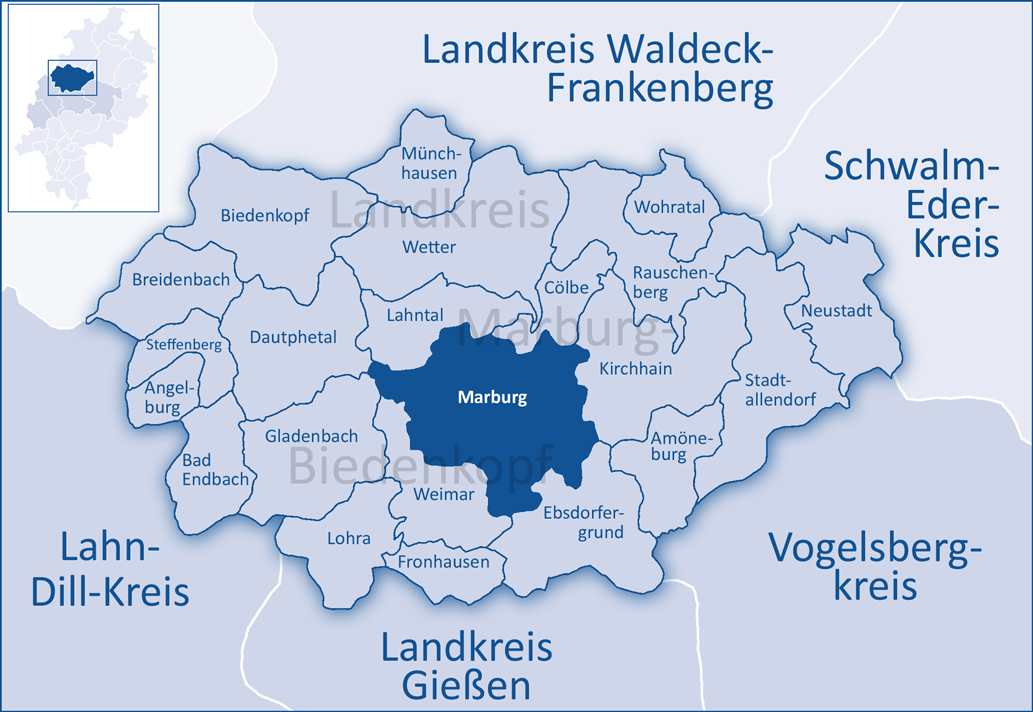
- Location of Marburg within Marburg-Biedenkopf district
- Interactive map of Marburg
- Location within Germany Location within Hesse
- Coordinates: 50°48′36″N 08°46′15″E
- Country: Germany
- State: Hesse
- District: Marburg-Biedenkopf
- Subdivisions: 25 Ortsbezirke

Government
  - Mayor (2021–27): Thomas Spies (SPD)

Area
  - Total: 123.92 km^{2} (47.85 sq mi)
- Elevation: 173–412 m (568–1,352 ft)

Population (2025-12-31)
  - Total: 73,571
  - Density: 593.70/km^{2} (1,537.7/sq mi)
- Time zone: UTC+01:00 (CET)
  - Summer (DST): UTC+02:00 (CEST)
- Postal codes: 35001-35043
- Dialling codes: 06421, 06420, 06424
- Vehicle registration: MR
- Website: www.marburg.de

Marburg (/ˈmɑːrbʊərk/; German: [ˈmaːɐ̯bʊʁk] or [ˈmaʁbʊʁk]) is a university town in the German state (Land) of Hesse and the capital of the Marburg-Biedenkopf district (Landkreis). The town area spreads along the valley of the river Lahn and has a population of approximately 76,000.

Having been awarded town privileges in 1222, Marburg served as capital of the landgraviate of Hessen-Marburg during periods of the 15th to 17th centuries. The University of Marburg was founded in 1527 and dominates the public life in the town to this day.

Marburg is a historic centre of the pharmaceutical industry in Germany, and there is a plant in the town (by BioNTech) to produce vaccines to tackle COVID-19.

== History ==
=== Founding and early history ===
Like many settlements, Marburg developed at the crossroads of two important early medieval highways: the trade route linking Cologne and Prague and the trade route from the North Sea to the Alps and on to Italy, the former crossing the river Lahn here. A first mention of the settlement dates from 822 in the Reinhardsbrunner Chronik. The settlement was protected and customs were raised by a small castle built during the ninth or tenth century by the Giso. Marburg has been a town since 1140, as proven by coins. From the Gisos, it fell around that time to the Landgraves of Thuringia, residing on the Wartburg above Eisenach.

=== St. Elizabeth of Hungary ===
In 1228, the widowed princess-landgravine of Thuringia, Elizabeth of Hungary, chose Marburg as her dowager seat, as she did not get along well with her brother-in-law, the new landgrave. The countess dedicated her life to the sick and would become after her early death in 1231, aged 24, one of the most prominent female saints of the era. She was canonized in 1235.

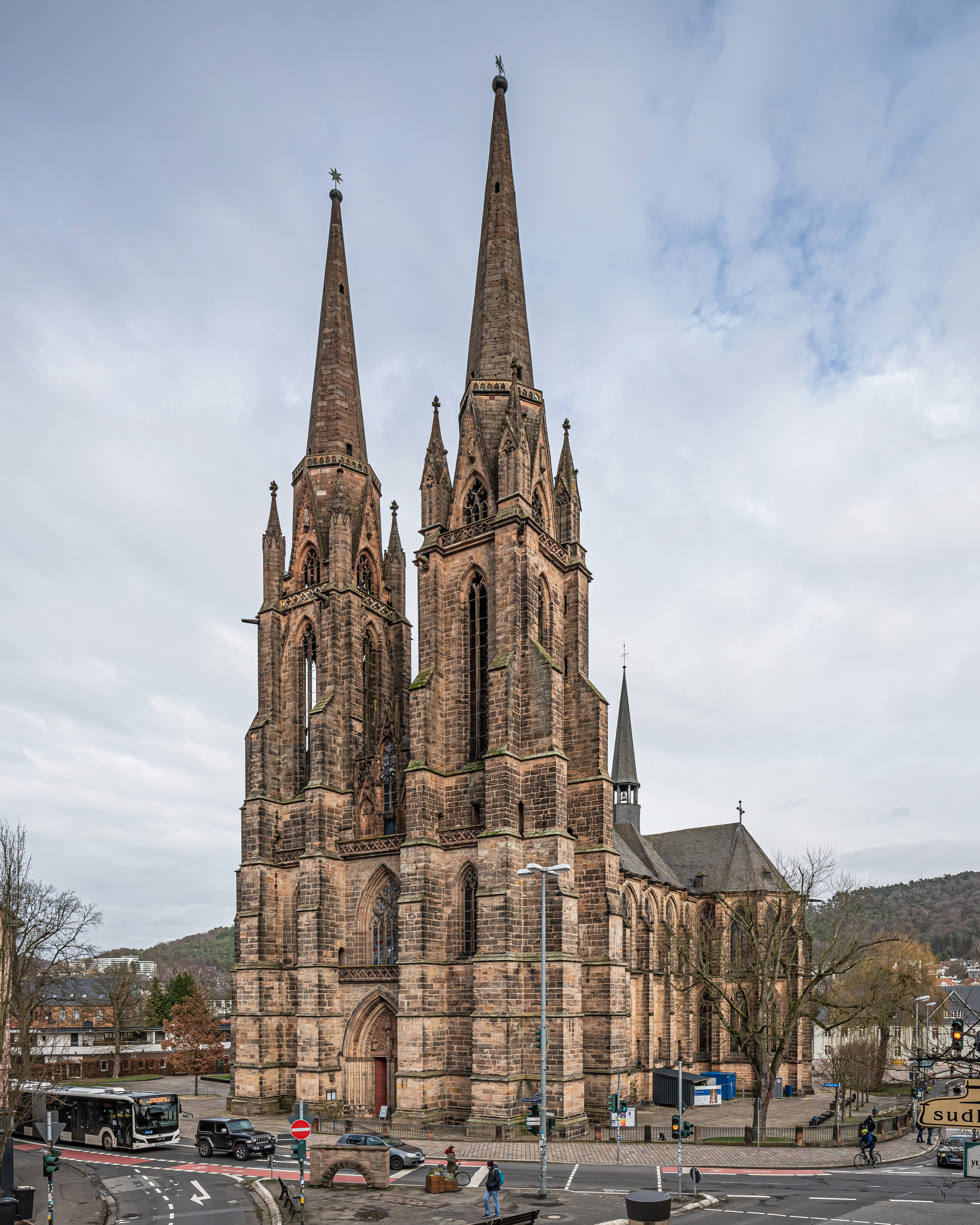
St. Elizabeth Church

=== Capital of Hessen ===
In 1264, St Elizabeth's daughter Sophie of Brabant, succeeded in winning the Landgraviate of Hessen, hitherto connected to Thuringia, for her son Henry. Marburg (alongside Kassel) was one of the capitals of Hessen from that time until about 1540. Following the first division of the landgraviate, it was the capital of Hessen-Marburg from 1485 to 1500 and again between 1567 and 1605. Hessen was one of the more powerful second-tier principalities in Germany. Its "old enemy" was the Archbishopric of Mainz, the seat of one of the prince-electors, who competed with Hessen in many wars and conflicts for coveted territory, stretching over several centuries.

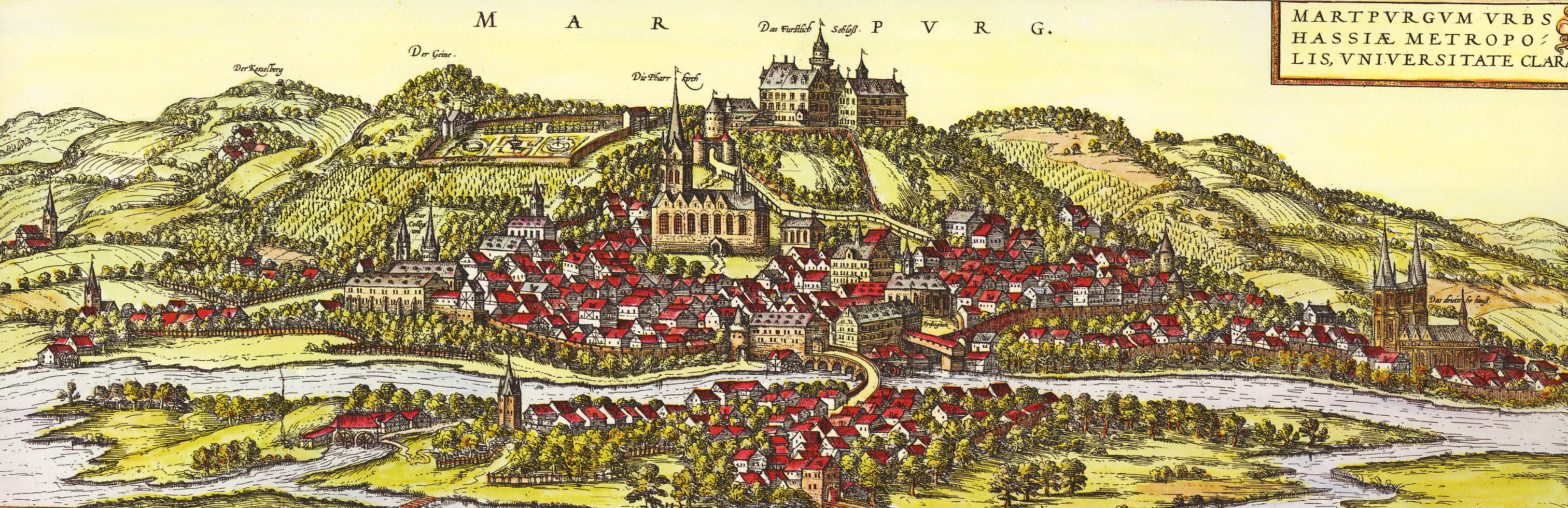
Marburg from Georg Braun and Frans Hogenberg's atlas Civitates orbis terrarum, 1572

After 1605, Marburg became just another provincial town, known mostly for the University of Marburg. It became a virtual backwater for two centuries after the Thirty Years' War (1618–48), when it was fought over by Hessen-Darmstadt and Hesse-Kassel. The Hessian territory around Marburg lost more than two-thirds of its population, which was more than in any later wars (including World War I and World War II) combined.

=== Reformation ===
Marburg is the seat of the oldest existing Protestant-founded university in the world, the University of Marburg (Philipps-Universität-Marburg), founded in 1527. It is one of the smaller "university towns" in Germany. These include Greifswald, Erlangen, Jena, and Tübingen, as well as the city of Gießen, which is located 30 km south of Marburg.

In 1529, Philipp I of Hesse arranged the Marburg Colloquy, to propitiate Martin Luther and Huldrych Zwingli.

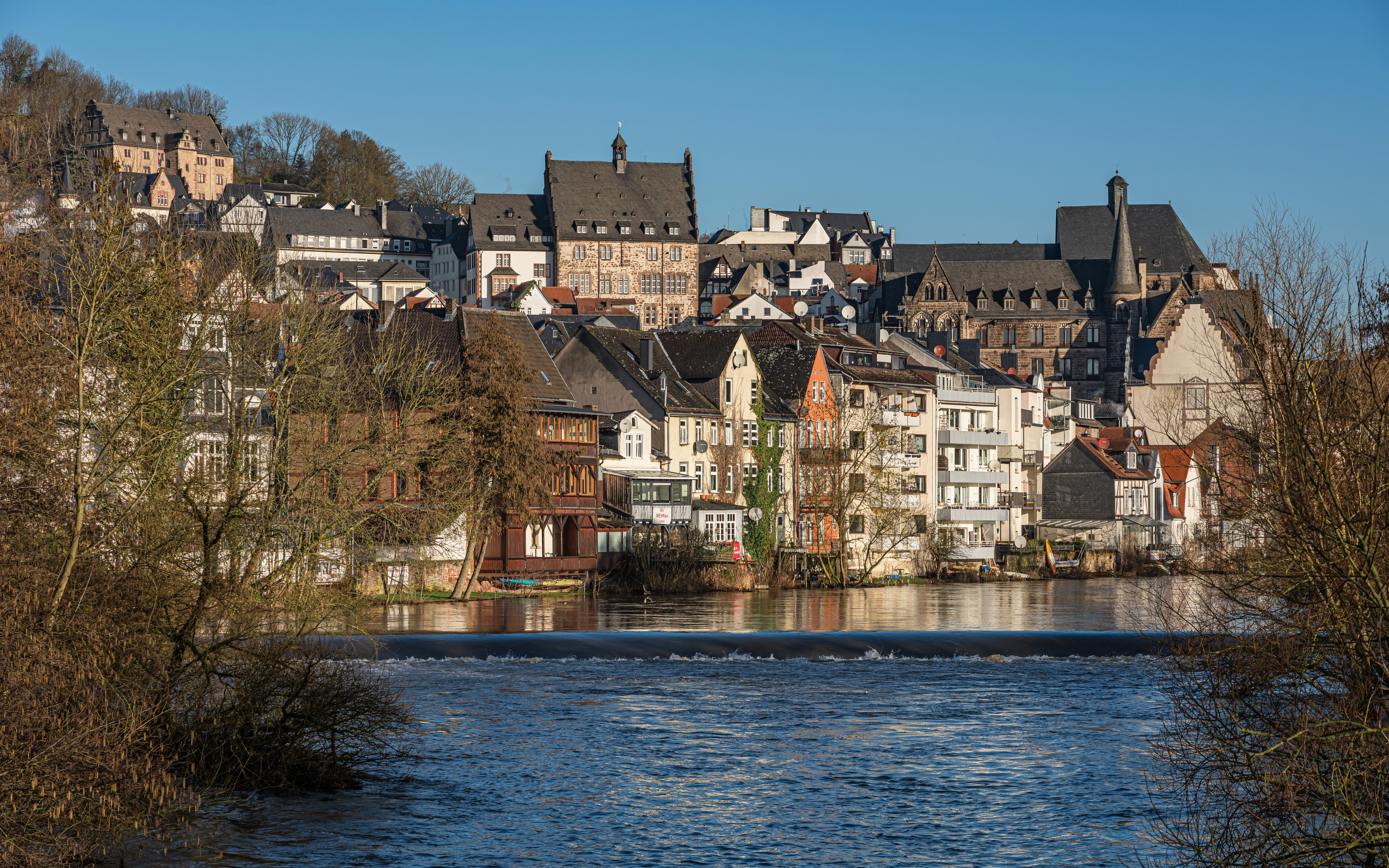
View of Marburg and the Lahn

=== Romanticism ===
Owing to its neglect during the entire 18th century, Marburg – like Rye or Chartres – survived as a relatively intact Gothic town, simply because there was no money spent on any new architecture or expansion. When Romanticism became the dominant cultural and artistic paradigm in Germany, Marburg became a centre of activities once again, and many of the leaders of the movement lived, taught, or studied in Marburg. They formed a circle of friends that was of great importance, especially in literature, philology, folklore, and law.

The group included Friedrich Carl von Savigny, the most important jurist of his day and father of the Roman Law adaptation in Germany, as well as the poets, writers, and social activists Achim von Arnim, Clemens Brentano, and especially Bettina von Arnim, Clemens Brentano's sister, who became Achim von Arnim's wife. Most famous internationally, however, were the Brothers Grimm, who collected many of their fairy tales here. The best-known illustrations for the fairy tale editions are by the painter Otto Ubbelohde, who also lived in and near Marburg. The original building inspiring his drawing Rapunzel's Tower stands in Amönau near Marburg. Across the Lahn hills, in the area called Schwalm, the costumes of little girls included a red hood.

=== Prussian town ===
In the Austro-Prussian War of 1866, the Prince-elector of Hessen had backed Austria. Prussia won and took the opportunity to invade and annex the Electorate of Hessen (as well as Hanover, the city of Frankfurt, and other territories) north of the Main River. However, the pro-Austrian Hesse-Darmstadt remained independent. For Marburg, this turn of events was very positive, because Prussia decided to make Marburg its main administrative centre in this part of the new province Hessen-Nassau and to turn the University of Marburg into the regional academic centre. Thus, Marburg's rise as an administrative and university city began. As the Prussian university system was one of the best in the world at the time, Marburg attracted many respected scholars. However, there was hardly any industry to speak of, so students, professors, and civil servants – who generally had enough but not much money and paid very little in taxes – dominated the town.

=== Early 20th century ===
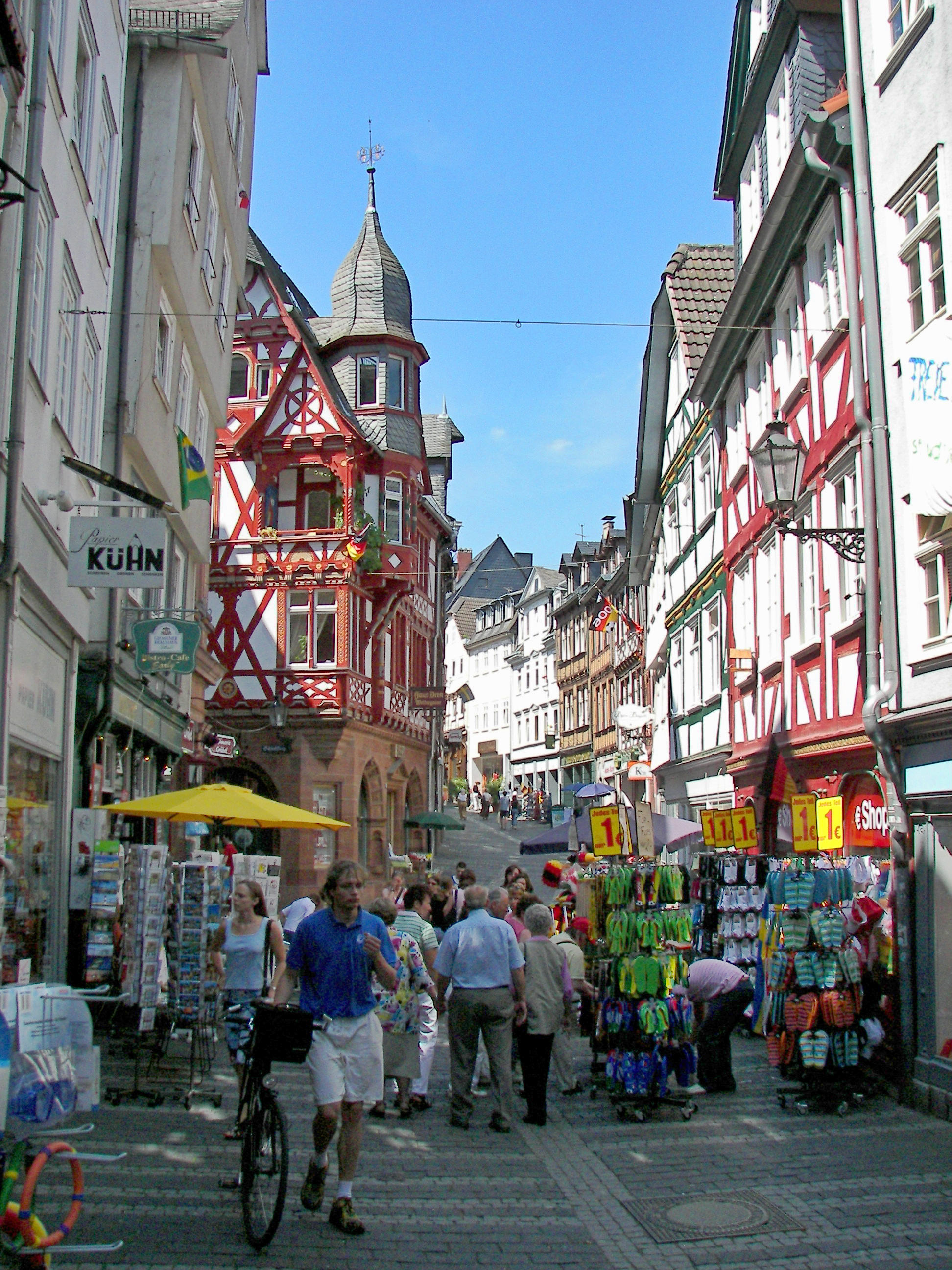
The Wettergasse in the Old City

Franz von Papen, vice-chancellor of Germany in 1934, delivered an anti-Nazi speech at the University of Marburg on 17 June.

During World War II, Marburg suffered much less compared to its neighbours Giessen, Siegen and Frankfurt. The city was not seen as a target of opportunity by the Allies and lacked any important industrial sites. Nonetheless, it was still bombed 13 times, mainly by the United States Army Air Forces, during the bombing of Marburg. From 1942 to 1945, the entire city of Marburg was turned into a hospital, with schools and government buildings turned into wards to augment the existing hospitals. By the spring of 1945, there were over 20,000 patients – mostly wounded German soldiers. The most significant damage happened at the north side of the city and along the marshalling yards, but the inner city was largely spared, meaning that it survived the war largely intact.

In May 1945, the Monuments men officer Walker Hancock set up the first so-called Central Collecting Point in the Marburg State Archives. But since the capacity of the archive building was not sufficient to store the many objects and since other collecting points, for example in Munich, had been set up in the American occupation zone in the meantime, the Marburg facility was closed after more than a year in favor of the Wiesbaden Collecting Point. With the relocation of the sarcophagus of Field Marshal and President Paul von Hindenburg (1847–1934) to the Elisabethkirche in August 1946 the project ended. Milton Mayer's 1955 book They Thought They Were Free, which attempted to gauge how ordinary German citizens felt about Nazi Germany, used interviews of ten men from Marburg (which it called "Kronenberg") as its case study.

=== Marburg from 1945 ===
Post-war developments included population growth at first due to war refugees, then to increasing significance of the pharmaceutical industry based in Marburg, and an increase in staff and students for the university. The historic town was in danger of thorough decay, but was renovated from 1972. The university now has about 21,000 students (2023).

== Geography ==
Marburg lies on the river Lahn, 25 km north of Gießen. The federal road Bundesstraße 3 connects it with Gießen and Kassel. It is served by Marburg (Lahn) station (long-distance and local trains) and Marburg Süd station (local trains).

The city is divided into the following 25 boroughs (Ortsbezirke):

- Altstadt
- Bauerbach
- Bortshausen
- Campusviertel
- Cappel
- Cyriaxweimar
- Dagobertshausen
- Dilschhausen
- Elnhausen
- Ginseldorf
- Gisselberg
- Haddamshausen
- Hermershausen
- Marbach
- Michelbach
- Moischt
- Ockershausen
- Richtsberg
- Ronhausen
- Schröck
- Südviertel
- Waldtal
- Wehrda
- Wehrshausen
- Weidenhausen

== Politics ==
As a larger mid-sized city, Marburg, like six other such cities in Hessen, has a special status as compared to the other municipalities in the district. This means that the city takes on tasks more usually performed by the district so that in many ways it is comparable to an urban district (kreisfreie Stadt). Before 1974, the city was a district-free city.

The mayor of Marburg, Thomas Spies, in office since December 2015, and his predecessor Egon Vaupel (directly elected in January 2005), are members of the Social Democratic Party of Germany. His deputy, the head of the building and youth departments, Nadine Bernshausen, is from Alliance '90/The Greens. Following the city parliament elections of March 2021, the majority in the 59-seat city parliament is held by a coalition of Green party (15 seats), SPD (14 seats) and Klimaliste (4 seats) members. Also represented are the factions of the Christian Democratic Union (13 seats), The Left (7 seats), the Free Democratic Party (2 seats), a CDU splinter group MBL (Marburger Bürgerliste – 2 seats), the BfM (Bürger für Marburg – 2 seats), Alternative für Deutschland (1 seat), and the Pirate Party (1 seat).

Among the left wing groups are ATTAC, the Worldshop movement, an autonomist-anarchist scene, and a few groups engaged in ecological or human-rights concerns.

The city of Marburg, similar to the cities of Heidelberg, Tübingen and Göttingen, has a rich history of student fraternities or Verbindungen of various sorts, including Corps, Landsmannschaften, Burschenschaften, Turnierschaften, etc.

== Transport ==
The nearest airport is Frankfurt Airport, located 97 km (60 mi) to the south of Marburg.

== Twin towns – sister cities ==
Marburg is twinned with:

- Poitiers, France (1961)
- Maribor, Slovenia (1969)
- Sfax, Tunisia (1971)
- Eisenach, Germany (1988)
- Northampton, England, UK (1992)
- Sibiu, Romania (2005)

== Coat of arms ==
Coat of arms Marburg

Marburg's coat of arms shows a Hessian landgrave riding a white horse with a flag and a shield on a red background. The shield shows the red-and-white-striped Hessian lion, also to be seen on Hessen's state arms, and the flag shows a stylized M, blue on gold (or yellow). The arms are also the source of the city flag's colors. The flag has three horizontal stripes colored, from top to bottom, red (from the background), white (from the horse) and blue (from the shield).

The coat of arms, which was designed in the late nineteenth century, is based on a landgrave seal on a municipal document. It is an example of a very prevalent practice of replacing forgotten coats of arms, or ones deemed not to be representative enough, with motifs taken from seals.

== Marburg virus ==
The city gives its name to the Marburg virus, a filovirus that causes Marburg virus disease, a viral hemorrhagic fever resembling ebola. The virus was first recognized and described during the 1967 Marburg virus disease outbreak, when workers were accidentally exposed to infected green monkey tissue at the city's former industrial plant, the Behring-Werke, then part of Hoechst and today of CSL Behring, founded by Marburg citizen and first Nobel Prize in Medicine winner, Emil Adolf von Behring. During the outbreak, 31 people became infected and seven of them died. The virus is named after the city following the custom of naming viruses after the location of their first recorded outbreak.

== Green city ==
Many homes have solar panels and in 2008 a law was passed to make the installation of solar systems on new buildings or as part of renovation projects mandatory. 20 percent of heating system requirements ought to have been covered by solar energy in new buildings. Anyone who fails to install solar panels would have been fined €1,000. The new law, approved on 20 June 2008, should have taken effect in October 2008, however, this law was stopped by the Regierungspräsidium Giessen in September 2008.

== Climate ==
Climate data for Marburg
Month	Jan	Feb	Mar	Apr	May	Jun	Jul	Aug	Sep	Oct	Nov	Dec	Year
Record high °C (°F)	15.6 (60.1)	19.3 (66.7)	24.7 (76.5)	28.2 (82.8)	30.7 (87.3)	38.0 (100.4)	38.8 (101.8)	37.8 (100.0)	31.3 (88.3)	26.0 (78.8)	22.0 (71.6)	15.1 (59.2)	38.8 (101.8)
Mean daily maximum °C (°F)	5.3 (41.5)	7.3 (45.1)	11.2 (52.2)	16.4 (61.5)	19.9 (67.8)	25.4 (77.7)	24 (75)	22.7 (72.9)	21.1 (70.0)	15.6 (60.1)	8.4 (47.1)	6 (43)	15.3 (59.5)
Daily mean °C (°F)	2.9 (37.2)	2.7 (36.9)	5.4 (41.7)	9.7 (49.5)	13.4 (56.1)	18.7 (65.7)	17.8 (64.0)	16.6 (61.9)	14.1 (57.4)	10.5 (50.9)	5.4 (41.7)	3.7 (38.7)	10.1 (50.2)
Mean daily minimum °C (°F)	0.3 (32.5)	−1.6 (29.1)	−0.2 (31.6)	2.8 (37.0)	6.4 (43.5)	11.5 (52.7)	10.7 (51.3)	10.5 (50.9)	7.7 (45.9)	5.7 (42.3)	2.1 (35.8)	1.1 (34.0)	4.8 (40.6)
Record low °C (°F)	−15.5 (4.1)	−18 (0)	−13.4 (7.9)	−7.2 (19.0)	−6.2 (20.8)	1.0 (33.8)	2.1 (35.8)	3.1 (37.6)	−0.8 (30.6)	−6.2 (20.8)	−11.3 (11.7)	−16.5 (2.3)	−18 (0)
Average precipitation mm (inches)	60 (2.4)	54 (2.1)	44 (1.7)	36 (1.4)	57 (2.2)	44 (1.7)	37 (1.5)	41 (1.6)	48 (1.9)	39 (1.5)	38 (1.5)	69 (2.7)	567 (22.3)
Average rainy days	9	7	9	8	8	8	9	8	8	8	9	10	101
Source 1: Klima Marburg / Lahn (in German), based on 11/2017-10/2022, accessed 9 November 2022
Source 2: Climate Marburg (Hesse) (in german), accessed 26 July 2022

== Landmarks ==
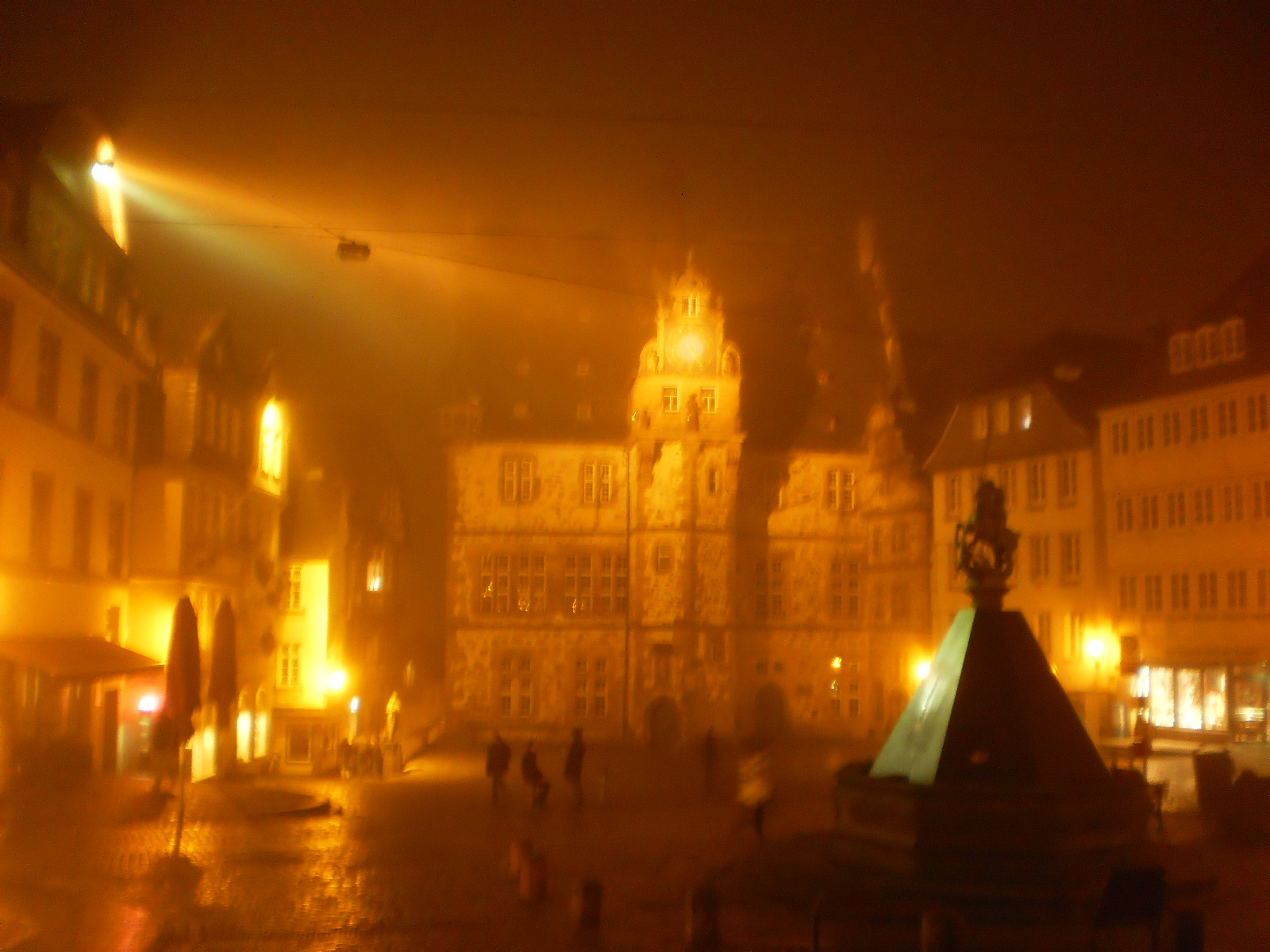
Town hall and market place with fountain (January 2016)

Marburg remains a relatively unspoilt, spire-dominated, castle-crowned Gothic or Renaissance city on a hill partly because it was isolated between 1600 and 1850. Architecturally, it is famous both for its castle Marburger Schloss and its medieval churches. The Elisabethkirche, as one of the two or three first purely Gothic churches north of the Alps outside France, is an archetype of Gothic architecture in Germany.

Much of the physical attractiveness of Marburg is due to Hanno Drechsler who was Lord Mayor between 1970 and 1992. He promoted urban renewal and the restoration of the Oberstadt (upper town) and established one of the first pedestrian zones in Germany. Marburg's Altstadtsanierung (since 1972) has received many awards and prizes.

Parks in the town include the Old Botanical Garden, as well as the new Botanical Garden outside the town proper.

The Marktplatz is the heart of Marburg's old town. In the center is a fountain dedicated to St George, a popular meeting place for young people. To the south is the old town hall and the path running north leads to the palace overlooking the town.

The University of Marburg, founded in 1527, is the world's oldest Protestant university still in existence. It is distributed across two main locations: the Lahntal, comprising 11 sites in and around the city centre, and the Lahnberge, with three sites to the east of the town near the Botanischer Garten (Botanical Garden).

== Notable people ==
- Konrad von Marburg (1180-1233) nobleman, German Catholic Priest, inquisitor and spiritual director of Elizabeth Of Hungary.

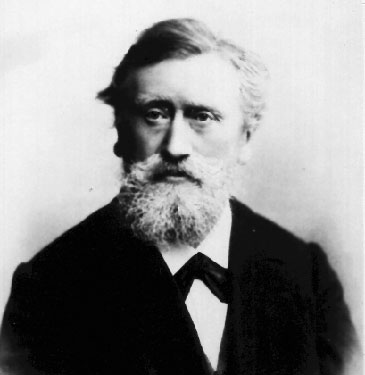
Karl Knies

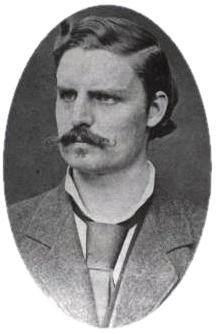
Adolf Fick

- Ernst Wachler (1803–1888), lawyer and politician
- Karl Theodor Bayrhoffer (1812–1888), professor of philosophy at the University of Marburg and freethinker
- Karl Gustav Adolf Knies (1821–1898), economist
- Rudolf Otto (1869–1937), Lutheran theologian and professor at the University of Marburg
- Adolf Gaston Eugen Fick (1852–1937), ophthalmologist and inventor of the contact lens
- Walter von Boetticher (1853–1945), historian and physician studied medicine at Marburg
- Juan Gundlach (1810–1896), naturalist and taxonomist of Cuba and Puerto Rico
- Ernst von Harnack (1888–1945), politician and resistance fighter against Nazism
- Ernst-Günther Schenck (1904–1998), doctor
- Otto John (1909–1997), President of the Federal Office for Constitutional Protection
- Hans Mommsen (1930–2015), historian
- Wolfgang Mommsen (1930–2004), historian
- Reinhard Hauff (born 1939), film director and screenwriter
- Richard Wiese (born 1953), professor of linguistics
- Stefan Gradmann (born 1958), university professor
- Margot Käßmann (born 1958), Lutheran theologian and pastor
- Hank Levine (born 1965), film director and producer
- Dirk Kaftan (born 1971), conductor
- Lars Weißenfeldt (born 1980), footballer
- Lena Gercke (born 1988), photo model and TV host
- Lukas Wenig (born 1994), darts player
- Theodora Sayn-Wittgenstein (born 1986), aristocrat
- Siegfried von Roedern, politician
