= Bauerbach, Marburg =

Bauerbach
- Borough of Marburg
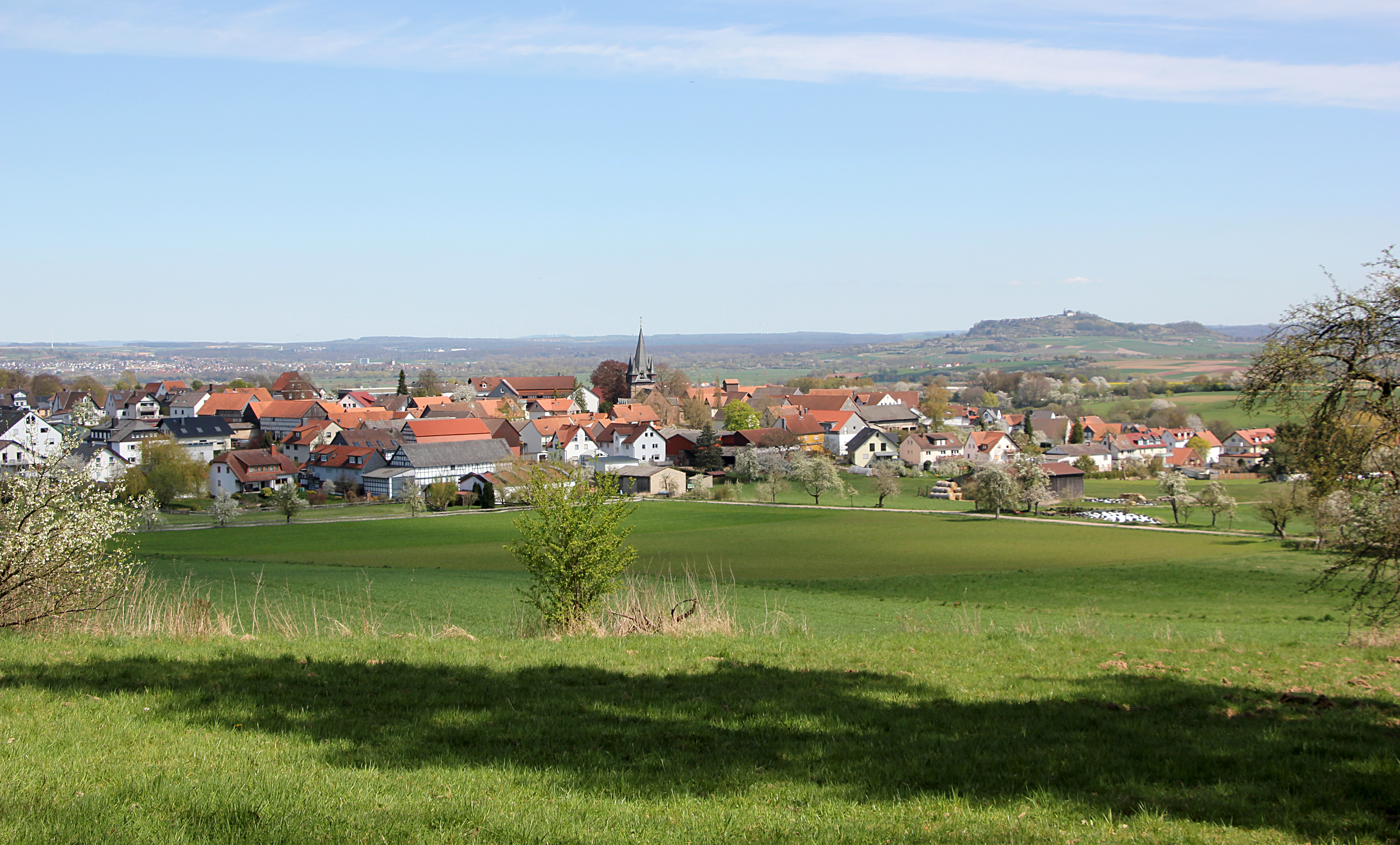
- Bauerbach

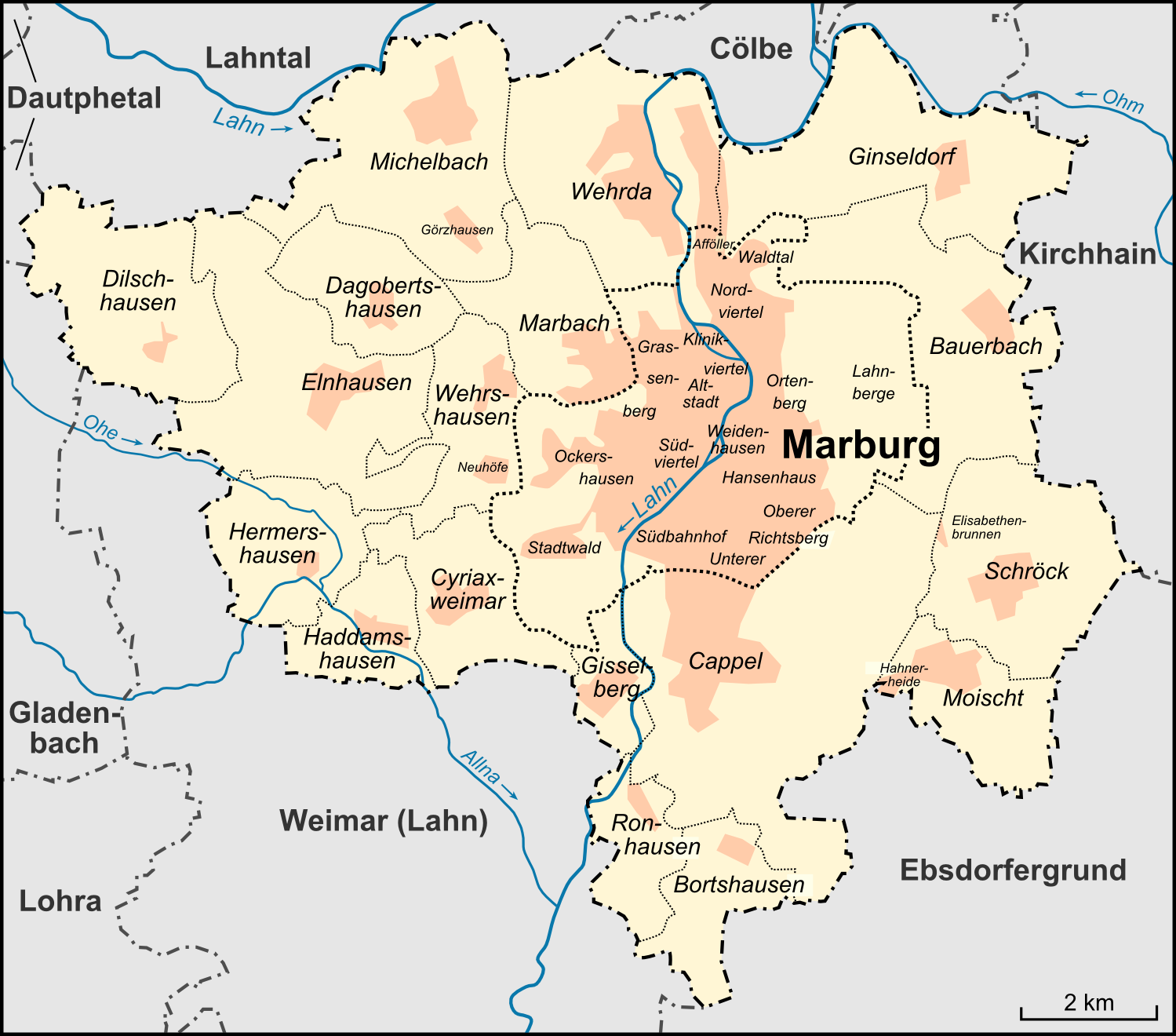
- Stadtteile of Marburg
- Interactive map of Bauerbach
- Location within Germany Location within Hesse
- Coordinates: 50°49′11″N 8°49′42″E
- Country: Germany
- State: Hesse
- District: Marburg-Biedenkopf
- City: Marburg

Area
  - Total: 8.04 km^{2} (3.10 sq mi)
- Elevation: 250 m (820 ft)

Population (2019-12-31)
  - Total: 1,346
  - Density: 167/km^{2} (434/sq mi)
- Time zone: UTC+01:00 (CET)
  - Summer (DST): UTC+02:00 (CEST)
- Postal codes: 35043
- Dialling codes: 06421
- Website: www.marburg-bauerbach.de

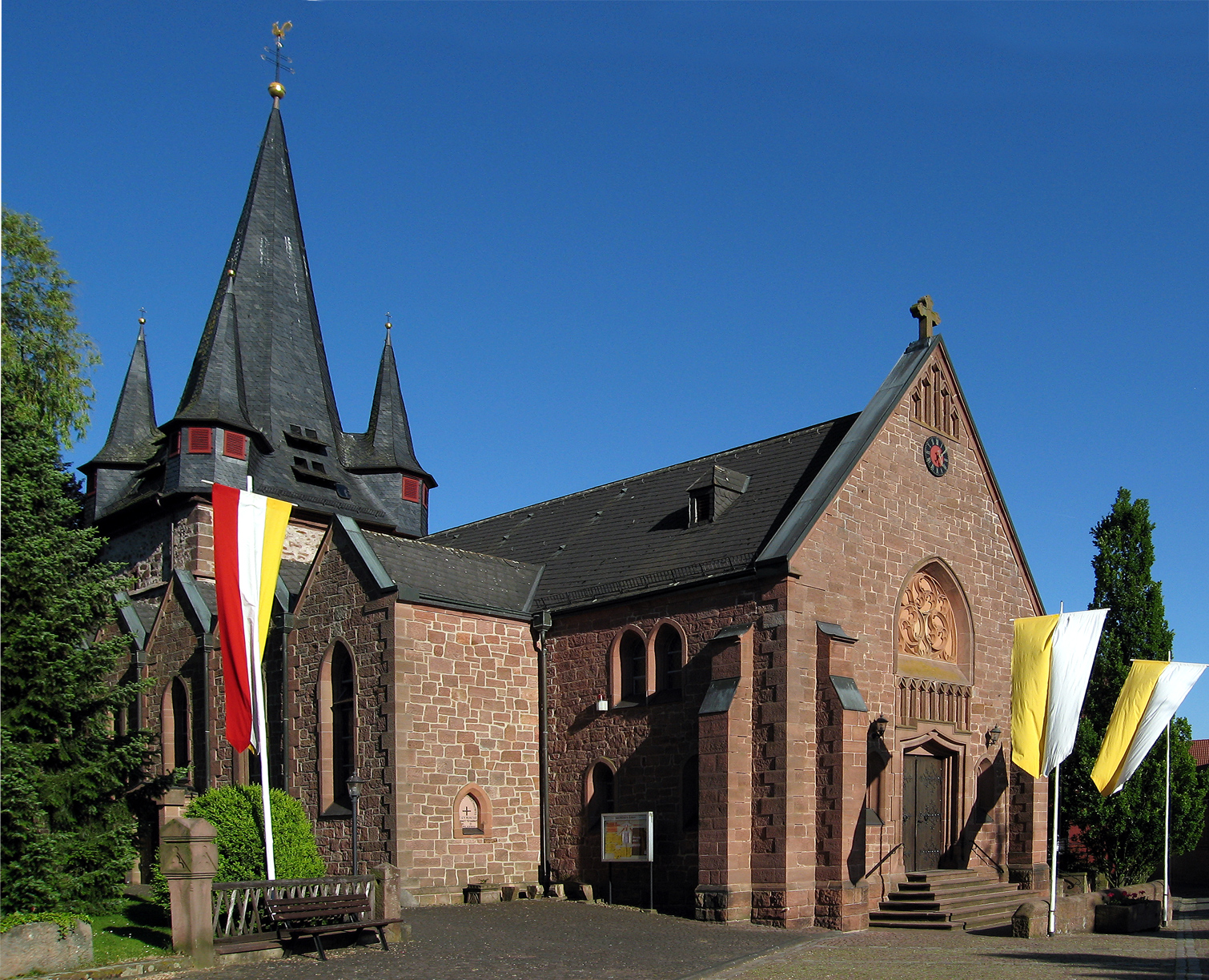
Bauerbach church

Bauerbach (German pronunciation: [ˈbaʊɐbax]) is a borough (Ortsbezirk) of Marburg in Hesse.
