= Cyriaxweimar =

- Borough of Marburg
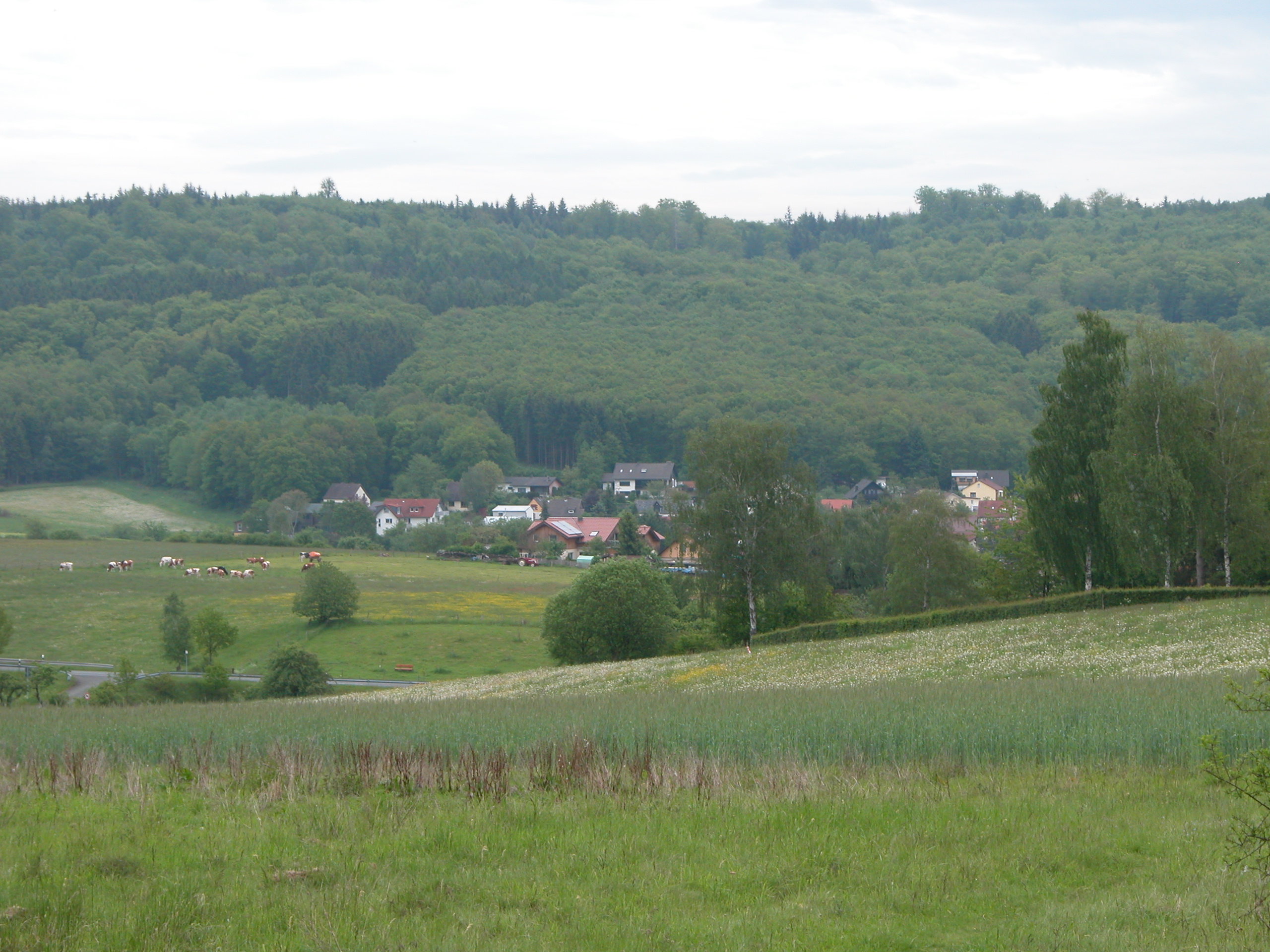

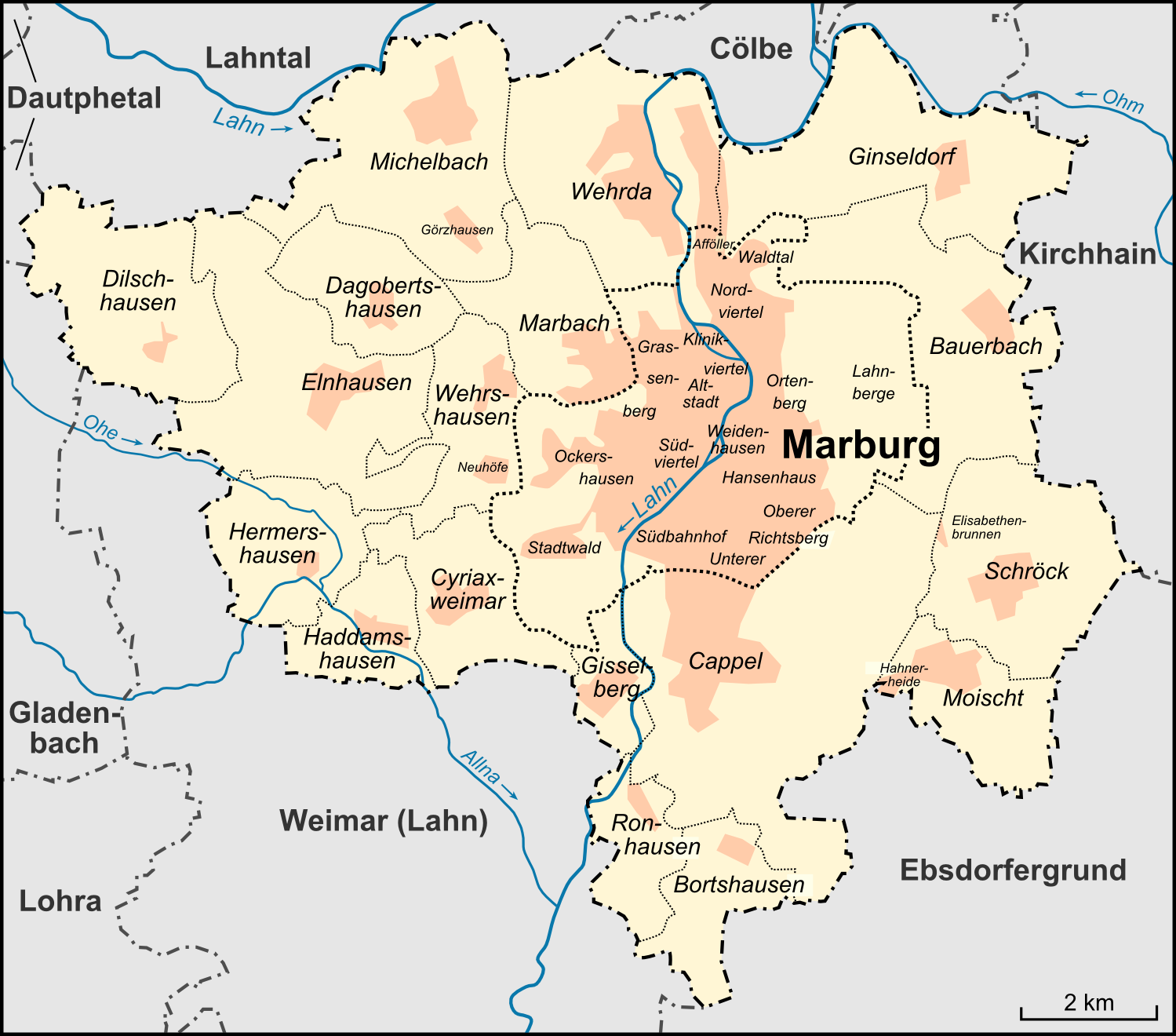
- Stadtteile of Marburg
- Interactive map of Cyriaxweimar
- Location within Germany Location within Hesse
- Coordinates: 50°47′N 8°43′E
- Country: Germany
- State: Hesse
- District: Marburg-Biedenkopf
- Town: Marburg

Area
  - Total: 3.97 km^{2} (1.53 sq mi)
- Elevation: 207–229 m (679–751 ft)

Population (2019-12-31)
  - Total: 544
  - Density: 137/km^{2} (355/sq mi)
- Time zone: UTC+01:00 (CET)
  - Summer (DST): UTC+02:00 (CEST)
- Postal codes: 35043
- Dialling codes: 06421

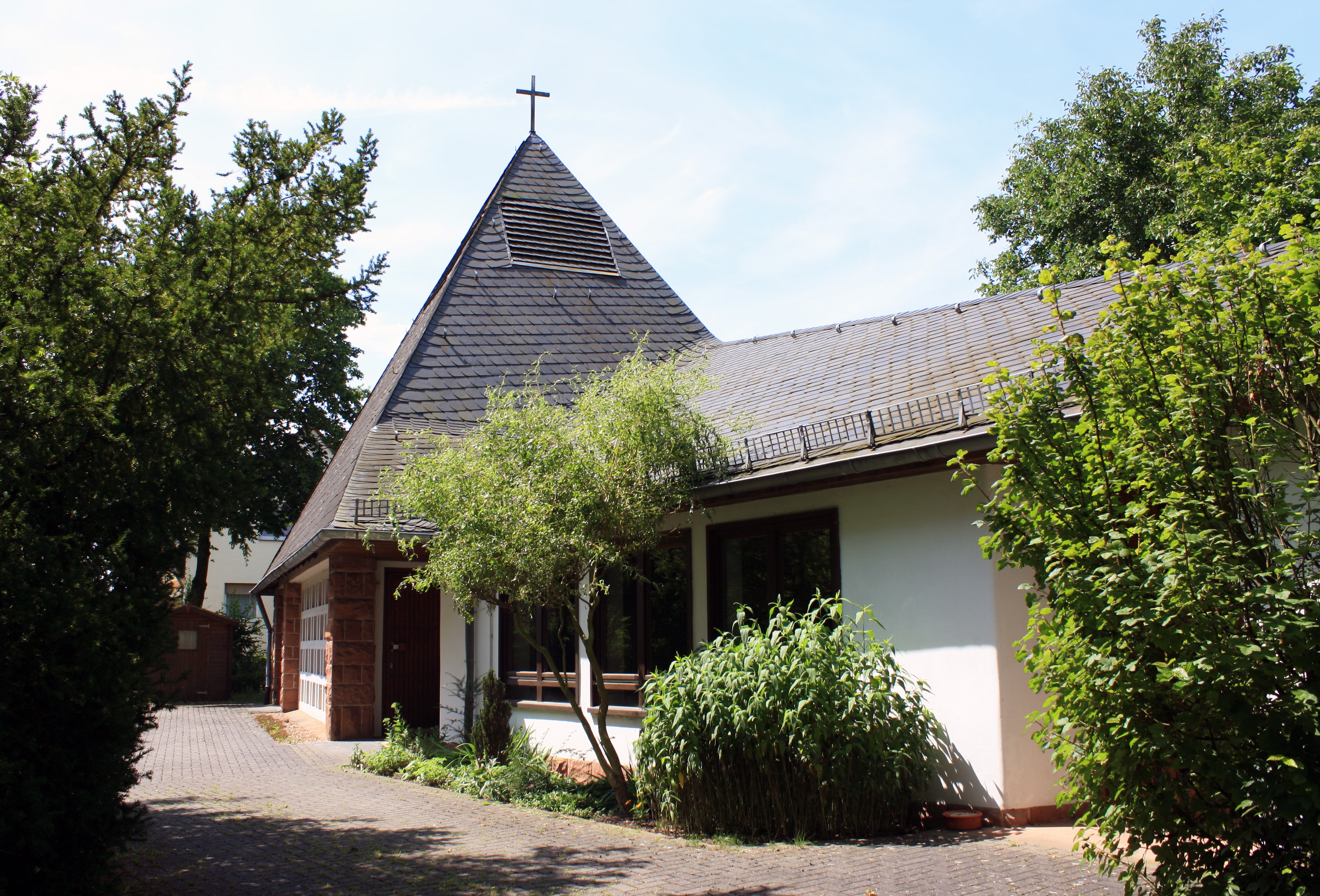
Cyriaxweimar church

Cyriaxweimar (German pronunciation: [ˌtsyːʁi̯aksˈvaɪmaʁ]) is a borough (Ortsbezirk) of Marburg in Hesse.
