= Haddamshausen =

- Borough of Marburg
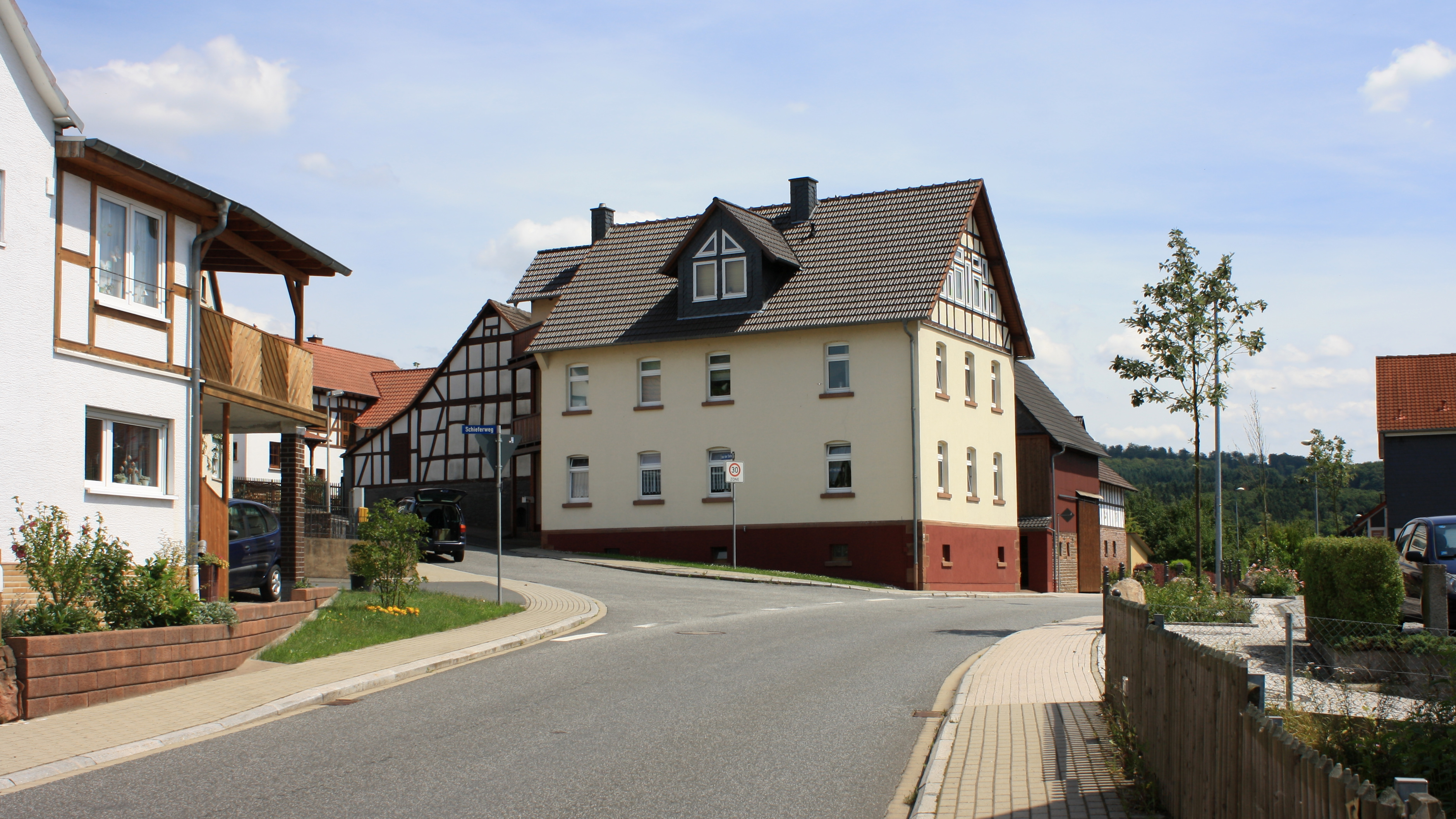
- Haddamshausen

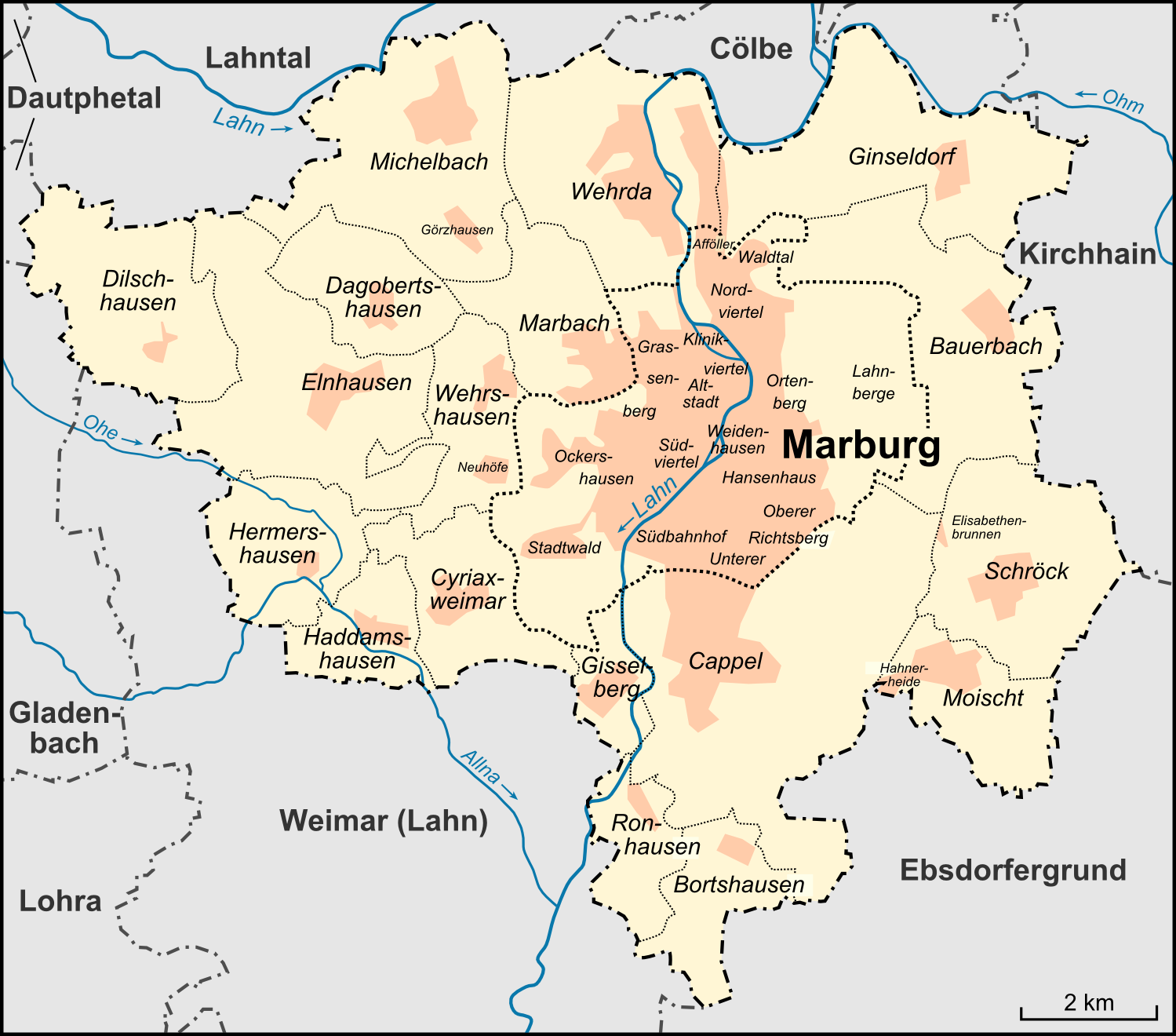
- Stadtteile of Marburg
- Interactive map of Haddamshausen
- Location within Germany Location within Hesse
- Coordinates: 50°46′48″N 8°41′57″E
- Country: Germany
- State: Hesse
- District: Marburg-Biedenkopf
- City: Marburg

Area
  - Total: 2.76 km^{2} (1.07 sq mi)
- Elevation: 187–212 m (614–696 ft)

Population (2019-12-31)
  - Total: 500
  - Density: 180/km^{2} (470/sq mi)
- Time zone: UTC+01:00 (CET)
  - Summer (DST): UTC+02:00 (CEST)
- Postal codes: 35041
- Dialling codes: 06421

Haddamshausen is a borough (Ortsbezirk) of Marburg in Hesse.
