= Bombing of Marburg =

Military actions during WWII

Bombing of Marburg during World War II
- Part of Strategic bombing during World War II
Date	1940, 1941, 1944 - 1945
Location	Marburg
Result	4% of the city destroyed, 142 deaths

Belligerents
United States	Germany

Strength
13 bombing raids	

The bombing of Marburg was a series of 13 Allied aerial bombing attacks on the city of Marburg, Germany, during World War II. A total of thirteen air raids were carried out, mainly by the United States Army Air Forces, in 1940 and between 1944 and 1945 as part of the Allied campaign of strategic bombing of Germany. However, unlike nearby Giessen, Siegen and Frankfurt, the city itself escaped major damage.

== Background ==
While Marburg was not designated as a city to be spared because of a particular reason by the Allies, it was also not seen as a target of opportunity. Marburg lacked any important industrial sites and from 1942 to 1945, the entire city turned into a hospital and was designated as a hospital city, with schools and government buildings turning into wards to augment the existing hospitals. By the spring of 1945, there were over 20,000 patients – mostly wounded German soldiers. As early as 1938, the sirens were howling several times in Marburg to practice air raid alarms in case of a war breaking out.

== Attacks ==
The first air attack on Marburg happened on 12 August 1940. An Allied plane dropped one bomb over the city, hitting the Universitätsstraße and causing only minor damage. The damage of the bomb was removed and the tram rails was quickly repaired.

After the first attack, the citizens of Marburg were unimpressed. Furthermore, there was also concern about the air alarms by NSDAP mayor Walter Voß. The trial alarms that were carried out time again and again were not taken as seriously as Voss presented. Because of this, he wrote on the 3 December 1940 to the chief president in Kassel in a requested report on the situation regarding the air raid alarms: "The discipline in probative alarms has dropped noticeably in the city". One year later, little had changed. There were shortage stocks and while there were 4 large alarm sirens throughout the city, a whopping 90% of the population did not visit the air raid shelter in the event of an air raid alarm going off.

A second Allied bombing took place on Marburg on 10 September 1941 - the first real attack on the city. Several houses and an inn on the Wehrdaer Weg were struck and several civilians were killed as a result. The air raid was dubbed an "act of terrorism" by the enemies according to the Nazis. While the city was already preparing for sheltering as early as 1933, it was only after 1941 where the local Nazi party leadership decided to enact a number of measures to accommodate places for the local population to hide in case of an Allied bombing. Most of these were carried out in secret and were forbidden to be published by the press. The main goal was to set up gas protection cellars and when public shelters were created, the local administration also used cellars of local breweries which had already been dug into the rocks of the hills of Marburg a long time ago.

Especially after October 1943, inhabitants of nearby Kassel who had lost their homes during the Allied bombing raids were housed in Marburg, many of whom were housed by local farmers.

After almost 3 years of no bombs falling on the city, the USAAF attacked Marburg on 22 February 1944 despite the city being classified as a hospital city. In the morning, the air raid sirens were blasting already all throughout the city. It was foreshadowing - between 14:30 and 15:00, 24 tons of explosive bombs were dropped on the station and south side of Marburg. The train station and its tracks, wagons, locomotives and part of the station roof, houses and properties like the Elisabethmühle on the Wehrdaer Weg, hotels and three departments of the university hospital - the medical, surgical and eye clinic - sustained heavy damage or were destroyed. The women's building and operating room were destroyed and the railway rails of the station were aimed vertically to the sky. The attack on the university hospital in the northern part of the city killed about 100 people and a list published by the Marburg building authority from the same year estimated that the total damage to the private buildings was about 1.5 million Reichsmark. Among the dead was a group of 17 soldiers who had recently started their study and were trained to become field doctors in Marburg. After the air raid, more and more citizens made use of the public shelters, which were believed to be safer compared to their primitive cellars in their basements. The second bombing raid of that year occurred on 12 December.

In February and March 1945, a rapid succession of Allied aerial attacks struck Marburg. On 22 February, a bombing raid by the American Ninth Air Force damaged 13 houses and severely damaged the railroad marshalling yards of the city. A second air raid on 5 March was more destructive, with 234 houses ending up damaged, the train station being completely destroyed and 9 people dying in the attack. Another two air attacks were carried out on 9 and 10 March, with the most destructive air raid occurring on 12 March: 24 houses were completely destroyed, 317 houses were damaged as well as 22 businesses. Another bombing raid happened on 19 March and destroyed 1 home, with another 108 damaged. A clothing office was also hit. On 20 and 22 March, another two air raids followed, with the last bombing raid only occurring on 23 March by the 100th Bombardment Group (Heavy). During this attack, the marshalling yards at Marburg were only a third priority target. During the attacks one of the bombs hit the main bunker with the name 'Europäer' or 'European'. The main exit from the large bunker was blocked by fire from hit buildings, forcing the people hiding in the bunker to use the emergency exits to Am Weinberg or the Wehrdaer Weg which were constructed one year earlier thanks to an exemption for the nationwide building ban that was in place at the time. The majority of the people inside had to wait several hours for the fire department to extinguish the fire and free up the main exit.

On 28 March 1945 at around 11:00 the, Major General Maurice Rose of the 1st U.S. Army reached the city, the provisional mayor surrendered Marburg without a fight, sparing it from further destruction. The city was occupied by the Combat Command B of the 1st U.S. Army.

== After the war ==
In the years following the conclusion of the war, unexploded bombs that fell on the city were occasionally found. In August 2016, a 50 kg bomb was discovered during investigations in the forest on the mountains of the Lahn in Marburg. Because the bomb lay under a tree in the ground, the detonator could not be reached and removed. A residential area had to be evacuated within a radius of around 500 meters. Ultimately, it was defused by a bomb squad. A dud had been defused in Marburg only one month before.

== Destruction ==
After the war ended, reconstruction began in the area's that were hit. Houses and apartments that were damaged were restored or torn down and the destroyed buildings were cleared and rebuilt in the typical Traditionalist style of the 1950s. A total of 87 out of 2879 houses in Marburg were completely destroyed, with another 76 being classified as uninhabitable. In total, 4% of the city ended up being destroyed. The damage of the war affected approximately 500 houses, which was 10% of the city's total living space. About 15% of all the university buildings in Marburg were destroyed, with specifically the north side of the city being heavily hit.

The air raids on Marburg cost the lives of a total of 101 civilians and 41 soldiers, with another 207 civilians and 70 soldiers ending up injured.

== See also ==
- Strategic bombing during World War II
- Frankfurt
