= Stefan Gradmann =

German librarian

Stefan Gradmann (born 1958 in Marburg) is a professor at KU Leuven and former manager of the University Library.

He studied philosophy and literature in Paris and Freiburg. He completed his PhD in 1986 and postgraduate studies in Cologne. He then worked as a research librarian at the State and University Library of Hamburg.

== Career ==
From 1992 to 1996, he was director of the North German Library Network. Together with Reiner Diedrichs, director of the Common Library Network (GBV). From 1997 to 2000, he worked for the Dutch company OCLC PICA for library software.

In 2000, he became deputy director of the Regional Data Center at the University of Hamburg where he led the group VCB. He was head of the German Academic Publishers Project (CAP). He was president of the German Society for Information Science and Practice from 2008 to 2014.

In 2008, he was appointed professor at the Institute of Library and Information Science at the Humboldt University of Berlin. In March 2013, he joined the faculty of KU Leuven.

== Selected works ==
- Gradmann, Stefan (1990). Topographie/Text: zur Funktion räumlicher Modellbildung in den Werken von Adalbert Stifter und Franz Kafka [Topography/Text: on the function of spatial modeling in the works of Adalbert Stifter and Franz Kafka]. Frankfurt am Main: Hain. ISBN 3-445-08946-9.
- "Cataloguing vs. Metadata: old wine in new bottles?" (PDF). IFLA Journal. 28 (4): 88–90. 1999. ISSN 0340-0352. https://lirias.kuleuven.be/1694644.
- Gradmann, Stefan (19 April 2005). "rdfs:frbr–Towards an Implementation Model for Library Catalogs Using Semantic Web Technology". Cataloging & Classification Quarterly. 39 (3–4): 63–75. doi:10.1300/J104v39n03_05. Full access available to users of The Wikipedia Library.
- Gradmann, Stefan; Umlauf, Konrad (eds.). Lexikon der Bibliotheks- und Informationswissenschaft. Stuttgart: Hiersemann. Volume 1 (A–J) ISBN 978-3-7772-1123-7 (2011); Volume 2 (K–Z) ISBN 978-3-7772-1418-4 (2014)
