= Stadtbezirk =

Administrative unit of German cities

A Stadtbezirk (German pronunciation: [ˈʃtatbəˌtsɪʁk]; also called Ortsbezirk in Hesse and Rhineland-Palatinate) is an administrative division in Germany, which is part of a larger city. It is translated as "borough". In Germany, Stadtbezirke usually only exist in a metropolis with more than 150,000 inhabitants. For example, Wattenscheid, which was a town in its own right until 1974, is now a Stadtbezirk within the city of Bochum in the Ruhr area of North Rhine-Westphalia. In Hesse and Rhineland-Palatinate, the term Ortsbezirk is also used for districts of smaller cities.

A Stadtbezirk may consist of several smaller parts: Stadtteile or Ortsteile. While in some cities Stadtbezirke are only used for statistical purposes, many other Stadtbezirke have elected representatives. The tasks and responsibilities of the Stadtbezirke are laid down in the municipal codes (Gemeindeordnungen) of the federal states. The details, compositions etc. of the Stadtbezirke and their representatives are laid down in the municipal by-law (Hauptsatzung) of the city.
