= Asphe =

River in Germany

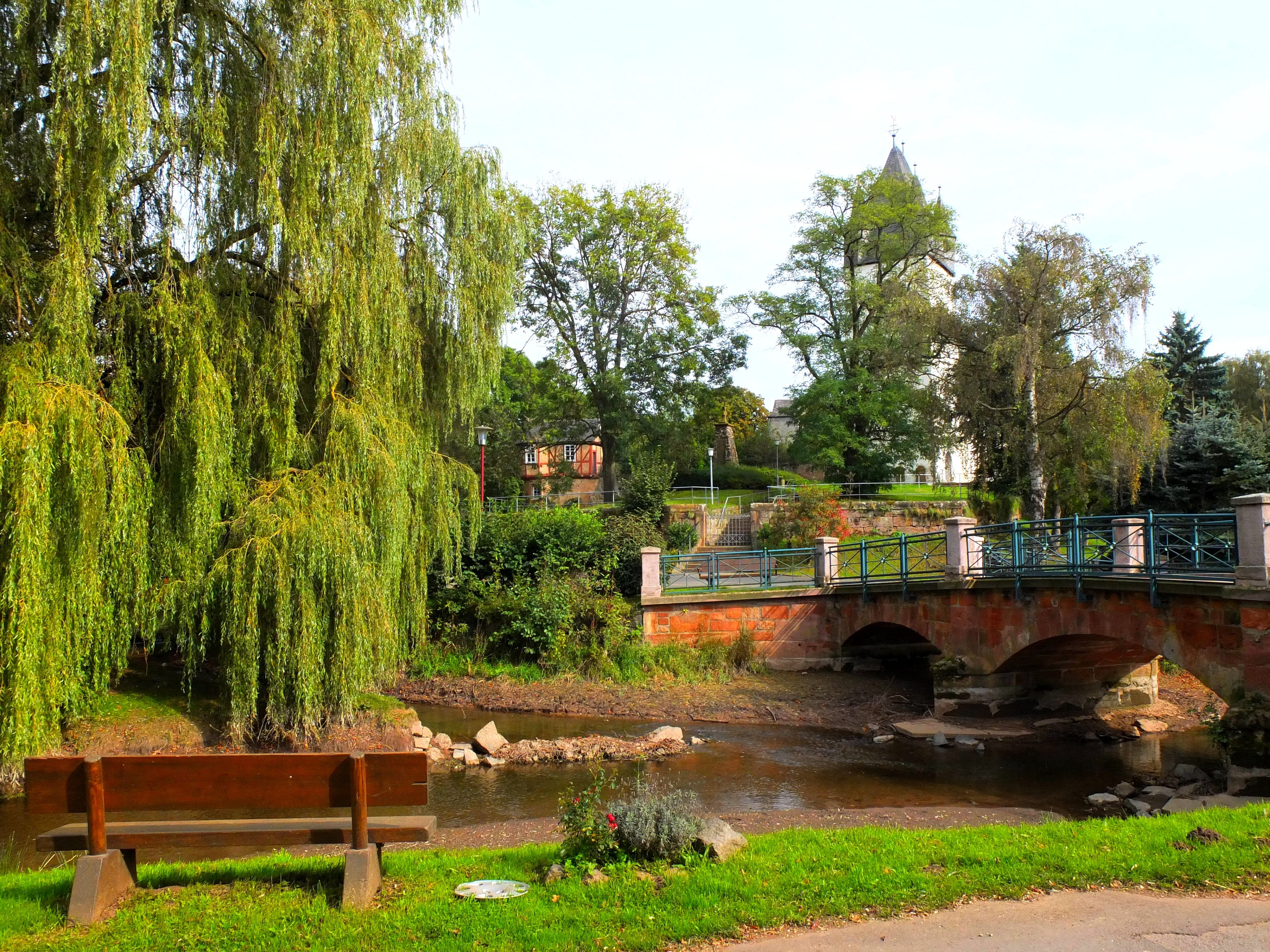

- Location of mouth in Hesse

Location
- Country: Germany
- State: Hesse

Physical characteristics
- Mouth
  - location: Treisbach
  - coordinates: 50.9095°N 8.6863°E
- Length: 10.5 km (6.5 mi)

Basin features
- Progression: Treisbach→ Wetschaft→ Lahn→ Rhine→ North Sea

The Asphe (also Asphebach) is a river of Hesse, Germany. The 10.5 km long Asphe flows into the Treisbach near Wetter as a left tributary.

== See also ==
- List of rivers of Hesse
