= Vers (Lahn) =

River in Germany

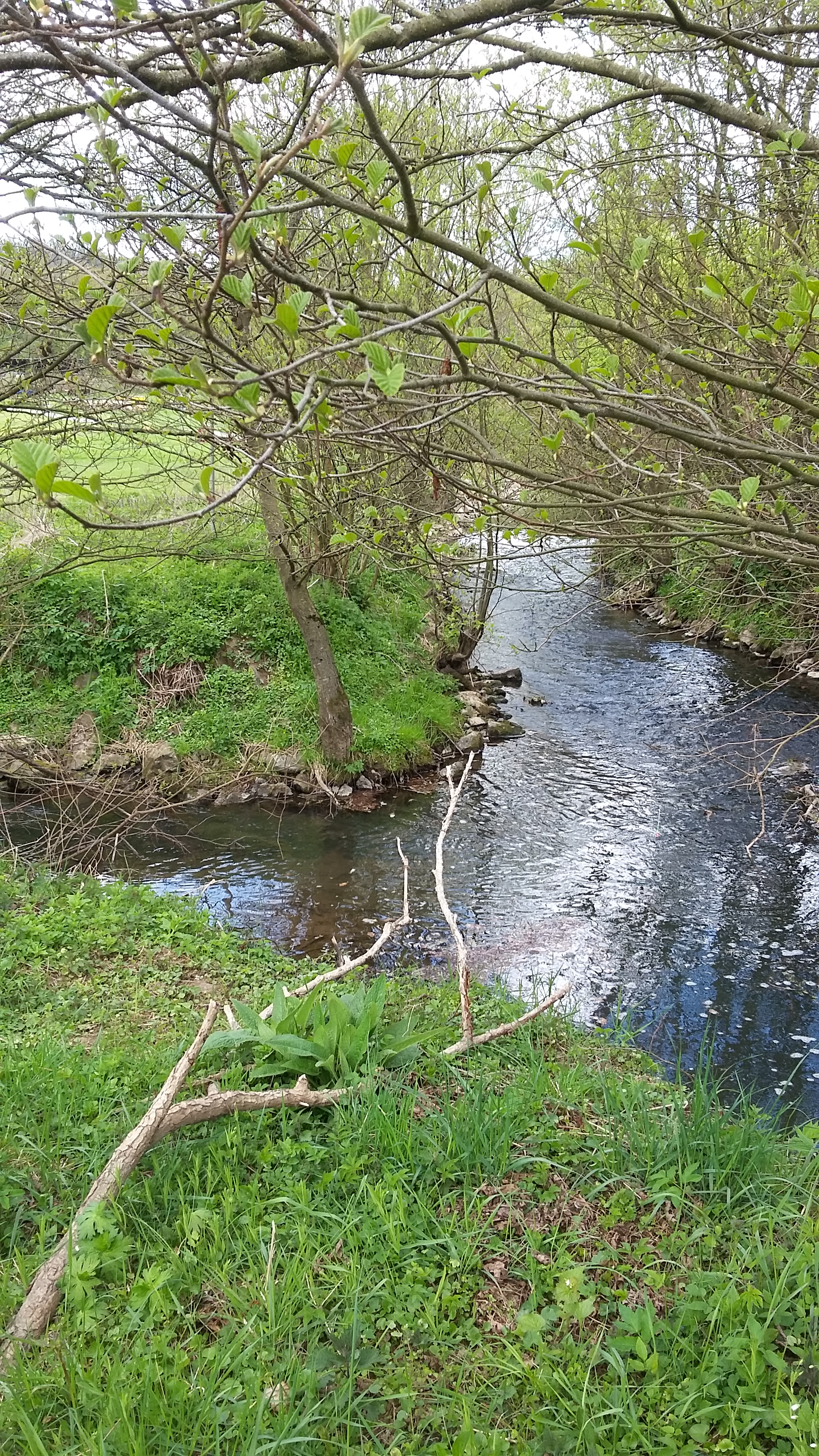

Location
- Country: Germany
- State: Hesse

Physical characteristics
- Mouth
  - location: Salzböde
  - coordinates: 50°42′14″N 8°38′50″E

Basin features
- Progression: Salzböde→ Lahn→ Rhine→ North Sea

Vers is a river of Hesse, Germany. It is a right tributary of the river Salzböde, which it joins near Lohra.

== See also ==
- List of rivers of Hesse
