= SV Eintracht Lollar =

German football club

- Full name: Sportverein Eintracht 1920 Lollar e.V.
- Founded: 1920
- Ground: Waldsportplatz
- Capacity: 6,000
- Chairman: Rüdiger Schwalm
- Trainer: Peter Sichmann
- League: Inactive

SV Eintracht Lollar is a German football club based in Lollar, Hesse, currently playing in the Gruppenliga Gießen/Marburg (VII). The club, with 550 active members, also has departments for women's football, gymnastics and Nordic walking.

== History ==
SV Eintracht Lollar were established in 1920 and their football team twice earned promotion to the sixth tier Verbandsliga Hessen-Mitte, in 2007 and 2010 but was, on both occasions, relegated straight away again. The club achieved another promotion to the Verbandsliga in 2012 but was immediately relegated again.

== Stadium ==
SV Eintracht Lollar plays its home fixtures at the 6,000 capacity Waldsportplatz.
