= Engelbach =

Engelbach may refer to:

- Archibald Engelbach, former English badminton player
- Florence Engelbach (1872-1951), English painter
- Reginald Engelbach (1888–1946), English Egyptologist and engineer
- Engelbach (Bavaria), a river of Bavaria, Germany
- Engelbach (Hesse), a river of Hesse, Germany
- Engelbach (Treisbach), the upper course of the Treisbach, a river of Hesse, Germany
- Engelbach, a division of the town Biedenkopf in Hesse, Germany

== See also ==
- Pischelsdorf am Engelbach, a municipality in Austria
