= Lumda =

Lumda may refer to:

- Lumda (Grünberg), a district of the town Grünberg, Hesse, Germany
- Lumda (river), a river in Hesse, Germany, tributary of the Lahn
