= Allendorf, Giessen =

Allendorf
- Town
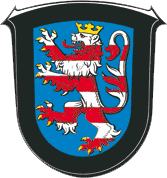
- Coat of arms

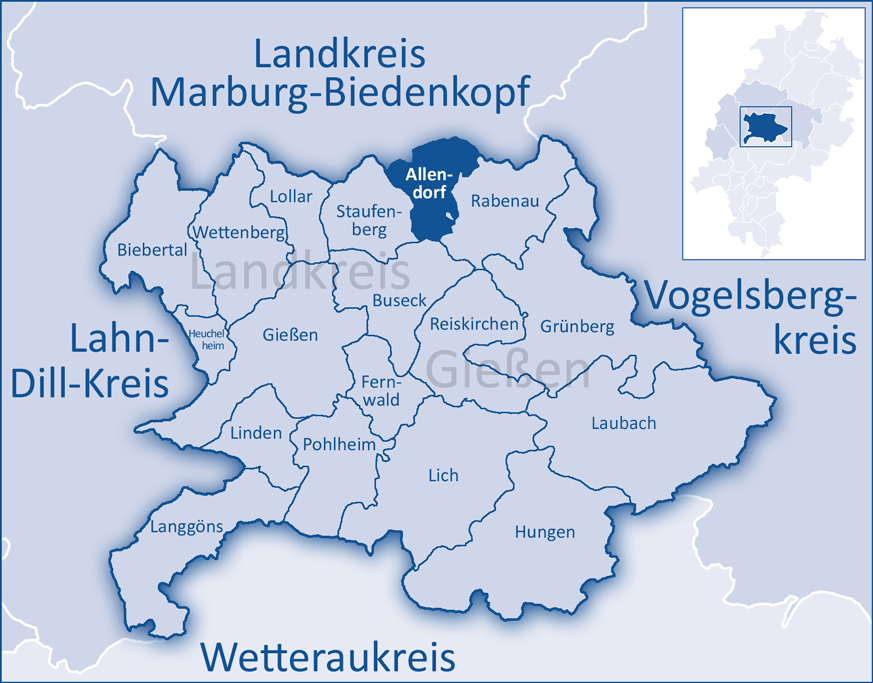
- Location of Allendorf within Giessen district
- Interactive map of Allendorf
- Location within Germany Location within Hesse
- Coordinates: 50°40′44″N 08°49′28″E
- Country: Germany
- State: Hesse
- Admin. region: Giessen
- District: Giessen

Government
  - Mayor (2023–29): Sebastian Schwarz (SPD)

Area
  - Total: 22.05 km^{2} (8.51 sq mi)
- Elevation: 230 m (750 ft)

Population (2025-12-31)
  - Total: 3,838
  - Density: 174.1/km^{2} (450.8/sq mi)
- Time zone: UTC+01:00 (CET)
  - Summer (DST): UTC+02:00 (CEST)
- Postal codes: 35469
- Dialling codes: 06407
- Vehicle registration: GI
- Website: www.allendorf-lda.de

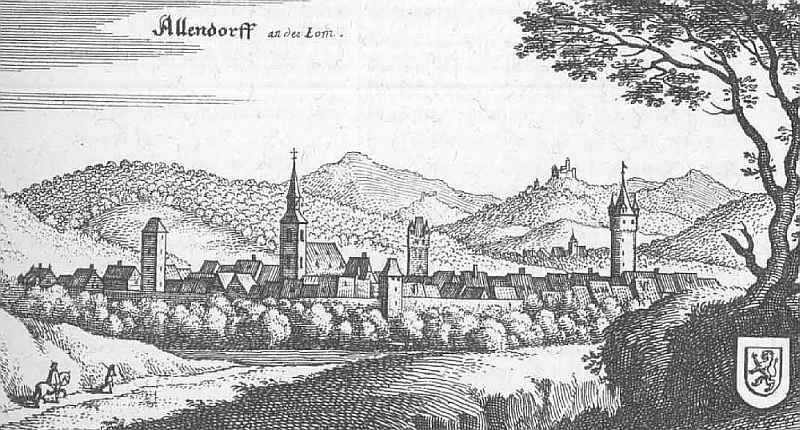
Drawing of Allendorf from Topographia Hassiae by Matthäus Merian, 1655.

Allendorf (German: [ˈaləndɔʁf], official name: Allendorf (Lumda)) is a small town in the district of Giessen, in Hesse, Germany. It is situated on the small river Lumda, 16 km (9.9 mi) south of Marburg, and 14 km (8.7 mi) northeast of Giessen.
