= Solmsbach =

River in Germany

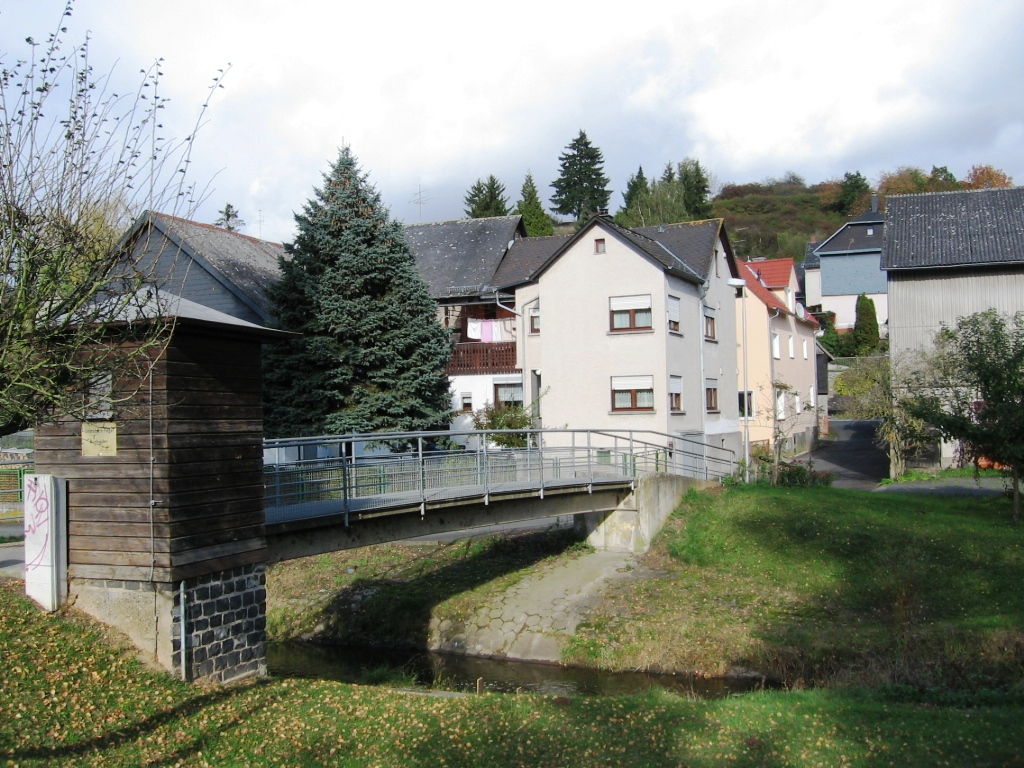

Location
- Country: Germany
- State: Hesse

Physical characteristics
- Mouth
  - location: Lahn
  - coordinates: 50.5509°N 8.4043°E
- Length: 24.6 km (15.3 mi)

Basin features
- Progression: Lahn→ Rhine→ North Sea

Solmsbach is a river of Hesse, Germany. It flows into the Lahn in Solms.

== See also ==
- List of rivers of Hesse
