= Lahntal =

- Municipality
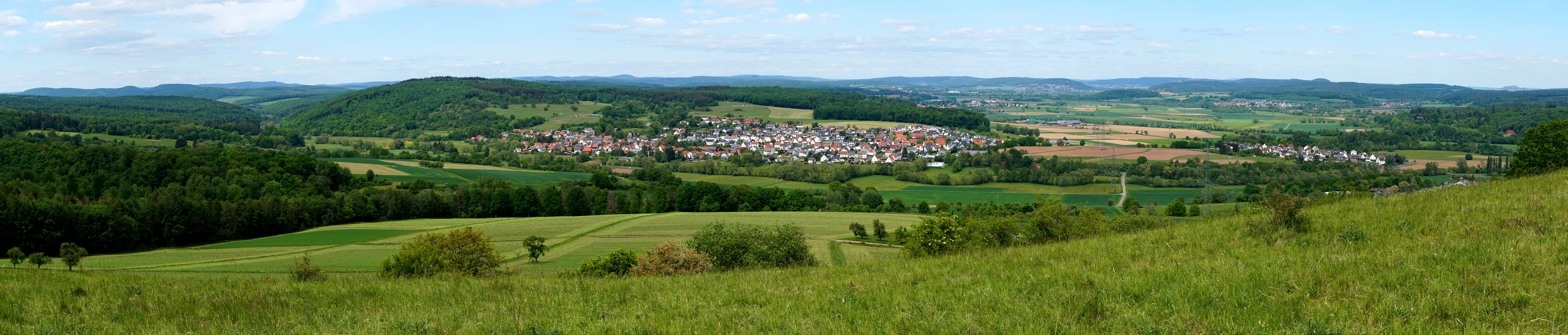

- Coat of arms

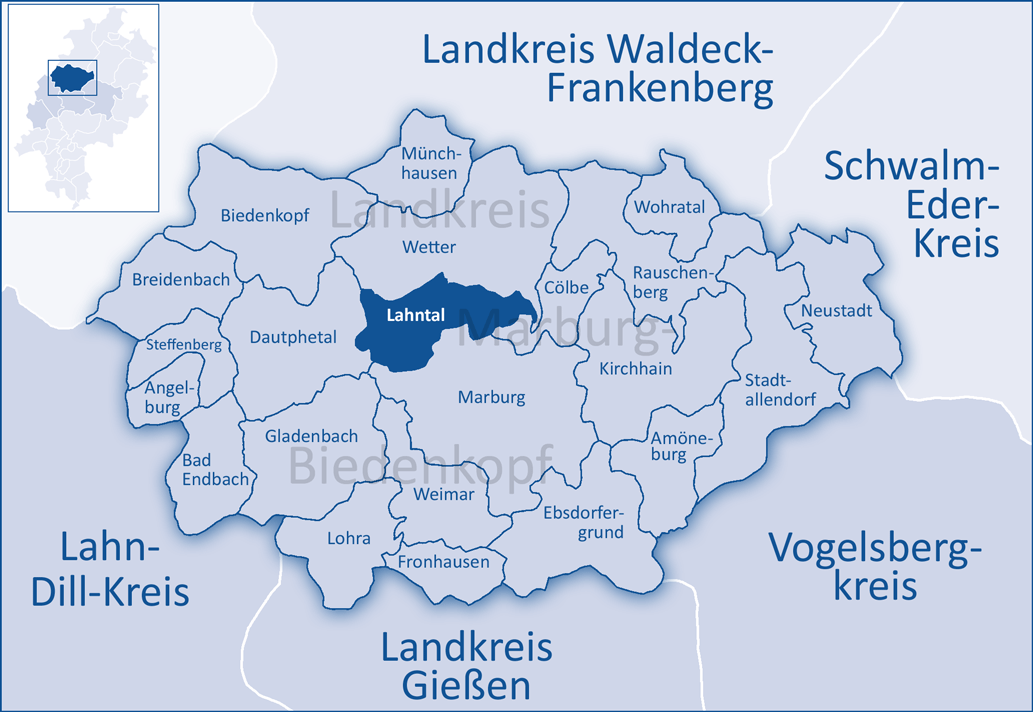
- Location of Lahntal within Marburg-Biedenkopf district
- Interactive map of Lahntal
- Location within Germany Location within Hesse
- Coordinates: 50°51′N 08°41′E
- Country: Germany
- State: Hesse
- Admin. region: Gießen
- District: Marburg-Biedenkopf
- Subdivisions: 7 Ortsteile

Government
  - Mayor (2022–28): Carsten Laukel

Area
  - Total: 40.5 km^{2} (15.6 sq mi)
- Elevation: 200–500 m (660–1,640 ft)

Population (2025-12-31)
  - Total: 6,988
  - Density: 173/km^{2} (447/sq mi)
- Time zone: UTC+01:00 (CET)
  - Summer (DST): UTC+02:00 (CEST)
- Postal codes: 35094
- Dialling codes: 06420 / 06423
- Vehicle registration: MR
- Website: www.lahntal.de

The municipality of Lahntal (German pronunciation: [ˈlaːntaːl], lit. 'Lahn Valley') is found in the Marburg-Biedenkopf district in northwest Middle Hesse, Germany.

== Geography ==
Lahntal lies on the upper Lahn about 83 km north of Frankfurt am Main and about 7 km northwest of Marburg. In the north, it borders on the town of Wetter, in the east on the municipality of Cölbe, in the south on Marburg, and in the west on the municipality of Dautphetal.

West of the municipality rises the 498 m-high Rimberg.

=== Constituent municipalities ===
- Brungershausen
- Caldern
- Göttingen
- Goßfelden
- Kernbach
- Sarnau
- Sterzhausen

== Population ==
As of December 31, 2022, Lahntal has a population of 7,102 of which 49.6% are male ad 50.4% are female. 91.5% of the total population are Germans (49.3% male and 50.7% female) and 8.5% are "not Germans" (52.4% male and 47.6% female)

Population of each village (as of 30 June 2022)

- Brungershausen: 91
- Caldern: 1.315
- Göttingen: 297
- Goßfelden: 2.360
- Kernbach: 218
- Sarnau: 997
- Sterzhausen: 2.339

== Politics ==
=== Municipal representation ===
(last municipal election: 14 March 2021)

| Parties and voter coalitions | | Share in % | Seats |
| CDU | Christian Democratic Union | 20.9 | 6 |
| SPD | Social Democratic Party of Germany | 34.9 | 11 |
| Greens | Alliance '90/The Greens | 18.2 | 6 |
| BLL | Citizens' List Lahntal | 26.0 | 8 |
| total | | 100 | 31 |

=== Coat of arms ===
Lahntal's civic coat of arms might be described thus: In gules an inescutcheon showing the shield of the Teutonic Knights (in argent a cross sable), laid over a fess wavy argent; behind the inescutcheon tilted dexter and turned sinister an abbess's staff Or with velum argent; spangled with seven trefoils, three above the fess and four below.

The coat of arms was adopted as part of the municipal reform in Hesse, and the wavy fess represents the municipality's namesake river. The clovers represent the seven constituent municipalities within Lahntal's bounds; moreover, the abbess's staff stands for Caldern, where there was once a convent, and the Teutonic Knights' shield stands for Goßfelden, which lies south of the river Lahn.

=== Municipal partnerships ===
- Stara Kiszewa, Poland
- Sussargues, France

Lahntal has been partnered since 6 April 1986 with the municipality of Sussargues, which lies in the department of Hérault in southern France, right near Montpellier (about 17 km) and the Mediterranean Sea. Lahntal and Sussargues lie about 1 050 km apart.

Between the Polish municipality of Stara Kiszewa and Lahntal, a municipality partnership was ceremoniously sealed in Poland on 10 January 2005. The underwriting of the intercommunal deal in Lahntal took place on 26 May 2006. Stara Kiszewa has about 6,200 inhabitants in some 20 centres, some quite small, and is in the powiat of Kościerzyna, about 80 km south of Gdańsk and 80 km west of Malbork in the tourist region of Kashubia.

== Culture and Sightseeing ==
=== Buildings ===
- Rimberg Tower near Caldern
- Defensive church tower in Sterzhausen from the 12th or 13th century.
- Old Lahn Bridge in Goßfelden
- Otto-Ubbelohde-Haus in Goßfelden

== Economy and infrastructure ==
=== Transport ===
Running west–east through the municipal area is the Federal Highway (Bundesstraße) B 62 coming from Biedenkopf and going on towards Cölbe and farther to Alsfeld. In Lahntal-Göttingen, the B 252 from Diemelstadt and Korbach to the north comes to an end.

The Obere Lahntalbahn, a single-track Deutsche Bahn unelectrified secondary railway line run by DB's Kurhessenbahn subsidiary, joins Marburg by way of Biedenkopf and Bad Laasphe with Erndtebrück. Stops on the line may be found at Sarnau (full station), Goßfelden, Sterzhausen and Caldern.

=== Tourism ===
The municipality of Lahntal belongs, along with parts of its environs to the Burgwald region, the Lahn tourism region and the Lahn-Dill Nature Park; it also lies on the Lahntal bicycle trail.

=== Established enterprises ===
- Lauf&Masche

== Personalities ==
=== Sons and daughters of the town ===
- Otto Ubbelohde, drawer and painter
- Christean Wagner, Hessian politician
- Dr. Richard Munz, awarded the Bundesverdienstkreuz on ribbon on 17 January 2003

=== Others associated with the municipality ===
- Brothers Grimm
