= Salzböde =

River in Germany

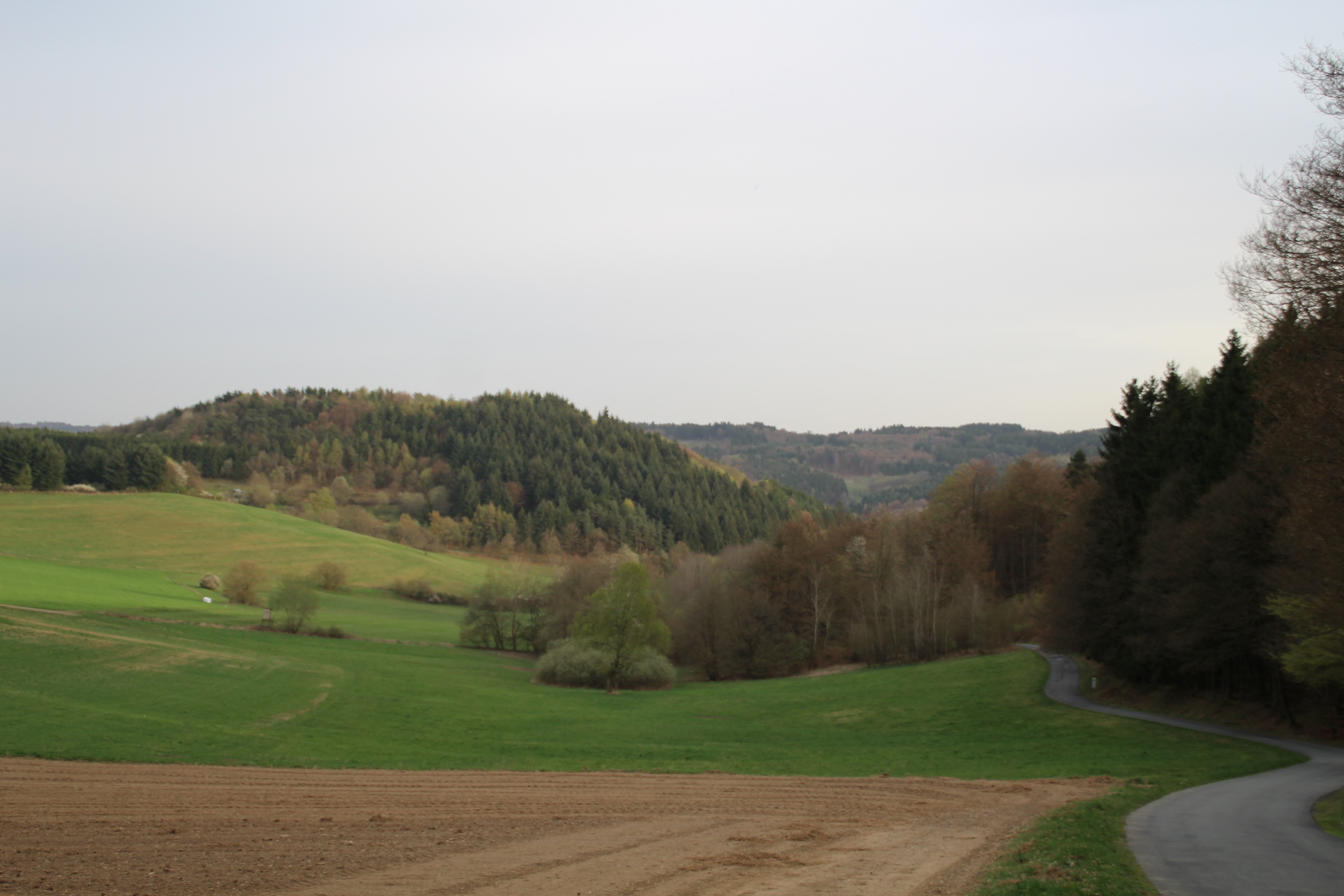
- River source

Location
- Country: Germany
- State: Hesse

Physical characteristics
- Mouth
  - location: Lahn
  - coordinates: 50°40′40″N 8°42′21″E
- Length: 27.5 km (17.1 mi)

Basin features
- Progression: Lahn→ Rhine→ North Sea

Salzböde is a river of Hesse, Germany. It is a right tributary of the river Lahn, which it joins near Lollar.

== See also ==
- List of rivers of Hesse
