= Treisbach (Wetschaft) =

River in Germany

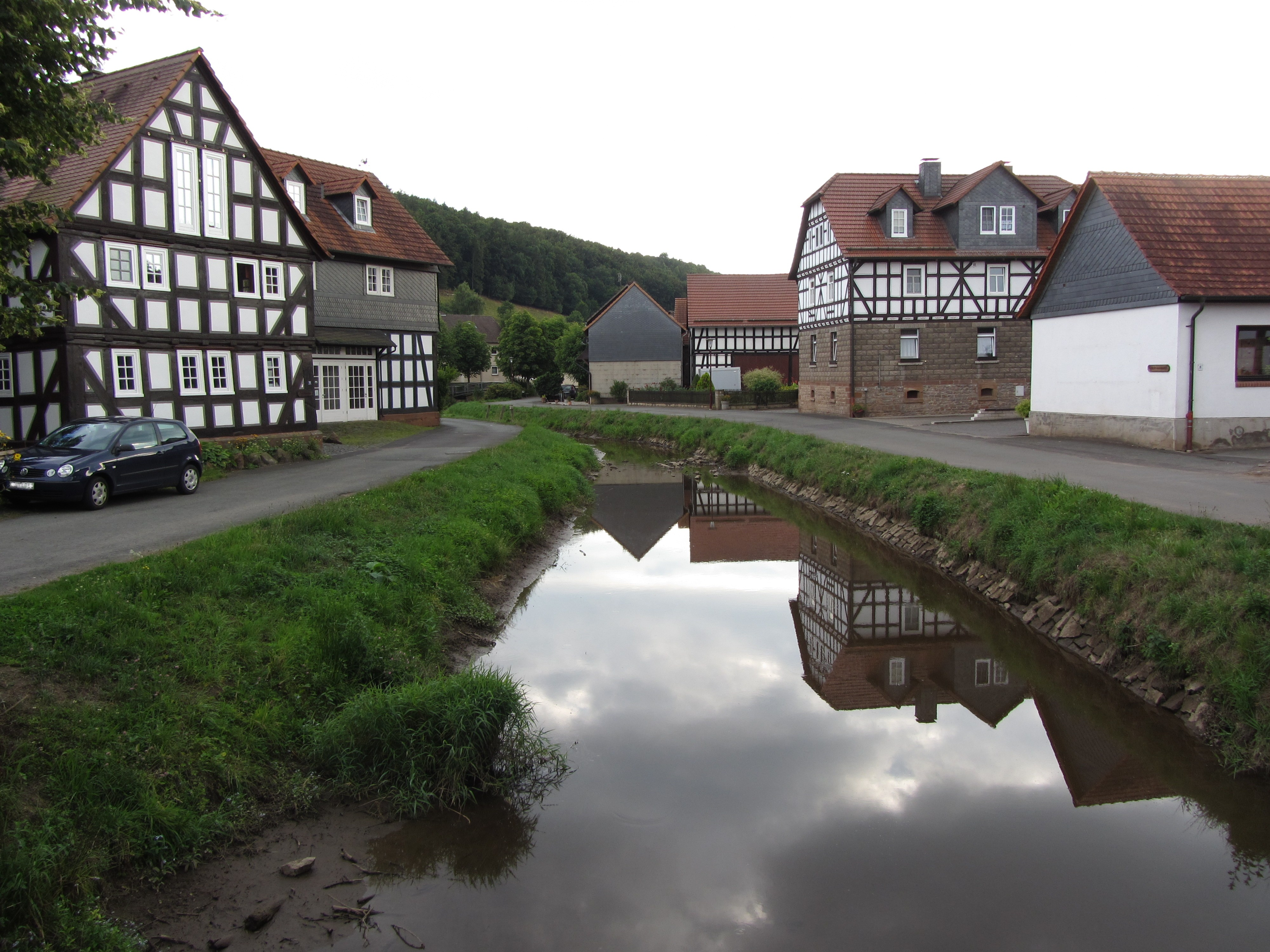

Location
- Country: Germany
- State: Hesse

Physical characteristics
- Mouth
  - location: Wetschaft
  - coordinates: 50.9127°N 8.7140°E
- Length: 17.2 km (10.7 mi)

Basin features
- Progression: Wetschaft→ Lahn→ Rhine→ North Sea

Treisbach (in its upper course: Engelbach) is a river of Hesse, Germany. It flows into the Wetschaft in Wetter.

== See also ==
- List of rivers of Hesse
