= Wetschaft =

River in Germany

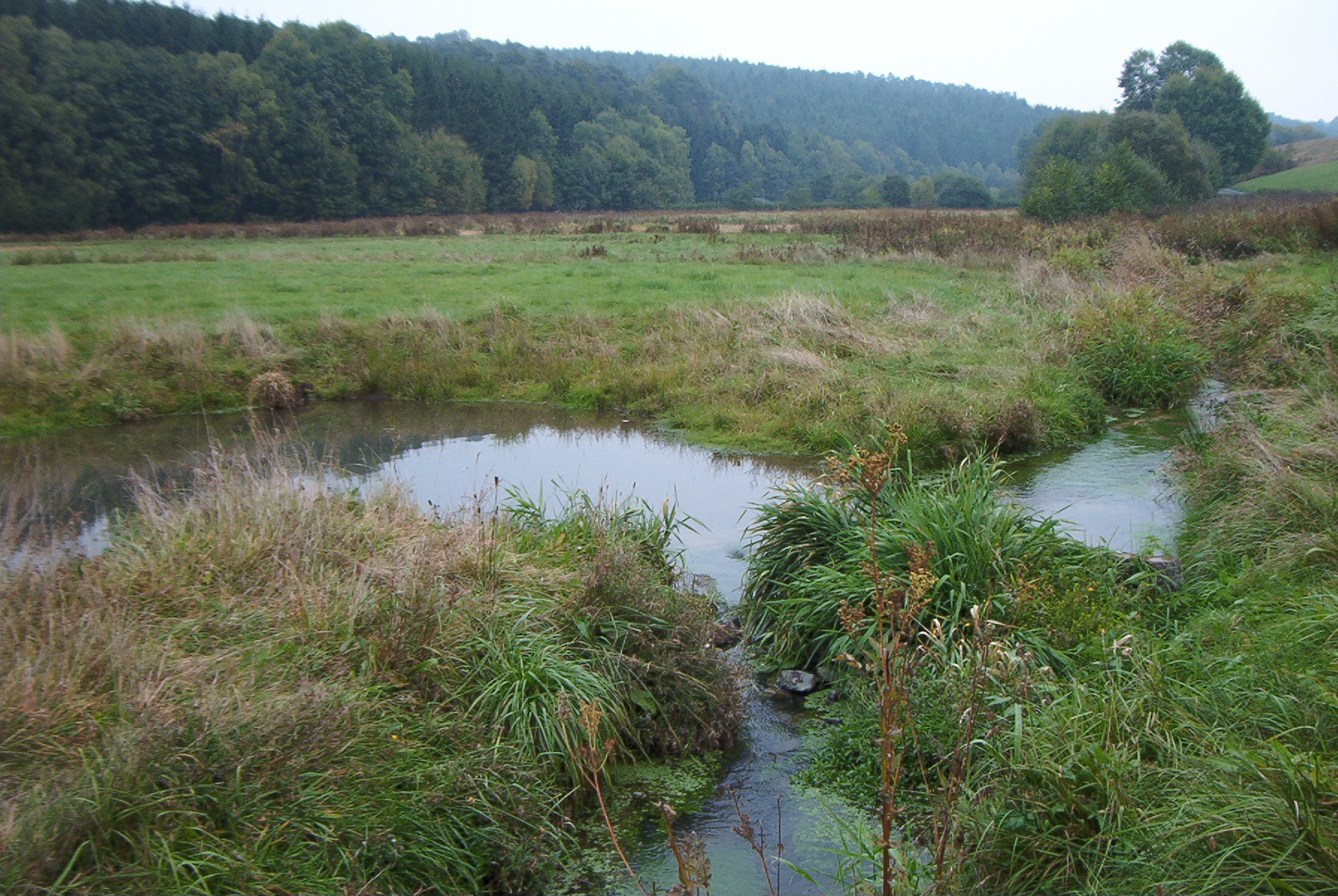

Location
- Country: Germany
- State: Hesse

Physical characteristics
- Mouth
  - location: Lahn
  - coordinates: 50.8688°N 8.7820°E
- Length: 27.3 km (17.0 mi)

Basin features
- Progression: Lahn→ Rhine→ North Sea

Wetschaft is a river of Hesse, Germany. It flows into the Lahn near Cölbe.

== See also ==
- List of rivers of Hesse
