= Vetzberg (volcano) =

Mountain in Germany

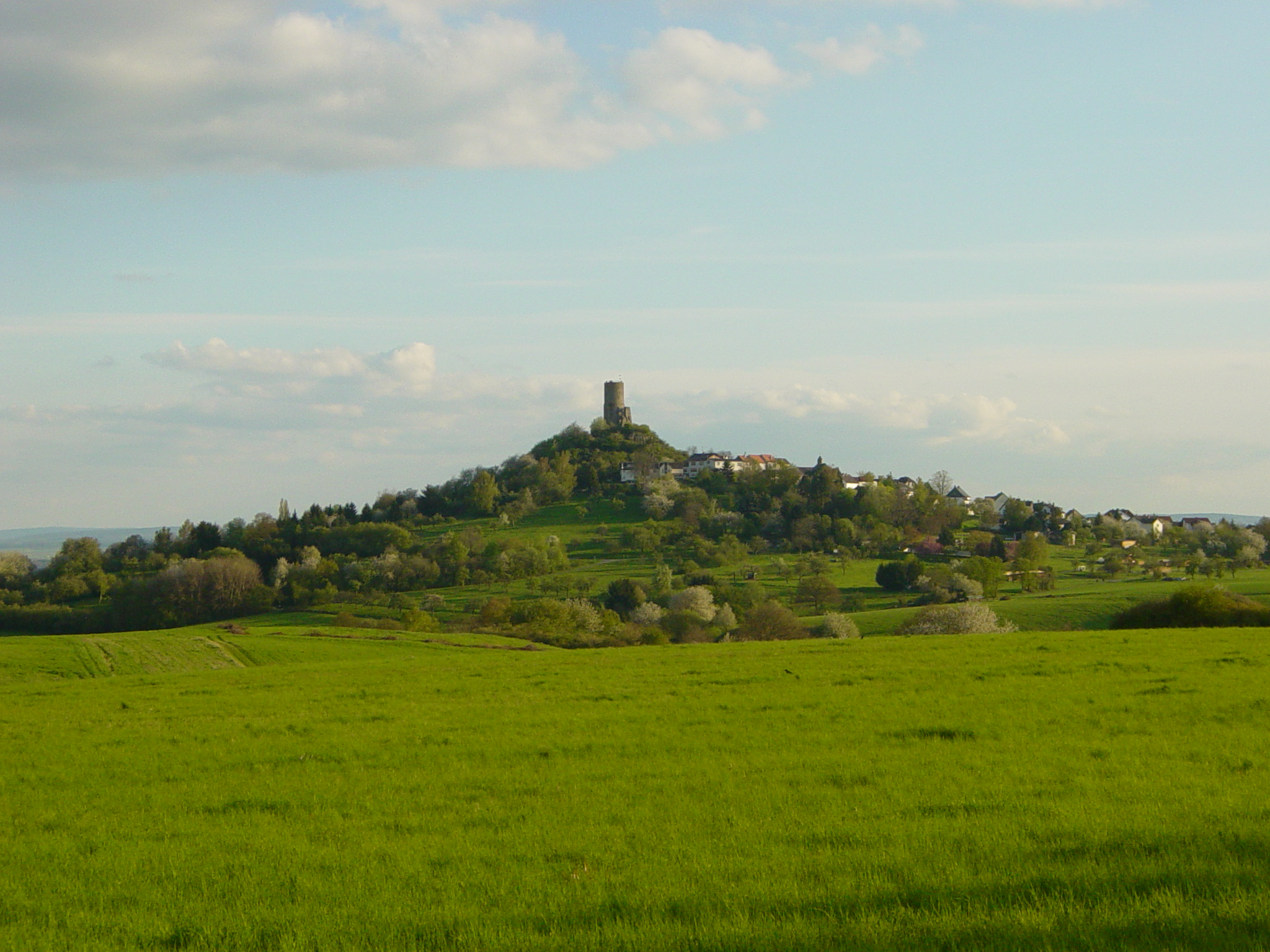
- Northern view of the Vetzberg

Highest point
- Elevation: 310 m (1,020 ft)
- Coordinates: 50°37′13″N 8°37′01″E

Geography
- Location: Hesse, Germany

Vetzberg is a hill and extinct volcano of Hesse, Germany.
