= Cölbe =

- Municipality
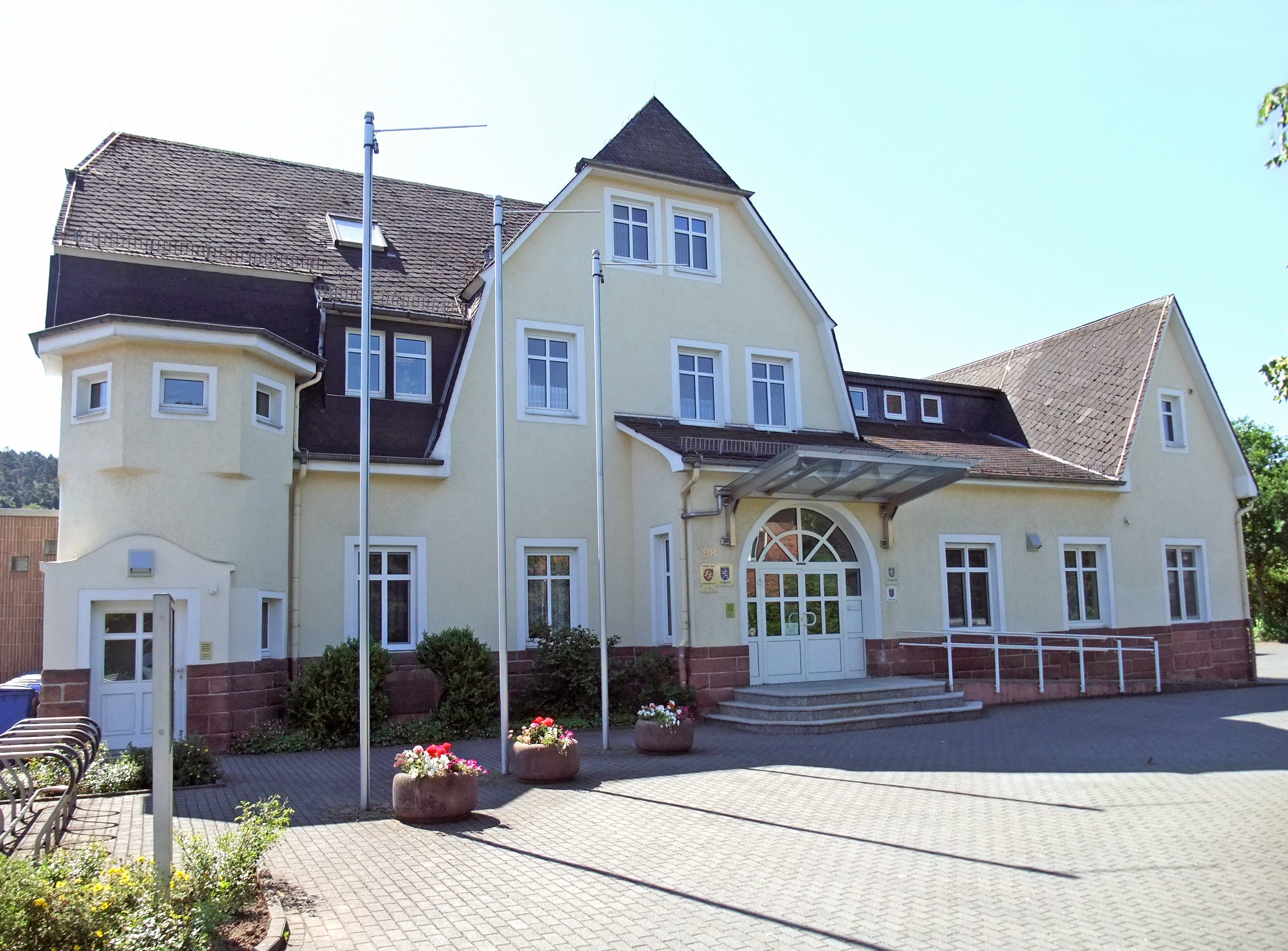
- The town hall (former railway station)

- Coat of arms

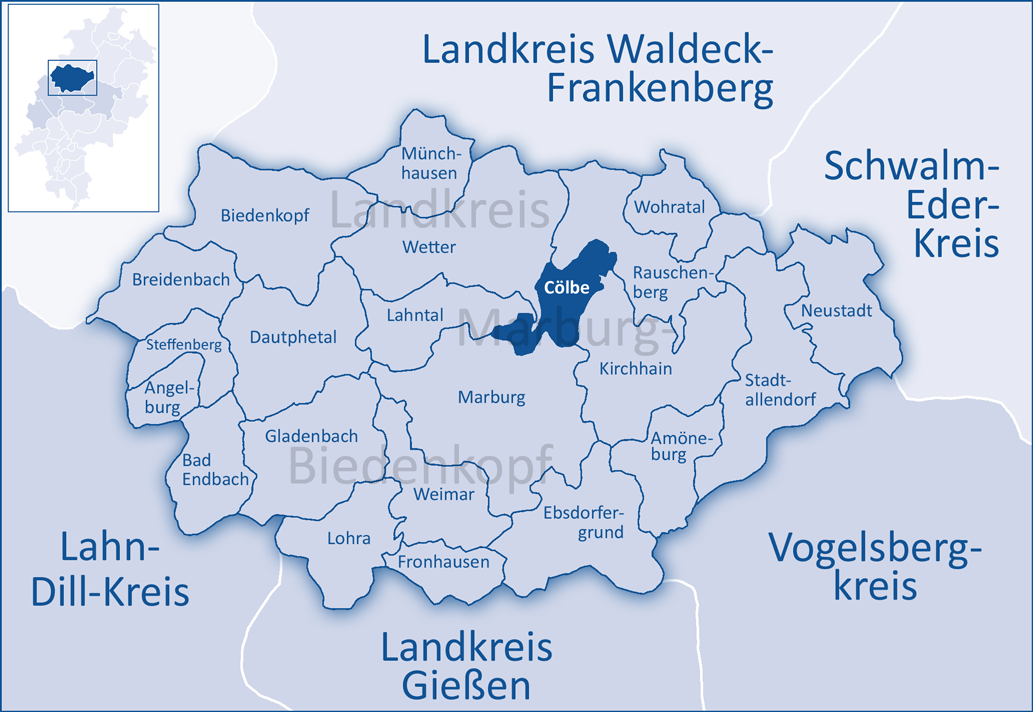
- Location of Cölbe within Marburg-Biedenkopf district
- Interactive map of Cölbe
- Location within Germany Location within Hesse
- Coordinates: 50°51′02″N 08°47′03″E
- Country: Germany
- State: Hesse
- Admin. region: Gießen
- District: Marburg-Biedenkopf

Government
  - Mayor (2018–24): Jens Ried (Ind.)

Area
  - Total: 26.68 km^{2} (10.30 sq mi)
- Elevation: 213 m (699 ft)

Population (2025-12-31)
  - Total: 6,566
  - Density: 246.1/km^{2} (637.4/sq mi)
- Time zone: UTC+01:00 (CET)
  - Summer (DST): UTC+02:00 (CEST)
- Postal codes: 35091
- Dialling codes: 06421/ 06427
- Vehicle registration: MR
- Website: www.coelbe.de

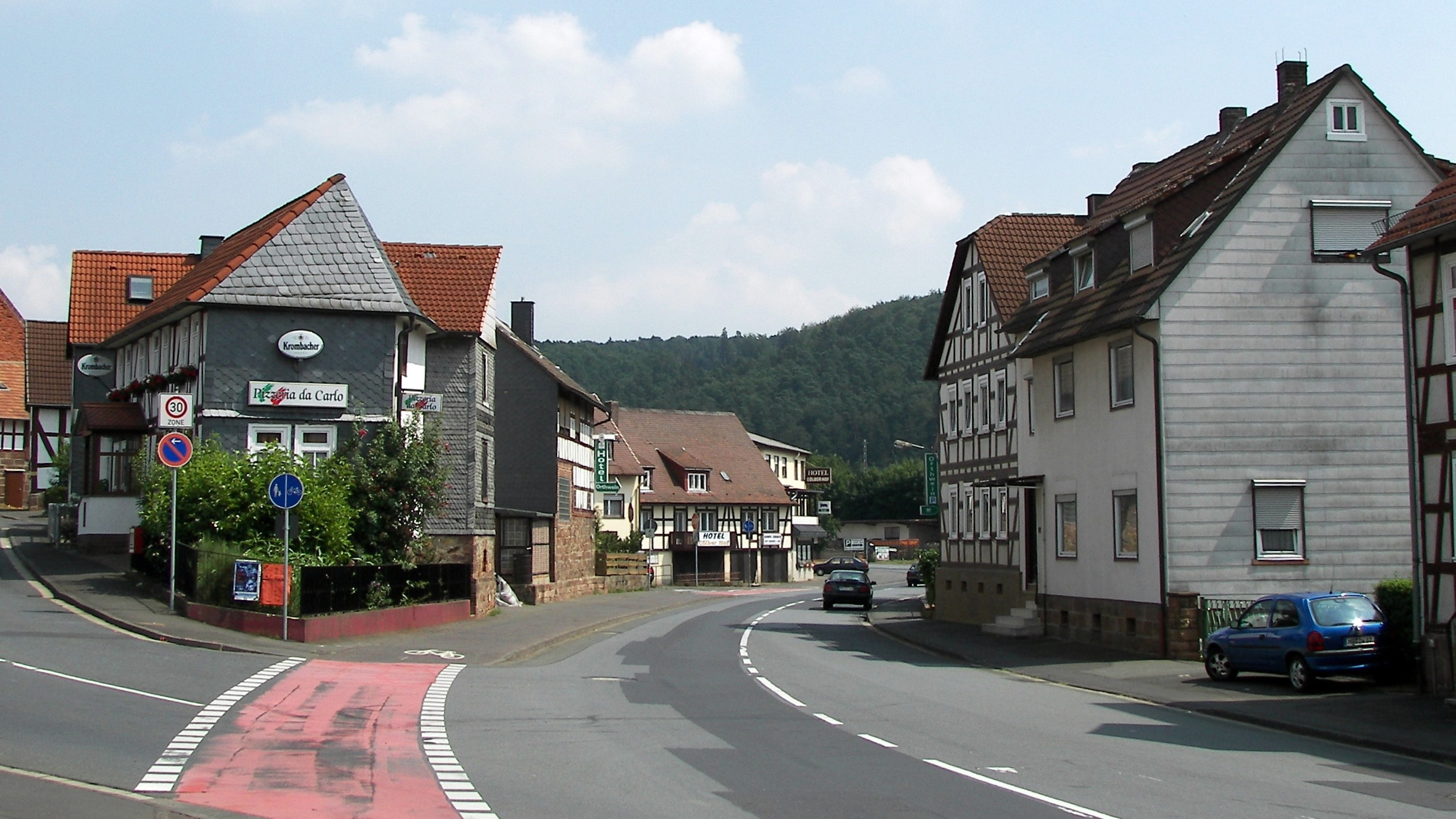
Kasseler Straße in Cölbe

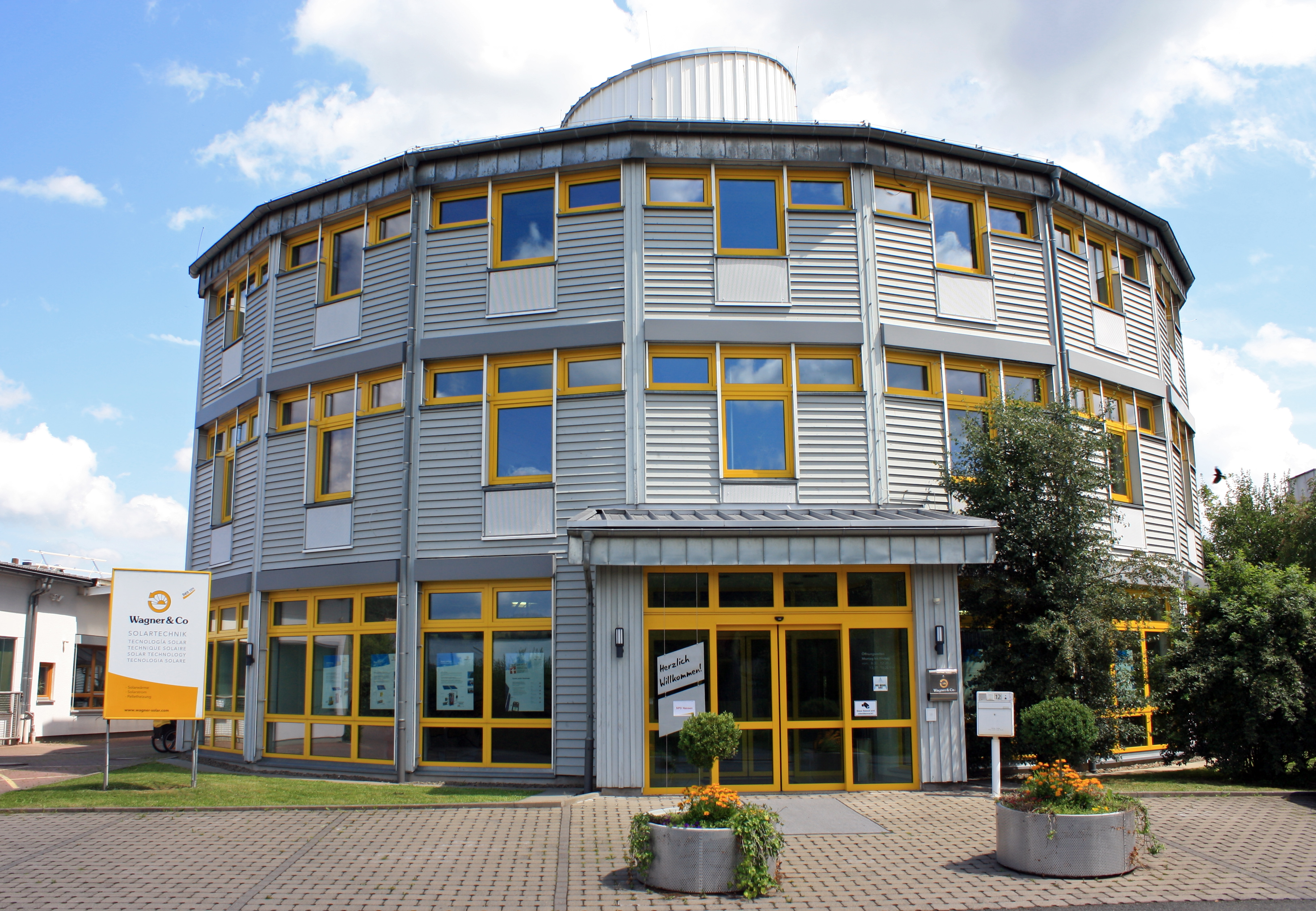
Passive solar office of Wagner company

Cölbe (German pronunciation: [ˈkœlbə]) is a municipality in Marburg-Biedenkopf district in Hesse, Germany.

== Location ==
Cölbe's municipal area lies on the southern edge of the Burgwald, a low mountain range and part of the Hessisches Bergland (Hessian Highland), and borders directly on the university city of Marburg to the south. The namesake constituent municipality is found on a bow in the river Lahn where it bends from its mainly easterly flow to a mainly southerly one.

=== Neighbouring municipalities ===
Cölbe borders in the northwest on the town of Wetter, in the northeast on the town of Rauschenberg, in the east on the town of Kirchhain, in the south on the town of Marburg, and in the west on the municipality of Lahntal (all in Marburg-Biedenkopf).

=== Divisions ===
The municipality consists of six constituent municipalities named Bernsdorf, Bürgeln, Cölbe, Reddehausen, Schönstadt and Schwarzenborn.

=== Coat of arms ===
Cölbe's civic coat of arms might be described thus: Gules a bend argent surmounted by six hearts reversed gules in bend three and three. Reversed hearts are also taken in heraldry as stylized testicles.

== Clubs ==
- Fußballverein 1927 Cölbe (football)
- Fröhlicher Kreis e.V. Cölbe ("Merry District")
- Turnverein 06 Cölbe e.V. (Gymnastics)
- Freiwillige Feuerwehr Cölbe – Bürgeln (Volunteer fire brigade)
- Schützenverein 1930/63 Cölbe e.V. (Shooting club)
- Männergesangsverein Cölbe 1878 e.V. (Men's singing club)
- Bläserchor 1901 Schönstadt e.V. (Brass Band)

== Politics ==
As of municipal elections on 14 March 2021, seats on the municipal council are apportioned thus:

SPD	8 seats
CDU	6 seats
BL (citizens' coalition)	5 seats
Greens	8 seats

== Partnerships ==
- Kościerzyna, Poland

== Sundry ==
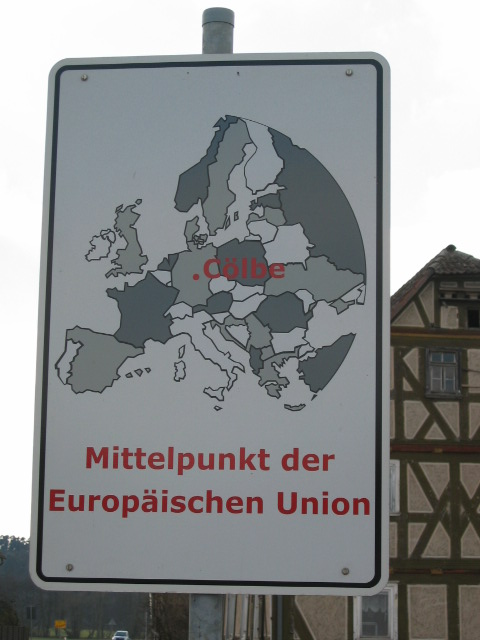
Cölbe would very much like to be the European Union's centre point

The Institute for Theoretical Geodesy in Bonn has ascertained that the European Union's centre point after the 2004 expansion lies at the coordinates 50°51′10″N 8°46′43″E. This spot is to be found within Cölbe's municipal limits, 895 m from the municipality's own centre point. Newer efforts delving into this question, however, have yielded different results, putting the EU's centre point most recently at Gadheim in Bavaria.
