= Lumda (river) =

River in Germany

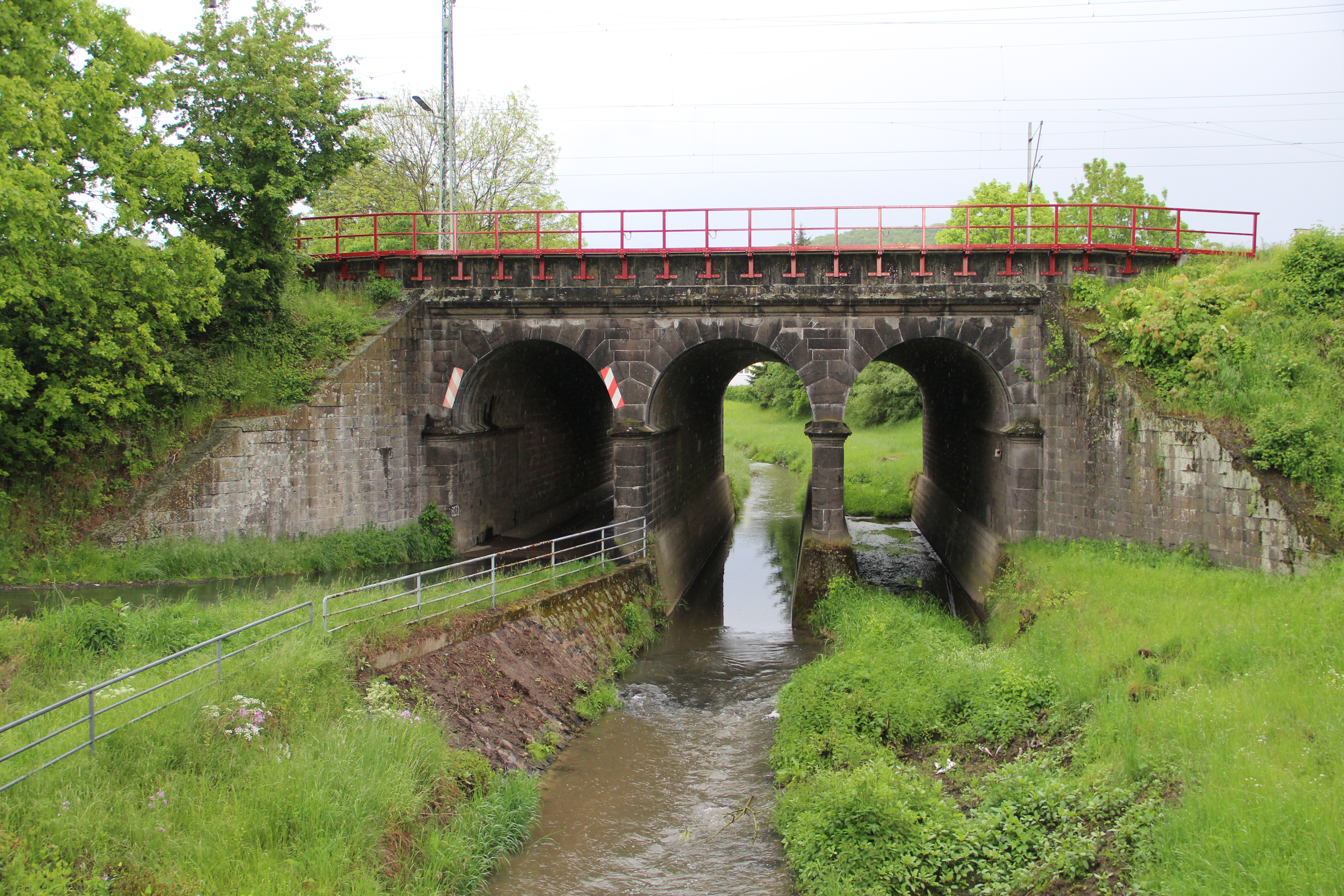

Location
- Country: Germany
- State: Hesse

Physical characteristics
- Mouth
  - location: Lahn
  - coordinates: 50.6430°N 8.6962°E
- Length: 30.2 km (18.8 mi)
- Basin size: 131 km^{2} (51 sq mi)

Basin features
- Progression: Lahn→ Rhine→ North Sea

Lumda is a river of Hesse, Germany. It flows into the Lahn in Lollar.

== See also ==
- List of rivers of Hesse
