= Lahn =

Right tributary of Rhine river in Germany

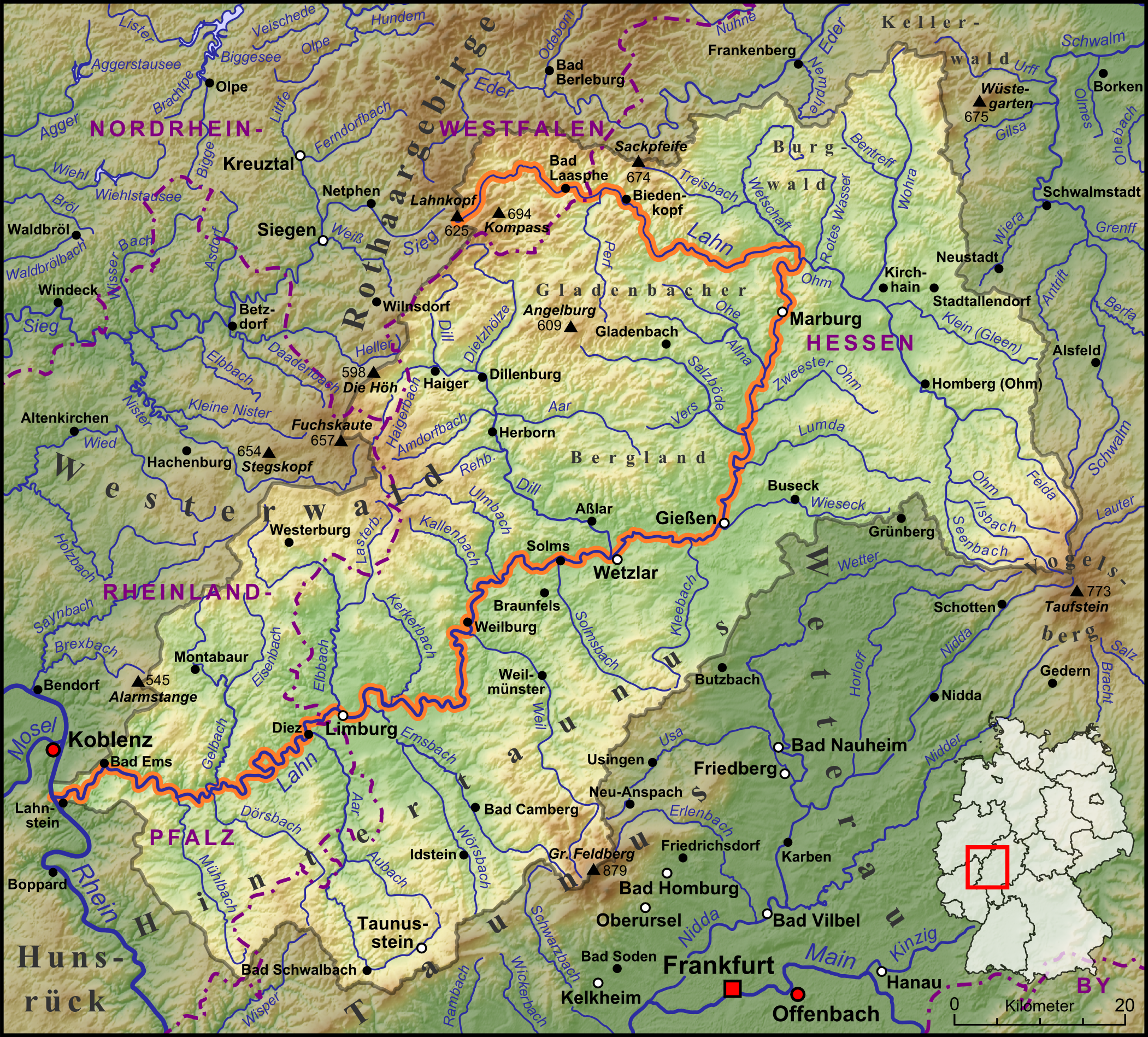
- Map of the Lahn from its source in the Rothaargebirge to its mouth near Koblenz

Location
- Country: Germany

Physical characteristics
- Source
  - location: Near the Lahnhof in the municipality of Netphen, North Rhine-Westphalia
  - coordinates: 50°53′32″N 8°14′30″E
  - elevation: 602 m (1,975 ft)
- Mouth
  - location: Rhine at Lahnstein, Rhineland-Palatinate
  - coordinates: 50°18′32″N 7°35′42″E
  - elevation: 61 m (200 ft)
- Length: 245.6 km (152.6 mi)
- Basin size: 5,925.6 km^{2} (2,287.9 sq mi)
- Discharge
  - average: 54 m^{3}/s (1,900 cu ft/s)

Basin features
- Progression: Rhine→ North Sea

The Lahn (German pronunciation: [laːn]) is a 245.6-kilometre-long (152.6 mi), right (or eastern) tributary of the Rhine in Germany. Its course passes through the federal states of North Rhine-Westphalia (23.0 km), Hesse (165.6 km), and Rhineland-Palatinate (57.0 km).

It has its source in the Rothaargebirge, the highest part of the Sauerland, in North Rhine-Westphalia. The Lahn meets the Rhine at Lahnstein, near Koblenz. Important cities along the Lahn include Marburg, Gießen, Wetzlar, Limburg an der Lahn, Weilburg and Bad Ems.

Tributaries to the Lahn include the Ohm, Dill, the Weil and the Aar. The lower Lahn has many dams with locks, allowing regular shipping from its mouth up to Runkel. Riverboats also operate on a small section north of the dam in Gießen.

== Source area ==
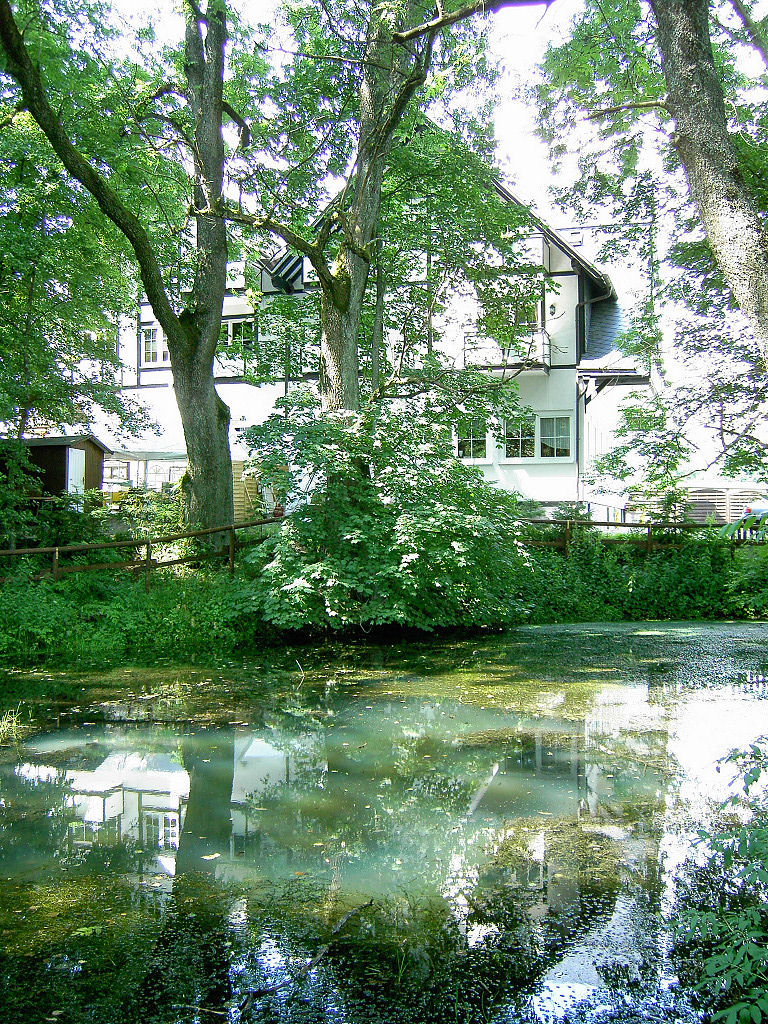
Source of the Lahn at the Lahnhof

The Lahn is a 245.6-kilometer (152.6 mi)-long, right (or eastern) tributary of the Rhine in Germany. Its course passes through the federal states of North Rhine-Westphalia (23.0 km), Hesse (165.6 km), and Rhineland-Palatinate (57.0 km).

The Lahn originates at the Lahnhof, a locality of Nenkersdorf, which is a constituent community of Netphen in southeastern North Rhine-Westphalia, near the border with Hesse. The source area is situated along the Eisenstraße scenic highway and the Rothaarsteig hiking trail.

The river arises in the southeastern Rothaargebirge in the Ederkopf-Lahnkopf-Rücken ridge-line natural area. This ridge is the drainage divide between the Rhine and Weser, and, within the Rhine system, the watershed between the rivers Lahn and Sieg.

The source is at an elevation of 600 meters (2,000 ft) and is located southwest of the 624 m (2,047 ft) high Lahnkopf. In the vicinity are also the origins of the Eder (5.5 km northwest of the Lahnhof) and the Sieg (another 3 km north). Whereas the Sieg takes the shortest route to the Rhine (to the west), the Lahn first runs in the opposite direction, paralleling the Eder for many kilometers.

== Course ==
The Lahn first flows in a northeasterly direction through the southeastern Rothaargebirge and its foothills. From about the Bad Laasphe community of Feudingen, it turns primarily to the east.

=== Upper Lahntal and Wetschaft Depression ===
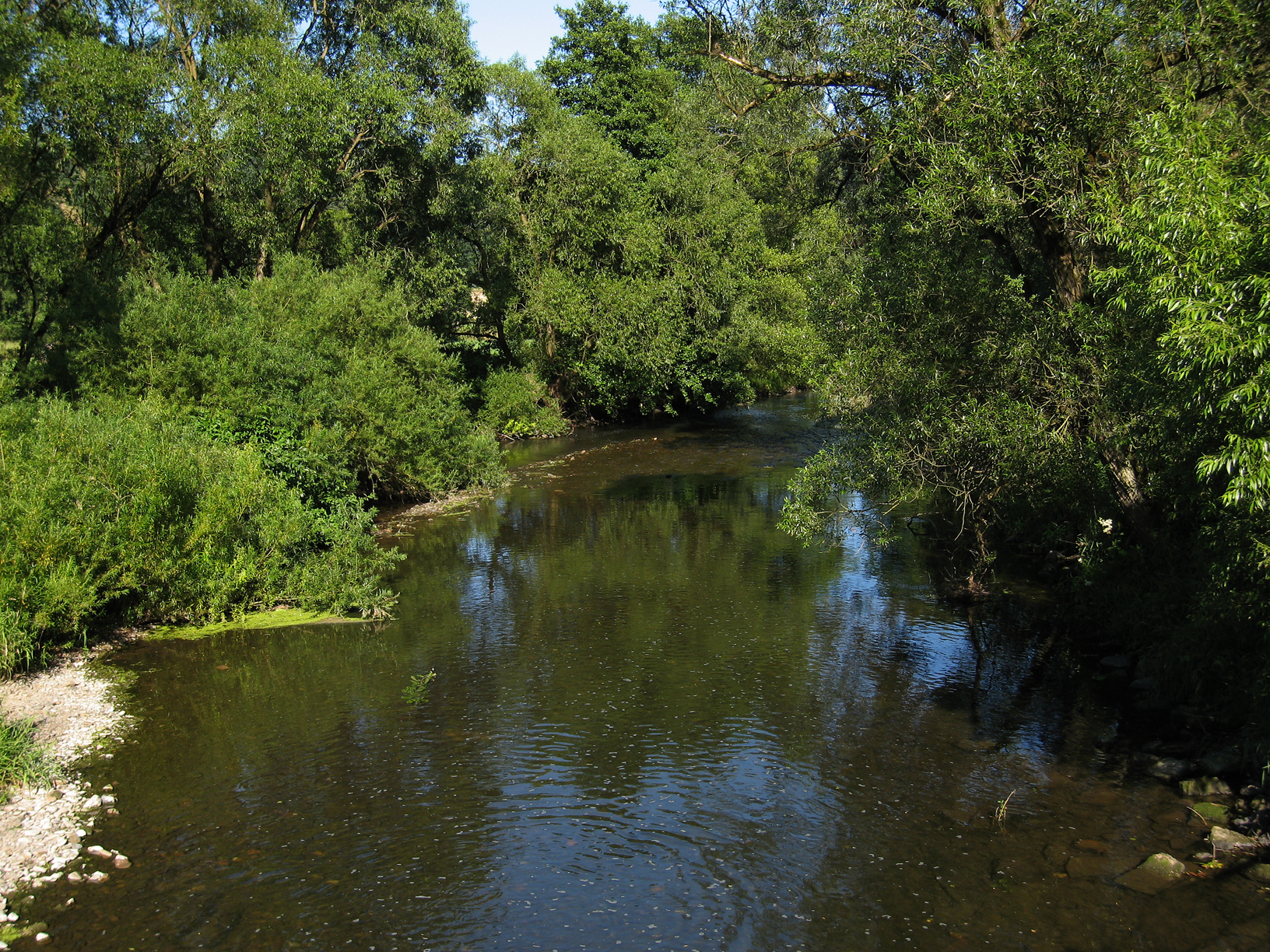
The confluence of the Wetschaft with the Lahn

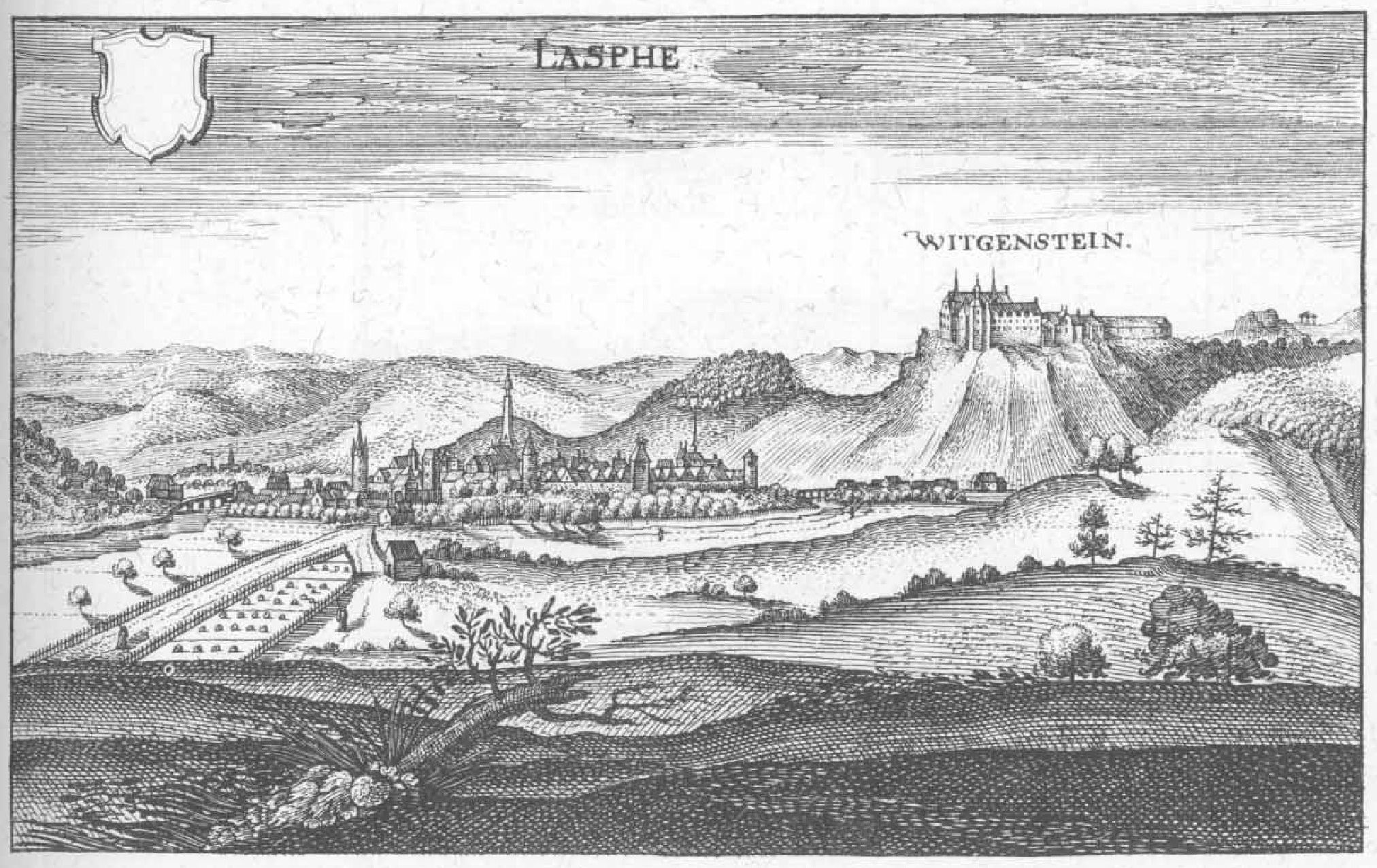
The Upper Lahn Valley at Bad Laasphe from the Topographia Hassiae of Matthäus Merian, 1655

The section of the Lahn below the town of Bad Laasphe is geographically known as the Upper Lahn Valley (German: Ober Lahntal). Above Bad Laasphe, where the river flows between the Rothaargebirge on the left (i.e. to the north) and the Gladenbach Uplands on the right, the Lahn Valley is simply considered part of these mountains.

Between Niederlaasphe (of Bad Laasphe) and Wallau (of Biedenkopf), the river crosses the border between North Rhine-Westphalia and Hesse. It then flows in an easterly direction through some districts of Biedenkopf (but not the central town) and the towns of Dautphetal and Lahntal. It is joined from the right by the Perf at Wallau and at Friedensdorf (of Dautphetal) by the Dautphe (which flows in a side valley to the south).

Shortly after the village of Caldern (of Lahn Valley), the ridgeline of the Rothaargebirge on the north ends with the Wollenberg and that of the Gladenbach Bergland with the Hungert. The Lahn leaves the Rhenish Slate Mountains for a long section and reaches the West Hesse Highlands, where it flows through the extreme south of the Wetschaft Depression, north of the Marburger Rücken. Where the Wetschaft flows into it from the Burgwald forest in the north (near the Lahntal village of Göttingen), the Lahn immediately changes direction by 90° to the right.

=== Marburg-Gießen Lahntal ===
The now southward-flowing Lahn then enters the Marburg-Gießen Lahntal. Shortly before Cölbe, the Ohm enters from the left at the Lahn-Knie named area. Flowing from the Vogelsberg through the Ohmtal, the Ohm is the Lahn's longest tributary, with a length of 59.7 kilometres (37.1 mi).

The river then breaks through a sandstone mesa (the Marburger Rücken to the west and the Lahnberge to the east) into a valley which encompasses the entire territory of the city of Marburg and its suburbs. The valley begins after the river passes the Marburger Rücken near Niederweimar, where the Allna enters from the right. At the valley's southern end, the Zwesten Ohm enters from the Lahnberge. The right (western) side of the valley is again formed by the Gladenbacher Bergland, from which the Salzböde enters the Lahn. On the left rises the Lumda Plateau, from which the eponymous river Lumda flows into the Lahn near Lollar. Gradually the valley widens into the Gießen Basin.

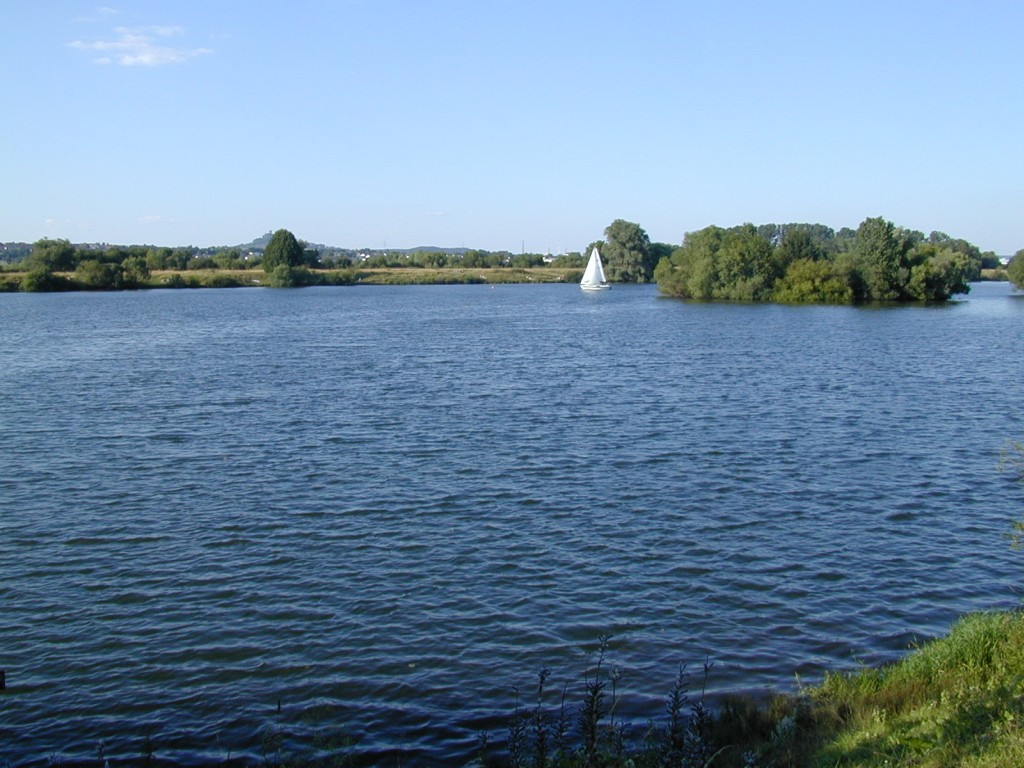
Heuchelheim Lake

In Gießen, after the inflow of the Wieseck from the left, the Lahn's general direction of flow changes from the south to the west. The Gießen Basin extends a few more miles downstream to Atzbach, a suburb of Lahnau. From the 1960s until the 1980s, there was extensive gravel mining in this area. The area between Heuchelheim, Lahnau, and the Wetzlar borough of Dutenhofen was to be completely mined and a water sports center with an Olympic-suitable rowing course built. This plan was partly realized, and the Heuchelheim Lake and Dutenhofen Lake are now popular recreational destinations for the surrounding region. Nature conservation organizations, however, were able to prevent further gravel mining, so the area is now one of the largest nature reserves in Hesse. Dutenhofen Lake marks Kilometer 0 of the Lahn as a federal waterway.

The Gießen Basin is surrounded by the mountain peaks of the Gleiberg, the Vetzberg, the Dünsberg, and the Schiffenberg. At Wetzlar, the Lahn is joined by its second longest tributary, the Dill, which has a length of 55.0 kilometres (34.2 mi). At this location, the valleys of the Lahn and Dill separate three parts of the Rhenish Slate Mountains from each other: the Gladenbach Bergland, the Westerwald to the northwest, and the Taunus to the south.

=== Weilburg Lahntal ===
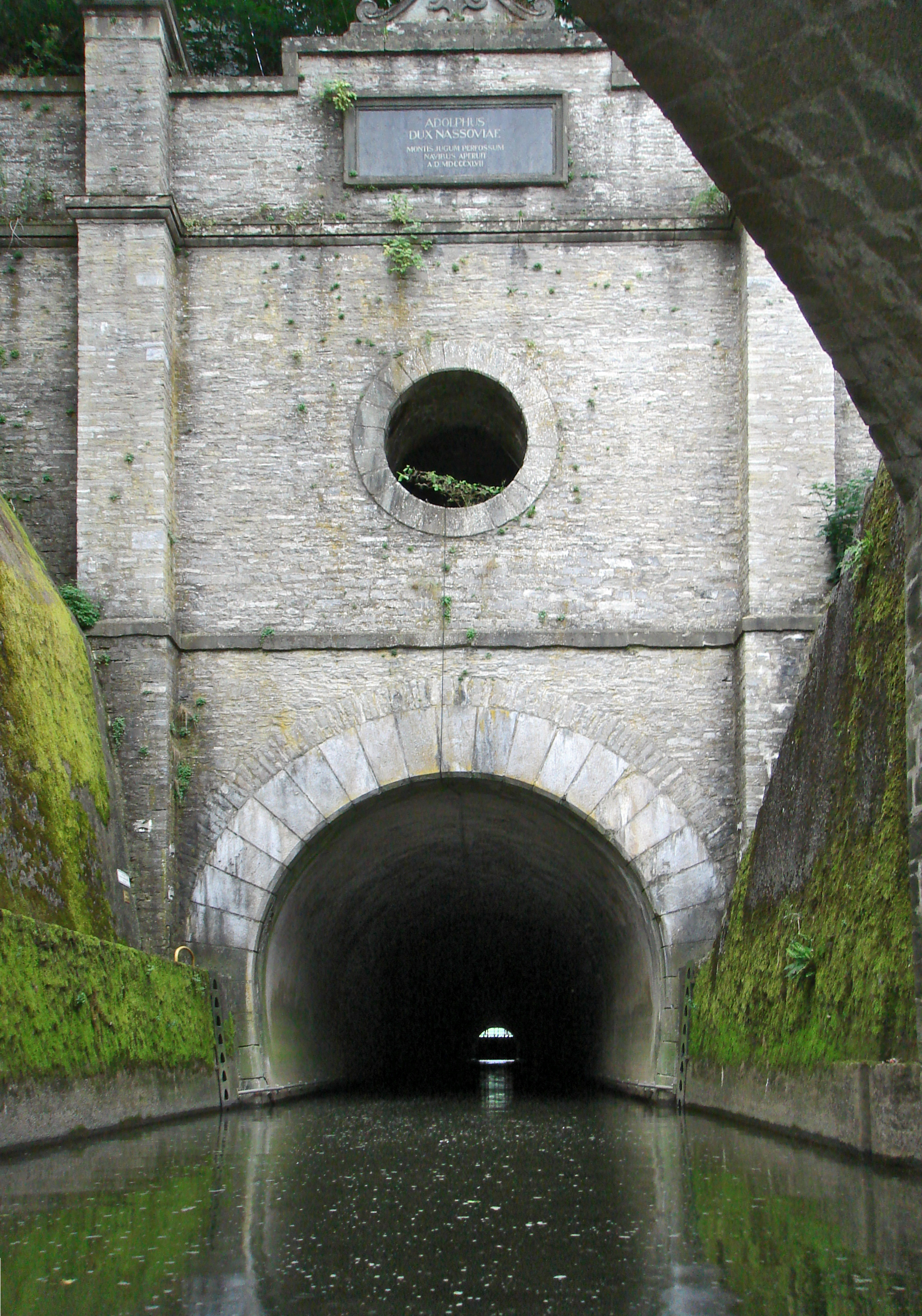
Weilburg boat tunnel

After Wetzlar, the valley of the Lahn gradually narrows and at Leun enters the Weilburger Lahntal. The Weilburger Lahntal belongs to the larger Gießen-Koblenzer Lahntal physiographic province, considered part of the Rhenish Slate Mountains.

In the upper area of the Weilburg Lahntal (the Löhnberg Basin) are mineral springs, such as the famous Selters mineral spring in the municipality of Löhnberg. In the lower area, where the river turns again to the south, the Lahn is entrenched canyon-like below the level of the surrounding geographic trough.

The city of Weilburg is wrapped by a marked loop of the river. The neck of this noose is traversed by a boat tunnel, unique in Germany. A little below Weilburg, the Weil, originating in the High Taunus, enters the Lahn.

=== Limburger Basin ===
At Aumenau in the municipality of Villmar, the course of the Lahn reverses to the west again and enters the fertile Limburger Basin, where the river is incised to a depth of about 50 metres (160 ft). Here the river is joined by two tributaries, the Emsbach coming from the Taunus and the Elbbach from the Westerwald. In this area are frequent outcroppings of Devonian limestone, the so-called Lahn Marble (German: Lahnmarmor), such as at Limburg an der Lahn, where the Limburg Cathedral crowns such an outcropping. At Limburg, the river again enters a wider valley.

=== Lower Lahntal ===
Below Diez, the Lahn absorbs the Aar from the south. At Fachingen in the municipality of Birlenbach, it leaves the Limburger Basin and enters the Lower Lahntal. Its course is incised over 200 metres (660 ft) deep in the Slate Mountains. Near Obernhof, the Gelbach enters the Lahn opposite Arnstein Abbey. Then, after passing Nassau and Bad Ems, where, as in Fachingen, mineral springs (sources of Emser salt) can be found, it completes its 242 km (150 mi) run, entering the Rhine in Lahnstein, located five kilometers south of Koblenz at an elevation of 61 metres (200 ft).

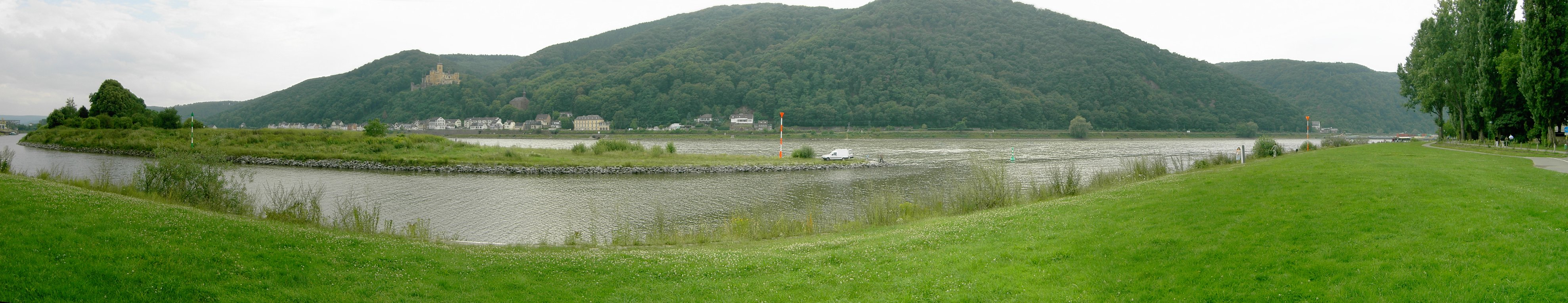
Confluence of the Lahn with the Rhine near Niederlahnstein (opposite Koblenz-Stolzenfels with Schloss Stolzenfels)

== History ==
=== Early history ===
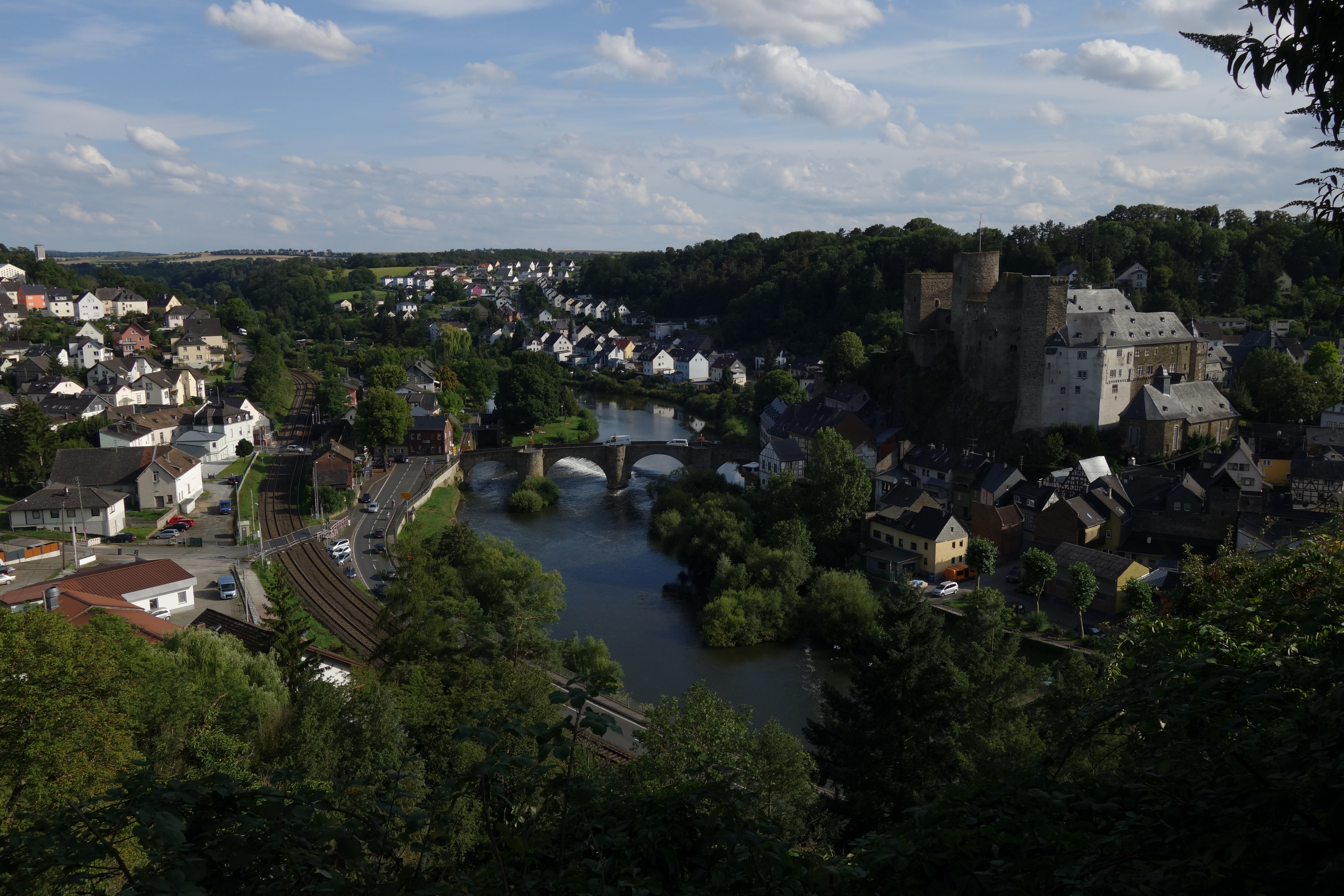
View from Schadeck Castle over Runkel and the Lahn

The Lahn area was settled as early as in the Stone Age, as shown by archaeological finds near Diez, in Steeden in the community of Runkel, and in Wetzlar. Recent discoveries in Dalheim on the western edge of Wetzlar show a c. 7000-year-old Linear Pottery culture settlement. There are also remains a Germanic settlement in the location, dated to around the 1st century, situated above a bend of the Lahn.

In the Roman Era, the Lahn presumably was used by the Romans to supply their fort at Bad Ems, Kastell Ems. Here the Limes Germanicus on the borders of Germania Superior and Rhaetia crossed the Lahn. Archaeological finds are known from Niederlahnstein, as well as from Lahnau. One Lahnau site, the Waldgirmes Forum in the community of Waldgirmes, was discovered in the 1990s and had been the site of a Roman town. Another site in the community of Dorlar has the remains of a Roman marching camp (or castra). These Lahnau sites have significant altered the current understanding of the history of the Romans east of the Rhine and north of the Limes.

During the Migration Period, the Alamanni settled in the lower Lahntal. They were later ousted by the Franks.

The origin and meaning of the name Lahn are uncertain; it is possible that it is a pre-Germanic word. The form of the name changed over time; before 600, variations like Laugona, Logana, Logene or Loyn are typical. The oldest known use of the current spelling of the name dates to 1365.

The oldest mention of the staple right of Diez dates to the early 14th century and is an indication of significant shipping on the Lahn by that time. In 1559, John VI of Nassau-Dillenburg laid out a towpath on the lower Lahn. In 1606, for the first time, the Lahn was deepened to allow small scale shipping and the lower reaches became navigable for four to five months of the year. However, there were numerous weirs with only narrow gaps, so the traffic remained restricted to small boats.

In the 17th and early 18th centuries, there were several initiatives of adjacent princes to further expand the Lahn as a waterway, but they all failed due to lack of coordination. In 1740, the Archbishopric of Trier began construction to make the mouth of the Lahn passable for larger vessels. In winter of 1753/54, bank stabilization and creation of towpaths were done along the entire length of the river. Then the river was passable for vessels with up to 240 hundredweights of cargo downstream and up to 160 hundredweights upstream.

By the end of the 19th century, over 300 castles, fortresses, fortified churches, and similar buildings were built along the river.

=== Shipping during the Industrial Revolution ===
During the French occupation, inspections of the river began in 1796, which were to be followed by a comprehensive expansion. Due to political developments, however, this expansion did not take place. The newly created Duchy of Nassau eventually began work from 1808 under the Chief Construction Inspector of Kirn to make the Lahn fully navigable. In the first winter, the section of the riverside from the mouth to Limburg was stabilized, particularly so that the course could be narrowed in shallow places. It was planned in the long run to make the Lahn navigable as far as Marburg and from there to construct a canal to Fulda to connect it with the Weser. This would create a waterway from France to North Sea via the states of the Confederation of the Rhine. Upstream of Limburg, however, the work was slow, partly because the population pressed into emergency service only reluctantly cooperated. Large parts of the shore were only secured with fascines, which rotted shortly thereafter.

In 1816 the Duchy of Nassau and the Kingdom of Prussia agreed to expand the Lahn as far as Giessen, where it joined the Grand Duchy of Hesse. Little is known about the work that followed, but in the 1825 boatmen on the Lahn who shipped mineral water from springs in Selters and Fachingen addressed a letter of appreciation to the Nassau government in Wiesbaden for the rehabilitation of river systems. Overall, however, there seems to have been only repairs and temporary works accomplished through the 1830s.

The earliest attempts to count ship traffic on the Lahn dated from 1827. At the lock at Runkel, 278 vessels were counted in that year, with the state government of Nassau explicitly pointing out that most of the river traffic travelled from the mouth to Limburg, or with smaller boats from the upper reaches to Weilburg, and only a small part passed Runkel. In 1833, however, 464 vessels were counted. The main reason for the increase is likely the increase in iron ore mining in the surroundings of Weilburg. An estimate from 1840 placed the quantity of iron ore transported on the entire river at approximately 2000 boat loads, though the river was only navigable from the mouth to Weilburg. In addition, mainly cereals and mineral water were transported downriver. Upriver, the boats carried primarily coal, charcoal, gypsum, and colonial goods. Around 1835, about 80 larger shallow-draft boats were in operation on the Lahn.

Given the increasing ore mining in the Lahn Valley, officials from Nassau and Prussia in 1841 made an inspection trip along the river from Marburg to the Rhine. The Prussians were the driving force behind river expansion projects, seeking to establish a connection between Wetzlar and their Rhine Province and to secure the iron ore supply for the growing industry in the Ruhr Valley. Until 1844, Hesse-Darmstadt also joined expansion efforts, while Hesse-Kassel declined participation. The participating governments agreed to make the Lahn passable as far as Gießen for boats that were significantly larger than the existing vehicles on the river. In Prussian territory, the work was largely completed by 1847, including construction of locks in Dorlar, Wetzlar, Wetzlar-Blechwalze, Oberbiel and Niederbiel. In Nassau's territory, locks were built at Löhnberg, Villmar, and Balduinstein, as well as the greatest technical achievement: the Weilburg ship tunnel. The river bank reinforcement and channel deepening along Nassau's section of the Lahn, however, was slow. Moreover, when the lock at Limburg fell short of the width contractually agreed upon, Nassau refused an extension. This led to several clashes between Nassau and Prussia in the following years until Nassau had finally fulfilled its obligations in 1855.

Despite the expansion, boats on the Lahn could travel fully loaded only from Gießen to Löhnberg. There, they had to lighten their load in order to reduce their draft and continue the journey. Also, this was only during two to three months. In a further four to five months per year, the load had to be reduced even earlier due to the low water level. The rest of the year the Lahn was not passable. From Wetzlar to Lahnstein, where the freight was unloaded onto the large barges of the Rhine, the boats took three to four days. A trip from Wetzlar to the mouth and then towed back with horses lasted for about 14 days in good conditions. At that time, there were mainly two types of transport boats in use: those with a capacity of 350 hundredweights and a larger variant with a capacity of 1300 hundredweights.

In 1857 to 1863, the Lahntal railway (Lahntalbahn) was built, with nine major bridges and 18 tunnels along the river. Afterward, Prussia and Nassau tried to keep shipping along the Lahn alive through the lowering of tariffs. Ultimately, however, rail gained acceptance as a means of transport and cargo shipping on the Lahn gradually declined. Several projects begun in 1854 to operate steamboats on the Lahn died in their infancy. In 1875, 1885 and 1897 the Prussian government discussed plans for the transformation of the Lahn into a canal, which would allow the passage for larger vessels, but these plans were never implemented. Only in places was the riverbed dredged, such as around 1880 near Runkel, from 1905 to 1907 from the mouth to Bad Ems, and from 1925 to 1928 from the mouth to Steeden.

In 1964, an expansion of the Lahn for 300-ton vessels was completed. In 1981, freight shipping on the Lahn came to an end. Today, the Lahn is used exclusively for recreational boats.

=== Recent history ===
In 1960, gravel mining began in the broad plains of the Lahn Valley in Marburg and Giessen. This ended in 1996 and large sections of Lahn Valley in Hesse were set aside as a nature reserve

On 7 February 1984, the Lahn experienced a 100-year flood, which caused millions of German Marks in damage. This has since led to a central flood warning system and coordination of flood control efforts through the regional council of Giessen.

== Boating ==
The Lahn, from a point between Lahnau and Dutenhofen (Wetzlar) to its confluence the Rhine, is designated as a federal waterway. In this area, it is subject to the Water and Shipping Administration of the federal government, with the responsible office being that at Koblenz.

The middle and lower section of the Lahn is navigable and has a large number of locks. The waterway is used almost exclusively by smaller motor yachts for tourists, as well as paddled- and rowboats. For non-motorized watercraft, the Lahn can be used for the entire length between Roth (of Weimar) and the Rhine.

From the mouth upwards to Dehrn (of Runkel), Lahn-km 70 (above Limburg), the river is consistently passable for larger vessels, with locks operated by personnel. The Water and Shipping Administration guarantees a minimum water depth of 1.60 m in the navigation channel. There are stream gauges at Kalkofen (of Dörnberg) (normal water level 1.80 m) and at Leun. Above Dehrn there are manual locks and frequent shoals, making the passage of boats difficult. Two weirs in Wetzlar are an obstruction to shipping further upriver.

== Economy and tourism ==
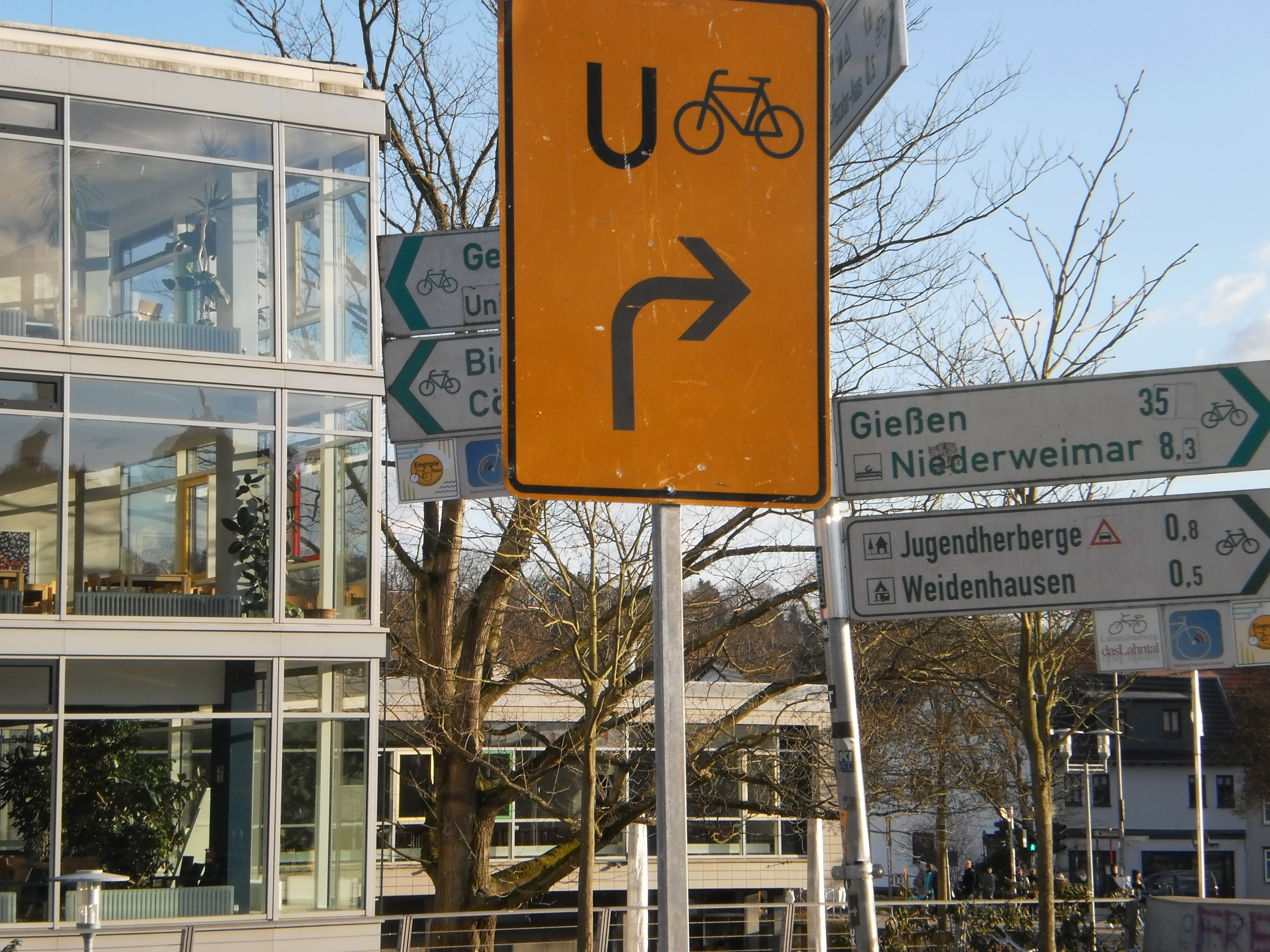
Cycling route signs of 'Lahntalradweg' from University of Marburg Cafeteria on bank of the Lahn river to the North and the South of trail (March 2017)

Since the late 1980s, there have been increasing attempts to promote the Lahn for ecotourism and to coordinate and expand the existing uses. There were first tourism associations at the state level, and these have now joined into the Lahntal Tourist Association.

The Lahntal bike path 'Lahntalradweg' leads through the Lahn Valley, along the Lahn Holiday Road. It is accessible from the Upper Lahn Valley Railway between Feudingen and Marburg, the Main-Weser Railway between Marburg and Giessen, as well as the Lahntal railway between Giessen and Friedrichssegen. For walkers there is the Lahnhöhenwege along both sides of the Lahn from Wetzlar to Oberlahnstein. The first partial section of a pilgrimage route, the Lahn-Camino on the left side of the Lahn, leads from Wetzlar Cathedral to Lahnstein via Castle Lahneck and the Hospital Chapel.

There are 19 hydroelectric plants using the Lahn to generate electricity. Wine is produced in Obernhof and Weinähr. The wines of the Lahn region are marketed under the trade name Lahntal as Middle Rhine wines.

== Fauna and flora ==
In 1999, the Lahn was classified as Biological Grade II and Chemical Grade I. Overall it is considered natural. The migrations of fish such as salmon are hindered by the river's weirs and water levels, but attempts have been made through the installation of fish ladders to reintroduce formerly native fish. After the end of gravel mining in mid-1990s, the river between Lahnau, Heuchelheim, and Dutenhofen (of Wetzlar) in the middle Lahn Valley has developed into one of the largest nature reserves in Hesse, known as the Lahnau Nature Preserve.

== Tributaries ==
The two most important tributaries of the Lahn, and those with the largest catchment inflows, are the Ohm and the Dill. The Dill originates in the southwestern foothills of the Rothaargebirge (the Haincher Höhe) and enters the Lahn from the right. The Ohm flows from the Vogelsberg and enters from the left. It is notable that not only is the Ohm at the point of its confluence with the Lahn only one kilometre shorter from its source than the Lahn itself, but the Ohm's catchment area of 984 square kilometres (380 mi^{2}) is significantly larger than that of the Lahn above the confluence, 652 square kilometres (252 mi^{2}), or only 452 square kilometres (175 mi^{2}) before the inflow of the Wetschaft only 2 kilometres upstream.

Between the Lahn's source area in the Rothaargebirge and Gießen, all of the left tributaries are from the less mountainous parts of the West Hessian Bergland. After the turn towards the west or southwest near Gießen, all the left tributaries flow from the Hochtaunus. The right tributaries between the source area and the confluence of the Dill near Wetzlar come from the Gladenbach Bergland, while downstream they originate in the (High) Westerwald. Much of the Westerwald, in contrast, has no significant watershed, so the streams are almost random in finding their direction.

Because the highest point of the Westerwald is near the Sieg, and especially because the Taunus is very close to the Main, both Mittelgebirge are each considerably more than half drained by the Lahn. Especially the left tributaries from the Taunus flow with a strong south-north orientation. The river Emsbach runs through the Idstein Basin, which divides the (Hinter-) Taunus into two parts, while the Aar is central for the (Western and Eastern) Aartaunus.

=== Table of tributaries ===
Name	Position	Length [km]	Drainage basin area [km^{2}]	Confluence [by Lahn-km]	Mouth elevation [m above MSL]
Feudinge (Rüppersbach)	left	6.3	21.2	9.8	388
Ilse	right	8.4	11.8	10.5	382
Banfe	right	11.5	38.9	18.5	326
Laasphe	left	8.3	19.6	19.4	324
Perf	right	20.0	113.1	24.7	285
Dautphe	left	8.8	41.8	37.5	245
Wetschaft	left	29.0	196.2	56.3	192
Ohm	left	59.7	983.8	58.7	188
Allna	right	19.1	92.0	77.1	172
Zwester Ohm	left	20.0	69.5	84.0	165
Salzböde	right	27.6	137.8	87.4	164
Lumda	left	30.0	131.5	93.6	160
Wieseck	left	24.3	119.6	102.2	155
Bieber	right	13.6	34.7	105.1	151
Kleebach	left	26.9	164.6	106.2	150
Wetzbach	left	11.7	32.9	119.6	147
Dill	right	55.0	717.7	120.4	147
Solmsbach	left	24.6	112.5	128.1	141
Iserbach (Möttbach)	left	19.2	31.2	131.4	139
Ulmbach	right	22.9	60.9	138.2	135
Kallenbach	right	14.6	84.7	141.3	132
Weil	left	46.6	247.9	149.4	130
Kerkerbach	right	20.7	70.2	176.0	112
Emsbach	left	39.1	321.8	181.0	110
Elbbach	right	40.7	323.7		109
Aar	left	49.7	312.6		103
Dörsbach	left	32.0	114.0		94
Gelbach (Aubach)	right	39.7	221.2		93
Mühlbach	left	32.1	171.9		85
Emsbach	right	11.5	29.4		75

== Gallery ==
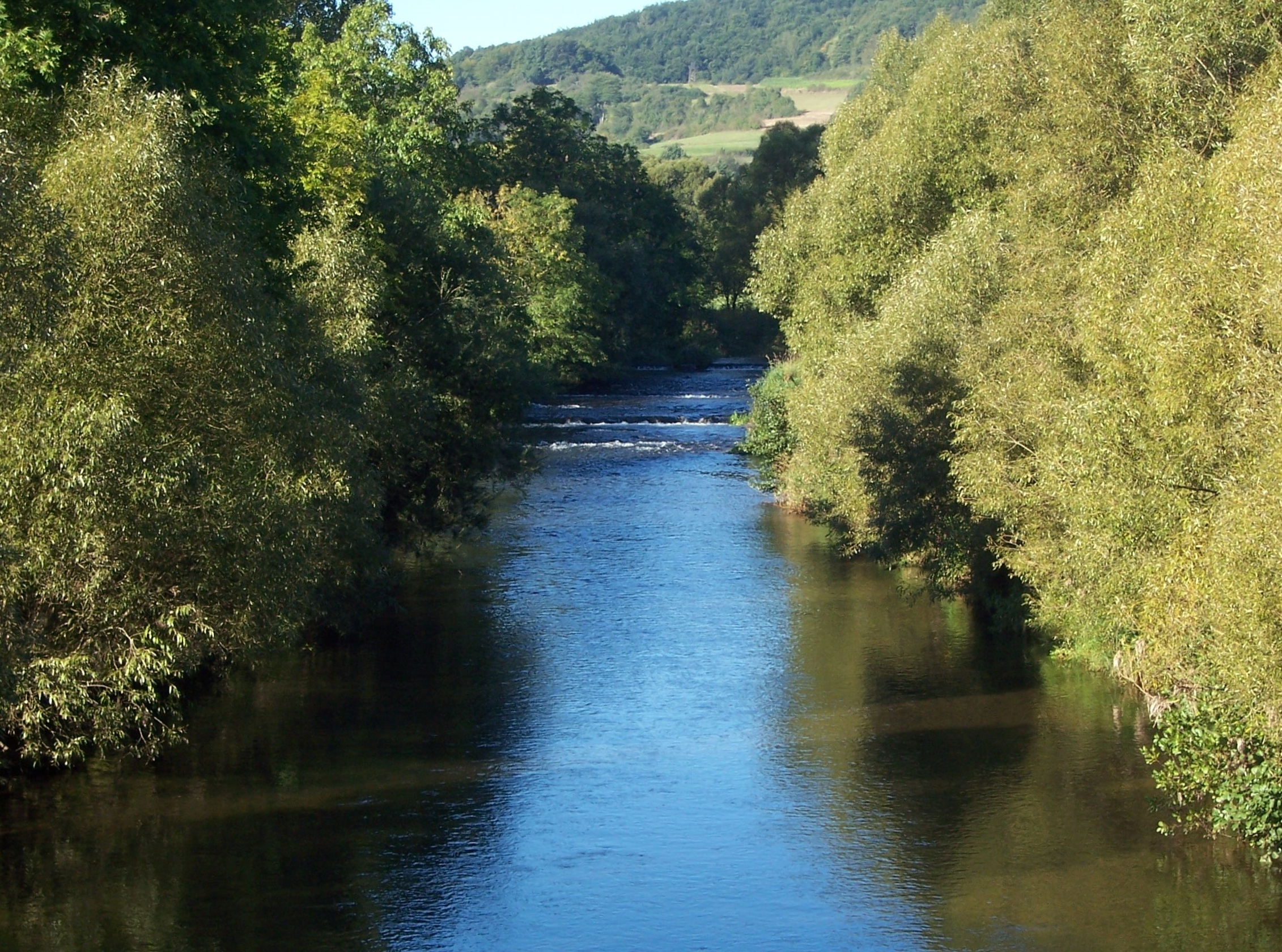
The Lahn at Buchenau in Dautphetal

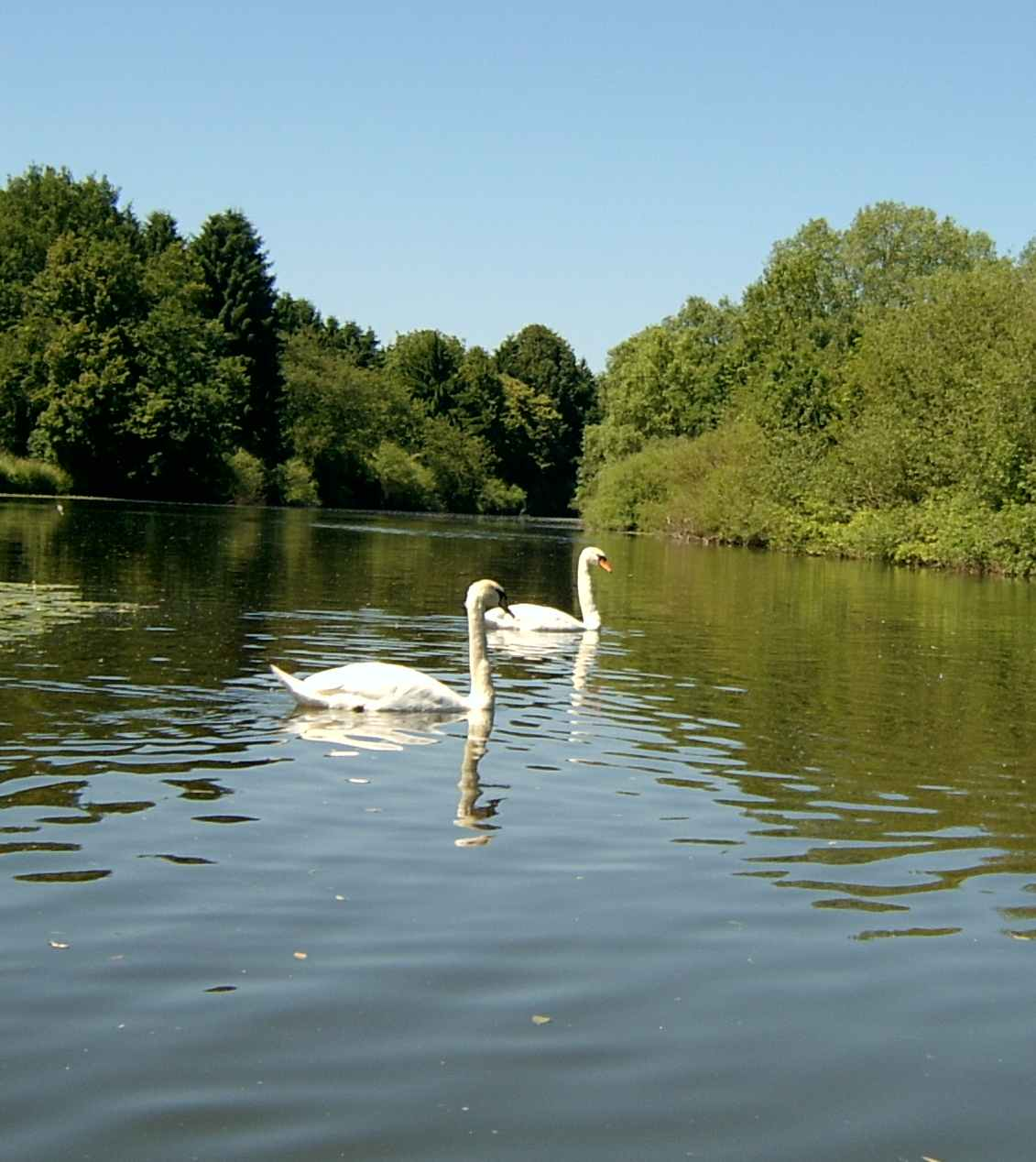
Swans on the Lahn between Gießen and Wetzlar

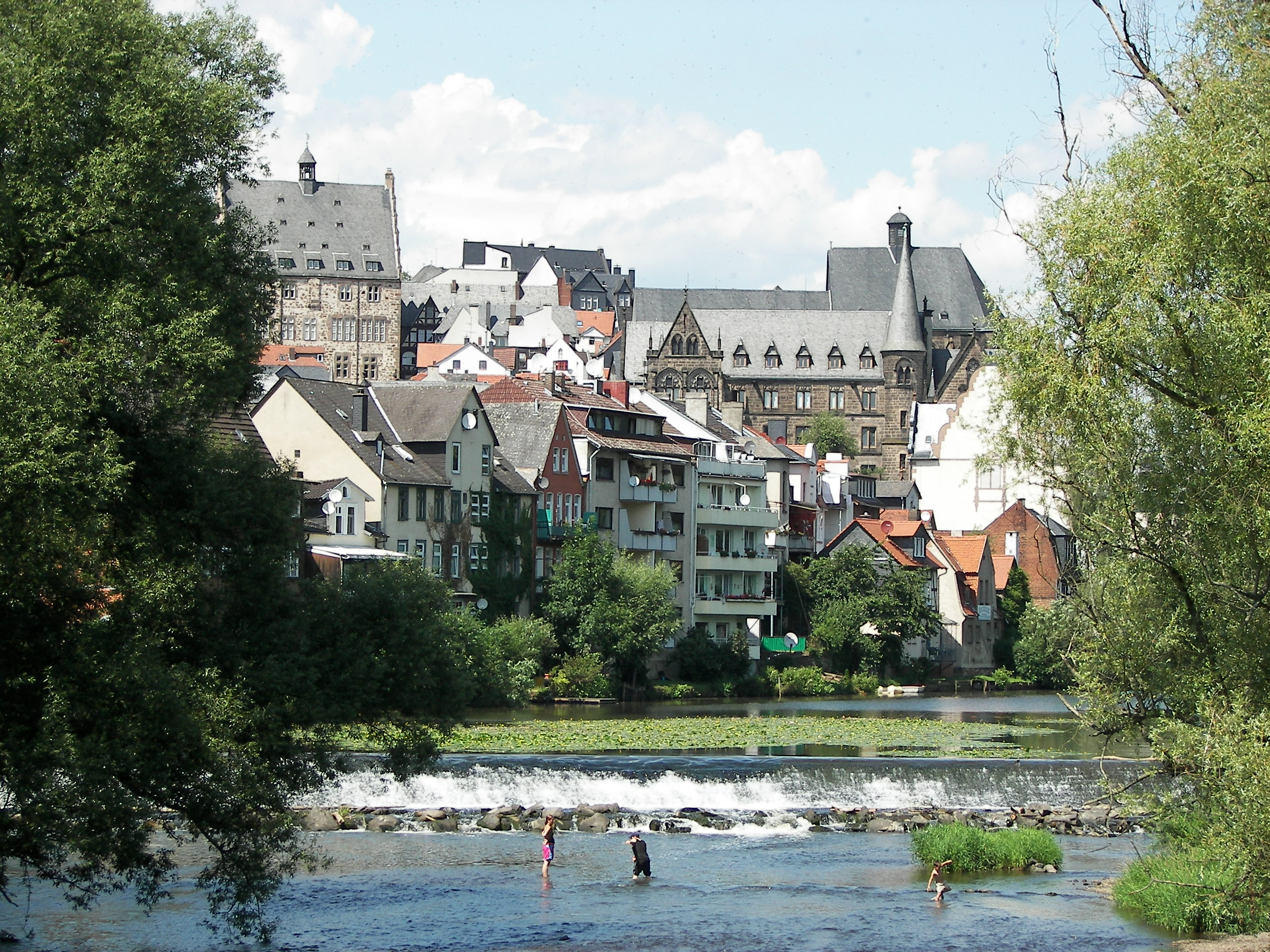
The Lahn at Marburg

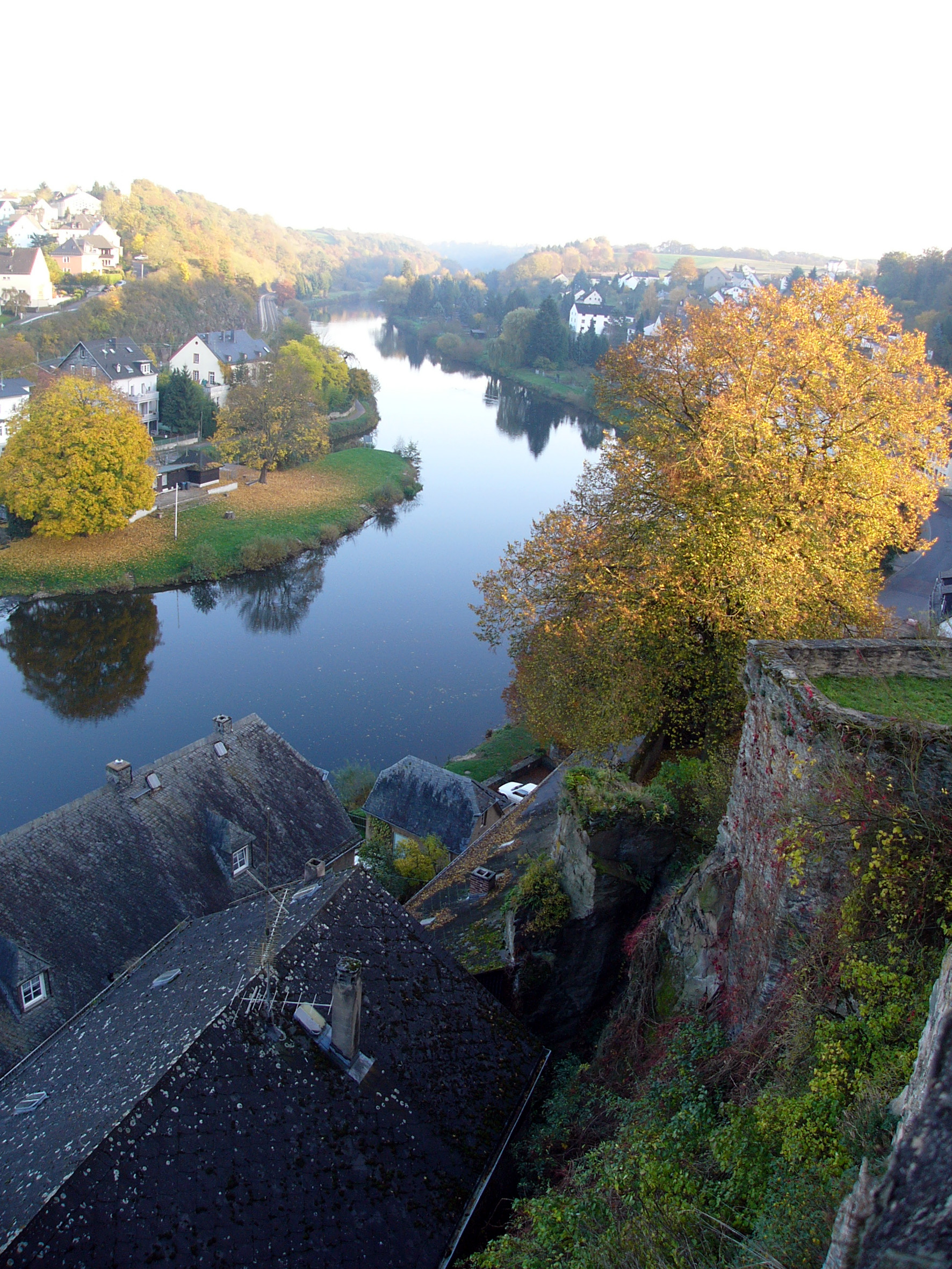
The Lahn at Runkel

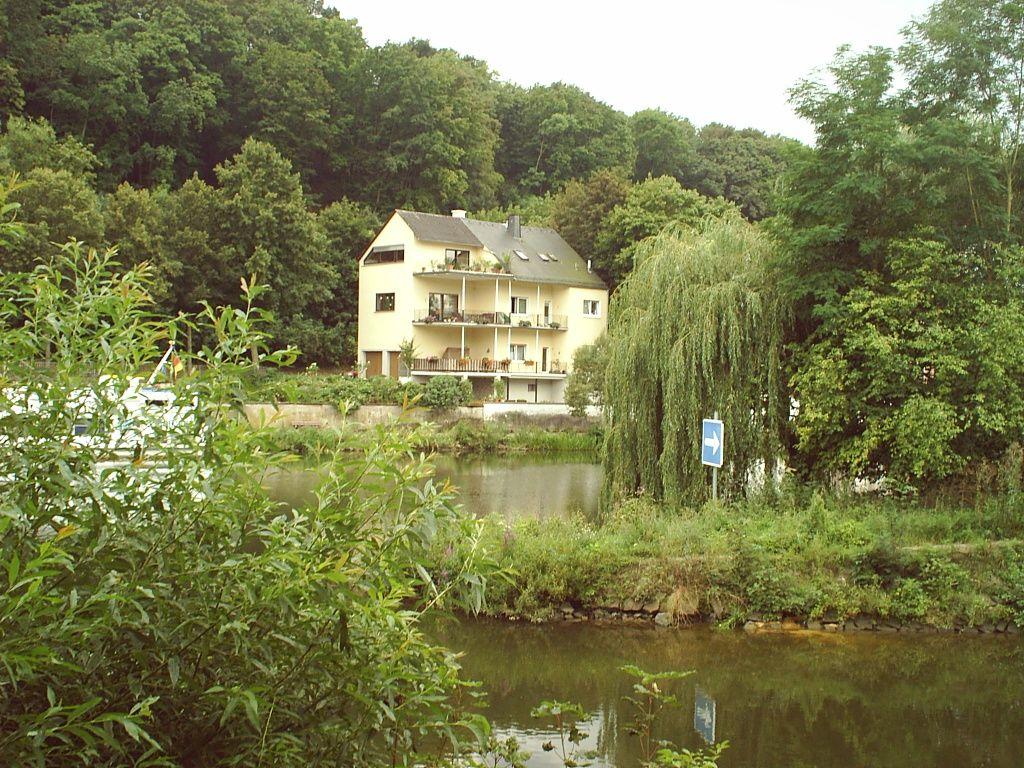
The Lahn in Limburg

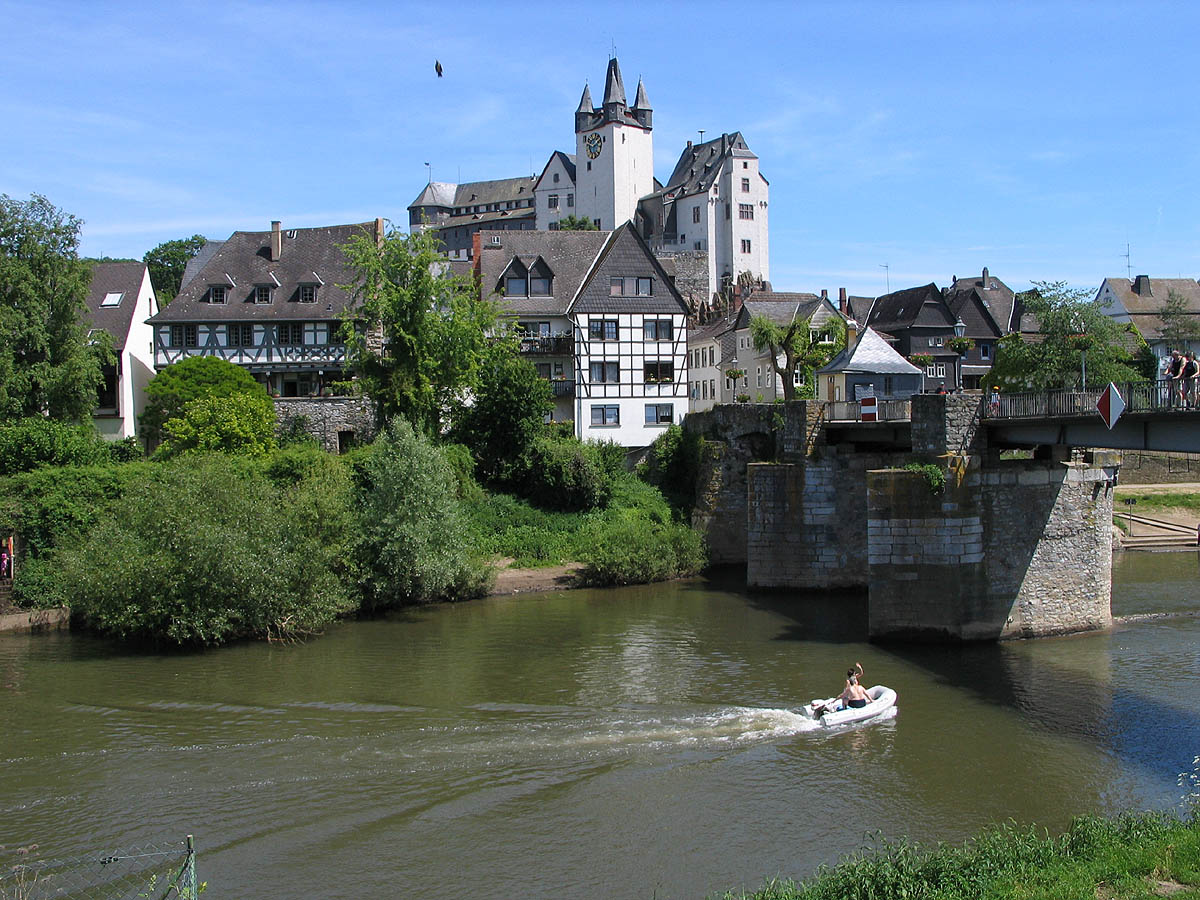
The Lahn at Diez

=== List of all tributaries ===
A list of all the tributaries of the Lahn, including their position relative to the main river (l = left; r = right) and length in kilometers, are listed in downstream order as follows:

Source to Marburg:

- Ilm (l, 2 km)
- Großenbach (l, 1.9 km)
- Ahbach (l, 3.4 km)
- Eltershauser Bach (l, 2.8 km)
- Dreisbach (l, 1.6 km)
- Auerbach (r, 2.3 km)
- Feudinge (Rüppersbach; l, 6.3 km)
- Ilse (r, 8.4 km)
- Welschebach (l, 3.3 km)
- Enderbach (l, 2.2 km)
- Banfe (r, 11.5 km)
- Wabach (r, 4.55 km)
- Laasphe (l, 8.35 km)
- Kalteborn (l, 2.2 km)
- Puderbach (l, 6.2 km)
- Perf (r, 19.95 km)
- Hainbach I (l, 5.5 km)
- Roßbach (r, 3.8 km)
- Weifenbach (l, 4.2 km)
- Hainbach II (l, 4.4 km)
- Martinsbach (r, 3.6 km)
- Dautphe (r, 8.8 km)
- Allbach (r, 2.4 km)
- Katzenbach (l, 4.7 km)
- Ellenbach (l, 3.6 km)
- Lauterbach (l, 2.4 km)
- Warzenbach (l, 5.1 km)
- Kernbach (r, 2.7 km)
- Michelbach (r, 2.7 km)
- Rodenbach (l, 4.3 km)
- Wetschaft (l, 29.0 km)
- Ohm (l, 59.7 km)

Marburg to Wetzlar:

- Allna (r, 19.1 km)
- Wenkbach (r, 7.2 km)
- Zwester Ohm (l, 20.0 km)
- Salzböde (r, 27.6 km)
- Lumda (l, 30.0 km)
- Wißmarbach (r, 6.2 km)
- Gleibach (r, 7.7 km)
- Wieseck (l, 24.3 km)
- Fohnbach (Kropbach; r, 12.0 km)
- Bieber (r, 13.6 km)
- Kleebach (l, 27.1 km)
- Welschbach (l, 7.5 km)
- Schwalbenbach (Atzbach; r, 9.5 km)
- Wetzbach (l, 11.8 km)

Wetzlar to Limburg:

- Dill (r, 55.0 km)
- Grundbach (r, 3.5 km)
- Solmsbach (l, 24.6 km)
- Iserbach (Möttbach; l, 19.2 km)
- Leuner Bach (r, 3.9 km)
- Tiefenbach (Lindelbach; l, 5.5 km)
- Ulmbach (r; 22.9 km)
- Kallenbach (r, 14.6 km)
- Worstbach (r, 3.0 km)
- Grundbach (l, 7.0 km)
- Walderbach (r, 3.7 km)
- Weil (l, 46.6 km)
- Odersbach (r, 1.7 km)
- Leistenbach (l, 4.0 km)
- Kerkerbach (r, 20.7 km)
- Tiefenbach (r, 8.5 km)
- Bachlauf in Dehrn (r, 3.7 km)
- Emsbach (l, 39.1 km)
- Kasselbach (Linterbach); l, 5.3 km)
- Elbbach (r, 40.7 km)

Limburg to Lahnstein:

- Hambach (r, 6.3 km)
- Heistenbach (r, 4.7 km)
- Aar (l, 49.7 km)
- Langenbach (r, ca. 2.7 km)
- Reiserbach (l, 2.2 km)
- Daubach (r, 8.0 km)
- Schaumburgerbach (r, 3.2 km)
- Schroarbach (r, 2.6 km)
- Kiesbach (r, 3.0 km)
- Rupbach (l, 6.8 km)
- Waselbach (r, 4.3 km)
- Dörsbach (l, 32.0 km)
- Gelbach (r, 39.7 km)
- Kallbach (Kalterbach; r, 5.4 km)
- Mühlbach (l, 32.1 km)
- Neuzenbach (r, 1.8 km)
- Unterbach (r, 5.3 km)
- Rullsbach (l, 1.5 km)
- Wiesbach (l, 2.0 km)
- Braunebach (l, 3.5 km)
- Emsbach (r, 11.5 km)
- Fachbach (r, 4.1 km)
- Schweizertalbach (l, 2.5 km)
- Erzbach (l, 3.4 km)
- Ruppertsklamm (r, 1.9 km)

== Municipalities (from source to mouth) ==
=== Kreis Siegen-Wittgenstein, North Rhine-Westphalia ===
- Netphen
- Bad Laasphe

=== Landkreis Marburg-Biedenkopf, Hesse ===
- Biedenkopf
- Dautphetal
- Lahntal
- Cölbe
- Marburg
- Weimar
- Fronhausen

=== Landkreis Gießen, Hesse ===
- Lollar
- Wettenberg
- Gießen
- Heuchelheim

=== Lahn-Dill-Kreis, Hesse ===
- Lahnau
- Wetzlar
- Solms
- Leun

=== Landkreis Limburg-Weilburg, Hesse ===
- Löhnberg
- Weilburg
- Weinbach
- Runkel
- Limburg an der Lahn

=== Rhein-Lahn-Kreis, Rhineland-Palatinate ===
Verbandsgemeinden:

- Diez
- Bad Ems-Nassau
- Lahnstein (Verband-free town)

== See also ==
- List of rivers of North Rhine-Westphalia
- List of rivers of Hesse
- List of rivers of Rhineland-Palatinate

== Sources ==
- Losse, Michael (2007). Die Lahn Burgen und Schlösser (The castles and palaces of the Lahn) (in German). Petersberg: Imhof Verlag. ISBN 978-3-86568-070-9.
- Greule, Albrecht (1998). "Gewässernamenschichten im Flußgebiet der Lahn (Hydronyms in the Lahn drainage basin" (in German). in: Norbert Nail, ed. (1998). Die Welt der Namen: Sechs namenkundliche Beiträge (The World of the Name: Six onomastic contributions). Marburg: Schriften der Universitätsbibliothek Marburg. ISBN 3-8185-0251-X., pp. 1–17.
- Landesamt für Umwelt, Wasserwirtschaft und Gewerbeaufsicht (National Office for the Environment, Water Management and Labor) (ed.): Hydrologischer Atlas Rheinland-Pfalz (Hydrological Atlas of Rhineland-Palatinate). Mainz, November 2005.
- Lahn entry at the Encyclopædia Britannica
