= Lollar =

Town in Hesse, Germany

- Town
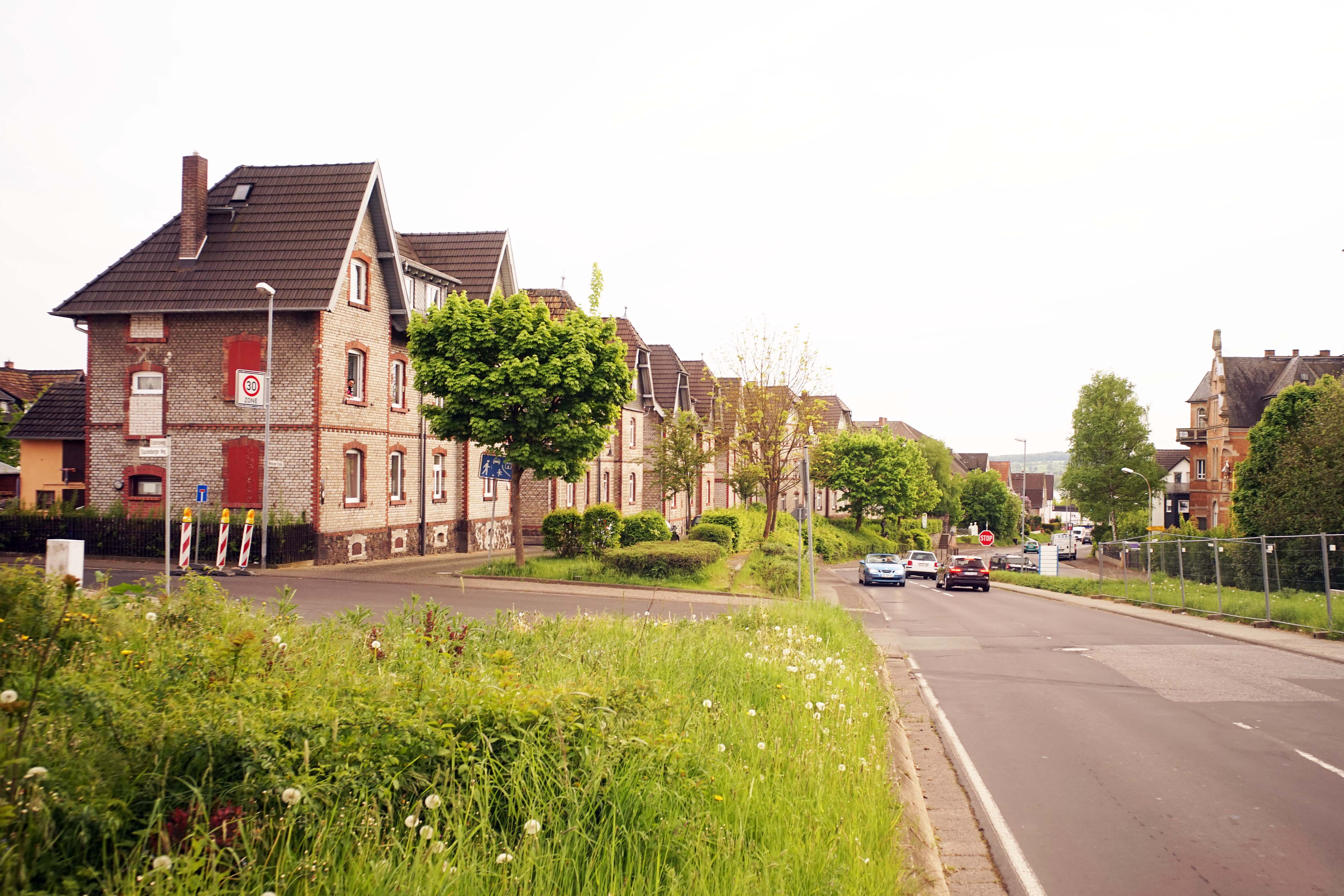

- Coat of arms

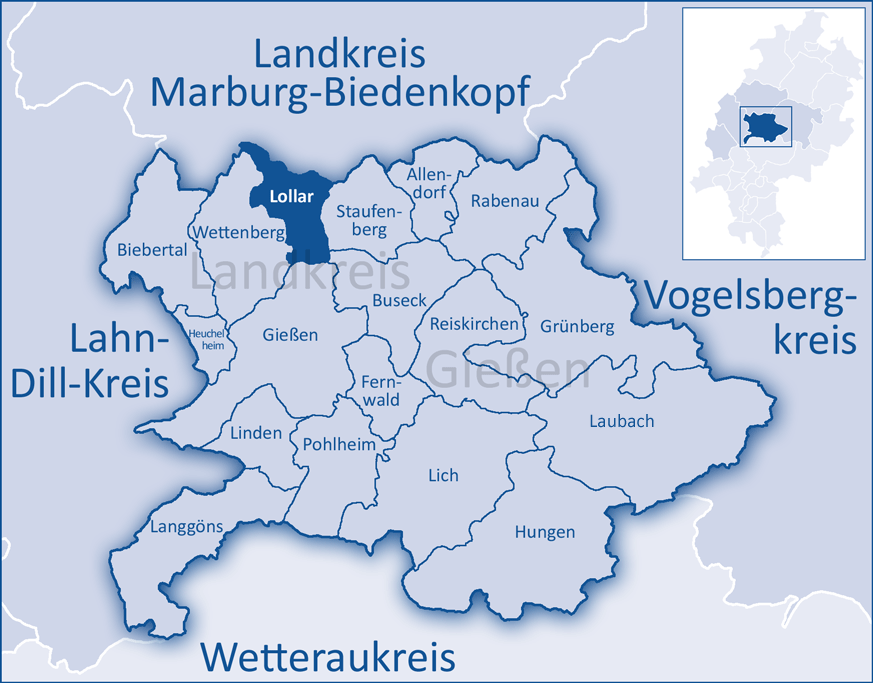
- Location of Lollar within Gießen district
- Interactive map of Lollar
- Location within Germany Location within Hesse
- Coordinates: 50°38′59″N 08°42′16″E
- Country: Germany
- State: Hesse
- Admin. region: Gießen
- District: Gießen

Government
  - Mayor (2022–28): Jan-Erik Dort (Ind.)

Area
  - Total: 21.39 km^{2} (8.26 sq mi)
- Elevation: 173 m (568 ft)

Population (2025-12-31)
  - Total: 10,170
  - Density: 475.5/km^{2} (1,231/sq mi)
- Time zone: UTC+01:00 (CET)
  - Summer (DST): UTC+02:00 (CEST)
- Postal codes: 35457
- Dialling codes: 06406
- Vehicle registration: GI
- Website: www.lollar.de

Lollar (German pronunciation: [ˈlɔlaʁ]) is a town in the district of Gießen, in Hesse, in west-central Germany. It is situated on the river Lahn, 7 km north of Gießen. The biggest production site of Bosch Thermotechnology is located in Lollar.

During World War II, in February 1945, the Germans established a Dulag transit camp for British and Commonwealth prisoners of war in the town, which was liberated by American troops on March 28, 1945.

The town is known for the chapel from Lollar, one of the oldest churches in Hessen. It was deconstructed in the 1970s and rebuilt in an open-air museum Hessenpark. A water feature, the Keulerbachbrunnen now stands where the church was.
