= Gladenbach Uplands =

Range of hills in Germany

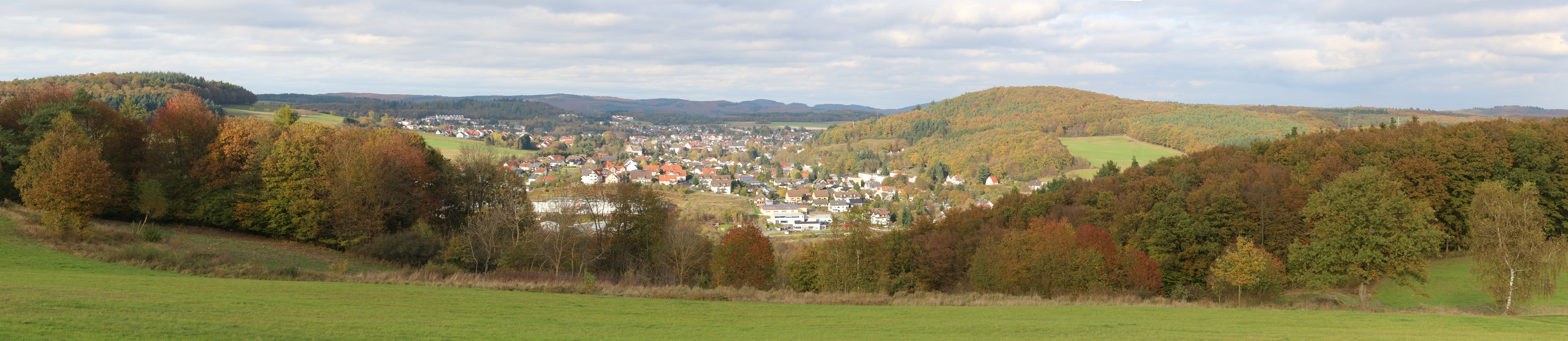
- View from the Dreisberg to the south of the village of Gladenbach

Highest point
- Peak: Angelburg
- Elevation: 609.4 m above NN

Dimensions
- Length: 80 km (50 mi)
- Area: 780 km^{2} (300 mi^{2})

Geography
- Location within Germany
- State(s): Middle Hesse (small elements also part of Wittgenstein Land, NRW)
- Range coordinates: 50°47′18″N 8°25′43″E
- Parent range: Westerwald, Rhenish Massif

Geology
- Orogeny: hills of the German Central Uplands

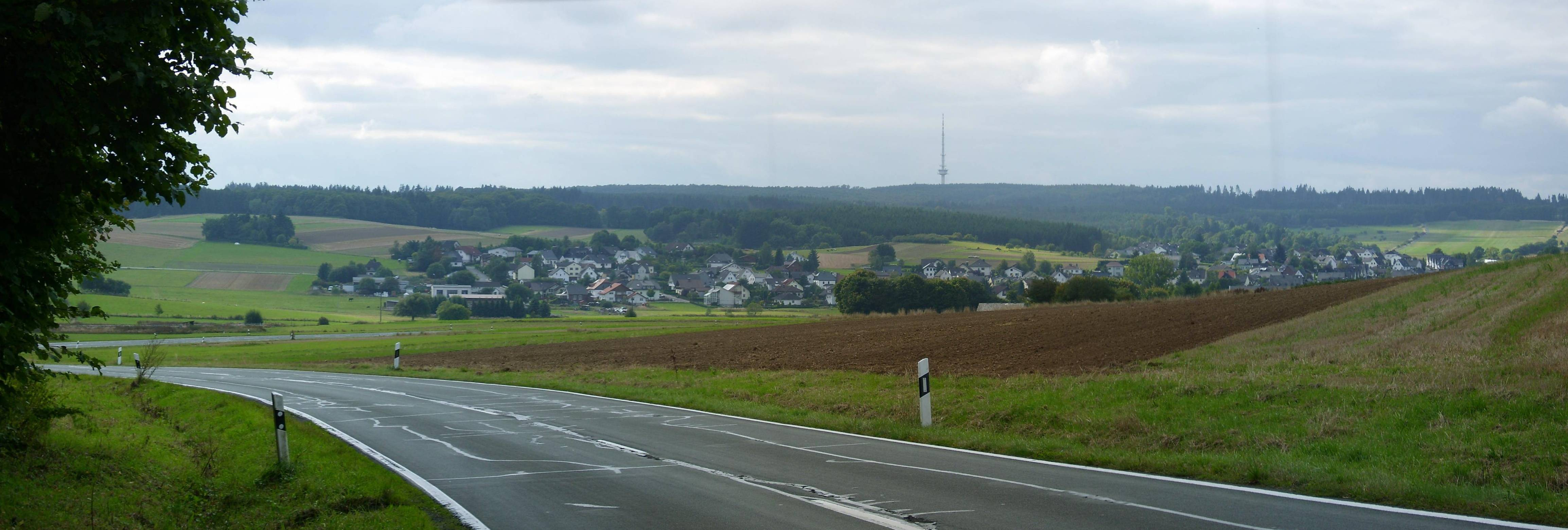
View of Bottenhorn in a small hollow (485 m) on the Bottenhorn Plateau. In the background is the Angelburg.

The Gladenbach Uplands (German: Gladenbacher Bergland), named after their central town of Gladenbach, is a range of hills up to 609 m high in the Rhine Massif in Germany, on the junction of the Rothaar Mountains (north and northwest), Westerwald (southwest), (Eastern) Hintertaunus (in the south) and West Hesse Highlands in the east. It lies in Central Hesse within the districts of Marburg-Biedenkopf, Lahn-Dill and Gießen within the so-called Lahn-Dill-(Dietzhölze-) loop. Small parts of the Upper Lahn Valley in the northwest belong, together with the town of Bad Laasphe, also to the district of Siegen-Wittgenstein, North Rhine-Westphalia.

The Gladenbach Uplands are geographical unit 320 which is part of the natural region 32, the Westerwald, in Germany's system of natural regions. The Gladenbach Highlands is largely coextensive with the Lahn-Dill Uplands Nature Park which extends further west, however, but is somewhat less extensive in the southeast and whose boundaries tend to line up with those of the sponsoring municipalities. In addition, significant areas belong to the historical Hessian Hinterland, which is why the two named articles refer to one another, as far as regional associations, culture and history are concerned. Geology and mining will be largely covered in the article on the Lahn-Dill Region

== Location and boundaries ==
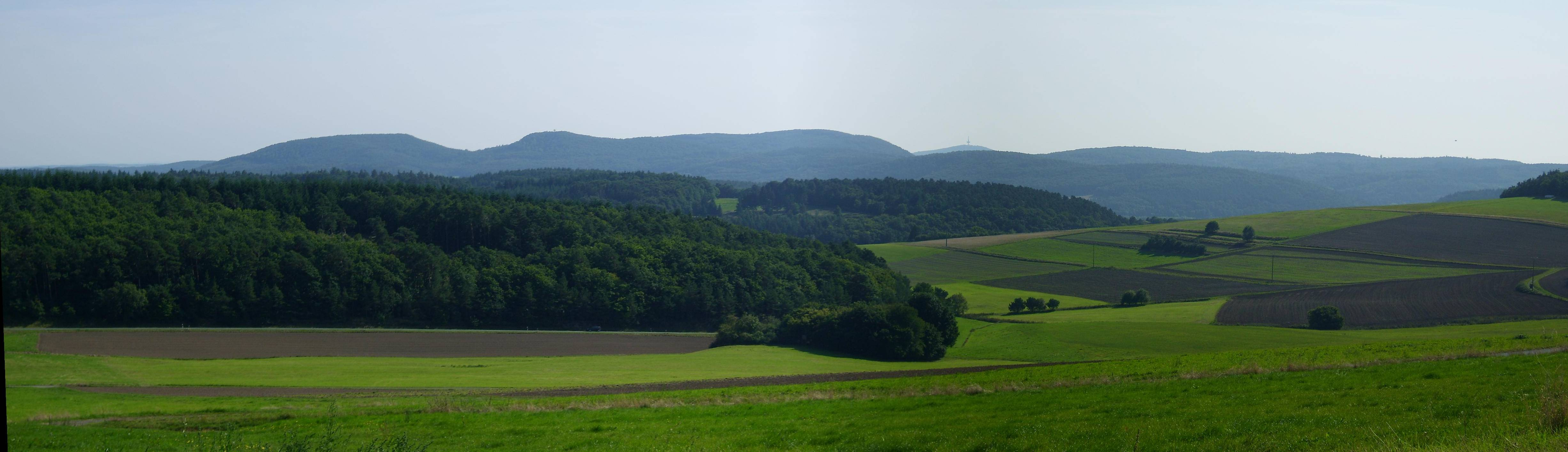
The prominent heights on the eastern edge of the natural region of Zollbuche seen from the north (from right up to the centre): the Dreisberg (448 m), Koppe (454 m) and Hemmerich (470 m). Right of centre the distant Dünsberg (498 m) may be made out, whilst the Zollbuche ridge transitions on the right into the Bad Endbach Plateau (up to 488 m).

On the rivers Lahn and Dill the following towns - clockwise from the north - border the Gladenbach Uplands:

- Bad Laasphe (northwest)
- Biedenkopf (north)
- Western suburbs of Marburg (northeast)
- Lollar (southeast)
- Gießen (southeast)
- Wetzlar (south)
- Herborn (southwest)
- Dillenburg (west)

The northwest transitions to the Rothaar Mountains are comparatively fluid. Here the watershed between the Lahn tributaries of the Banfe and Perf define the boundary.

== Rivers and streams ==
The natural regions mentioned above are generally divided between the catchment areas of the der Lahn and Dill tributaries and the landscapes separated by these rivers.

The most important watercourses, in addition to the boundary rivers of the Lahn, Dill and Dietzhölze – are the Aar, the Salzböde, the Perf and Allna.

The following rivers and streams are sorted in clockwise order i.e. down the Lahn and up the Dill, beginning with the upper reaches of the Lahn in the north and cover a catchment area of over 20 km^{2}:
(the natural regions are linked in the column of their most important river!)

→ to full list

| Name | Parent river | Length [km] | Catchment- area [km^{2}] | Drains into [l/s] | Mouth elevation [m above NN] | Natural regions (heading downstream) | Roads | DGKZ |
|---|---|---|---|---|---|---|---|---|
| Diete | Perf (l) | 8,8 | 24,64 | | 310 | Breidenbach Bottom | B 253 | 25814–6 |
| Gansbach | Perf (l) | 11,1 | 23,17 | | 349 | Bottenhorn Plateaux, Breidenbach Bottom | L 3042 | 25814–2 |
| Perf | Lahn (r) | 20,0 | 113,13 | 1776 | 285 | Bottenhorn Plateaux, Breidenbach Bottom | L 3049, B 253 | 258–14 |
| Dautphe | Lahn (r) | 8,8 | 41,81 | 533 | 245 | Bottenhorn Plateaux, Upper Lahn Valley | B 453 | 258–16 |
| Elnhauser Wasser | Ohe (l) | 5,9 | 24,25 | 171 | 195 | Elnhausen-Michelbach Basin | | 258326–6 |
| Ohe | Allna (l) | 11,5 | 44,28 | 337 | 195 | Damshäuser Kuppen, Elnhausen-Michelbach Basin | L 3387 | 25832–6 |
| Allna | Lahn (r) | 19,1 | 92,02 | 665 | 172 | Damshäuser Kuppen, Elnhausen-Michelbach Basin | L 3387 | 258–32 |
| Wenkbach | Lahn (r) | 7,2 | 20,77 | 107 | 168 | Salzböde Valley, Marburger Lahn Valley Basin | | 258–332 |
| Salzböde | Lahn (r) | 27,6 | 137,85 | 1322 | 164 | Zollbuche, Salzböde Valley, Krofdorf-Königsberg Forest, Marburger Lahn Valley Basin | L 3050, B 255, L 3048 | 258–34 |
| Vers | Salzböde (r) | 8,4 | 42,55 | | 188 | Salzböde Valley | L 3061 | 25834–8 |
| Bieber | Lahn (r) | 13,5 | 34,68 | 217 | 155 | Krofdorf-Königsberg Forest, Gießen Lahn Valley Basin | L 3474, L 3286 | 258–394 |
| Lemp | Dill (l) | 11,7 | 34,97 | 274 | 170 | Krofdorf-Königsberg Forest, Krofdorf-Königsberger/Hörre | L 3052 | 2584–92 |
| Aar | Dill (l) | 20,6 | 148,76 | 1602 | 210 | Niederweidbach Basin, Hörre/Schelde Forest, Lower Dill Valley | B 255 | 2584–6 |
| Siegbach | Aar (r) | 12,2 | 28,67 | | 260 | Bottenhorn Plateaux, Zollbuche | / L 3050, / L 3049 | 25846–6 |
| Schelde | Dill (l) | 12,0 | 35,03 | 426 | 221 | Schelde Forest | L 3042 | 2584–56 |
| Dietzhölze | Dill (l) | 23,7 | 88,44 | 1431 | 233 | Rothaar Mountains, Upper Dill Valley | B 253 | 2584–4 |

The outer boundary of the Gladenbach Uplands is formed by the Lahn and Dill accompanied in the north (upper reaches of the Lahn) by the B 62, in the east by the B 3 Marburg-Gießen (mostly autobahn-like, clearly external in the Marburg area), in the east, south of the B 49 Gießen-Wetzlar (mostly autobahn-like) and in the southwest (lower reaches of the Dill) by the A 45. The Bundesstraße 253 Dillenburg-Biedenkopf (see above) roughly closes the remaining gap.

== Waterbodies ==
The most important reservoir in the Gladenbach Uplands is the Aartalsee (57 ha, 270 m above NN) in the Niederweidbach Basin, followed by the Perf Reservoir (18 ha, 301 m) in the Breidenbach Bottom (Breidenbach Bottom).

== Hills ==
The hills of the Gladenbach Uplands, arranged by ridge or natural region, include the following:
(Location of the natural regions with the Gladenbach Uplands and location of the hills within the natural region)

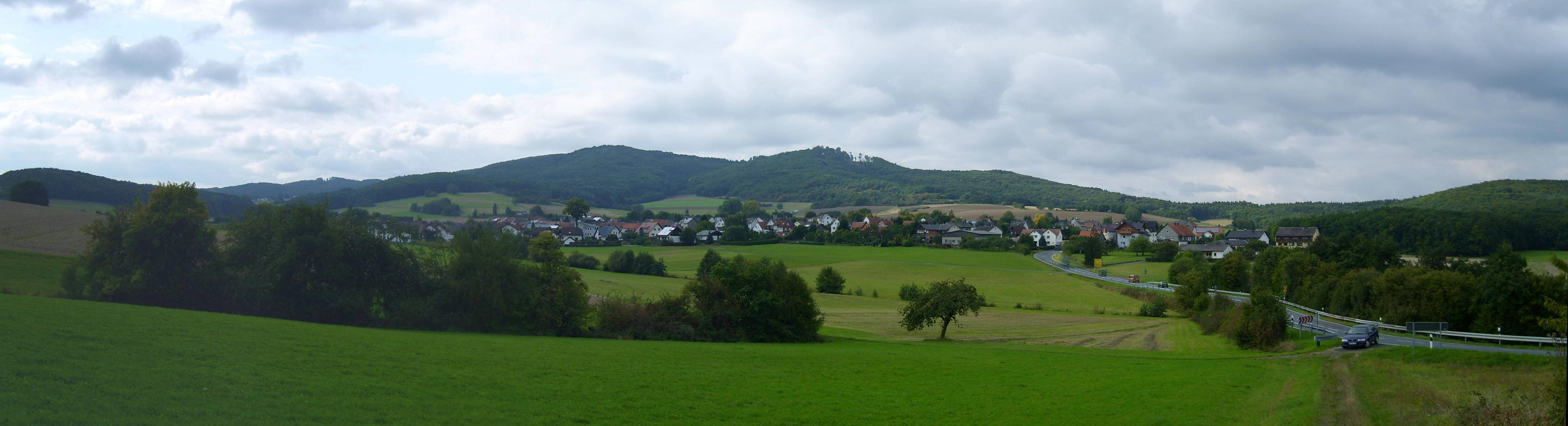
The Daubhaus (552 m, centre left) and the Allberg (528 m) at the far eastern edge of the Bottenhorn Plateaux. In the foreground is the Gladenbach village of Runzhausen

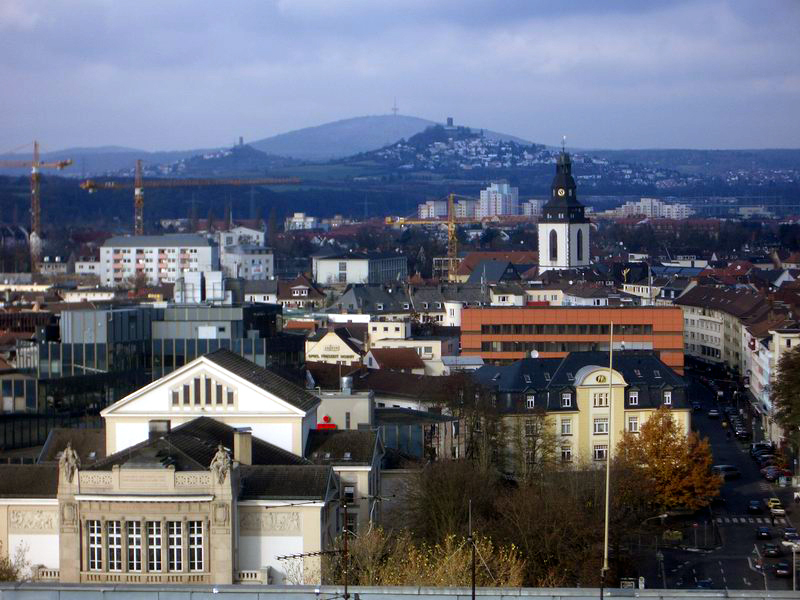
View looking past Gießen and the castles of Vetzberg (left) and Gleiberg (right) to the 498 m high Dünsberg

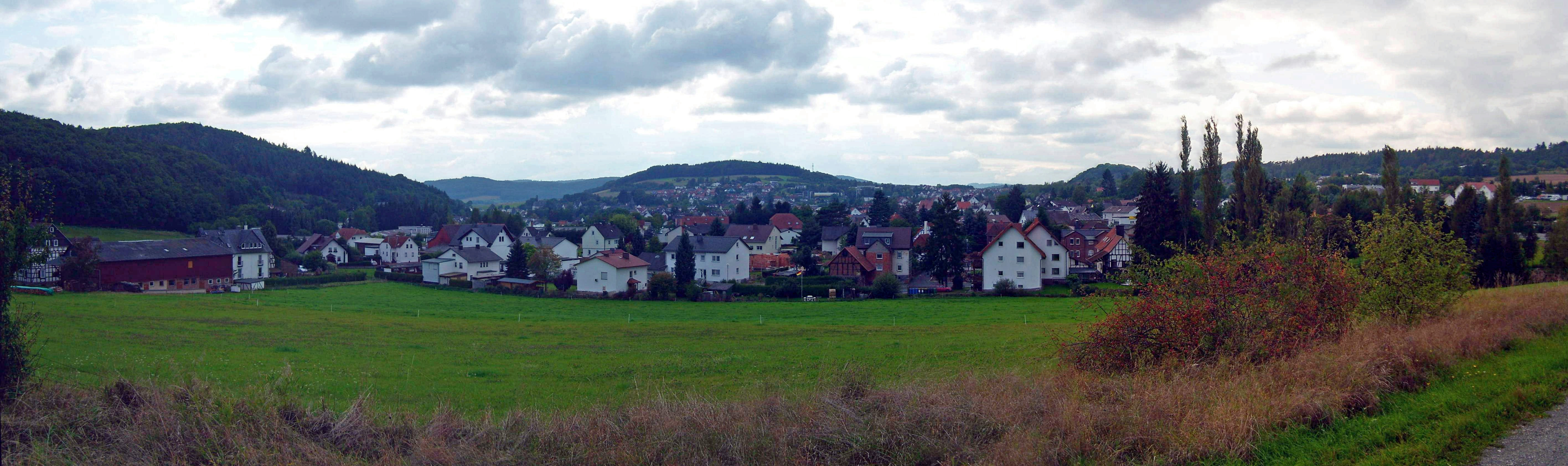
View from the B 255 of Gladenbach. Centre rear: the 357 m high Lammerich; left: northern foot of the 361 m high Kirchberg.

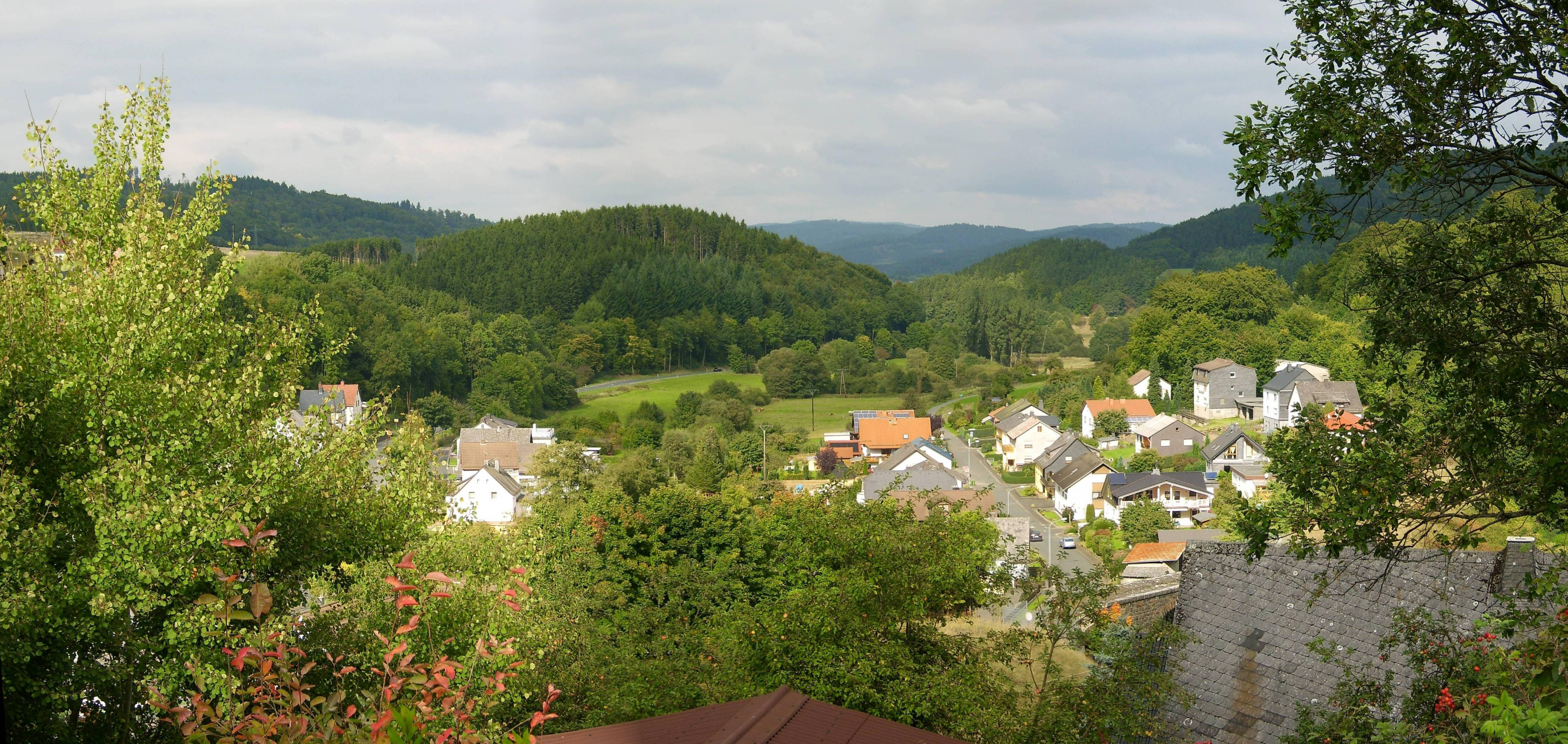
The lower Gansbach Valley near Frechenhausen. Background: the Schwarzenberg (Breidenbach Grund) and the Sackpfeife.

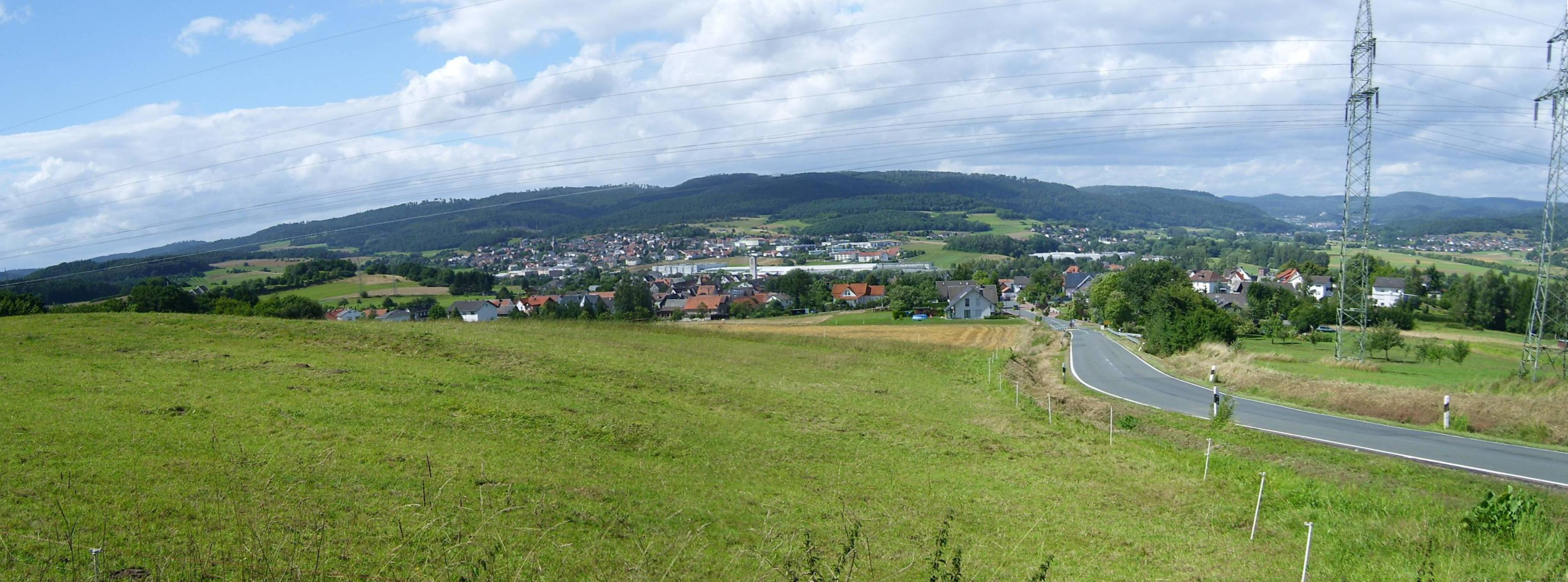
The 533 m high Schwarzenberg spurs of Nimerich and Friedensdorf. Rear right: the Biedenkopf and the 631 m high Sackpfeife spur of Hainpracht

- Bottenhorn Plateaux - northwest of the centre
  - Angelburg (609 m) – west of the centre; occasionally counted as part of the Schelde Forest
    - Schmittgrund (590 m) – southern spur of the Angelburg, occasionally counted as part of the Schelde Forest
  - Mattenberg (578 m) – north west
  - Kurzbeul (566 m) – extreme west
  - Würgeloh (563,9 m) north Hartenrod / Bad Endbach
  - Madche (560 m) – northwest
  - Daubhaus (551,8 m) – extreme east, north of Rachelshausen
    - Allberg (528 m) – northeast of the Daubhaus
    - Hünstein (504 m) – north of the Allberg; not really an independent summit, but has an observation tower; gives its name to Holzhausen am Hünstein
  - Bolzeberg (520 m) – extreme northeast
  - Steffenberg (489 m) – extreme (west) north, gives its name to the municipality of Steffenberg
- Schelde Forest (in the narrow sense) – west
  - Eschenburg (590 m NN) – north, above the Dietzhölze Valley (which lies to the northwest)
  - Hohe Koppe (540.2 m) – northeast
  - Stockseite (516 m) – east
- Breidenbach Bottom – extreme north(west)
  - Hemmerichskopf (562 m) – western boundary with the Rothaar Mountains
  - Schwarzenberg (561 m) – northeast; centre of a large contiguous forest area southwest of Biedenkopf and east of Breidenbach
    - Hachenberg (552 m) – northern subpeak
    - Nimerich (533 m) – southeastern subpeak; highest point in the municipality of Dautphetal
  - Schadenberg (545 m) – southwest of the centre
  - Galgenberg (541 m) – extreme southwest
  - Entenberg (535 m) – northwestern boundary to the Rothaar Mountains
- Zollbuche – centre
  - Hirschhohl (503 m) – northwest boundary with the plateaux
  - Schönscheid (498 m) – west, northwest Günterod
  - Bad Endbacher Platte (up to 488 m) – centre
  - Hemmerich (475.7 m) – east; forms with Koppe and Dreisberg the eastern trio of hills of the Gladenbach Uplands
    - Koppe (454 m) – with observation tower; near Gladenbach-Erdhausen
    - Dreisberg (448 m)
- Damshäuser Kuppen – northeast
  - Rimberg (498 m) – east north; with observation tower
  - Kappe (494 m) – west north
  - Schweinskopf (472 m) – north west, near Dautphetal-Herzhausen
  - Eichelhardt (465 m) – northwest
  - Dusenberg (457 m) – extreme west, near Dautphetal-Herzhausen
  - Hornberg (451 m) – extreme northwest
  - Hungert (412 m) – extreme northeast; pyramidal Kuppe on the boundary with the Marburg Ridge
  - Auersberg (385 m) – east, between Elnhausen, Nesselbrunn and Dilschhausen
  - Donnerberg (370 m) – southeast, northeast of Gladenbach
- Krofdorf-Königsberg Forest – south and southeast
  - Dünsberg (498 m) – east centre; volcanic singularity with Celtic excavation sites, TV transmission tower and observation tower
  - Altenberg (442 m) – northwest centre, observation tower
  - Ramsberg (ca. 435 m) – north; Hohensolms Castle
  - Forst Krofdorf (up to 357 m) – east; large contiguous forest region that links the Dünsberg to the east with the Lahn Valley
  - Königsstuhl (348 m) – south; one of the southernmost hills of the Gladenbach Uplands
- Hörre – southwest
  - Alteburg (445 m) – in the centre
  - Roßberg (392 m) – northeast, south of Bischoffen
  - Koppe (354 m) – south, west of Kölschhausen
- Niederweidbach Basin – south of the centre
  - Bergwald (im east up to 392 m) – east of the centre
- Salzböde Valley – northeast, east and southeast of the centre
  - Kirchberg (362 m) – north, east of Gladenbach
  - Lammerich (357 m) – north, southwest of Gladenbach
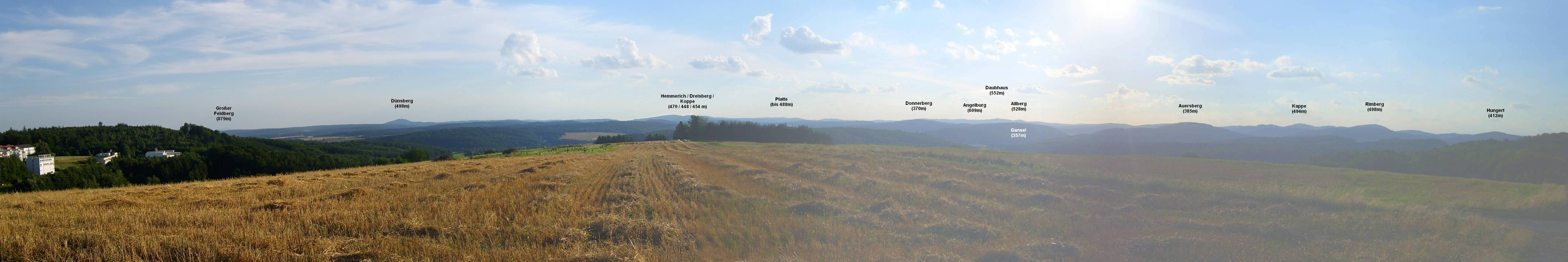
View from the Hasenkopf looking west to the Tannenberg (left), the Großer Feldberg and the hills of the Gladenbach Uplands including the Dünsberg, Hemmerich, Angelburg, Daubhaus and Rimberg

== Literature ==
- Meynen, Emil (ed.): Handbuch der naturräumlichen Gliederung Deutschlands. Selbstverlag der Bundesanstalt für Landeskunde, Remagen, 1953-1962 (Part 1, contains issues 1–5), ISBN B0000BJ19E
- Meynen, Emil (ed.): Handbuch der naturräumlichen Gliederung Deutschlands. Selbstverlag der Bundesanstalt für Landeskunde, Remagen, 1959-1962 (Part 2, contains issues 6–9), ISBN B0000BJ19F
