= Dagobertshausen =

- Borough of Marburg
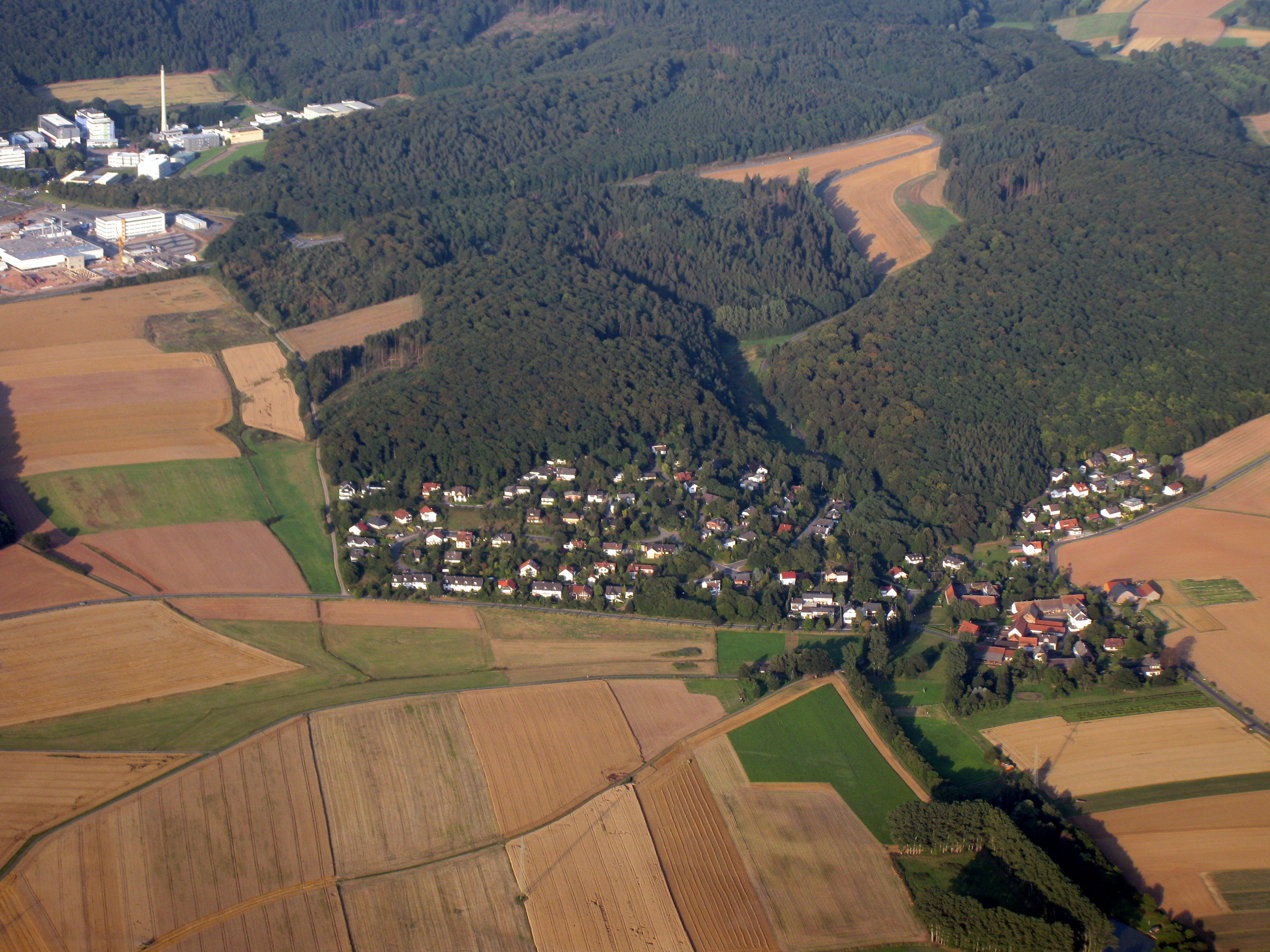

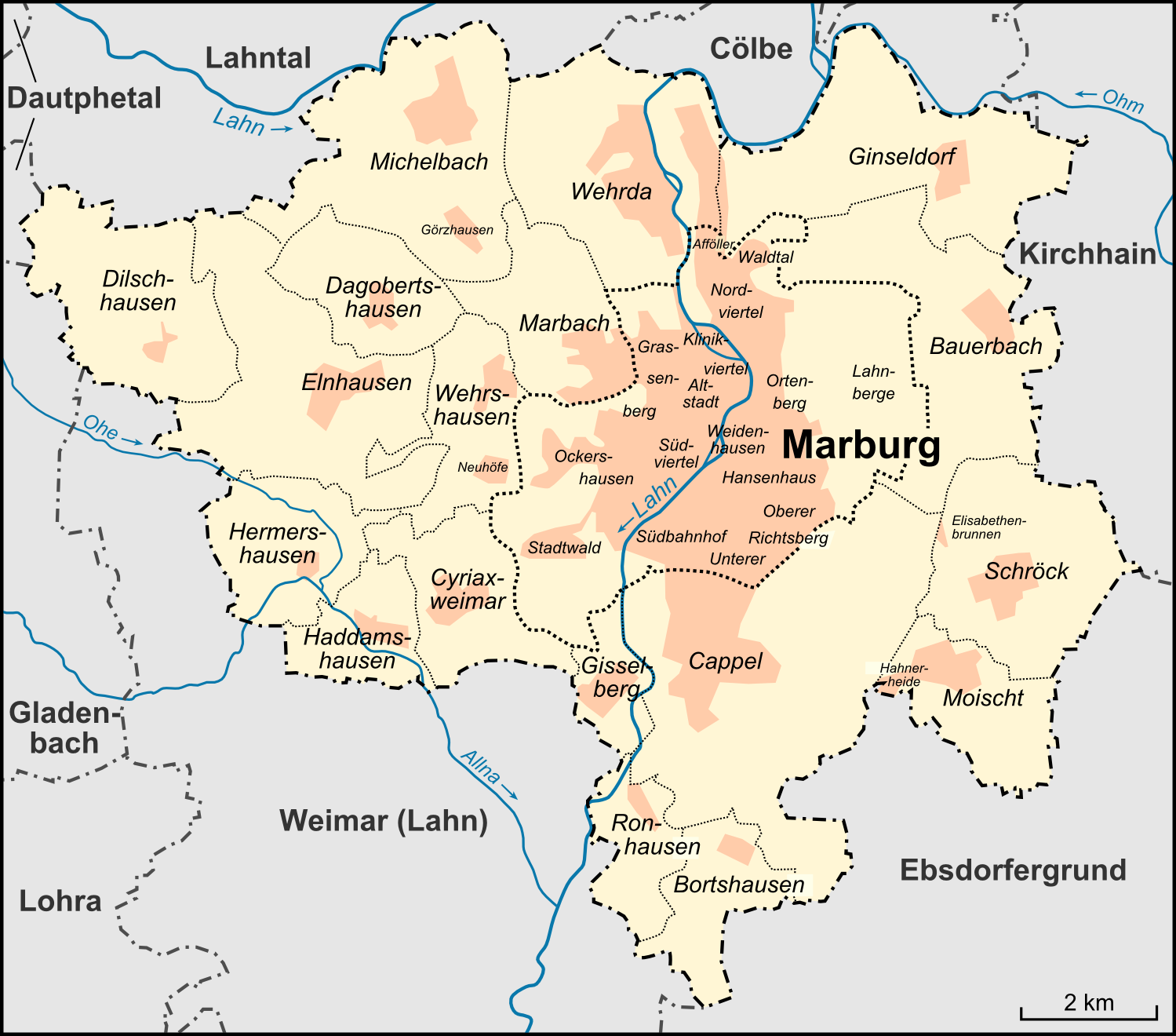
- Stadtteile of Marburg
- Interactive map of Dagobertshausen
- Location within Germany Location within Hesse
- Coordinates: 50°49′12″N 8°42′11″E
- Country: Germany
- State: Hesse
- District: Marburg-Biedenkopf
- City: Marburg

Area
  - Total: 3.53 km^{2} (1.36 sq mi)
- Elevation: 248–290 m (814–951 ft)

Population (2019-12-31)
  - Total: 359
  - Density: 102/km^{2} (263/sq mi)
- Time zone: UTC+01:00 (CET)
  - Summer (DST): UTC+02:00 (CEST)
- Postal codes: 35041
- Dialling codes: 06421

Dagobertshausen is a borough (Ortsbezirk) of Marburg in Hesse.

Dagobertshausen is 5 km from Marburg on the west side of the Marburg ridge: the nearest villages are Elnhausen (1 km south-west) and Michelbach (3 km north-north-east).

== Cultural and leisure activities ==
The Event- und Kulturscheune Dagobertshausen is an arts venue housed in the converted barn of the Scherer Hof farm, which is used for film shows, concerts, banquets and other cultural events.

The Reitsportanlage Dagobertshausen is an equestrian centre that hosts national and international horse shows and showjumping events.

The Restaurant Waldschlösschen is a star restaurant where rustic food is preferred.
