= Altenberg (Hohenahr) =

Hill in Germany

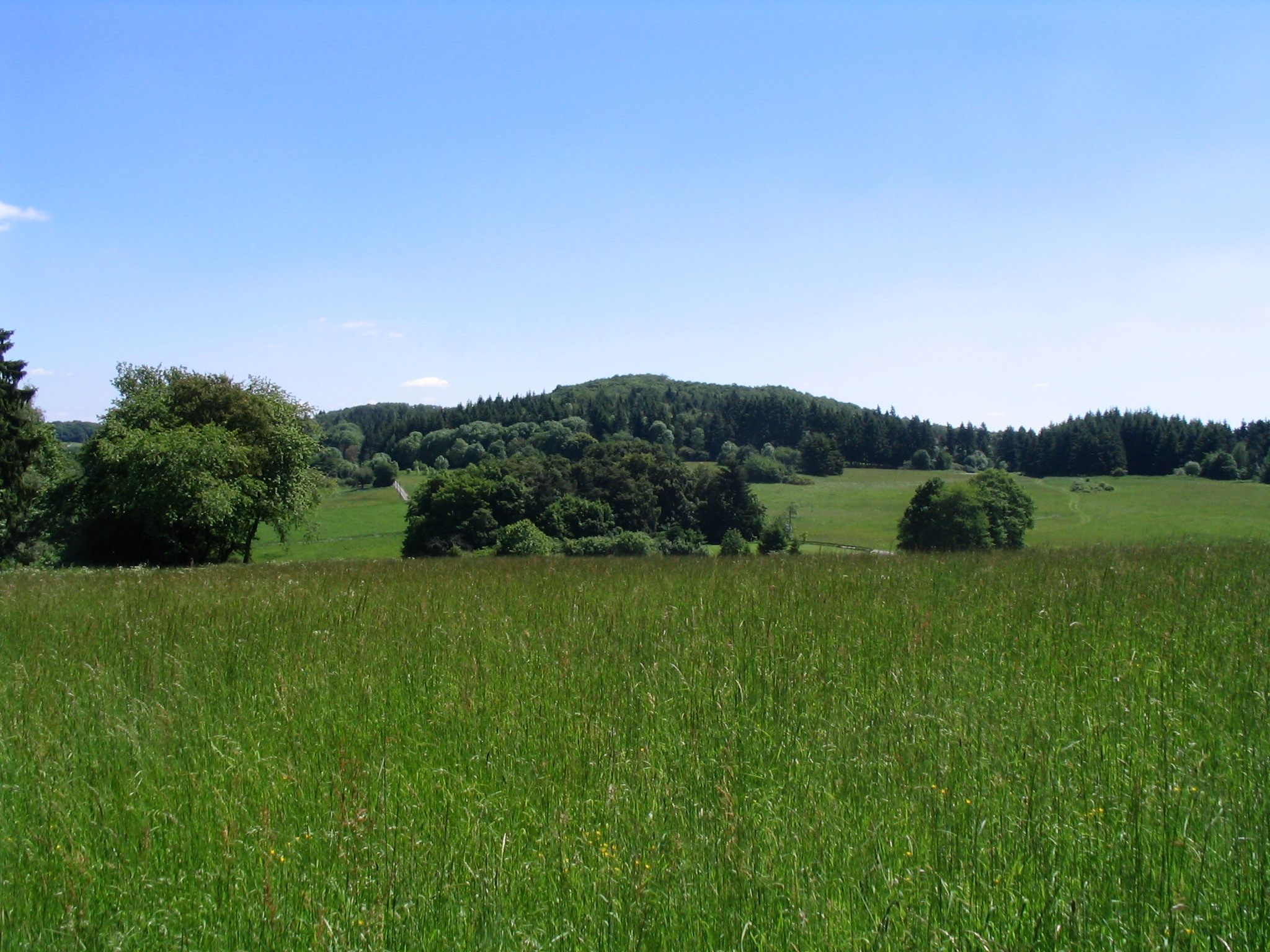

Highest point
- Elevation: 4,422 m (14,508 ft)
- Coordinates: 50°38′13″N 8°31′01″E

Geography
- Location within Hesse
- Location: Lahn-Dill-Kreis, Hesse, Germany

The Altenberg (German pronunciation: [ˈaltn̩ˌbɛʁk]) is a hill in Hesse, Germany. With 442,2 meters over the NHN, it is the tallest hill of the Hohenahr commune in the Gladenbacher Uplands.

It is located 1.5 km south of the district of de:Hohensolms and 1.4 km southwest of Königsberg, a district of Biebertal. In the Middle Ages, the hill was the site of Alt-Hohensolms Castle, of which only remnants of the ramparts and moats remain today.

It is located next to the L3053 road.

== History ==
In 1323 Hohensolms Castle on the Altenberg was mentioned for the first time. It secured the interests of the Counts of Solms-Burgsolms and Solms-Braunfels in the northern part of their county against the Landgrave of Hesse and the Solms-Königsberg line allied with him. The complex was destroyed twice during armed conflicts, in which the imperial city Wetzlar was also involved. After the destruction in 1349, the site was abandoned by imperial order, and the castle was moved to the neighbouring Ramsberg, where it still stands today.

== Observation tower ==
Prince Ferdinand of Solms-Hohensolms-Lich had his seat in the 1830s at the nearby castle Hohensolms, which is about 5m and can still be climbed today. In good weather, it generally offers a distant view from the Wetterau in the south to the Taunus in the southwest, the Westerwald in the west to the Schelderwald. in the northwest. To the north or east, one could see Hohensolms Castle and the Dünsberg. However, the view is now so limited by the regrowth of the surrounding trees that all around you can see only the forest. Nevertheless, the summit area with its special atmosphere and resting places is a worthwhile destination for hikers.
