= Feiselberg =

Mountain in Germany

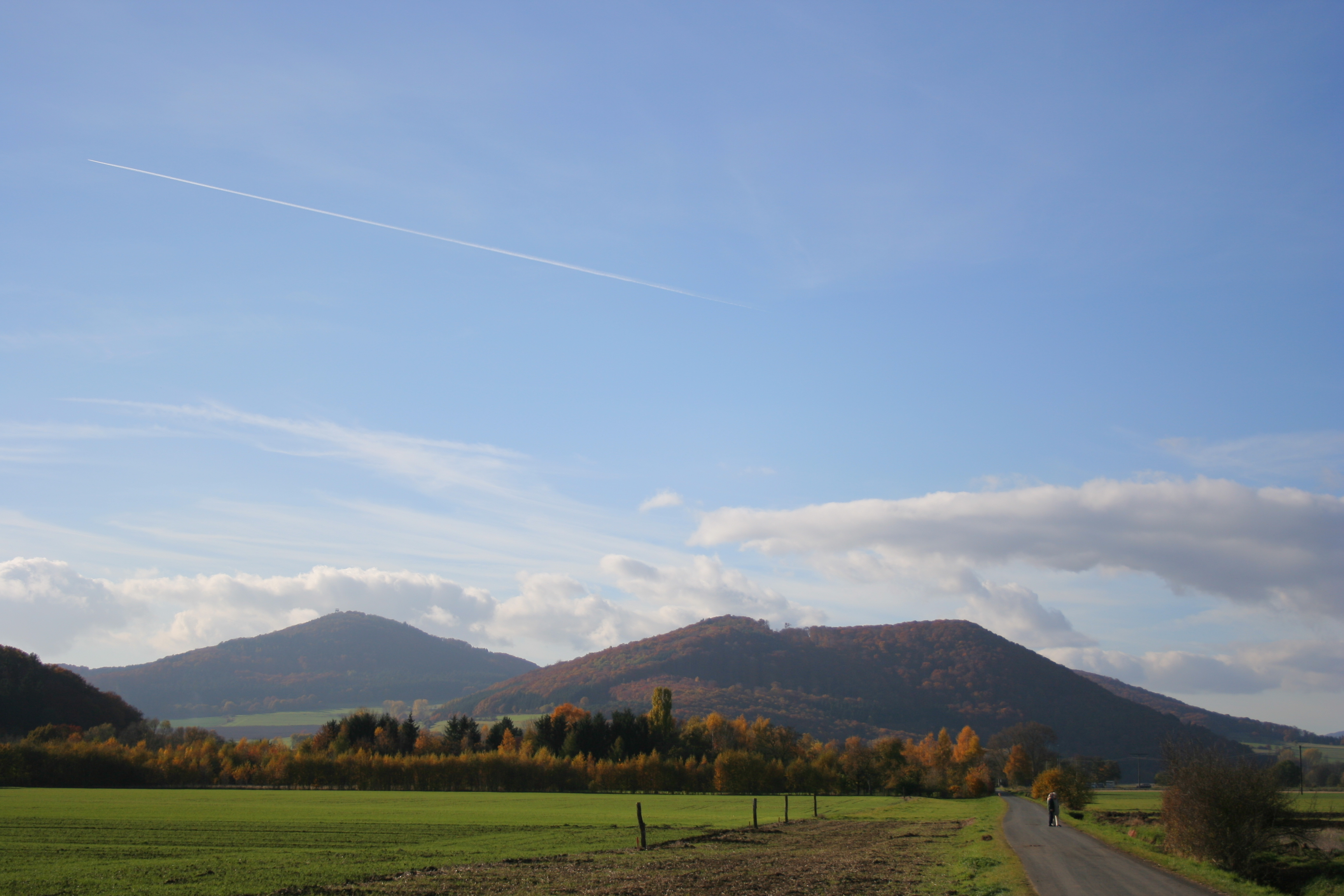
- Feiselberg (right) and Rimberg (left); the Roßberg is hidden by the Feiselberg

Highest point
- Elevation: 413 m (1,355 ft)
- Prominence: 61 m (200 ft)
- Coordinates: 50°50′54″N 8°38′33″E

Geography
- Location: Hesse, Germany

Feiselberg is a mountain of Gladenbach Uplands near Caldern, Landkreis Marburg-Biedenkopf, Hesse, Germany.
