= Angelburg (hill) =

Hill in Hesse, Germany

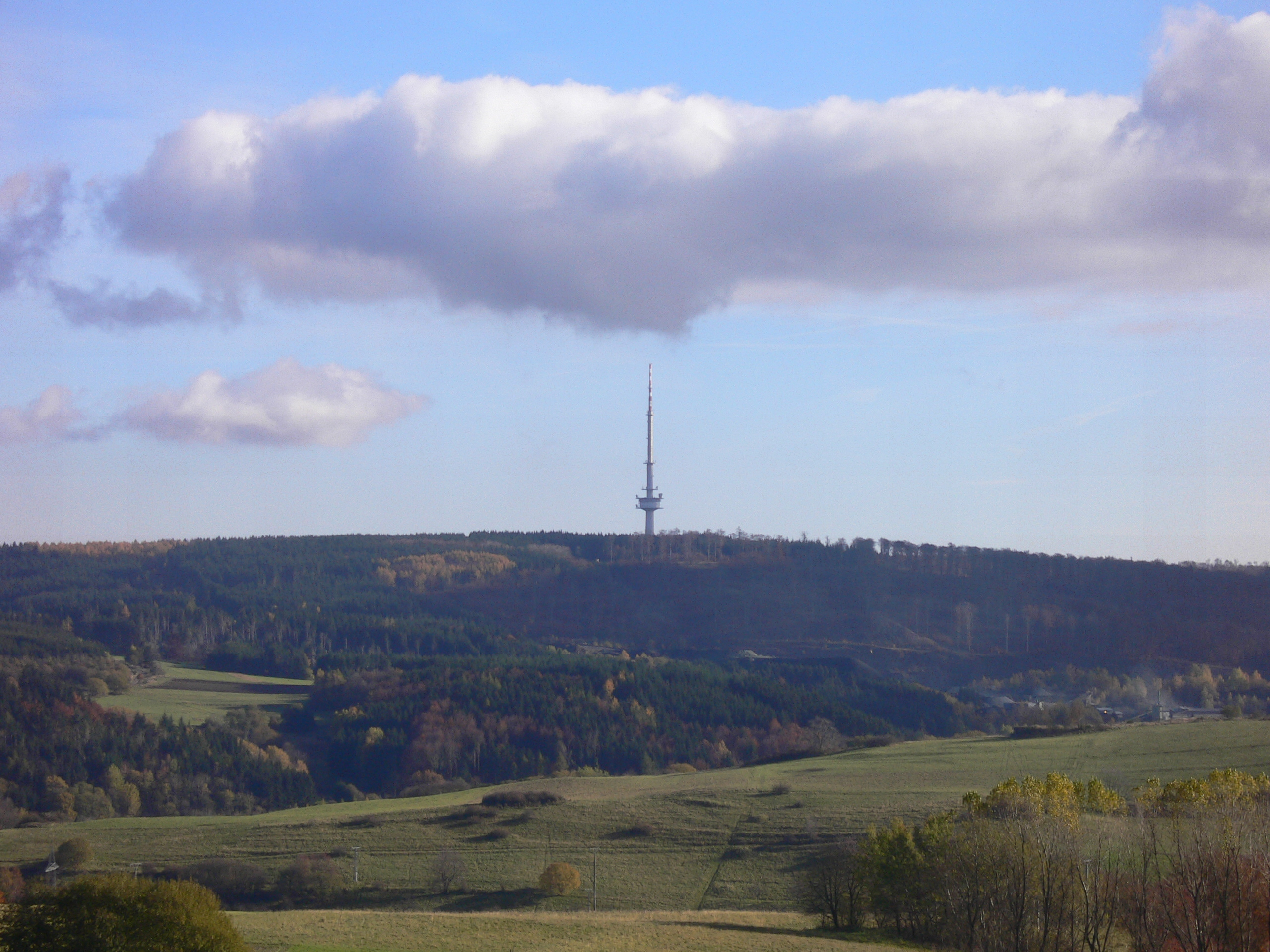

Highest point
- Elevation: 609 m (1,998 ft)
- Prominence: 180 m (590 ft)
- Parent peak: 610 m, Eichholzkopf (Rothaargebirge)
- Coordinates: 50°47′18″N 8°25′44″E

Geography
- Location within Hesse
- Location: Hesse, Germany
- Parent range: Gladenbach Uplands

The Angelburg is a hill in Hesse, Germany. At an elevation of 609 metres above sea level, its peak is located in Lahn-Dill-Kreis district, near the local centre of Hirzenhain-Bahnhof, which is part of Eschenburg.
