= Walgerbach =

River in Germany

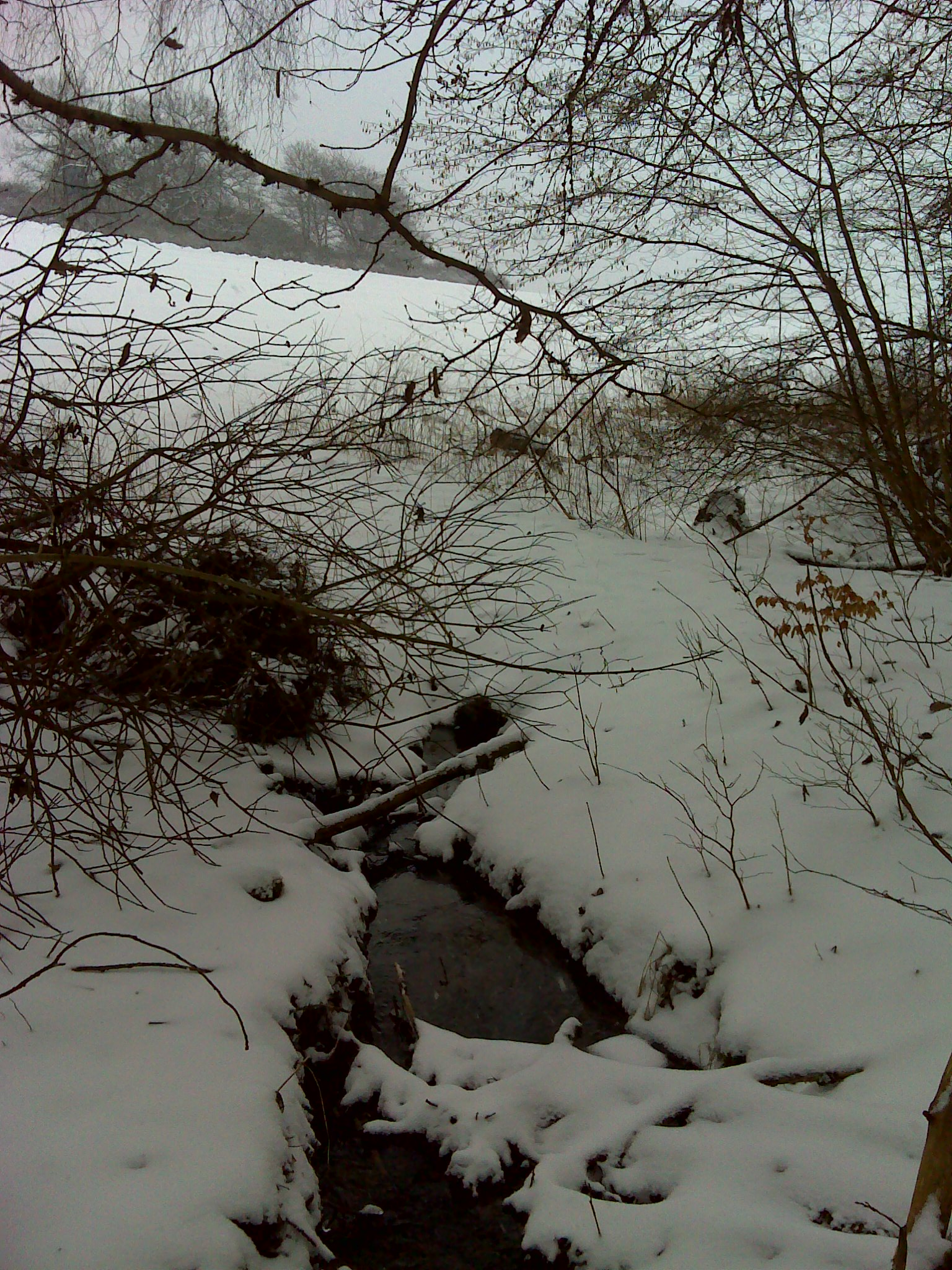

Location
- Country: Germany
- State: Hesse

Physical characteristics
- Mouth
  - location: Wenkbach
  - coordinates: 50.7260°N 8.7171°E
- Length: 7.8 km (4.8 mi)

Basin features
- Progression: Wenkbach→ Lahn→ Rhine→ North Sea

The Walgerbach is a river of district Marburg-Biedenkopf in Hesse, Germany. It flows into the Wenkbach near Niederwalgern.

== See also ==
- List of rivers of Hesse
