= Rimberg (Hinterland) =

Mountain in Germany

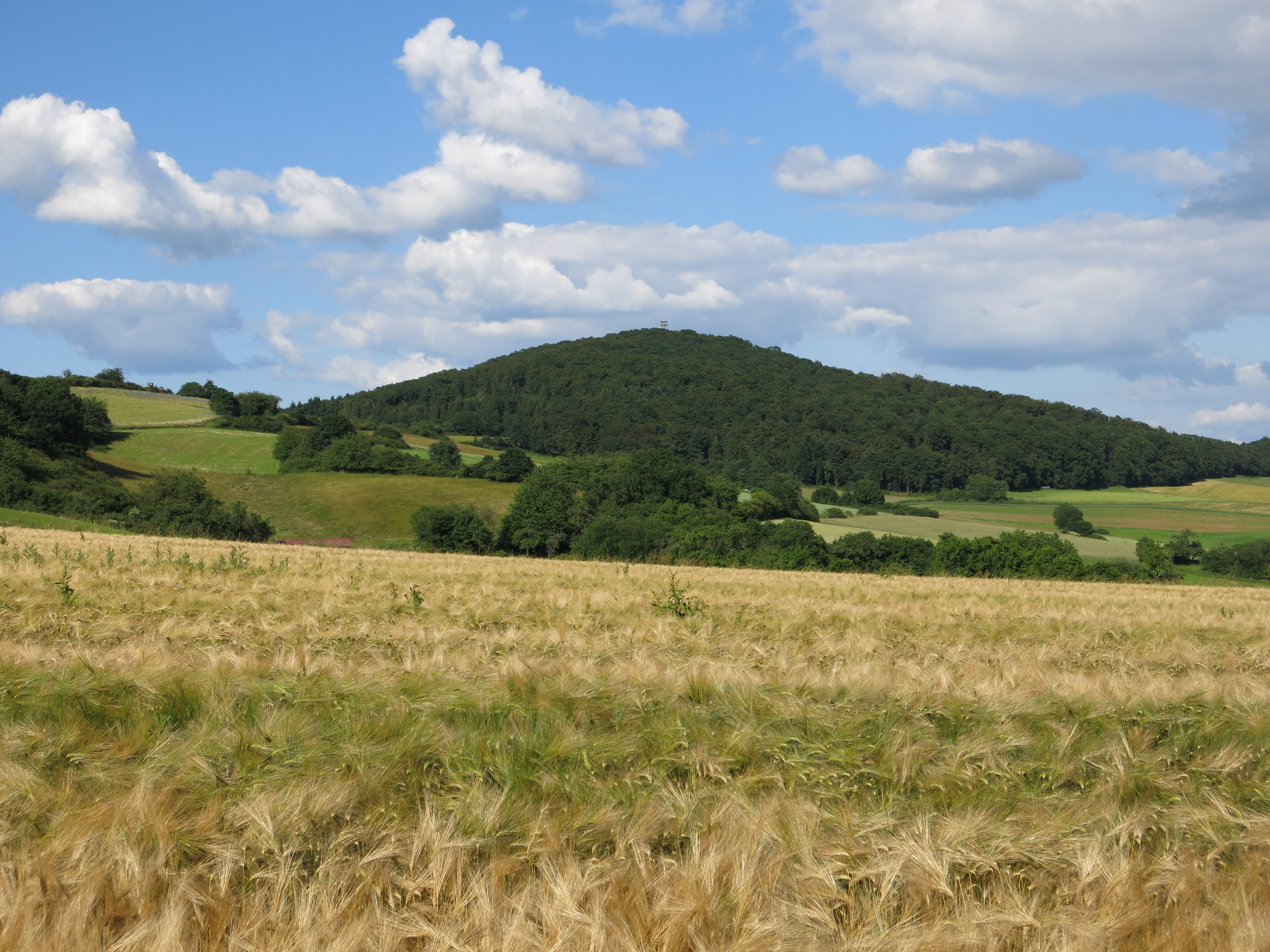
- Rimberg, seen from the southwest

Highest point
- Elevation: 497.1 m (1,631 ft)
- Coordinates: 50°50′30″N 8°37′46″E

Geography
- Location: Hesse, Germany

The Rimberg is a mountain in Hesse, Germany; at 497.1 meter high, in the Gladenbach Uplands, in the Marburg-Biedenkopf district. On top of it is the Rimbergturm, an lookout tower.

The Rimberg's north-easterly neighbour is the Feiselberg, which merges to the valley of the Lahn near Caldern.

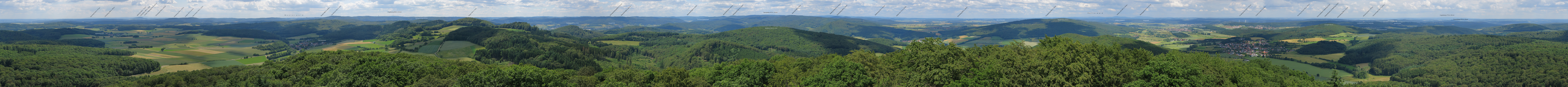
Panoramic view (360°) from the lookout-tower

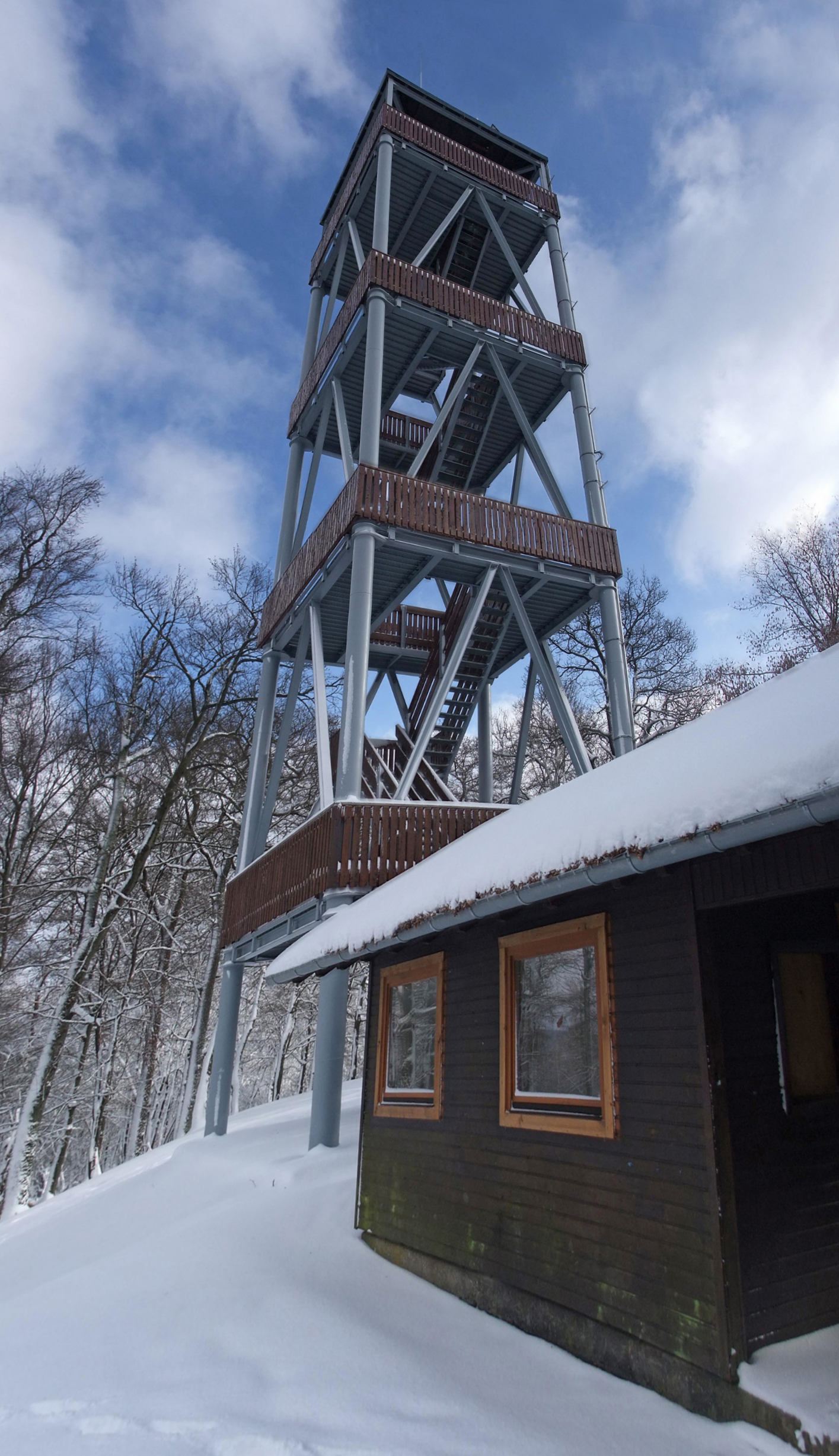
Rimbergturm
