= Gansbach (river) =

River in Germany

Location
- Country: Germany
- State: Hesse

Physical characteristics
- Mouth
  - location: Perf
  - coordinates: 50.8414°N 8.4694°E
- Length: 11.1 km (6.9 mi)

Basin features
- Progression: Perf→ Lahn→ Rhine→ North Sea

Gansbach is a river of Hesse, Germany. It flows into the Perf in Niedereisenhausen.

== See also ==
- List of rivers of Hesse
