= Wenkbach (Lahn) =

River in Hesse, Germany

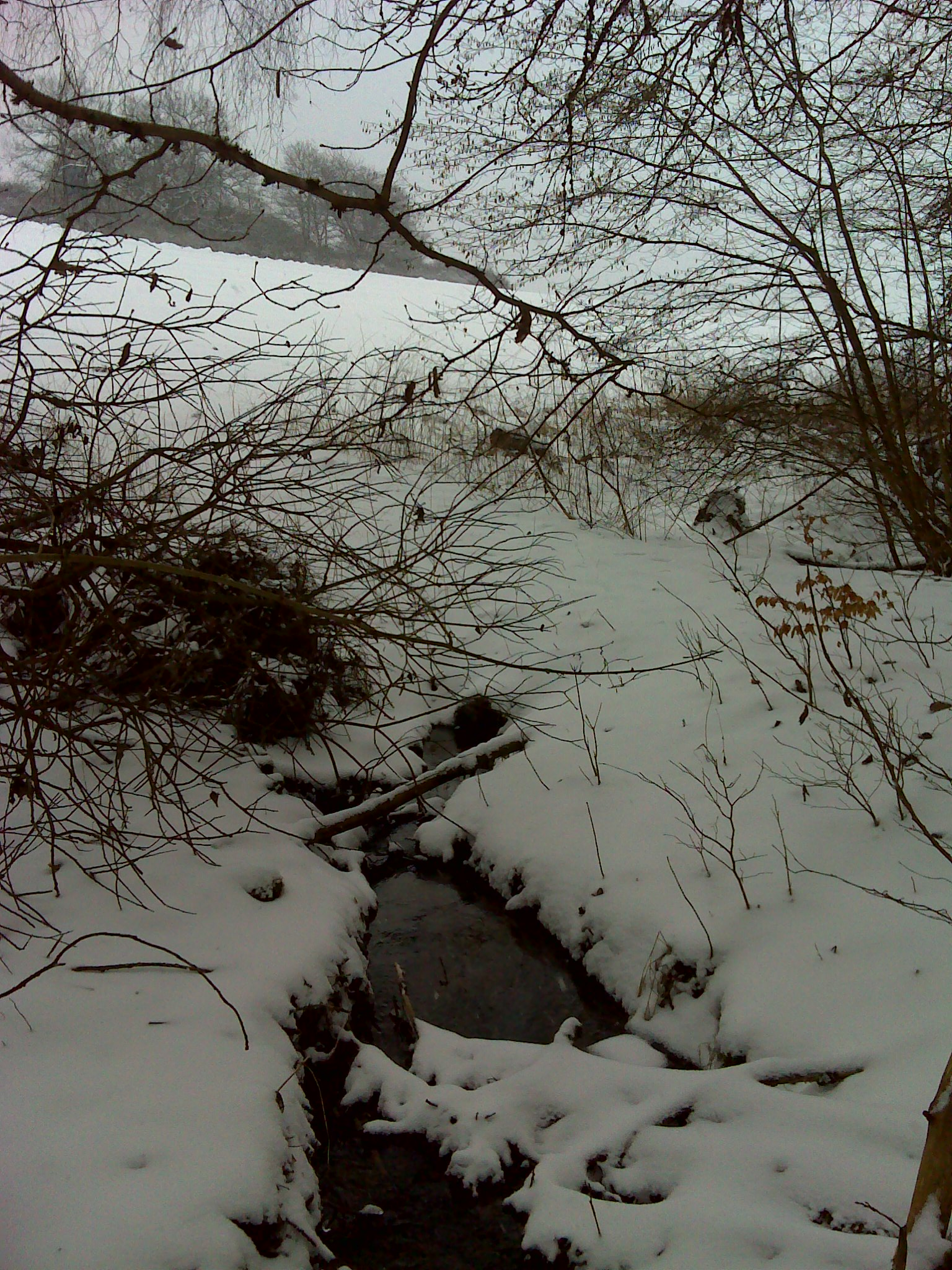

Location
- Country: Germany
- State: Hesse

Physical characteristics
- Mouth
  - location: Lahn
  - coordinates: 50.7249°N 8.7188°E
- Length: 6.4 km (4.0 mi)

Basin features
- Progression: Lahn→ Rhine→ North Sea
- Tributaries
  - right: Walgerbach

The Wenkbach is a tributary of the river Lahn in Weimar (Lahn), Hesse, Germany.

== See also ==
- List of rivers of Hesse
