= Dietzhölze =

River in Germany

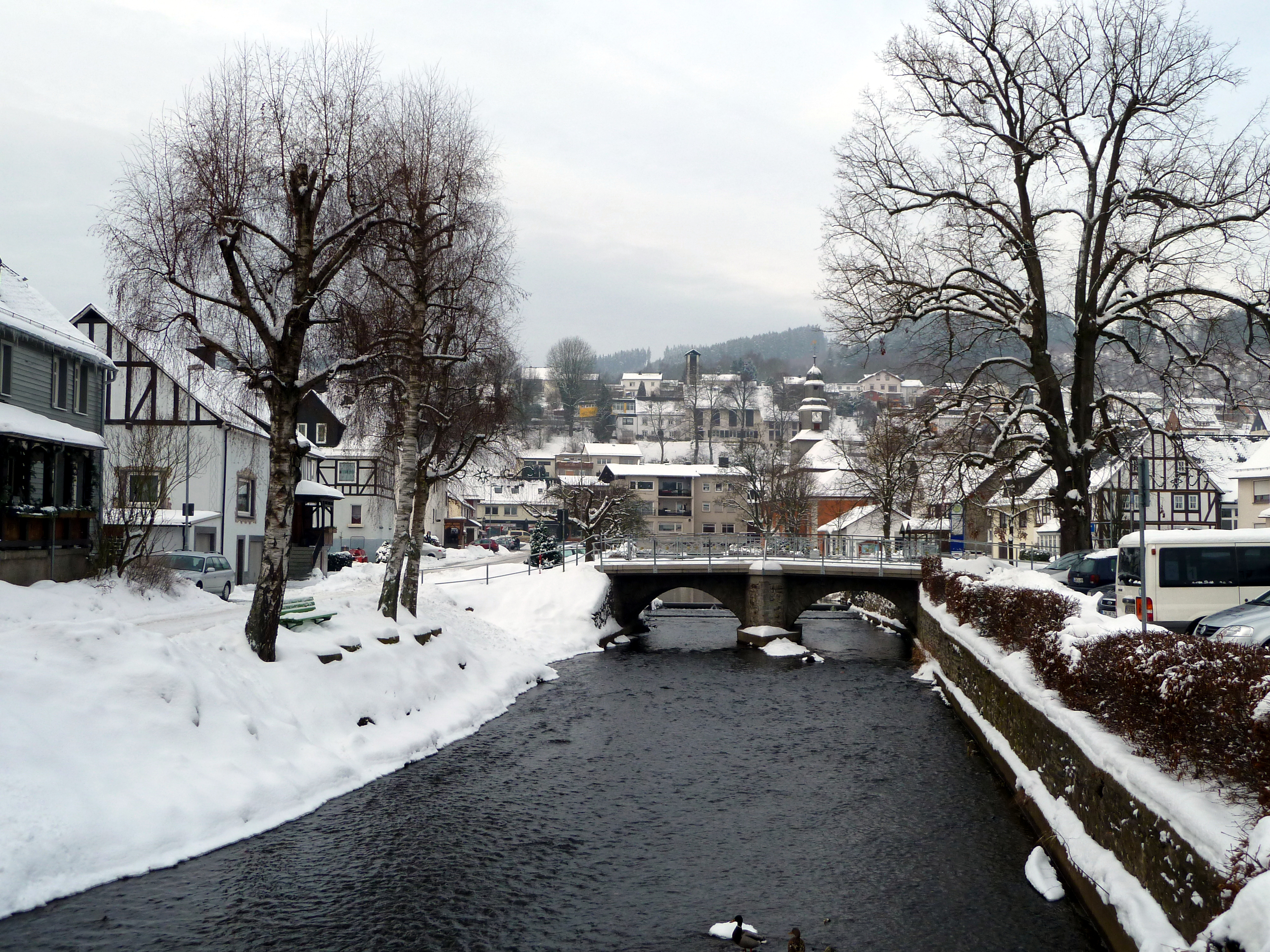

Location
- Country: Germany
- State: Hesse

Physical characteristics
- Mouth
  - location: Dill
  - coordinates: 50.7427°N 8.2762°E
- Length: 23.7 km (14.7 mi)

Basin features
- Progression: Dill→ Lahn→ Rhine→ North Sea

The Dietzhölze (German pronunciation: [ˈdiːtsˌhœltsə]) is a river of Hesse, Germany. It flows into the Dill in Dillenburg.

At the confluence with the Dill, the Dietzhölze is somewhat longer than its parent river, but has a much smaller catchment area (88 km² compared to 162 km² for the Dill) and contributes correspondingly less to the discharge (1400 l/s compared to 2900 l/s). However, if the right tributaries the Haigerbach and Aubach coming from the Westerwald are subtracted from the Upper Dill to the mouth, the Dill's values are reduced to 79 km² catchment area and 1300 l/s discharge. The Dietzhölze is therefore at least the equal second main river in the Dill system in relation to the Rothaargebirge and Struth.

== See also ==
- List of rivers of Hesse
