= Michelbach, Marburg =

Michelbach
- Borough of Marburg
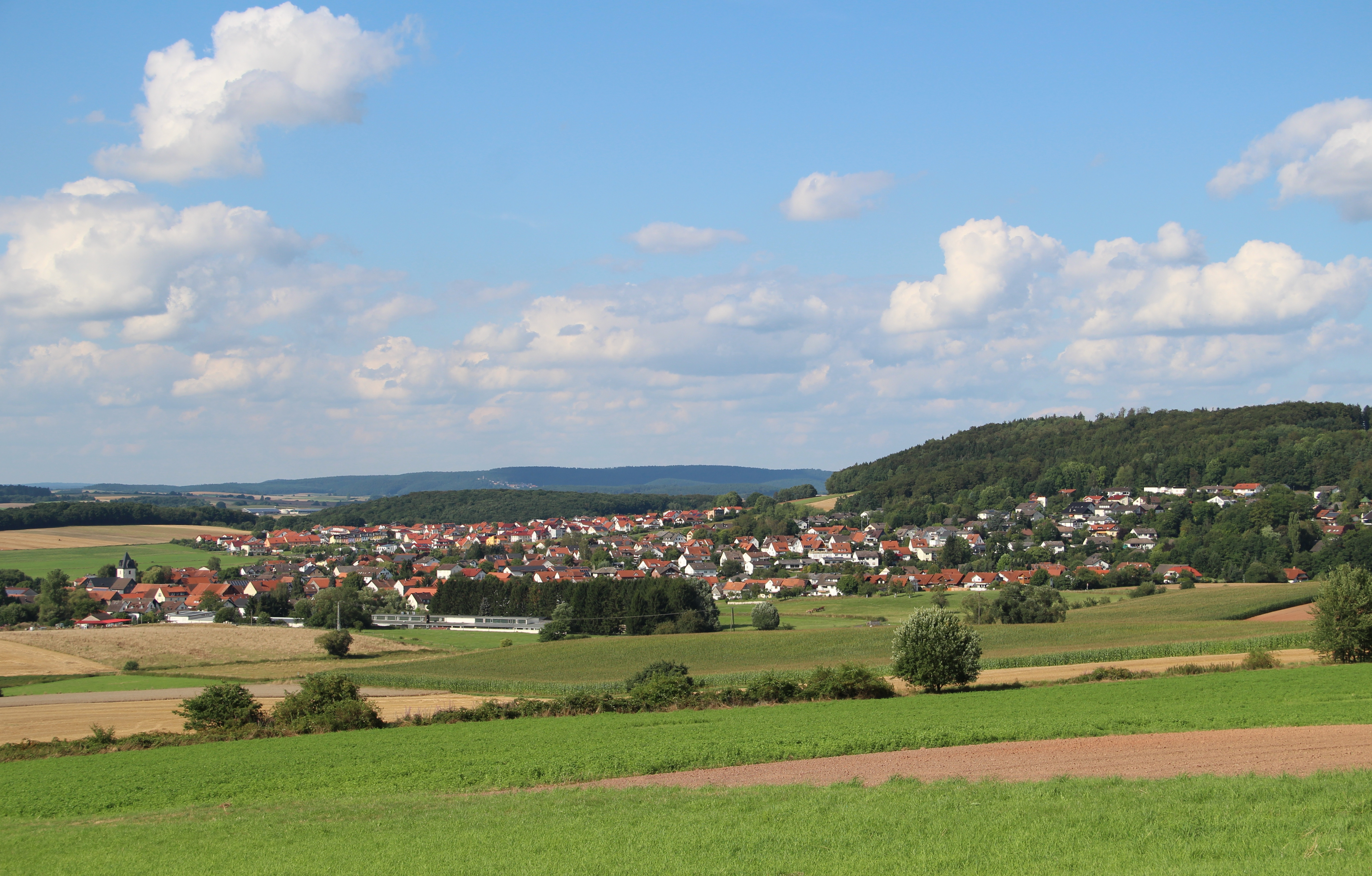

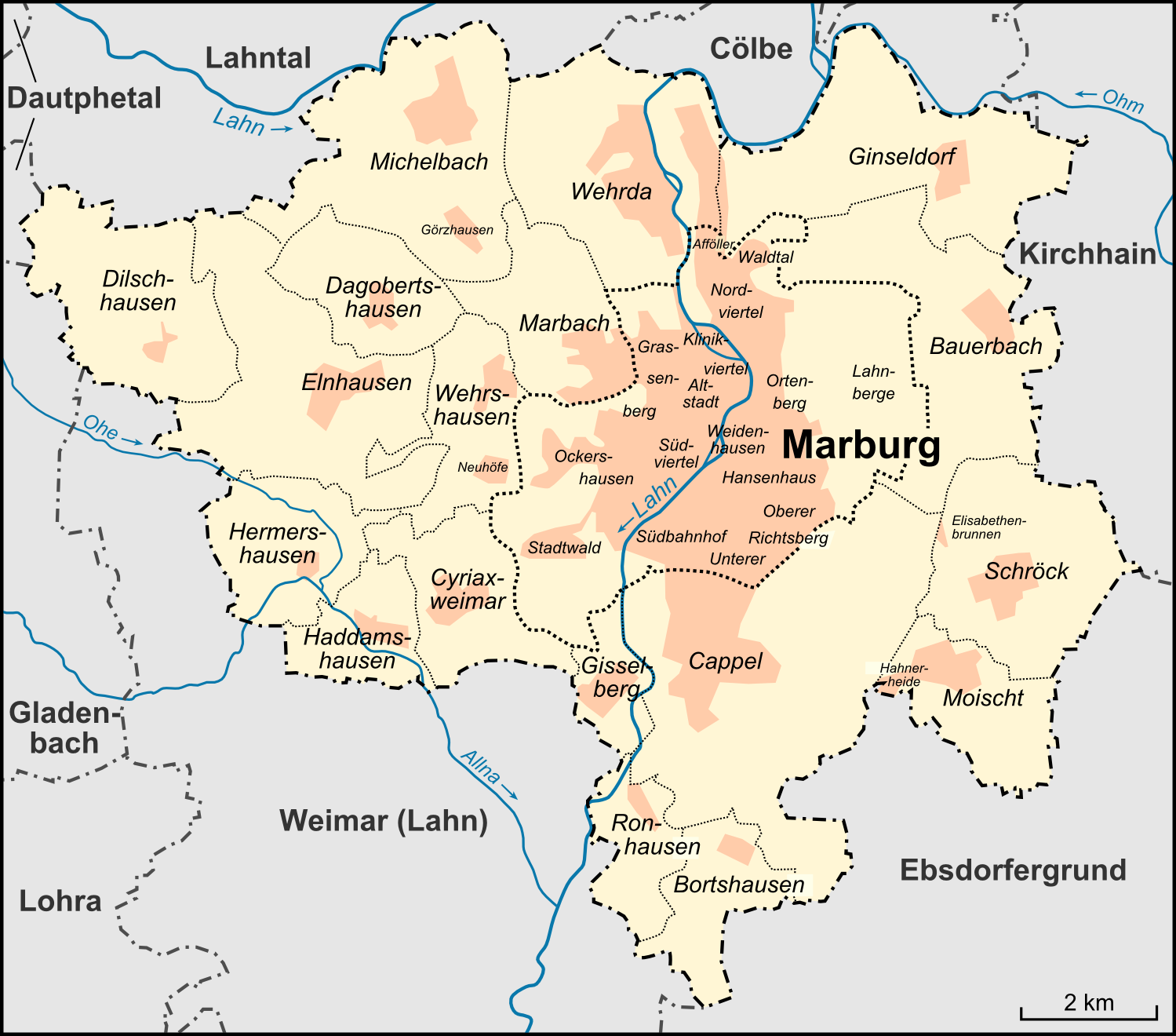
- Stadtteile of Marburg
- Interactive map of Michelbach
- Location within Germany Location within Hesse
- Coordinates: 50°50′44″N 8°42′58″E
- Country: Germany
- State: Hesse
- District: Marburg-Biedenkopf
- City: Marburg

Area
  - Total: 8.39 km^{2} (3.24 sq mi)
- Elevation: 235 m (771 ft)

Population (2019-12-31)
  - Total: 2,046
  - Density: 244/km^{2} (632/sq mi)
- Time zone: UTC+01:00 (CET)
  - Summer (DST): UTC+02:00 (CEST)
- Postal codes: 35041
- Dialling codes: 06420
- Website: www.michelbach.de

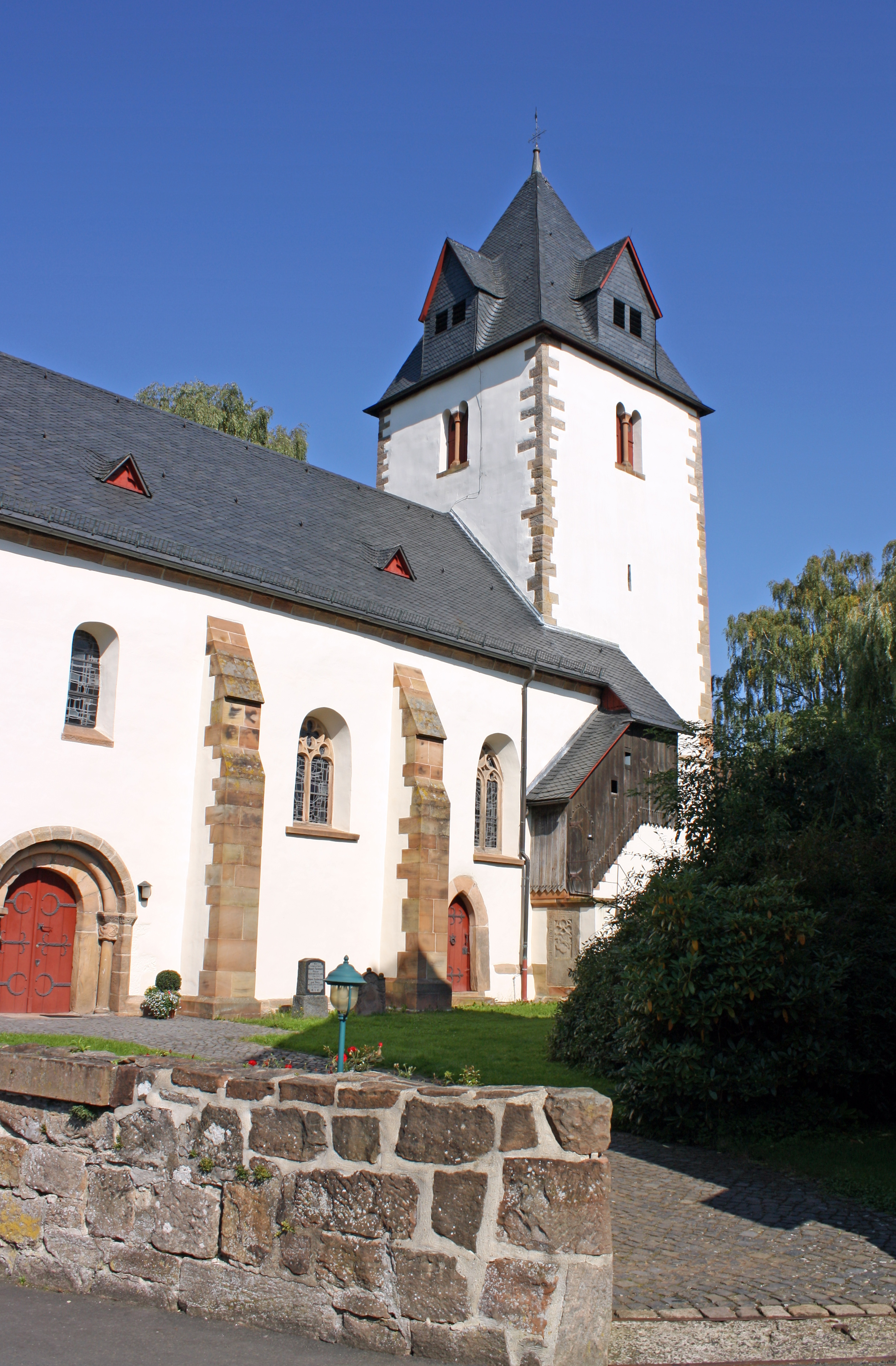
St. Martin's Church

Michelbach (German: [ˈmɪçl̩ˌbax]) is a borough (Ortsbezirk) of Marburg in Hesse.
