= Eichholzkopf =

Mountain in Germany

Coordinates: 50°51′11″N 8°17′24″E

Highest point
- Elevation: 610 m (2,000 ft)

Geography
- Location: Hesse, Germany
- Parent range: Rothaargebirge

Eichholzkopf is a mountain of Hesse, Germany. At an elevation of 610m, its peak is located near the local center Rittershausen, which is part of the municipality Dietzhölztal.
