= Dilschhausen =

- Borough of Marburg
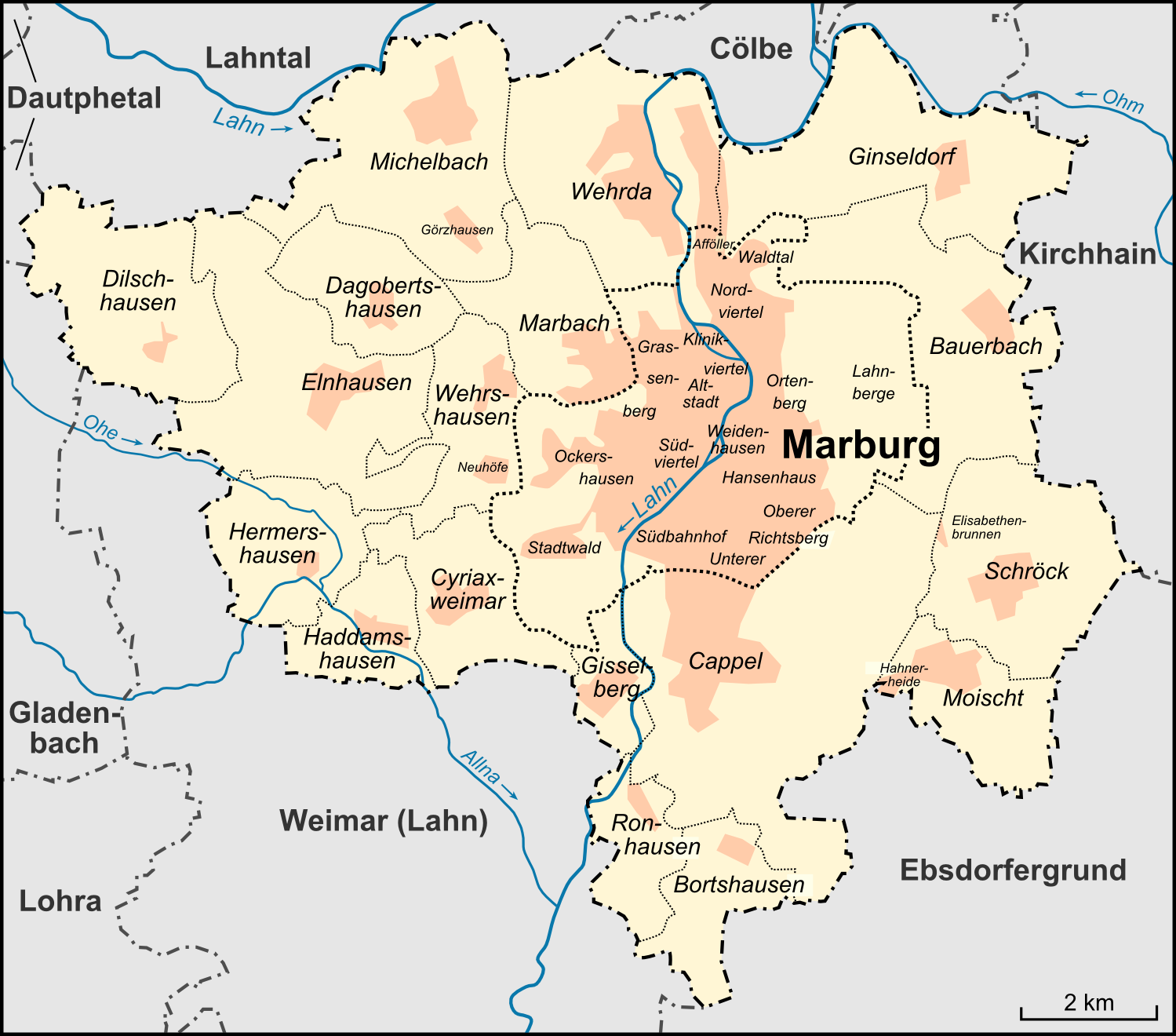
- Stadtteile of Marburg
- Interactive map of Dilschhausen
- Location within Germany Location within Hesse
- Coordinates: 50°49′04″N 08°39′31″E
- Country: Germany
- State: Hesse
- District: Marburg-Biedenkopf
- City: Marburg

Area
  - Total: 6.27 km^{2} (2.42 sq mi)
- Elevation: 261 m (856 ft)

Population (2019-12-31)
  - Total: 174
  - Density: 27.8/km^{2} (71.9/sq mi)
- Time zone: UTC+01:00 (CET)
  - Summer (DST): UTC+02:00 (CEST)
- Postal codes: 35041
- Dialling codes: 06420

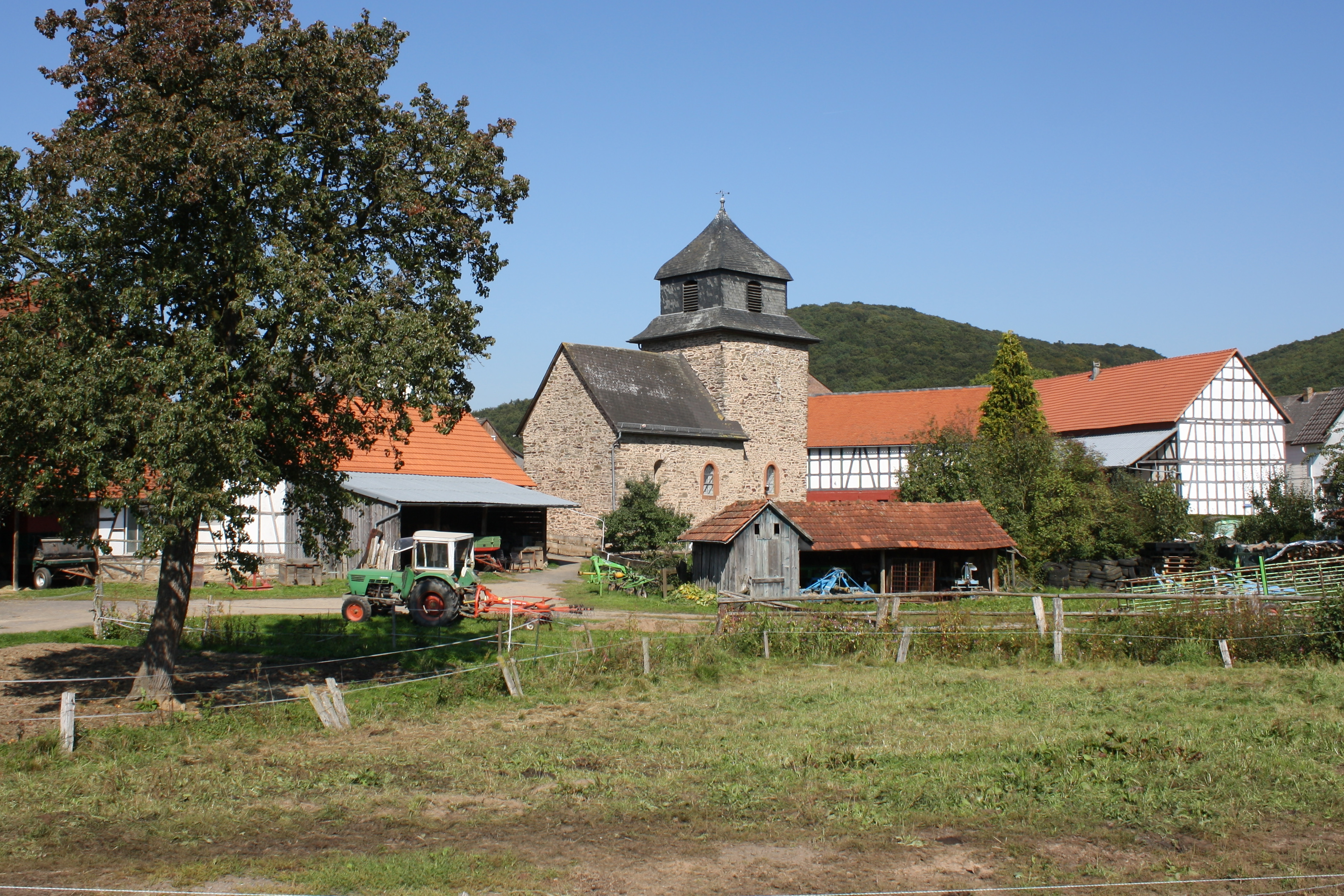
Dilschhausen chapel

Dilschhausen is a borough (Ortsbezirk) of Marburg in Hesse.
