= Diete =

Location
- Country: Germany
- State: Hesse

Physical characteristics
- Mouth
  - location: Perf
  - coordinates: 50.8812°N 8.4573°E

Basin features
- Progression: Perf→ Lahn→ Rhine→ North Sea

The Diete is a small river of Hesse, Germany. It flows in the central Hessian districts of Lahn-Dill-Kreis and Marburg-Biedenkopf. It then flows into the Perf near Breidenbach.

== See also ==
- List of rivers of Hesse
