= Dünsberg =

Hill in Hesse, Germany

Coordinates: 50°39′02″N 8°34′50″E

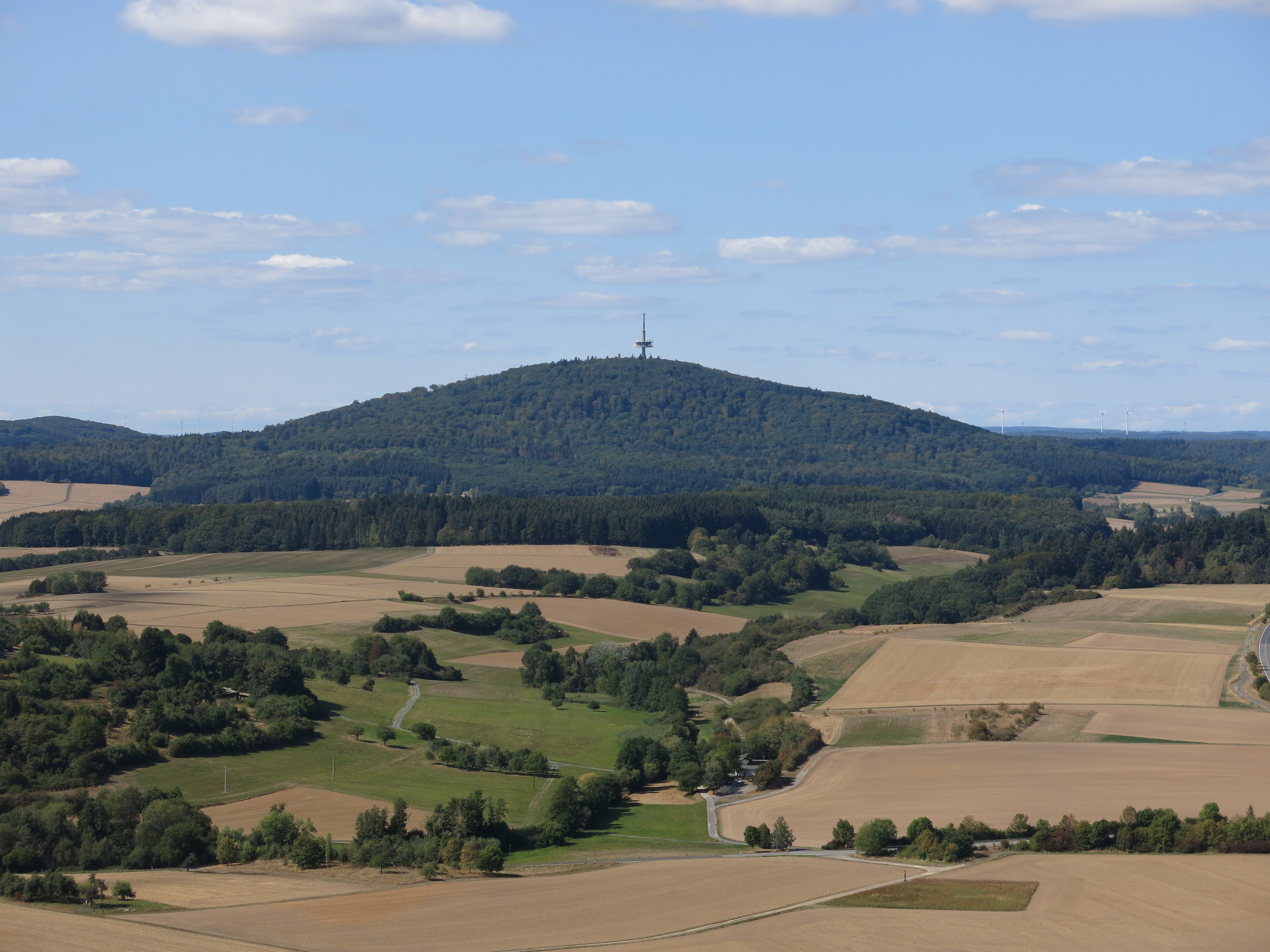
- The Dünsberg seen from Gleiberg Castle

Highest point
- Elevation: 498 m (1,634 ft)

Geography
- Location: Hesse, Germany

Dünsberg is a hill slightly northwest of Gießen in Hesse, Germany. At 498 meters in height, it is the highest mountain in the Gießen and Wetzlar area.

On the southern slope of the hill, grave mounds were found from the Neolithic and the Bronze Age. Fortification systems of the hill are detectable from the Urnfield period (8th century BC). The outer ramparts of the hillfort had 14 gates. The Celtic settlement (oppidum) reached its height during the La Tene period (about the 3rd century BC).

== Gallery ==
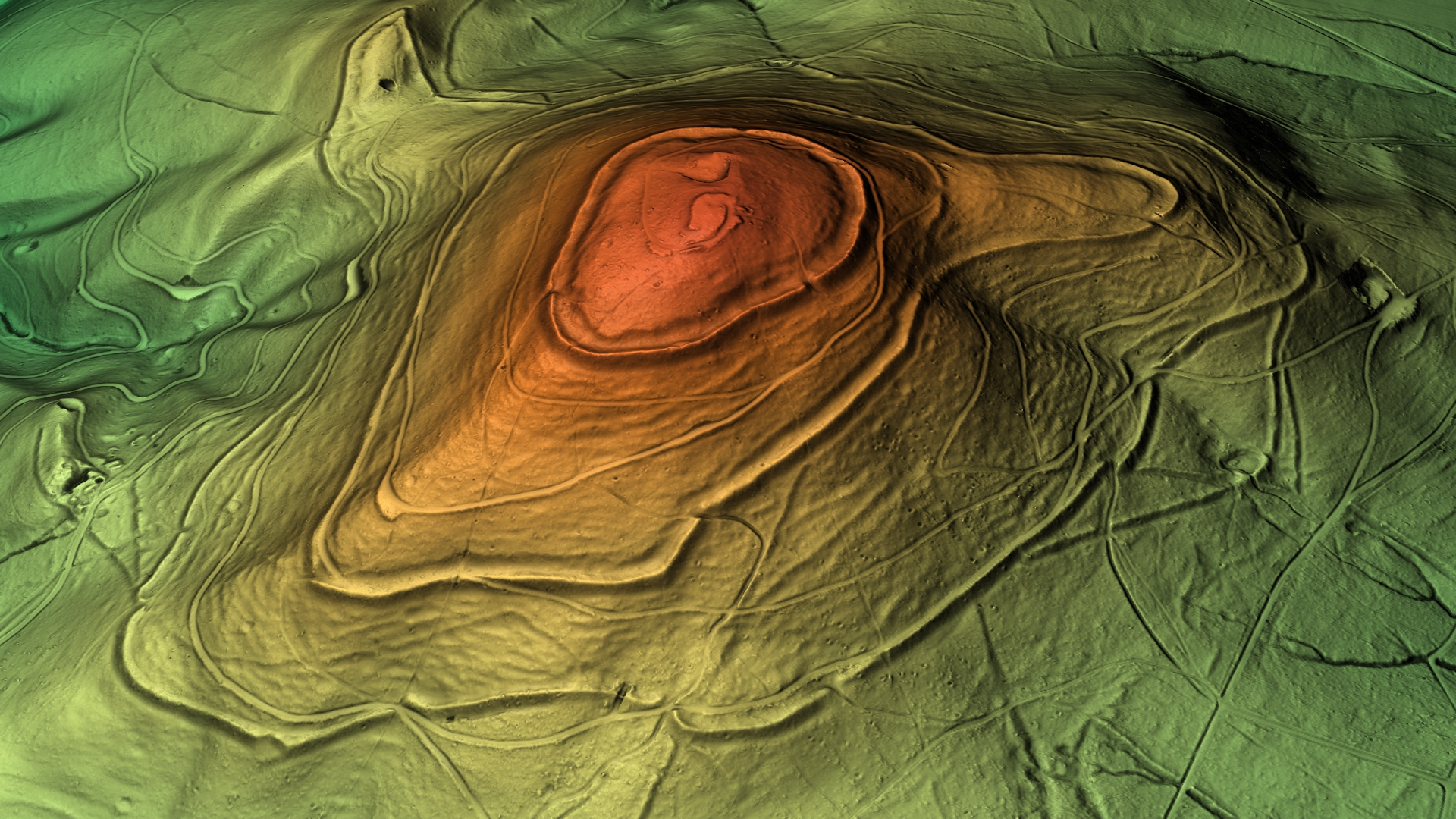
Dünsberg topography

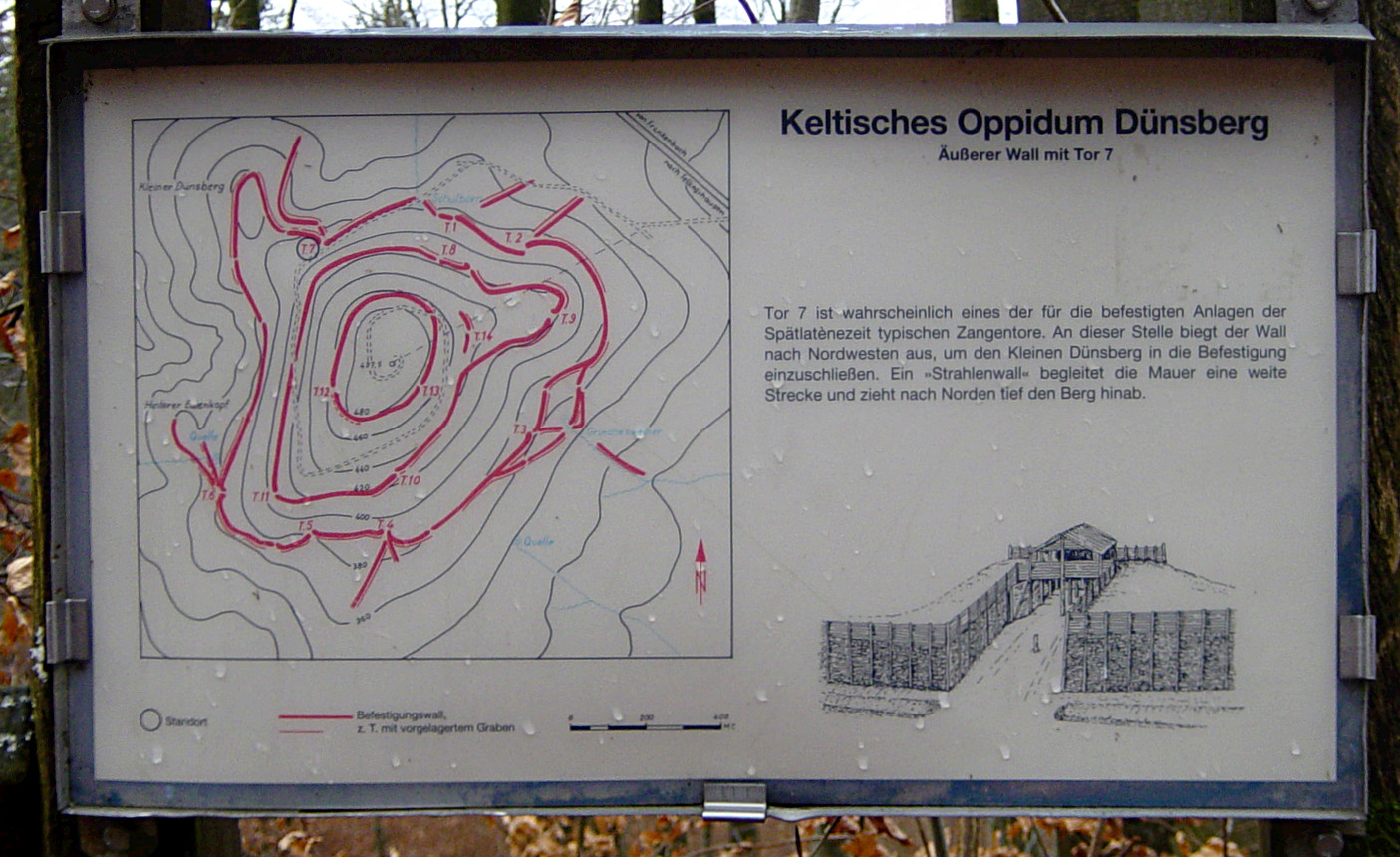
Dünsberg hillfort information board

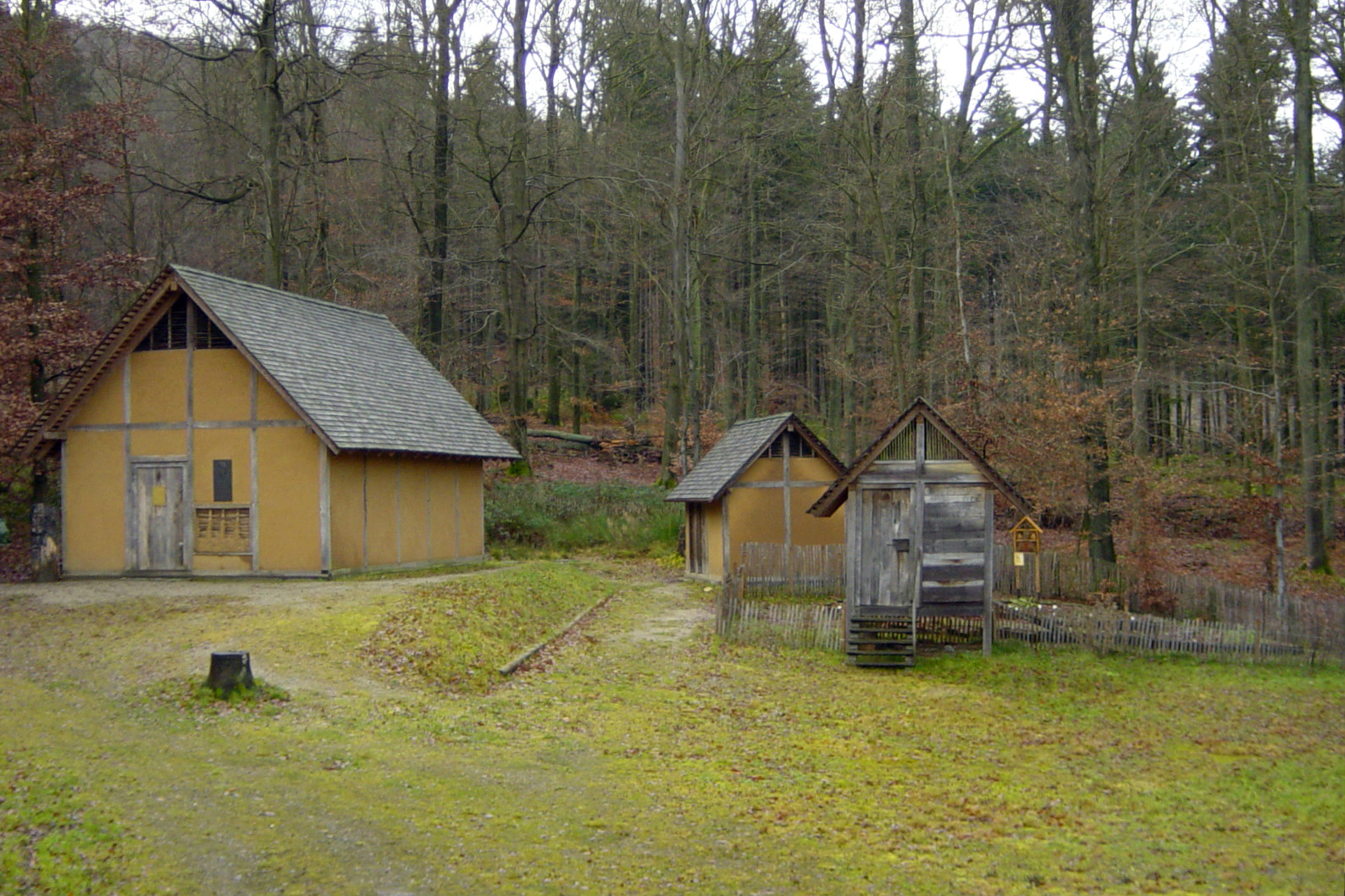
Reconstruction of Celtic buildings

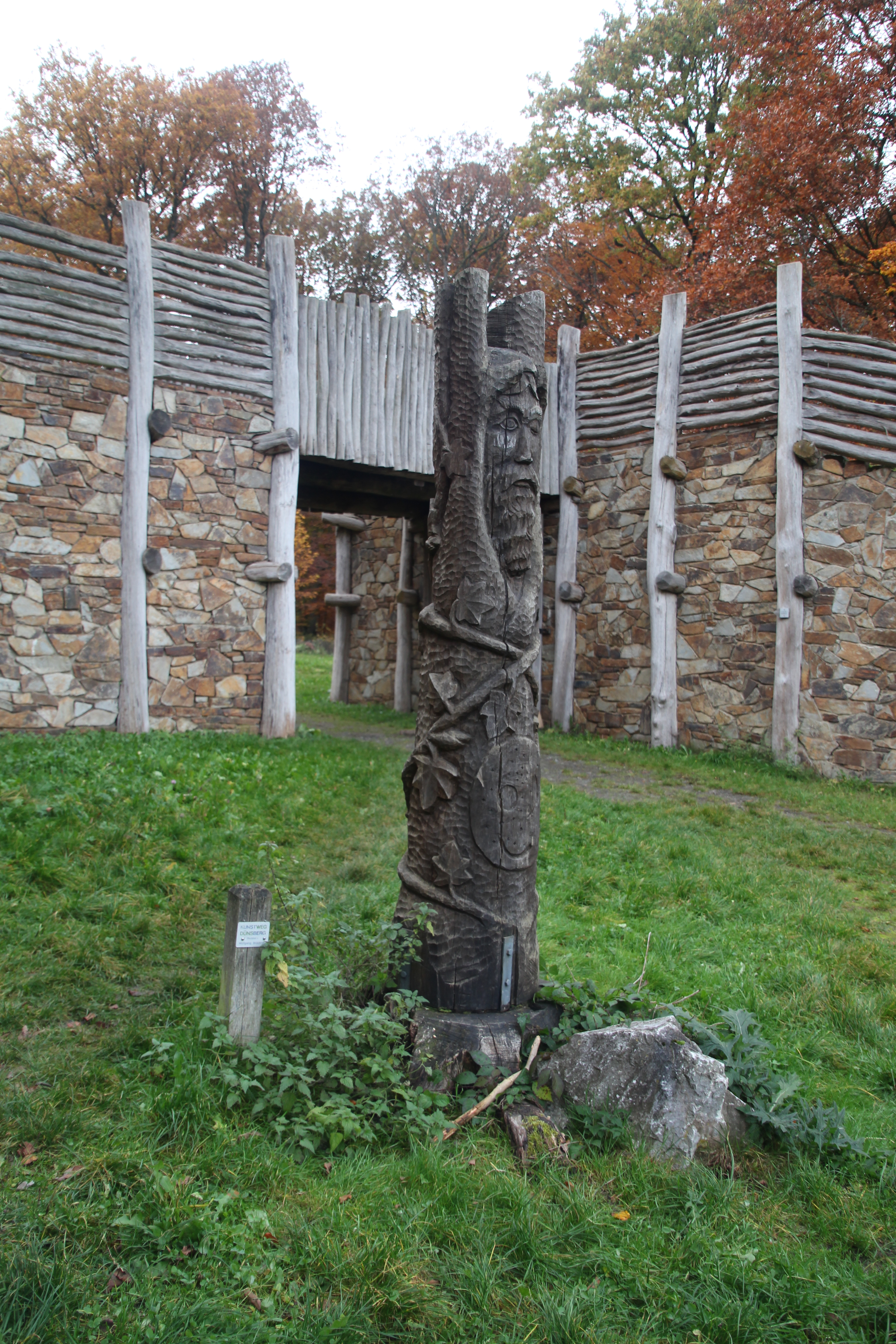
Dünsberg hillfort gate and sculpture, reconstruction

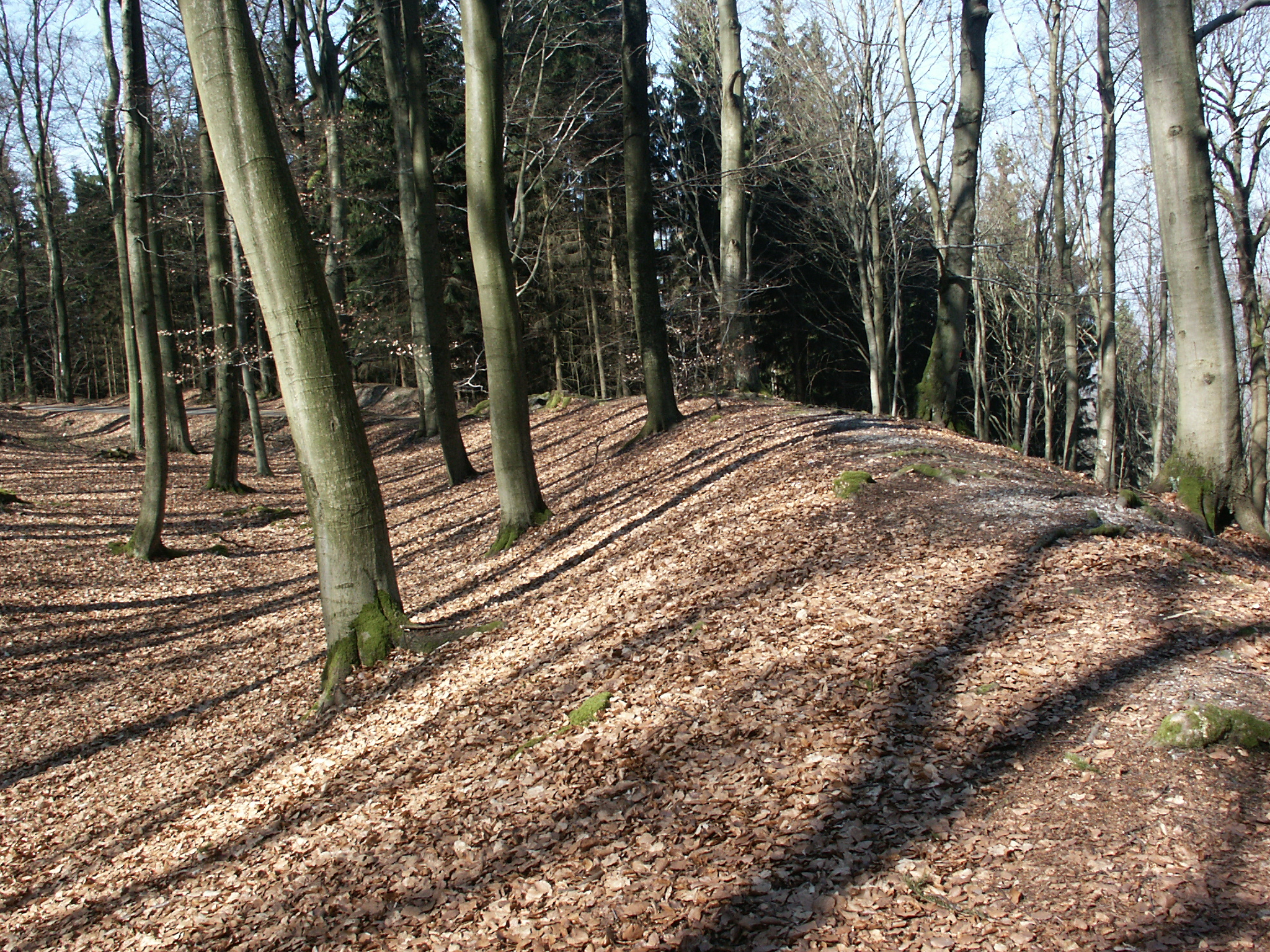
Dünsberg hillfort rampart remains
