= Elnhausen =

- Borough of Marburg
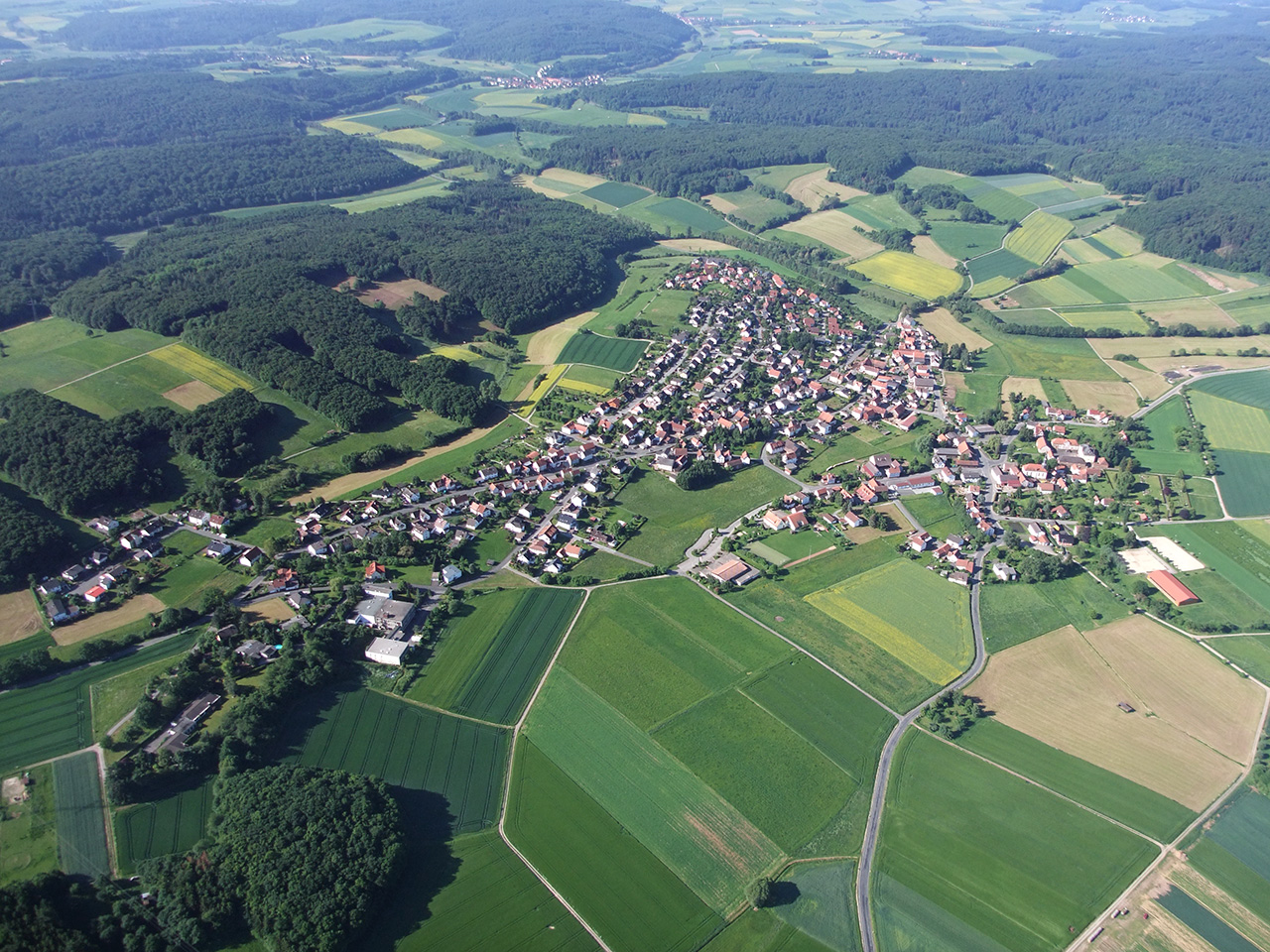
- Elnhausen

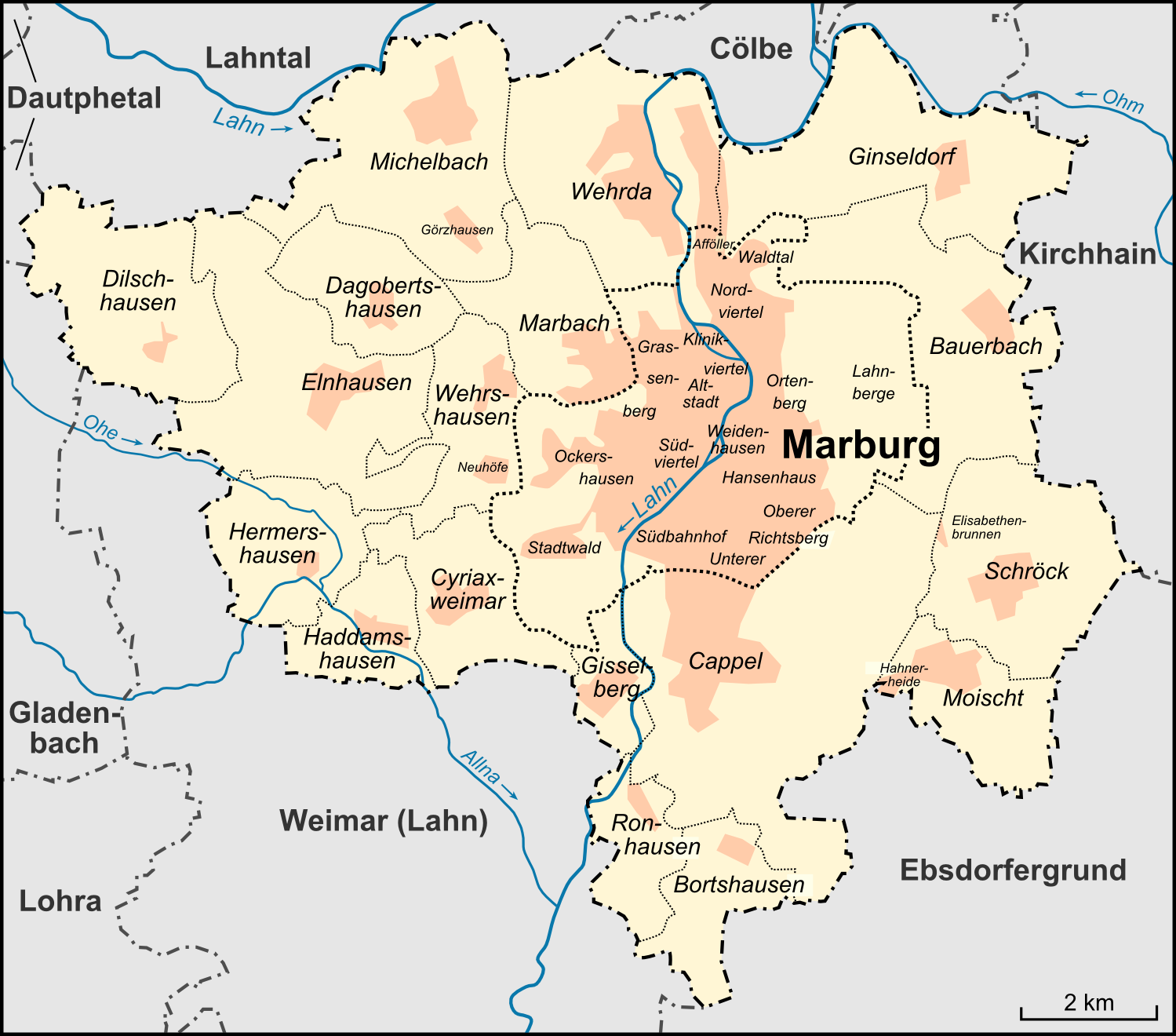
- Stadtteile of Marburg
- Interactive map of Elnhausen
- Location within Germany Location within Hesse
- Coordinates: 50°48′44″N 08°41′26″E
- Country: Germany
- State: Hesse
- District: Marburg-Biedenkopf
- City: Marburg

Area
  - Total: 9.18 km^{2} (3.54 sq mi)
- Elevation: 242 m (794 ft)

Population (2019-12-31)
  - Total: 1,042
  - Density: 114/km^{2} (294/sq mi)
- Time zone: UTC+01:00 (CET)
  - Summer (DST): UTC+02:00 (CEST)
- Postal codes: 35041
- Dialling codes: 06420

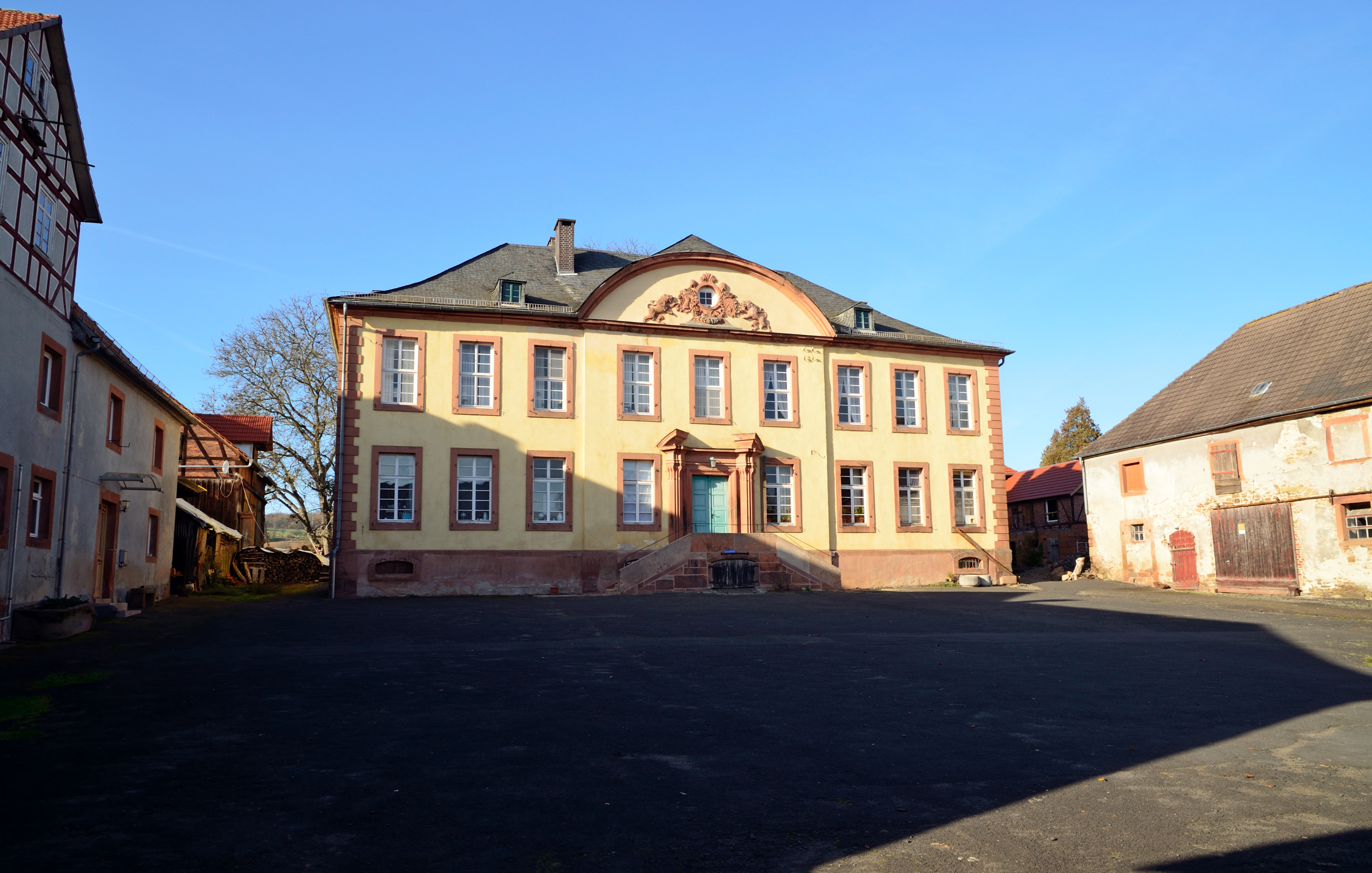
The Castle

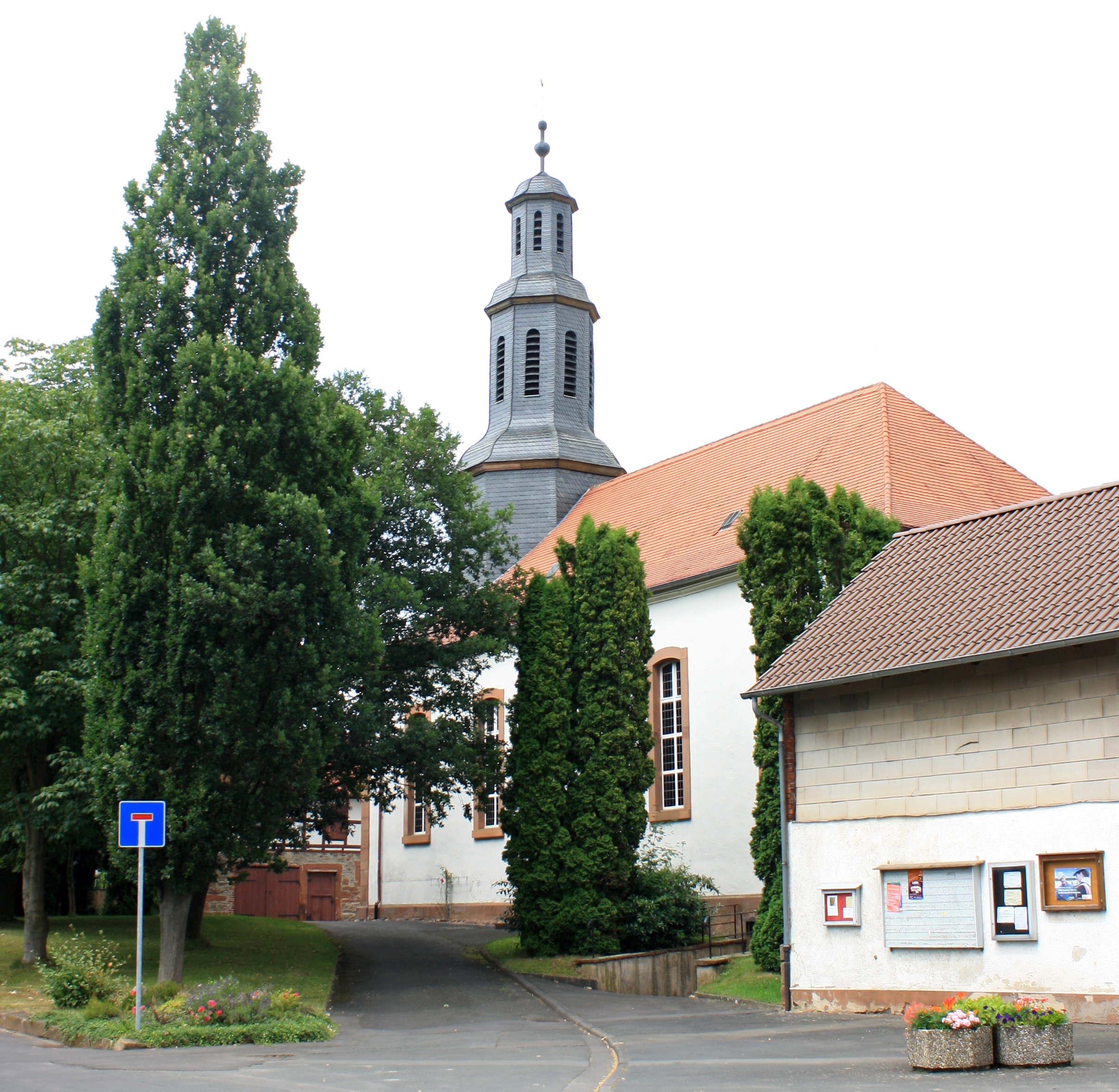
Elnhausen church, built in the 1740s

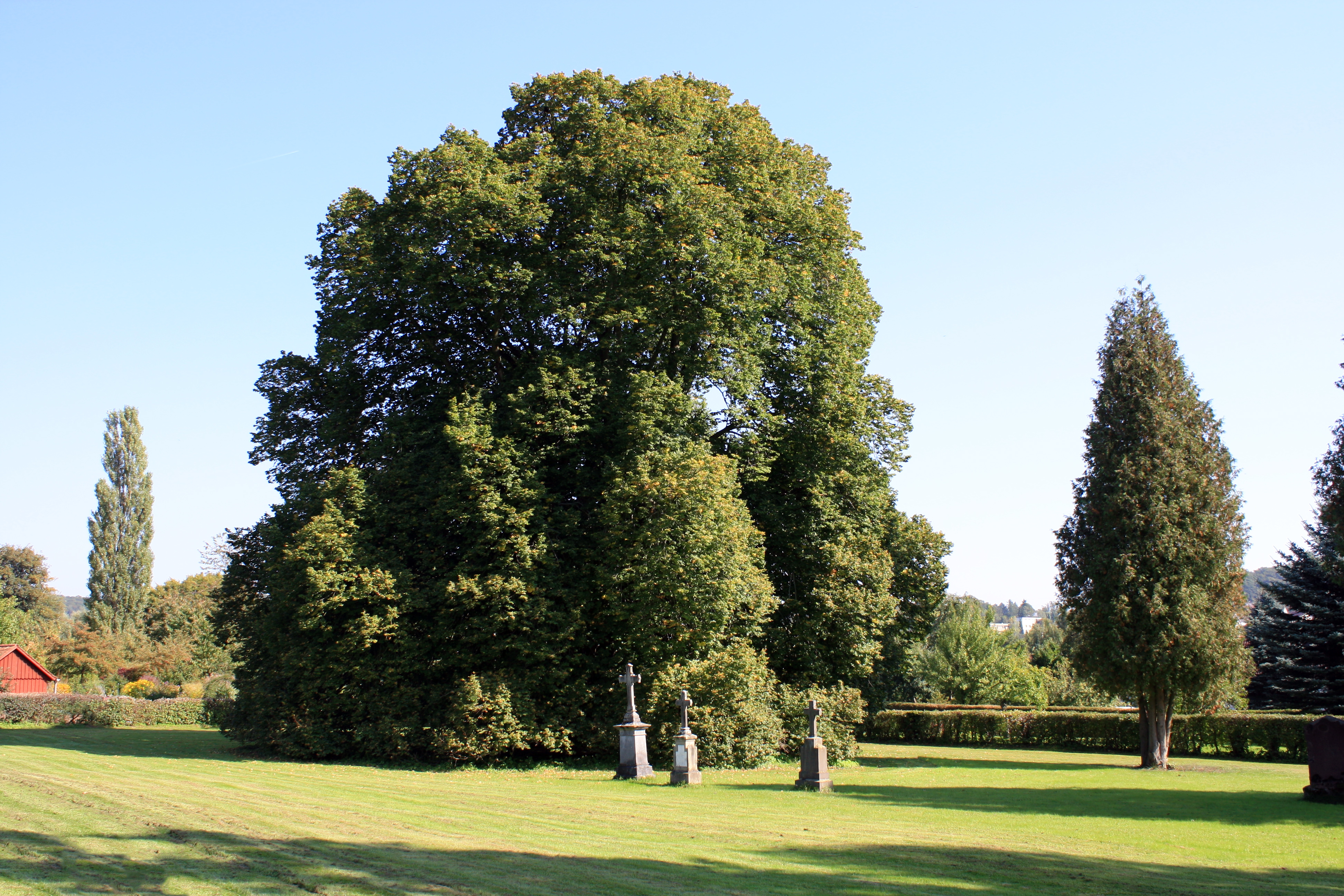
Tilia at Elnhausen cemetery

Elnhausen is a borough (Ortsbezirk) of Marburg in Hesse.

First documents date back to 1234. Back then the village was probably called Ellenhusen.

The village is divided into the old part with the castle, the church, farms and a newer part with several development areas.

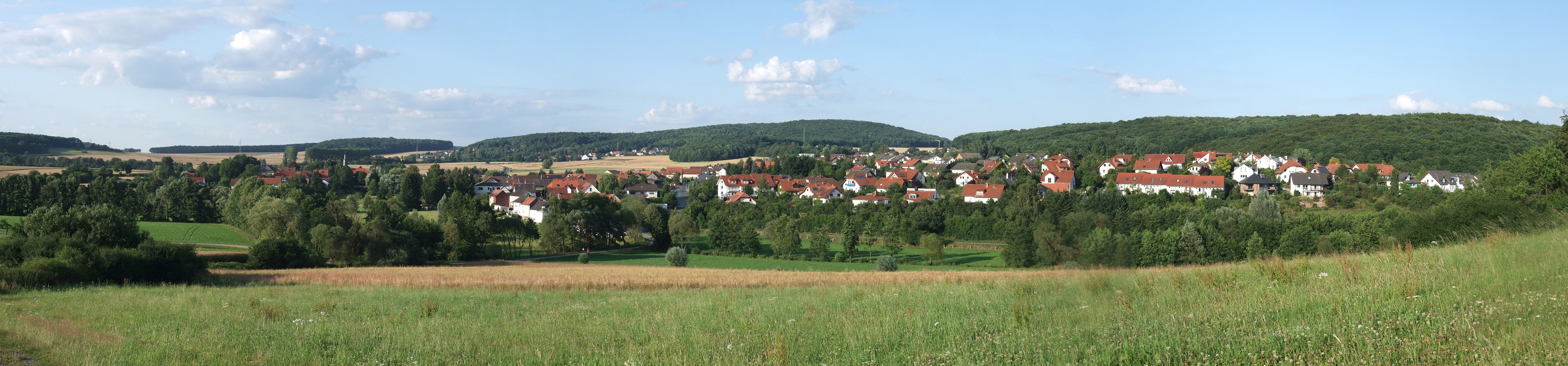
Southwesterly view of Elnhausen
