= Middle Hesse =

Planning region in Hesse, Germany

The region of Middle Hesse

The region of Middle Hesse (German: Region Mittelhessen, German: [ˈmɪtl̩ˌhɛsn̩]) is one of three planning regions in the German state of Hesse, alongside North and South Hesse. Its territory is identical with that of the administrative province of Gießen (Regierungsbezirk Gießen) and covers the counties of Limburg-Weilburg, Lahn-Dill-Kreis, Gießen, Marburg-Biedenkopf and Vogelsbergkreis. The Middle Hesse Regional Assembly (Regionalversammlung Mittelhessen), which decides on the regional plan, currently consists of 31 members chosen by the five counties and the three towns with special status: Gießen, Marburg and Wetzlar. The regional assembly has tasked the governing president (Regierungspräsident) with delivering regional management. The Mid-Hesse Regional Management Association (Regionalmanagementverein MitteHessen) was founded on 22 January 2003.

== Geology and geography ==
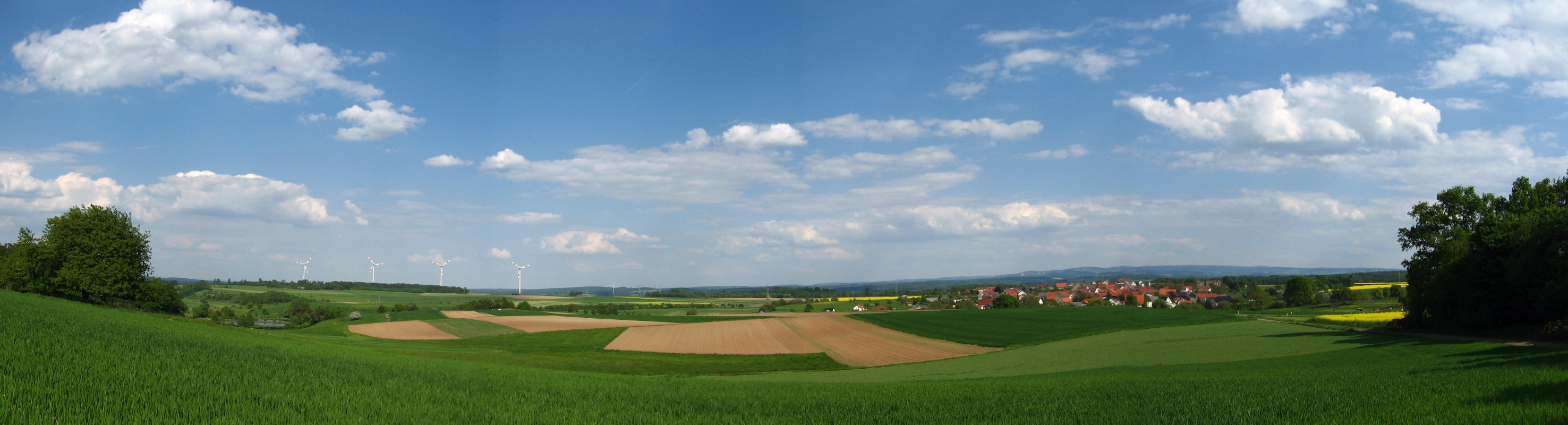
The Lumda Plateau – view of Bernsfeld

Middle Hesse is geomorphologically a mix of uplands and valley depressions, originally shaped by volcanism. The valley of the Lahn, including the natural regions of the Upper Lahn Valley, Marburg-Gießen Lahn Valley, Weilburg Lahn Valley region and Limburg Basin, bisects the region down the centre. Of the highlands on both sides of the river valley, only the Vogelsberg (to its left) and the Gladenbach Uplands (to its right) lie entirely within Middle Hesse. Of the others, only the northern part of the Eastern Hintertaunus in the Taunus, the eastern part of the Westerwald, almost to its highest point, and the (south-)east slopes of the Rothaar at the Kalteiche, including the Haincher Heights and Sackpfeife, are actually within Middle Hesse.

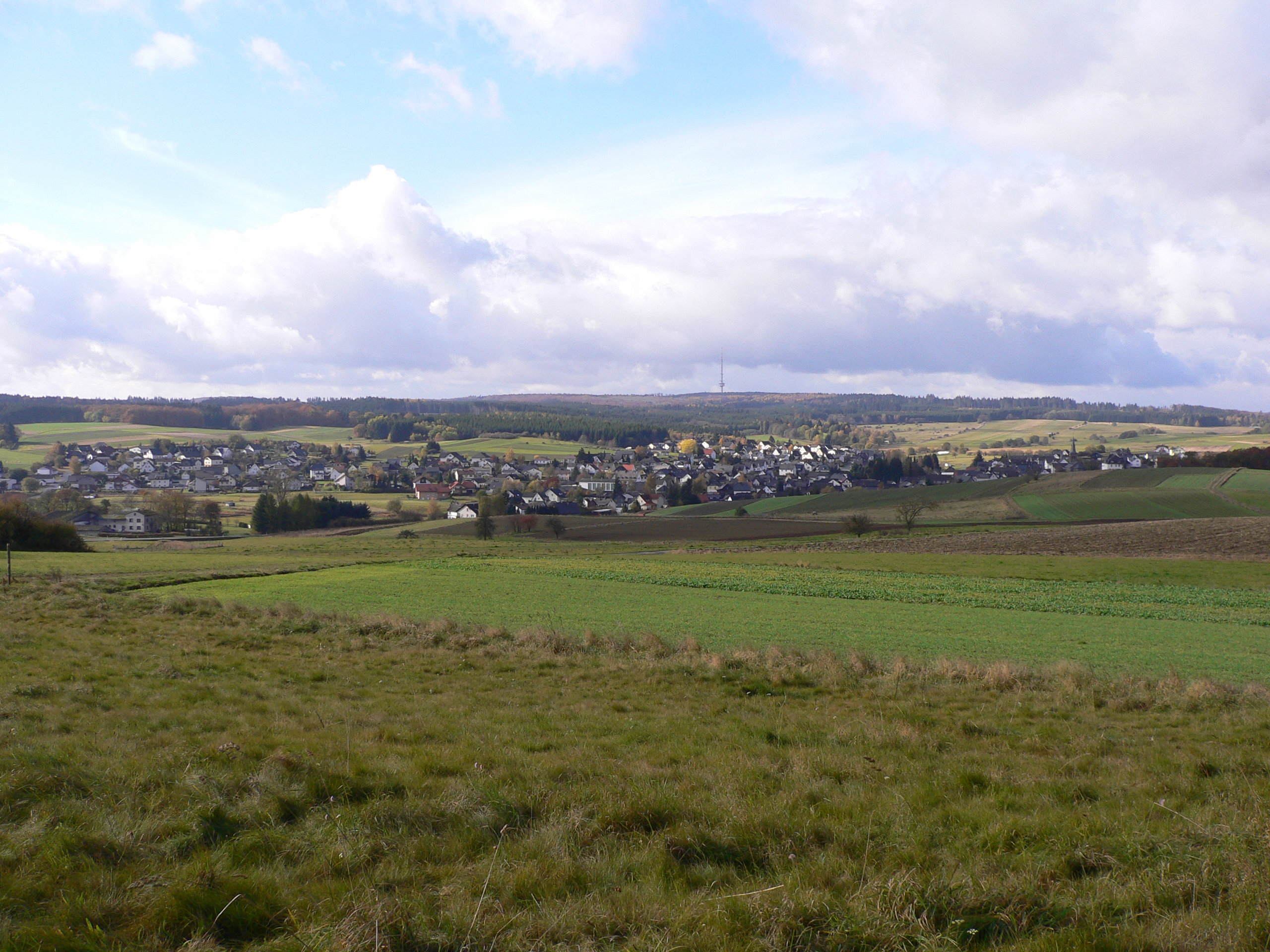
Bottenhorn Plateaux in the Gladenbach Uplands, i.M. 480 m to 500 m above NN

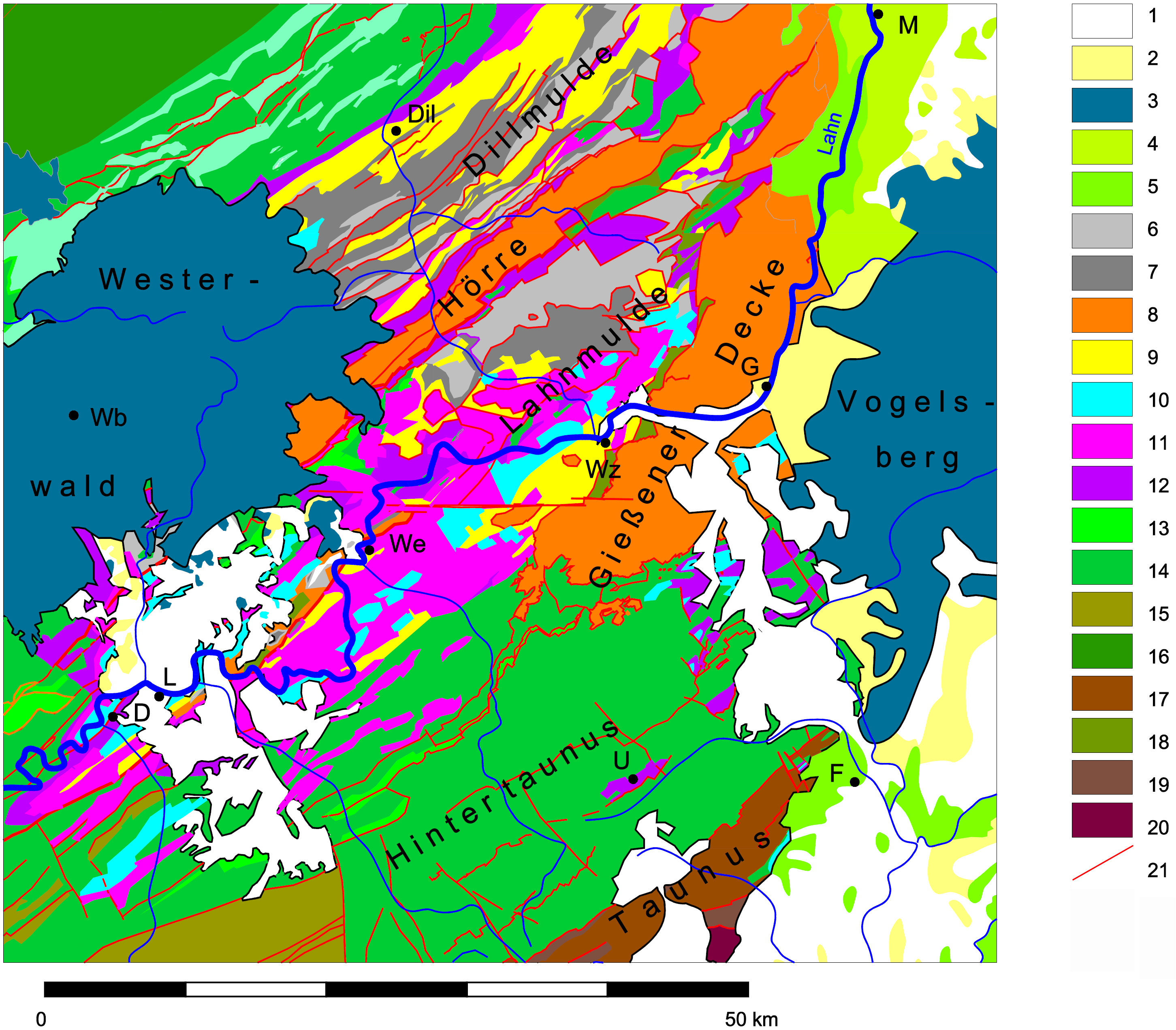
Geological map of Middle Hesse

The western Middle Hesse belongs to the Rhenish Massif and is therefore its oldest part (formed during the Palaeozoic around 300 to 500 million years ago). This, initially single, mountain chain was uplifted again during the Alpine folding and finally took on the morphology visible today: the vulcanites of the Westerwald and its bisection by the rivers Lahn and Dill with raised fault blocks (Dill Basin) like the Limburg Basin that were broken again during the Tertiary. Depositions of loess and the availability of water resulted in its early settlement.

The Hintertaunus includes the southern part of the Middle Hessian slate mountains; north of the Lahn is the Tertiary volcanic upland of the Westerwald and, immediately to the east are the Gladenbach Uplands. The red iron deposits in the west of the latter uplands, which include the Lahn-Dill region, were the prerequisite for the very early establishment of iron and non-ferrous metal mining, owe their formation to the submarine volcanicity of the Upper Devonian. The kaolin-rich clays of limnic-terrestrial sediments were produced by the depositions of the sea that once covered almost the whole of Germany in the Palaeozoic. They formed the raw materials for the early production of pottery and brick ware in the region. Time and again, attempts were made to mine lignite in Middle Hesse; the use of mineral springs from this time e.g. in the Löhnberger Basin or in Selters has clearly been more successful even to date.

The West Hesse Highlands adjoin the slate mountains to the east, as far as the West Hesse Depression. During the Palaeozoic (Mesozoic, around 140 to 200 million years ago), the depression filled up with sediment sequences. Of particular mention, in the highlands west of the depression, is the Bunter sandstone, up to 1,000 metres thick, a porous rock, thus not attractive for settlement, which characterises the Burgwald, as well as the Marburg Ridge, the Lahnberge and the northern part of the Upper Hessian Ridge.

The low mountains of the Vogelsberg in the east of Middle Hesse, with a basalt surface area of 2,500 km², is the largest contiguous volcanic mountain range in Europe. Long ago the lavas spread out into table-like formations with a basalt thickness of up to 300 metres.

In the centre of Middle Hesse lie several basins which are part of the Mediterranean-Mjösen graben (European rift zone): in the south the foothills of the Wetterau rise in the region, enclosing the Gießen Basin and, behind the barrier of the Anterior Vogelsberg, the Amöneburg Basin.

=== Mountains ===
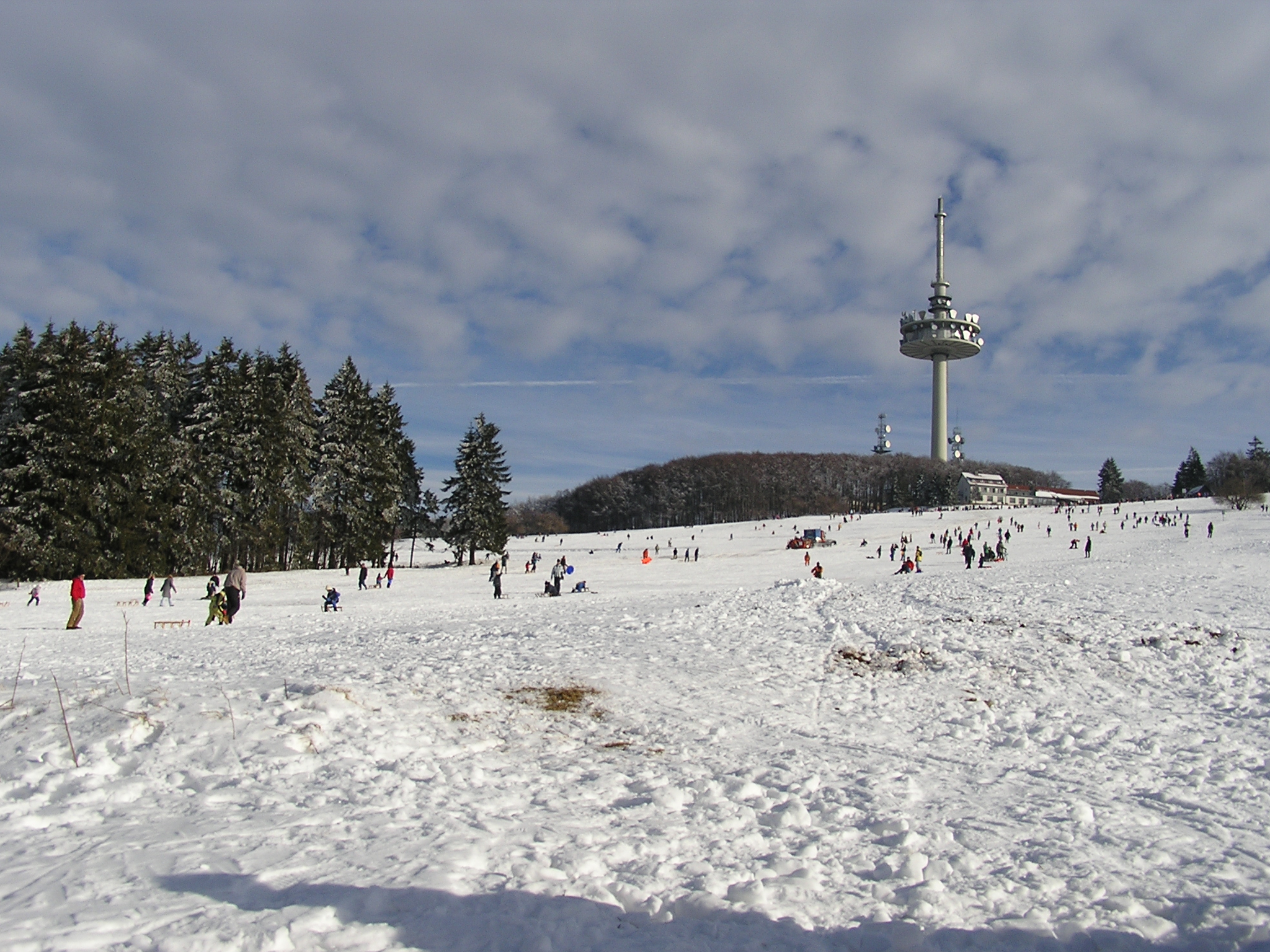
The Vogelsberg in winter

Buttes of the Rhenish Massif - like the Sackpfeife (674 m), Angelburg (609 m), Dünsberg (498 m) and Rimberg (498 m); and basalt kuppen, like the Amöneburg, Stoppelberg (402 m) in the north of the Eastern Hintertaunus or the Gleiberg - characterise the landscape. The most important mountains of the Middle Hesse portion of the Westerwald are the Höllberg (643 m), Auf der Baar (618 m) and Knoten (605 m). The most important hills of the Middle Hessian part of the Eastern Hintertaunus are the Kuhbett (526 m), Hesselberg (518 m) and Steinkopf (518 m). The highest summit in Middle Hesse is the Taufstein in the east of the region in the Vogelsberg mountains, which reaches a height of 773 metres.

=== Rivers ===
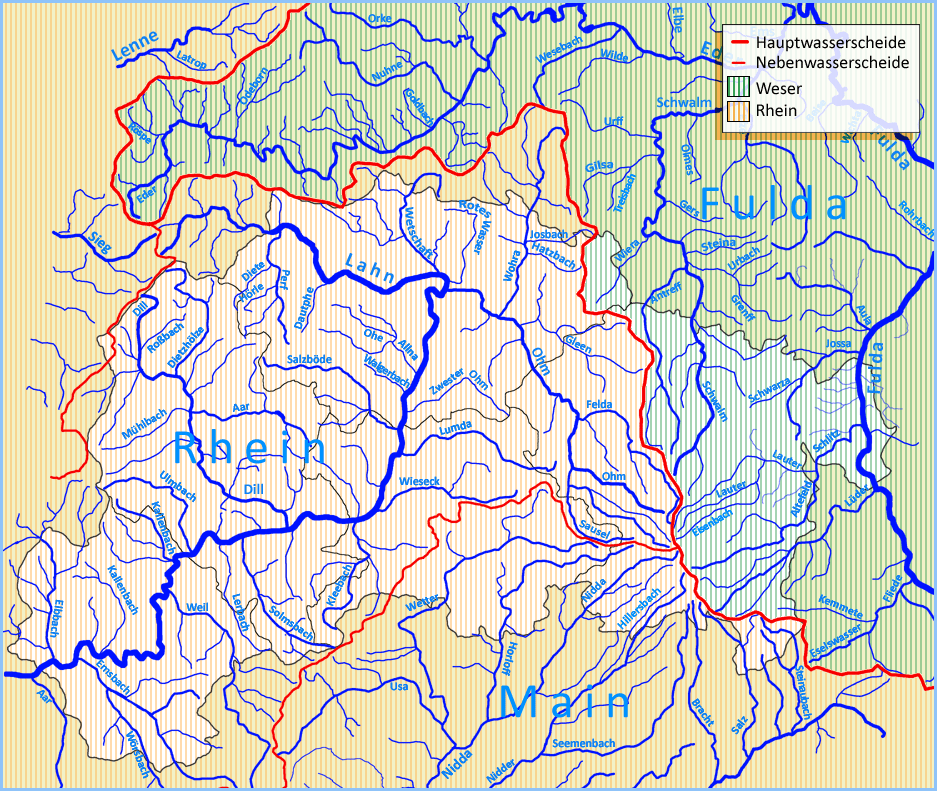
Rivers in Middle Hesse

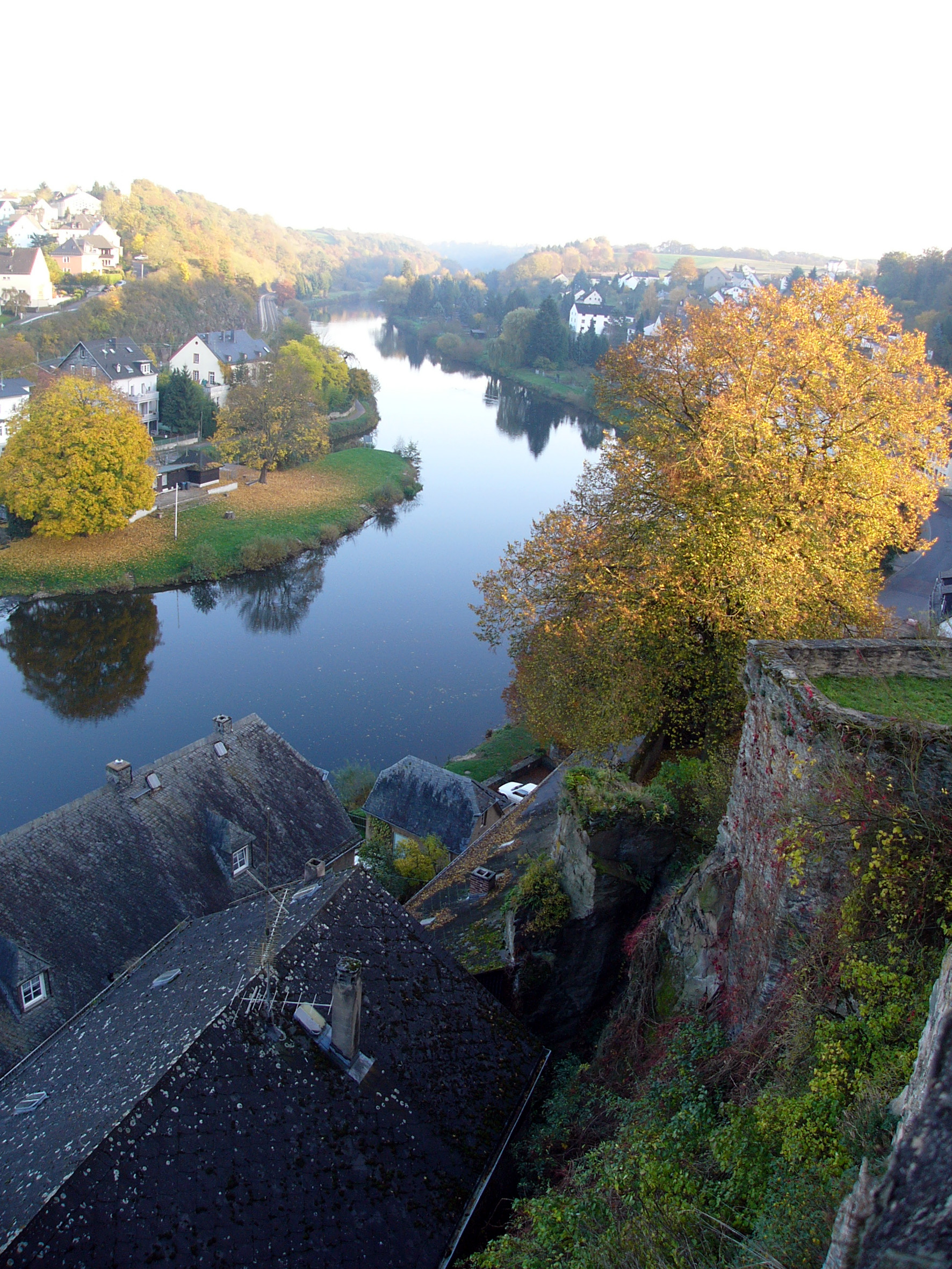
The Lahn valley near Runkel

The river valleys, especially those of the Lahn and Dill, have incised the landscape deeply in places and represent historically important lines of communication that had a great influence on the developments of towns and the economy. In the valley of the Dill, roughly 250 metres deep, numerous mineral deposits in the bedrock were exposed. The larger tributaries of the Lahn in Middle Hesse include the Dill, Ohm, Weil and Emsbach.

Running diagonally across the Vogelsberg from southeast to northwest is the Rhine-Weser Watershed. The rivers that rise in the northern and eastern Vogelsberg drain via the Fulda into the Weser. These include the Schwalm, Antrift, Lüder and Schlitz.

The Wetter, by contrast, is a tributary of the Nidda and drains into the Main.

== Literature ==
- There is literature about Middle Hesse in the Hessian Bibliography
- Georg Dehio, Ernst Gall, M. Herchenröder: Handbuch der deutschen Kunstdenkmäler – Südliches Hessen. Revised by Ernst Gall. 3rd unrevised edition, Deutscher Kunstverlag, Munich, 1961.
- Karl E. Demandt: Geschichte des Landes Hessen. Bärenreiter Verlag, Kassel und Basel 1972, ISBN 3-7618-0404-0.
- Wilhelm Classen: Die kirchliche Organisation Althessens im Mittelalter samt einem Umriss der neuzeitlichen Entwicklung, 2nd edition, reprint of the original 1929 edition with map section (15 maps), Elwert Marburg, 1980, ISBN 3-7708-0694-8.
- Willi Schulze, Harald Uhlig (eds.): Gießener Geographischer Exkursionsführer Mittleres Hessen. Vols. 1–3, Geographisches Institut und Institut für Didaktik der Geographie der Justus Liebig-Universität Gießen, Brühlscher Verlag, Gießen, 1982, ISBN 3-922300-10-3.
- Regierungspräsidium Gießen in Verbindung mit der Historischen Kommission für Hessen (publ.): Mittelhessen: aus Vergangenheit und Gegenwart. Hitzeroth, Marburg, 1991, ISBN 3-89398-066-0.
- Ulrich G. Großmann: Mittel- und Südhessen. Dumont Verlag, Cologne, 1995, ISBN 3-7701-2957-1.
- Sparkassen-Kulturstiftung Hessen-Thüringen (publ.): Kulturelle Entdeckungen Mittelhessen. Schnell + Steiner, Regensburg, 2007, ISBN 978-3-7954-1854-0.
- Georg Dehio: Dehio – Handbuch der deutschen Kunstdenkmäler. Hessen I: Die Regierungsbezirke Gießen und Kassel. Bearb. von Folkhard Cremer und Tobias M Wolf. Deutscher Kunstverlag, Munich 2008, ISBN 978-3-422-03092-3.
- Sparkassen-Kulturstiftung Hessen-Thüringen (publ.): Kulturelle Entdeckungen: Main-Kinzig-Kreis, Vogelsbergkreis, Wetteraukreis. Schnell + Steiner, Regensburg, 2009, ISBN 978-3-7954-2189-2.
- Communication Solution GmbH/David Hart (ed.): Newcomers Guide. Welcome Home to Mittelhessen. 2011.
