= Monumenta Germaniae Historica =

German research institute and book series

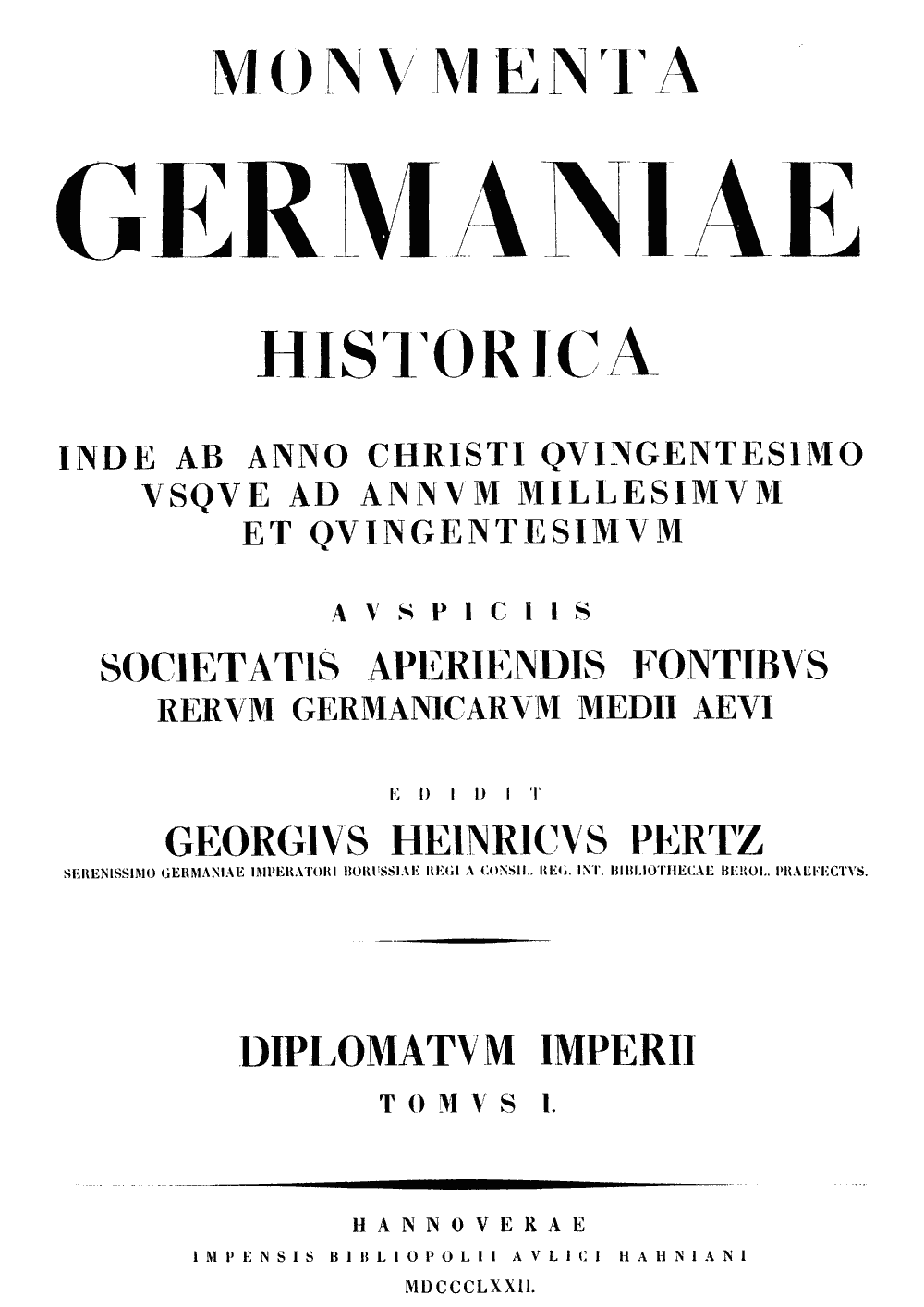
Monumenta Germaniae Historica

The Monumenta Germaniae Historica (Latin for "Historical Monuments of Germany"), frequently abbreviated MGH, is a comprehensive series of carefully edited and published primary sources, both chronicle and archival, for the study of parts of Northwestern, Central and Southern European history from the end of the Roman Empire to 1500.

Despite the name, the series covers important sources for the history of many countries besides Germany, since the Society for the Publication of Sources on Germanic Affairs of the Middle Ages has included documents from many other areas subjected to the influence of Germanic tribes or rulers (Britain, Czech lands, Poland, Austria, France, Low Countries, Italy, Spain, etc.).

== History ==
The MGH was founded in Hanover as a private text publication society by the Prussian reformer Heinrich Friedrich Karl Freiherr vom Stein in 1819. The first volume appeared in 1826. The editor from 1826 until 1874 was Georg Heinrich Pertz (1795–1876), who was succeeded by Georg Waitz (1813–1886).

Many eminent medievalists from Germany and, eventually, other countries, joined in the project of searching out and comparing manuscripts and producing scholarly editions. The motto chosen, Sanctus amor patriae dat animum ("Sacred love for the fatherland gives the spirit"), is explained as linking Romantic nationalism with professional scholarship.

In 1875, the MGH was established as a more formal institution with headquarters in Berlin.

In 1935, the organization was taken over by the state and renamed the Reichsinstitut für ältere deutsche Geschichtskunde ("National Institute for Older German History"). This was abolished in 1945, at the end of World War II.

The institute was later revived under its original name with the support of German institutions and the Austrian Academy of Sciences. The Monumenta Germaniae Historica Institute has been located in Munich since 1949 and possesses a large specialized library on the medieval history of Germany and Europe, including Church history, along with 130,000 monographs and approximately 150,000 dependent writings.

During the late 1940s, Margarete Kühn used her work on the MGH as cover for taking the Wiesbaden Codex from Soviet control in Dresden and having it returned to Eibingen and then to the State Library of Wiesbaden.

The MGH moved into its current premises in the building of the Bavarian State Library in 1967.

The project, a major effort of historical scholarship, continues in the 21st century. In 2004 the MGH, with the support of the Deutsche Forschungsgemeinschaft, made all of its publications in print for more than five years available online, in photo-digital reproduction, via a link on the MGH homepage.

== Divisions ==
The series falls into five main divisions, Antiquitates ("Antiquities"), Diplomata ("Documents"), Epistolae ("Letters"), Leges ("Laws"), and Scriptores ("Authors"), with an additional smaller division of Necrologia ("Necrology"). Many subsidiary series have also been established, including a series of more compact volumes for school use (Scriptores in usum scholarum) and special studies (MGH Schriften).

== See also ==
- Historiography of Germany
- Wilhelm Levison
