= Staatsbibliothek (disambiguation) =

Staatsbibliothek is the German word for "State (in the context of government) Library". It may refer to:

- Staatsbibliothek, the general concept
- Staatsbibliothek Bamberg, a library in Bavaria
- Staatsbibliothek zu Berlin, the Berlin State Library
- State libraries of Germany, the list of all Germany Staatsbibliotheks
