= Emeka Ogboh =

Nigerian artist (born 1977)

- Born: May 14, 1977 (age 48); Enugu, Nigeria
- Occupation: Artist
- Known for: Lagos soundscapes

Emeka Ogboh // (born May 14, 1977) is a Nigerian sound and installation artist best known for his soundscapes of life in Lagos. Trained as an artist, he began working with sounds that characterize cities following an Egyptian multimedia art program. He presents unmodified field recordings from Lagos city life in gallery installations with headphones and speakers. His non-audio work uses iconography from Lagos city life.

He participated in the DAAD Artists-in-Berlin Program and 2015 Venice Biennale, and received the 2016 Bremen Böttcherstraße Art Award. His work has been exhibited at the Brooklyn Museum, American National Museum of African Art, Menil Collection, Casino Luxembourg, and Kiasma.

== Early life and education ==
Ogboh was born in Enugu, Nigeria, on May 14, 1977.

He studied graphic design at University of Nigeria, Nsukka, and graduated in 2001.

== Work ==
Ogboh is a sound and video artist. He became interested in sound art during a media class at the 2008 Fayoum Winter Academy with Austrian multimedia artist Harald Scherz. Following this experience, Ogboh paid attention to the interaction of sounds in Lagos as compositions rather than individual voices. Ogboh compared the soundscapes to orchestra symphonies, with layered voices rather than strictly chaotic noise. He also appreciated the soundscape's ability to "transport the listener" and found the sound medium most engaging.

Ogboh's soundscapes of the Obalende bus park and Lagos Island Idumota Market

Ogboh's sound works have explored the audible expressions that characterize cities, particularly in Lagos, where he lives, works, and was affected by the city's fast pace and unpredictability. He has said that the city's intense, natural soundscapes are jarring for all visitors. OkayAfrica wrote that his work was "rich with sociopolitical commentary". In this way, the power blackout during the Nigerian 2014 FIFA World Cup game was not an angry crowd but an "honest commentary on the government's provision of resources". Ogboh has taken these Lagos recordings to museums around the world since 2008.

The danfo share taxi, illustrated in this video, is iconic of Lagos, Nigeria, and a recurrent figure in Ogboh's work.

He originally recorded Lagos for his use in-studio, but when presented with the idea of sharing the sound for artistic installation, he began to edit the clips for their best representation of Lagos and considered the best method of public dissemination. Home from his Egyptian art program, Ogboh was inspired to create the Lagos Soundscapes project when the artist was able to identify the sounds of his city during a phone call with a friend. As he transitioned to the field, he turned to online help in discussion forums and email. In his installations, Ogboh prefers audio that requires minimal studio manipulation, and does not significantly alter the sounds. Some audio effects come from the recording environment, both surfaces that echo and distort sound, and the effect of traveling with a recorder. His first sound installation was in the Fayoum academy's bathroom, followed by his first Lagos Soundscapes installation at the Lagos African Artists' Foundation in 2009. Ogboh remembered reception mostly around his work's novelty.

The works are typically installed in listening booths with headphones, though they were also installed in the public streets of Cologne and Helsinki as a commentary on globalization. His Lagos by Bus is a recording of Lagos passengers traveling the danfo share taxis and molue minibuses characteristic of the city to work. A vendor offers a prayer before selling medication to riders, as a sociopolitical protest song by Fela Kuti plays on the radio. The 40-minute installation was exhibited at Cologne's Rautenstrauch-Joest Museum in 2010, and the booth was painted yellow with black stripes and stickers to imitate the hallmarks of the danfo. An outdoor installation at the Cologne Public Library piped the streets of Lagos to those of Cologne. A similar installation took place at Helsinki's Kiasma contemporary art museum.

Ogboh hosted an online stream of his Lagos Soundscapes in collaboration with the Goethe Institut Lagos for the July 2013 World Listening Day. In a Houston installation at the Menil Collection, Ogboh installed a danfo bus, which he uses as a "spontaneous 'agora'" that carries a culture as Lagos's "most iconic symbol". He also created videos—Fractal Scapes—as abstracted "'time-based' paintings" of the city, and began collaborations with musicians who referred to Ogboh's Lagos recordings.

In 2014, his The Ambivalence of 1960 was featured in an exhibition at the Casino Luxembourg. The piece is a six-minute collage of speeches from Nigeria's 1960 independence festivities, including those of President Nnamdi Azikiwe, Prime Minister Sir Abubakar Tafawa Balewa, and English Princess Alexandra of Kent. Their aspirations for a human rights, freedom, religious tolerance, and economic development, compared with the present day, show Nigeria's political failures over the previous half-century. Ogboh visited New York City in September 2014 with his danfo share taxi, a symbol of public transport in Lagos, for a one-day installation (Lagos State of Mind II) at The Africa Center in Harlem. The installation included photos of the taxi with historic landmarks and African-American neighborhoods in New York City, juxtaposed against sounds situated in and out of the taxi. One of Ogboh's earlier works, Verbal Maps of Ojuelegba, features a Lagos danfo driver reciting the Ojuelegba route. The artist noted how hawking has been banned on Lagos's new roads and that the danfo share taxi will eventually disappear, along with their contribution to the city's soundscapes. This historical element was not an initial consideration in the project, though the artist planned for his future work to narrate the transformation of the city.

Ogboh participated in the title exhibit of the 2015 Venice Biennale, All the World's Futures, with The Song of the Germans (Deutschlandlied), a piece in which African refugees sang the German national anthem in their first languages. He had participated in the 2014 DAAD Artists-in-Berlin Program and exhibited in the city. Ogboh won the 2016 Bremen Böttcherstraße Art Award for his installation at the Kunsthalle Bremen. The piece, The Continental Entrée, refers to the advertisements of street food vendors and the European Union as a destination for African migrants with a neon sign that reads, "FOOD IS R€ADY". Later that year, Ogboh exhibited at the Brooklyn Museum's "Disguise: Masks and Global African Art" and the United States National Museum of African Art. At the former, he showed a 2015 sound installation, Egwutronica, of remixed Igbo music, and at the latter, his 28-minute soundscape of the Balogun Market (titled Market Symphony) was the museum's first sound art piece. Its audio played through speakers embedded in painted enamel trays, the same used to display goods at the market. In late 2016, his work was installed in the African Union's Julius Nyerere Peace and Security Building in Addis Ababa.

Ogboh's work The Way Earthly Things Are Going was installed at Tate Modern in 2017. Shortly afterwards, he was shortlisted for the 2018 Hugo Boss Prize.

In August 2019, a site-specific installation entitled Ámà: The Gathering Place debuted at the Cleveland Museum of Art. The installation, which features a soundscape and a large textile-covered sculpted tree, is meant to evoke daily life in an Igbo village. In September, 2020, when most art spaces in Berlin were closed due to the Covid-19 pandemic, Ogboh was invited to participate in an exhibition project called Studio Berlin, located at the famed nightclub Berghain in Berlin.

Ogboh is currently represented by Galerie Imane Farès, after a long stint as a "willingly unrepresented artist".

== Reception ==
Art historian and curator Ugochukwu-Smooth Nzewi described Ogboh's work as capturing "the maddening hyper-visuality of Lagos". Ogboh was among Nzewi's most anticipated artists at the 2014 contemporary African art festival 1:54. In 2013, Ogboh reported reception of his Lagos Soundscapes as mixed: annoying some and intriguing others. Quiet European cities have considered the work "noisy and obtrusive", in one case destroying a speaker and calling the police on the installation. The artist appreciated the installation's effect on Nigerians abroad, and how being in earshot of the soundscape confused them in their foreign environment. Art historian Carol Magee noted how even in the business of the Lagos Soundscapes, she felt a stillness in which her attention was focused and the patterns unchanging despite the cacophony of the scene. Malawian visual artist Massa Lemu described Ogboh's work as embodying Afropolitanism, in which African cities were representative of a busy, globalized world and its multiple cultures centralized in one place. Lemu thought of Ogboh's soundscapes as "auditory landscapes" that recreate a sense of the Lagos environment. He additionally compared Ogboh's practice with that of sound artists James Webb (South Africa) and Magdi Mostafa (Egypt), though these two tend to manipulate their recordings where Ogboh instead recontextualizes the original. For this reason, Lemu considered Ogboh's work to be closer in lineage to John Cage's recontextualized found sounds than the practice of El Anatsui or Romuald Hazoume recycling found objects as commentary on economic conditions.
