= Gleiberg =

Gleiberg may refer to:

- The Gleiberg volcano, in Hesse, Germany
- Krofdorf-Gleiberg, a settlement in Hesse, Germany
- Gerberga of Gleiberg (970 - 1036?), a German noblewoman
