= List of compositions by Hildegard of Bingen =

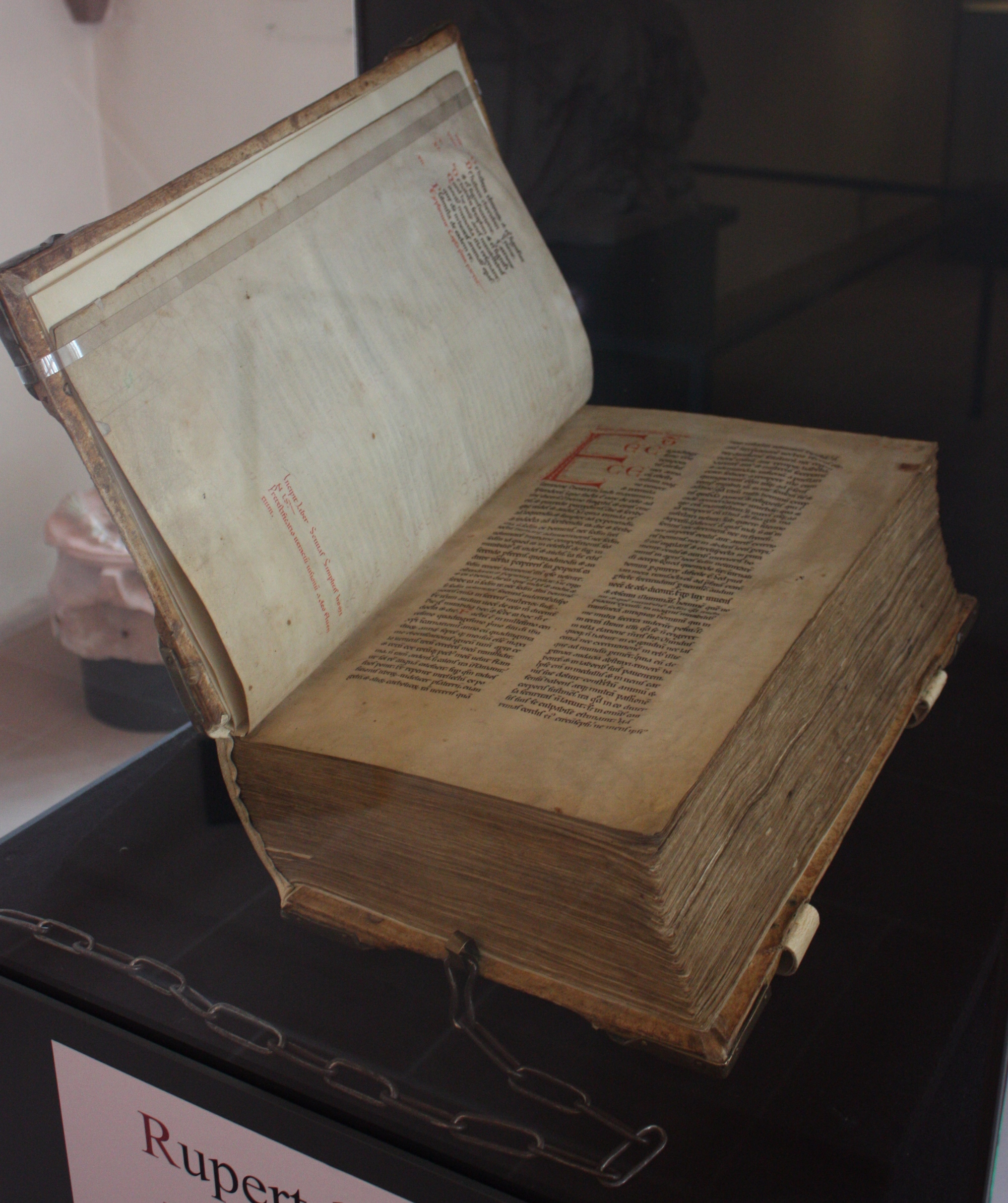
The Wiesbaden Codex, one of Hildegard of Bingen's two major collections of work

The German Benedictine abbess Hildegard of Bingen is among the most important medieval composers. She is the earliest known woman composer in Western classical music, and an important exponent of sacred music during the High Middle Ages.

== List of compositions ==
All works are vocal, monophonic and with Latin text

List of compositions by Hildegard of Bingen
Work Title	Genre	Feast	B-DEa MS 9		D-WIl Hs. 2	
Work Title	Genre	Feast	No.	Folios	No.	Folios
O vis eternitatis	Responsory	—	—	—	R 1	466
O magne Pater	Antiphon	—	D 1	153r	R 2	466
O eterne Deus	Antiphon	—	D 2	153r	R 3	466
O virtus Sapientie	Antiphon	—	—	—	R 4	466
O quam mirabilis	Antiphon	—	—	—	R 5	466–466ª
O pastor animarum	Antiphon	—	—	—	R 6	466ª
O cruor sanguinis	Antiphon	—	—	—	R 7	466ª
Spiritus sanctus vivificans vita	Antiphon	—	D 15	157r	R 8	466ª
Karitas habundat	Antiphon	—	D 16	157r	R 9	466ª
O splendidissima gemma	Antiphon	—	D 5	154r–v	R 10	466ª
O tu illustrata	Antiphon (with verse)	—	—	—	R 11	466ª–467
Hodie nunc aperuit nobis	Antiphon	—	D 6	154v	R 12	467
Quia ergo femina	Antiphon	—	D 7	154v	R 13	467
Cum processit	Antiphon	—	D 8	154v	R 14	467
Cum erubuerint	Antiphon	—	D 9	155r	R 15	467
O quam magnum miraculum	Antiphon	—	D 11	155r–v	R 16	467–467ª
Ave Maria O auctrix	Responsory	—	D 3	153r–v	R 17	467ª
O clarissima mater	Responsory	—	D 4	153v–154r	R 18	467ª–468
O tu suavissima	Responsory	—	D 14	156v	R 19	468
O quam preciosa	Responsory	—	—	—	R 20	468
O gloriosissimi lux vivens angeli	Antiphon	—	D 20	159r	R 21	468–468ª
O vos angeli	Responsory	Angels	D 21	159r–v	R 22	468ª
O spectabiles viri	Antiphon	Prophets, patron saints	D 22	159v–160r	R 23	468ª–469
O vos felices radices	Antiphon	Patron saints, prophets	D 23	160r–v	R 24	469
O cohors milite floris	Antiphon	Apostles	D 24	160v–161r	R 25	469–469ª
O lucidissima apostolorum	Responsory	Apostles	D 25	161r–v	R 26	469ª
O speculum columbe	Antiphon	St John the Evangelist	D 26	161v	R 27	469ª
O dulcis electe	Responsory	St John the Evangelist	D 27	161v–162r	R 28	469ª–470
O victoriosissimi	Antiphon	Martyrs	D 31	163r–v	R 29	470
Vos flores rosarum	Responsory	Martyrs	D 32	163v	R 30	470
O vos imitatores excelse	Responsory	Confessors	D 33	163v–164r	R 31	470
O successores fortissimi	Antiphon	Confessors	D 34	164r	R 32	470ª
O mirum admirandum	Antiphon	St Disibod	D 28	162r	R 33	470ª
O viriditas digiti Dei	Responsory	St Disibod	D 29	162r–v	R 34	470ª
O felix anima	Responsory	St Disibod	—	—	R 35	470ª
O beata infantia	Antiphon	St Disibod	—	—	R 36	470ª–471
O felix aparitio	Antiphon	St Rupert	D 35	164v	R 37	471
O beatissime Ruperte	Antiphon	St Rupert	D 36	164v	R 38	471
Quia felix pueritia	Antiphon	St Rupert	—	—	R 39	471
O pulcre facies Deum	Antiphon	—	D 38	165r	R 40	471
O nobilissima viriditas	Responsory	Virgins	D 39	165r–v	R 41	471–471ª
Spriritui sancto	Responsory	—	D 45	167r	R 42	471ª
Favus distillans	Responsory	—	D 43	167v	R 43	471ª
O rubor sanguinis	Gospel antiphon	—	D 44	167v	R 44	471ª
Studium divinitatis	Laudes antiphon	—	D 46	167v	R 45	471ª–472
Unde quocumque	Antiphon	—	D 47	167v	R 46	472
De patria etiam earum	Antiphon	—	D 48	168r	R 47	472
Deus enim in prima	Antiphon	—	D 49	168r	R 48	472
Aer enim volat	Antiphon	—	D 50	168r	R 49	472
Et ideo puelle iste	Gospel antiphon	—	D 51	168r	R 50	472
Deus enim rorem	Antiphon	—	D 52	168r	R 51	472
Sed diabolus	Antiphon	—	D 53	168r–v	R 52	472
Rex noster promptus est	Responsory	Holy Innocents	D 42	166v–167r	R 53	472
O virgo Ecclesia	Antiphon	—	D 56	170r	R 54	472–472ª
Nunc gaudeant materna	Antiphon	Church dedication	D 57	170r–v	R 55	472ª
O orzchis ecclesia	Antiphon	Church dedication	—	—	R 56	472ª
O coruscans lux stellarum	Antiphon	—	—	—	R 57	472ª
Kyrie eleison	Kyrie	—	—	—	R 58	472ª
O ignis Spiritus Paraclitus	Sequence	—	D 19	158r–v	R 59	473
O ignee Spiritus	Hymn	—	D 18	157v–158r	R 60	473–473ª
Alleluia, O virga mediatrix	Allelui	—	—	—	R 61	473ª
O virga ac diadema	Sequence	—	D 13	156r	R 62	473ª–474
O viridissima virga	Antiphon	—	—	—	R 63	474–474ª
Ave generosa	Hymn	—	D 12	155v	R 64	474ª
Mathias sanctus	Hymn	—	—	—	R 65	474ª–475
O Bonifaci lux vivens	Antiphon	St Boniface	—	—	R 66	475–475ª
O presul vere civitatis	Sequence	St Disibod	D 30	162v–163r	R 67	475ª
O Euchari columba	Responsory	St Eucharius	—	—	R 68	475ª–476
O Euchari in leta via	Sequence	St Eucharius	—	—	R 69	476
Columba aspexit	Sequence	St Maximinus	—	—	R 70	476–476ª
O Jerusalem aurea civitas	Sequence	St Rupert	D 37	164v	R 71	476ª–477
O ecclesia oculi tui	Sequence	—	D 54	168v–169r	R 72	477–477ª
Cum vox sanguinis	Hymn	—	D 55	169r–170r	R 73	477ª–478
O dulcissime amator	Symphonia	Virgins	D 40	165v–166r	R 74	478–478ª
O Pater omnium	Symphonia	Widows	D 41	166r–v	R 75	478ª
Ordo virtutum	Liturgical drama	—	—	—	—	478ª–481ª
O frondens virga	Antiphon	—	D 10	155r	—	—
Laus Trinitati	Antiphon	—	D 17	157r	—	—
