= Wiesbaden Codex =

12th-century codex

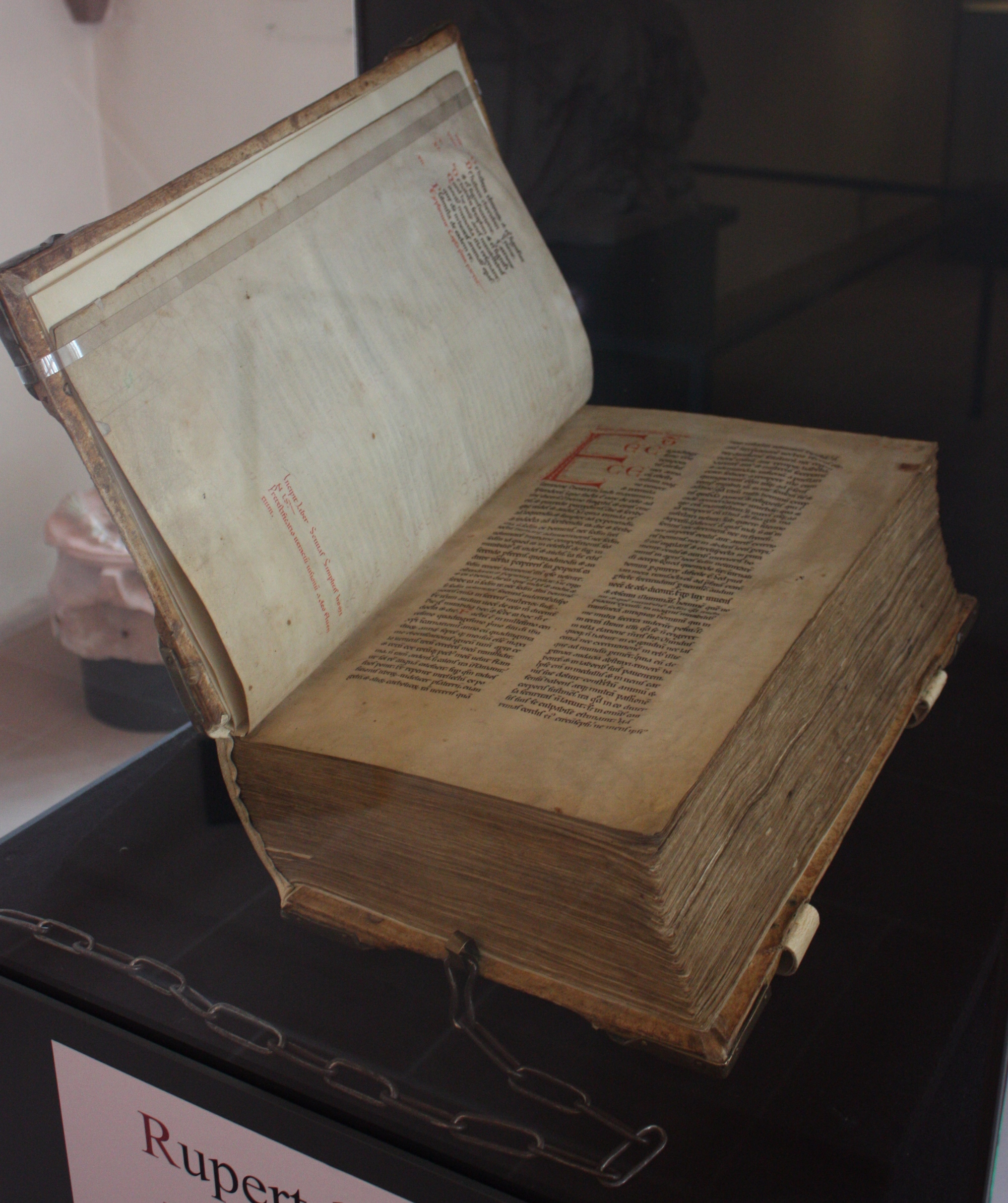

The Wiesbaden Codex (also Riesencodex "giant codex"), Hs.2 of the Hessische Landesbibliothek, Wiesbaden, is a codex containing the collected works of Hildegard of Bingen. It is a giant codex, weighing 15 kg and 30 by 45 cm in size. It dates from c. 1200, and was started at the end of her life or just after her death, at the instigation of Guibert of Gembloux, her final secretary. The only segment of her work missing from the codex are her medical writings, which may never have existed in a finished format.

The codex contains an extensive collection of her letters. According to scholar Lieven Van Acker, Hildegard in her last days agreed to the changes made by her editors in the collection. The format was designed by her first secretary, Volmar, and was edited heavily by Guibert of Gembloux; nonetheless, she apparently authorized the changes.

The work was completed at Rupertsberg and was kept there for most of its life.

== Times of risk ==
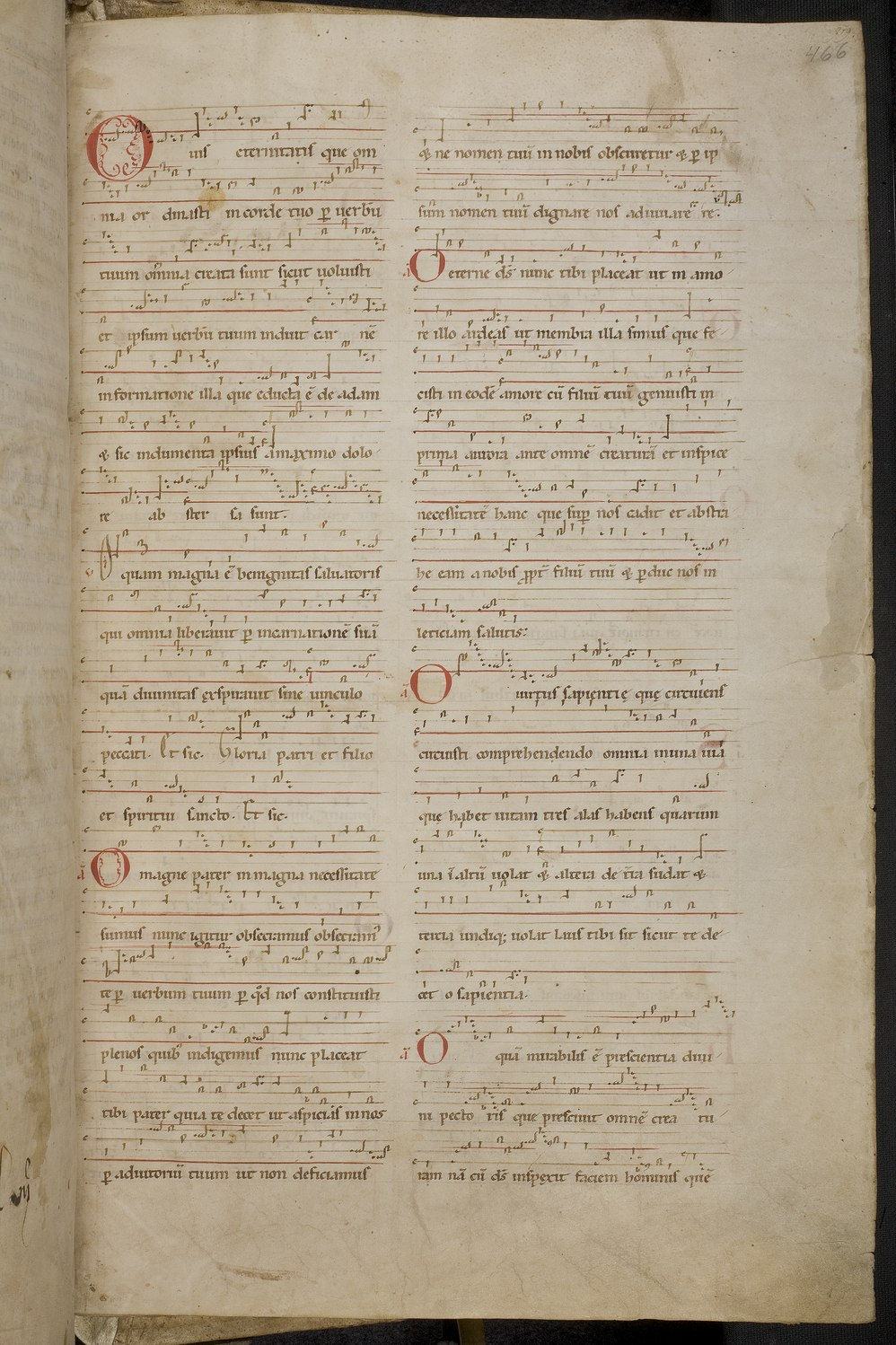
Page from the codex, 1180 - 1190

The Riesencodex was almost lost several times.

The nuns of Rupertsberg fled with the codex to Eibingen when Swedish troops looted the monastery during the Thirty Years War.

In 1814, the codex was relocated to the State Library of Wiesbaden due to secularisation.

During the Second World War, the codex was sent to Dresden for safety. It survived the Dresden firebombing inside a bank vault, and unlike another work by Bingen stored there, the Scivias, was not looted.

The Soviet Administration took the codex as property of the state after the war. After failed requests for its return to the State Library, in 1948, the Library director Franz Götting and medieval scholar Margarete Kühn made a plan to return the codex. Using Margarete's reputation as a scholar and work on the Monumenta Germaniae Historica she was able to photograph the codex and have it delivered by Caroline Walsh, the wife of an American soldier, to Eibingen, where they then switched it with a book of similar dimensions and weight.

After the Soviets realized the switch in 1950, a deal was struck where in exchange for other rare books being sent to Dresden, Wiesbaden was able to keep the codex.

== See also ==
- Dendermonde Codex
