= State libraries of Germany =

This is a list of the state libraries (German: Landesbibliothek) for each of the Länder of the Federal Republic of Germany. These libraries hold the right for legal deposit for the publications in their respective state.

== Landesbibliothek ==
Image	Library Name	German State	City
	Badische Landesbibliothek	Baden-Württemberg	Karlsruhe
	Württembergische Landesbibliothek	Baden-Württemberg	Stuttgart
	Bavarian State Library	Bavaria	Munich
	Berlin Central and Regional Library	Berlin	Berlin
	Stadt- und Landesbibliothek Potsdam	Brandenburg	Potsdam
	Staats- und Universitätsbibliothek Bremen	Bremen	Bremen
	Staatsbibliothek Hamburg	Hamburg	Hamburg
	Wiesbaden State Library	Hesse	Wiesbaden
	University and State Library Darmstadt	Hesse	Darmstadt
	Göttingen State and University Library	Lower Saxony	Göttingen
	Landesbibliothek und Murhardsche Bibliothek der Stadt Kassel	Hesse	Kassel
	Oldenburg State Library	Lower Saxony	Oldenburg
	Landesbibliothek Mecklenburg-Vorpommern	Mecklenburg-Vorpommern	Schwerin
	University Library of Bonn	North Rhine-Westphalia	Bonn
	Universitäts- und Landesbibliothek Düsseldorf	North Rhine-Westphalia	Düsseldorf
	Stadt- und Landesbibliothek Dortmund	North Rhine-Westphalia	Dortmund
	Universitäts- und Landesbibliothek Münster	North Rhine-Westphalia	Münster
	Pfälzische Landesbibliothek	Rhineland-Palatinate	Speyer
	Rheinische Landesbibliothek	Rhineland-Palatinate	Koblenz
	Saarländische Universitäts- und Landesbibliothek	Saarland	Saarbrücken
	Saxon State Library	Saxony	Dresden
	Universitäts- und Landesbibliothek Sachsen-Anhalt	Saxony-Anhalt	Halle (Saale)
	Eutiner Landesbibliothek	Schleswig-Holstein	Eutin
	Schleswig-Holsteinische Landesbibliothek	Schleswig-Holstein	Kiel
	Thüringer Universitäts- und Landesbibliothek	Thuringia	Jena

== Staatsbibliothek ==
The historic National Libraries of the former Kingdoms, now States of Germany (Länder), are called Staatsbibliothek (state libraries). Among the libraries named Staatsbibliothek are:

- the Bavarian State Library (Bayerische Staatsbibliothek or BSB) in Munich, one of the world's largest libraries and the former library of the Kingdom of Bavaria
- the Bamberg State Library (Staatsbibliothek Bamberg), a library in Bamberg, Bavaria
- the Berlin State Library (Staatsbibliothek zu Berlin), the largest academic library in the German language and former library of the Kingdom of Prussia
- the Göttingen State and University Library (Niedersächsische Staats- und Universitätsbibliothek Göttingen) is among other things the Staatsbibliothek of Lower Saxony
- the Saxon State Library (Sächsische Landesbibliothek − Staats- und Universitätsbibliothek Dresden) is among other things the Staatsbibliothek of Saxony and the former Royal Library of the Dukes of Saxony

== Stadtbibliothek ==
Stadtbibliothek ("City Library") refers to a major city library. All major cities in German-speaking countries have these and some also have legal deposit requirements. Large Stadtbibliothek include:

- Berlin City Library (Stadtbibliothek Berlin), with legal deposit for the city of Berlin.
- Cologne Public Library (Stadtbibliothek Köln), is among the biggest and most important public libraries in Germany.
- Stadtbibliothek Braunschweig, in Braunschweig
- Stadtbibliothek Bremen, in Bremen
- Stadtbibliothek Mainz, in Mainz
- Stadtbibliothek Hannover, in Hannover
- Wiener Stadtbibliothek, the library in Vienna

== See also ==
- List of libraries in Austria
- List of libraries in Germany
- Liechtensteinische Landesbibliothek
