= Ugochukwu-Smooth Nzewi =

Nigerian artist

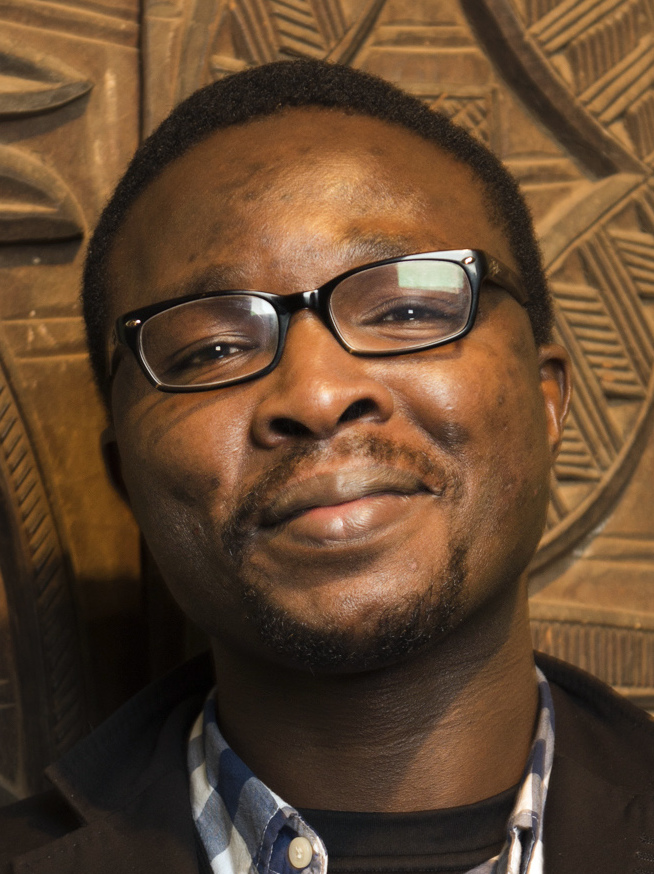
- Nzewi in 2013
- Born: Nigeria
- Occupations: Artist, art historian, curator

Ugochukwu-Smooth C. Nzewi is a Nigerian artist, art historian, and curator, currently curator in the Department of Painting and Sculpture at Museum of Modern Art in New York City. He was raised in Enugu and studied under sculptor El Anatsui at the University of Nigeria, Nsukka, before traveling as an artist and curator. In the United States, he completed his doctorate at Emory University in 2013 and became the curator of African art at Dartmouth College's Hood Museum of Art. In 2017, he moved to the Cleveland Museum of Art. Nzewi has curated the Nigerian Afrika Heritage Biennial three times, the Dak'Art biennial in 2014, and independent exhibitions at Atlanta's High Museum of Art and New York's Richard Taittinger Gallery. Nzewi also exhibited internationally as an artist and artist-in-resident.

== Early life and education ==
Nzewi was born in Nigeria and raised in Enugu. He studied sculpture under El Anatsui at the University of Nigeria, Nsukka, and received a bachelor's degree in fine and applied art in 2001.

== Career ==
After graduating, Nzewi traveled internationally for six years as an independent artist and curator, and was involved in the curation of three iterations of the Afrika Heritage Biennial. In 2006, Nzewi moved to Cape Town, South Africa, where he worked on a yearlong postgraduate program in Museum and Heritage Studies at the University of Western Cape while serving as an artist-in-residence at the Greatmore Studio in Woodstock, Cape Town.

The next year, 2007, Nzewi moved to Atlanta, Georgia, and began a doctorate degree in art history at Emory University. During his doctoral years, he curated at Atlanta's High Museum (2009) and received Robert Sterling Clark and Smithsonian fellowships. He wrote his dissertation on the Dak'Art biennial's influence on contemporary African art, and graduated in May 2013.

As an artist, Nzewi has participated in shows and residencies in Africa, Europe, and the United States. He has collaborated with Emeka Ogboh, whom he met in college. Under the moniker One-Room Shack, the pair prepared an installation for the Watermans Arts Centre in 2012 in which visitors walk through interconnected letters that spell "UNITY", a reflection on the Olympic spirit.

In August 2013, Nzewi became the Dartmouth College Hood Museum of Art's first curator of African art, where he mounted shows on Eric Van Hove and Ekpe textiles. After four years, Nzewi left Dartmouth to become the Cleveland Museum of Art's curator of African art.

In addition, Nzewi served among the three curators of the 2014 Dak'Art biennial, which focused on themes of globalization (expressed through African ideas of communalism) and anonymity. Dak'Art had served as important link between the African and international art world, and Nzewi helped to situate the show's own role in developing "pan-African internationalism". In mid-2015, Nzewi curated a monthlong survey of African art at the Richard Taittinger Gallery in New York. The show was named after the 1967 comedy-drama film Guess Who's Coming to Dinner. In late 2016, Nzewi served as a guest curator at the Shanghai Biennale.

=== MoMA, 2019–present ===
In 2019, Nzewi was appointed Steven and Lisa Tananbaum Curator in the Department of Painting and Sculpture at the New York Museum of Modern Art.

In 2023, Nzewi was part of the selection committee that nominated Zasha Colah as artistic director of the Berlin Biennale in 2025.

Among his considerations as a curator, Nzewi cites the importance of art history and his curiosity in how artworks reveal collective social imagination through expression and interpretation. He has expressed interest in learning from the creative process as artists make intellectual decisions about their work on reflection of how it will be received by others and the market. He has published essays in multiple academic art journals, contributed to Grove Art Online, and co-edited a volume on independent African art initiatives.
