= Sackpfeife (mountain) =

Mountain in Germany

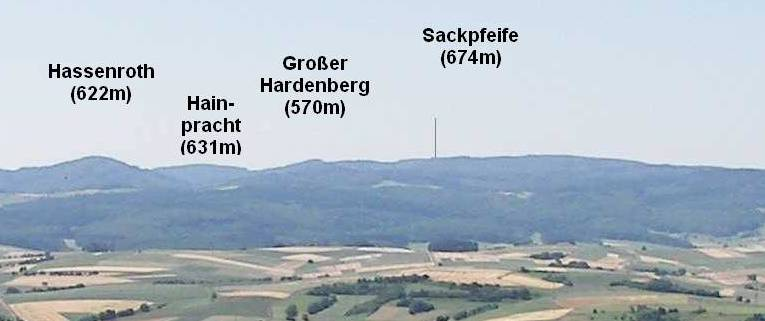
- The Sackpfeife and the Großer Hardenberg (570 m), Hainpracht (631.0 m) and Hassenroth (621.6 m) seen from Christenberg in the Burgwald. Foreground: the Wetschaft Basin

Highest point
- Elevation: 673.3 m above sea level (NHN) (2,209 ft)
- Isolation: 8 km
- Coordinates: 50°57′19″N 8°32′19″E

Geography
- Location within Hesse
- Location: between Hatzfeld and Biedenkopf; counties of Waldeck-Frankenberg and Marburg-Biedenkopf; Hesse, Germany
- Parent range: Rothaar

The Sackpfeife is a mountain, 673.3 m above sea level (NHN),, in the Rothaar Mountains on the boundary of the counties of Waldeck-Frankenberg and Marburg-Biedenkopf in the German state of Hesse.

On top of the forested mountain, which is a well known and popular recreation area, are the Emperor William II Tower, which offers views over the Rothaar highlands, the Biedenkopf Transmitter and a ski lift.

== Geography ==
=== Location ===
The Sackpfeife rises in the southern Rothaar Mountains in the western part of the state of Hesse on the border between the counties of Waldeck-Frankenberg to the north and Marburg-Biedenkopf to the south. It lies east of the Wittgensteiner Land in the extensive woodlands of Hatzfeld Forest between Hatzfeld in the north and Biedenkopf in the south.

Although the Sackpfeife is not one of the highest mountains in the Rothaar, whose summits reach 843.2 m, it towers prominently above its immediate surroundings and has a topographic isolation of about 8 km. Because the summit region is extremely wide in the direction of the range (north-northeast) its highest point lies clearly within the parish of Hatzfeld and thus in the county of Waldeck-Frankenberg, but, for example the site of the Biedenkopf Transmitter is in the borough of Biedenkopf at a height of 665 m, just under that of the main summit. Hence the Sackpfeife is also the highest mountain in Marburg-Biedenkopf and is marketed by the Biedenkopf Municipal Development Company to that end, whilst Waldeck-Frankenberg has clearly higher mountains in the Upland.

The Sackpfeife is accessible by car on a no-through road between Hatzfeld-Eifa and Biedenkopf that branches off the Bundesstraße 253.

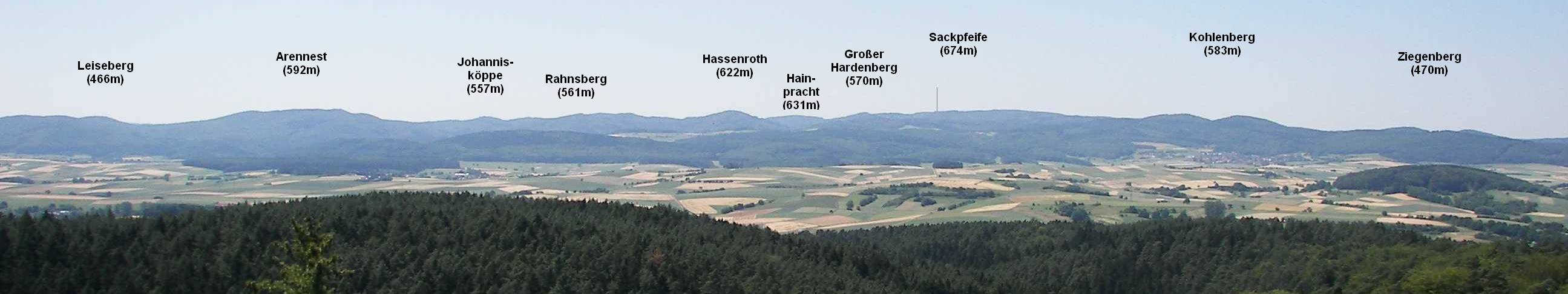
View from the Christenberg in the Burgwald of the Sackpfeife and its subpeaks: the Kohlenberg (583 m, half-right, twin-tops), Sackpfeife (673.3 m, centre right, with transmitter mast), Hainpracht (631.0 m, left rear), Hassenroth (621.6 m, centre, domed) and Arennest (591.5 m, second half-left)
