= Danfo =

Lagos informal minibus system

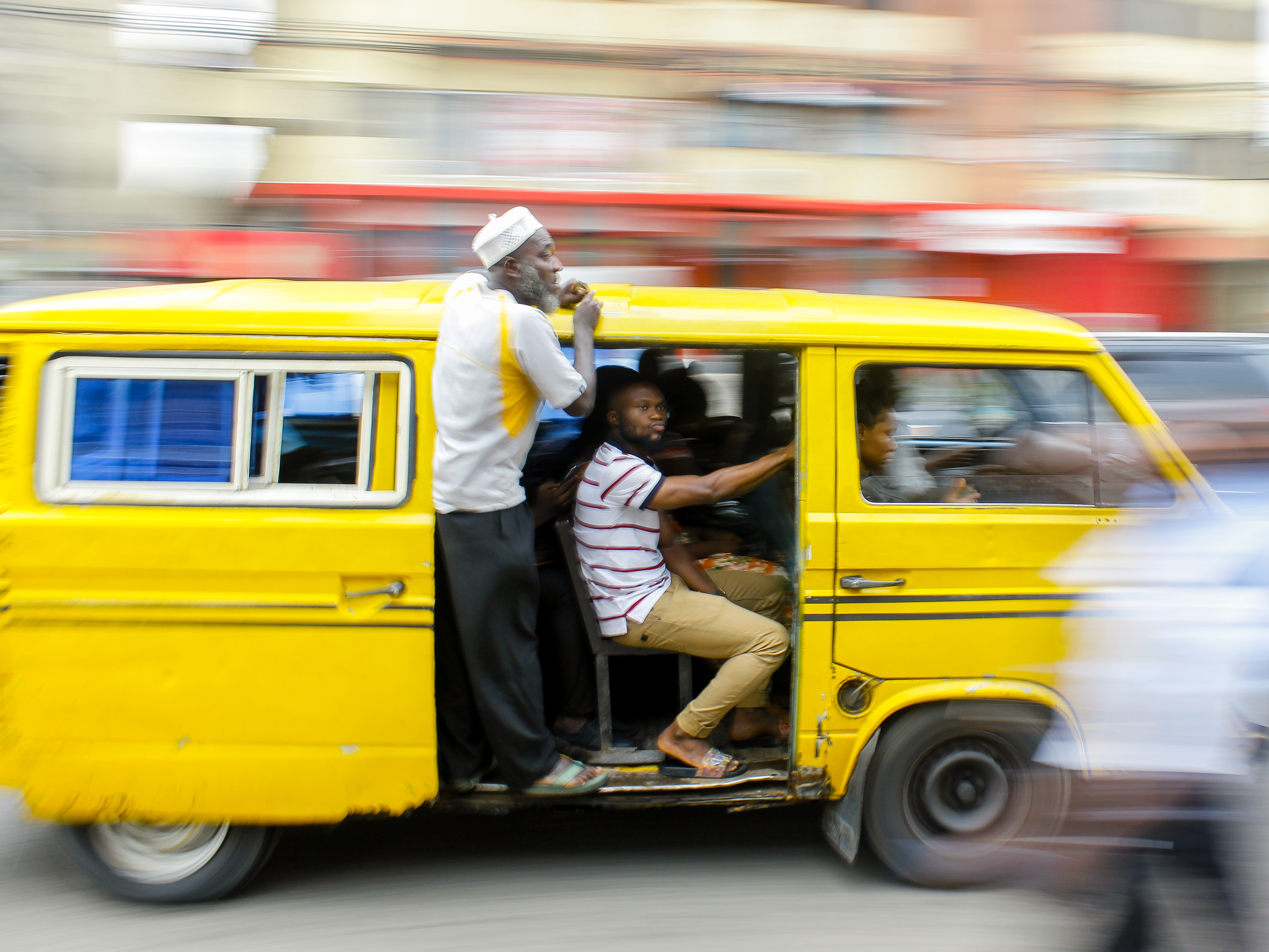
- Yellow Danfo minibus operating in Lagos

Overview
- Manufacturer: Various (commonly Volkswagen Transporter derivatives)
- Production: 1960s–present

Body and chassis
- Class: Minibus

Powertrain
- Capacity: 14–18 passengers

Danfo are yellow minibuses used as a form of informal public transport in Lagos, Nigeria. Typically seating between 14 and 18 passengers, Danfo buses operate on semi-fixed urban routes and constitute a major component of the city's transport system. Studies indicate that Danfo minibuses account for a significant share of daily motorized trips in Lagos and are widely used by low- and middle-income commuters.

== History ==
Danfo minibuses emerged in Lagos during the 1970s following the decline of state-operated transport services. Early vehicles were commonly based on imported Volkswagen Type 2 vans adapted for passenger use. The term “danfo” is believed to derive from the Yoruba word meaning “hurry,” reflecting the fast-paced nature of their operations.

By the 1980s and 1990s, Danfo minibuses had become a dominant feature of Lagos streets, filling gaps left by limited formal transport infrastructure.

== Operations ==
Danfo buses are typically privately owned and operated, often under the supervision of transport unions such as the National Union of Road Transport Workers. Vehicles usually run on established corridors between major terminals, commonly referred to as parks, while allowing flexible boarding and drop-off points.

Fares are traditionally paid in cash, with conductors collecting payments during transit. In recent years, the Lagos State Government has introduced pilot schemes for electronic ticketing as part of broader transport reforms.

== Routes and usage ==
Danfo minibuses operate across major corridors in Lagos, connecting residential and commercial districts. They often serve areas not fully covered by formal systems such as the Bus Rapid Transit (BRT), providing first- and last-mile connectivity.

Research indicates that informal transport systems, including Danfo buses, account for a substantial proportion of urban mobility in Lagos.

== Economic role ==
The Danfo transport system provides employment for thousands of drivers, conductors, mechanics, and support workers, forming a significant segment of Lagos’s informal economy.

Studies have identified operational challenges including fuel costs, maintenance expenses, and regulatory levies, as well as interactions with traffic enforcement agencies.

== Regulation and reforms ==
Efforts to regulate and modernize Danfo operations have been undertaken by the Lagos State Government. In 2017, plans were announced to phase out Danfo buses in favor of higher-capacity alternatives, though these proposals were later revised.

The Lagos Bus Reform Initiative, introduced in 2019, seeks to integrate informal transport systems into a more structured framework. Under this initiative, Danfo operators may continue operating provided they meet safety and inspection requirements.

Policies introduced in the 2020s include vehicle inspection standards, driver training programs, and proposals for fleet modernization through replacement schemes.

== Safety and controversies ==
Danfo minibuses have been associated with safety concerns, including traffic violations, overloading, and road accidents. Media reports have documented incidents involving Danfo vehicles.

Passenger experiences have also been examined in studies, including reports of harassment in public transport contexts.

Conflicts involving transport unions and enforcement agencies have also been reported.

== Cultural significance ==
Danfo minibuses are widely regarded as symbols of urban life in Lagos. Their distinctive yellow-and-black appearance has made them a recognizable feature of the city’s identity and they are frequently depicted in media and popular culture.

== Current developments ==
Despite modernization efforts, Danfo buses continue to play a central role in Lagos transport. Government strategies increasingly focus on integrating informal systems into broader urban mobility frameworks while improving safety and efficiency standards.
