= Christenberg =

Mountain in Hesse, Germany

Coordinates: 50°57′17″N 8°44′57″E

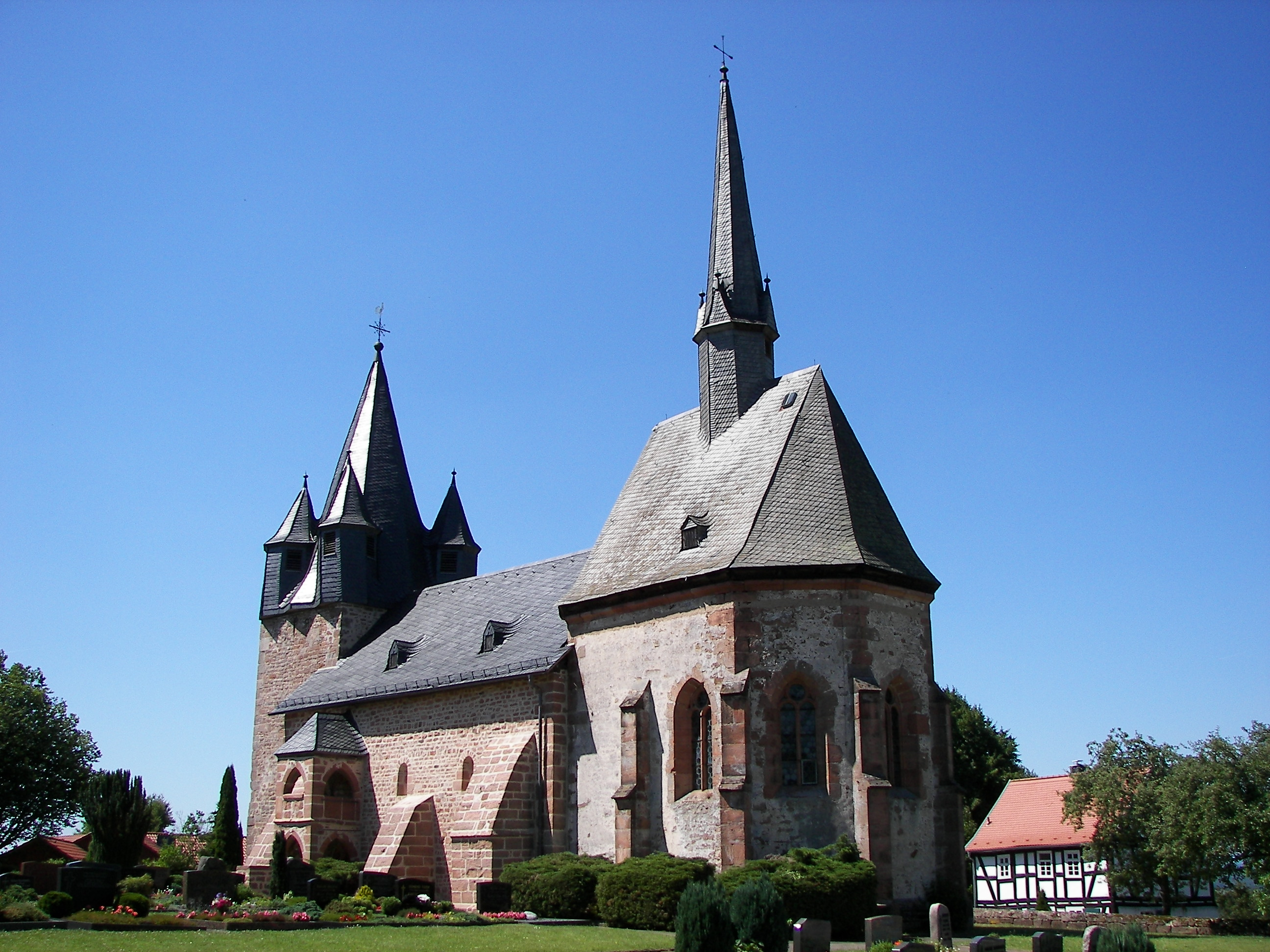
- Burgwald Christenberg

Highest point
- Elevation: 387 m (1,270 ft)

Geography
- Location: Hesse, Germany

Christenberg is a hill in Hesse, Germany.
