= Margarete Kühn =

German author and art historian (1902–1995)

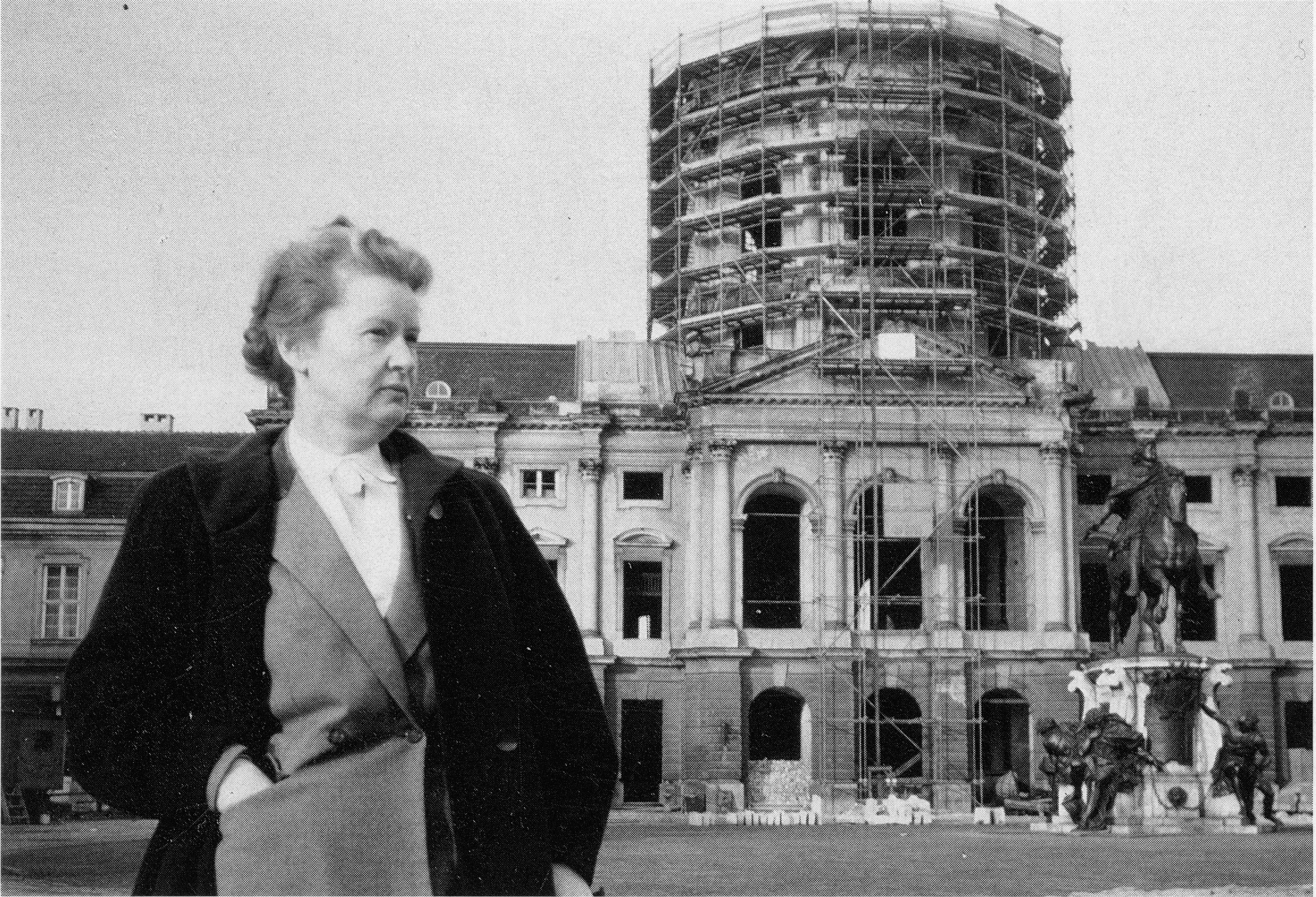
- Margarete Kühn in front of Charlottenburg Palace during reconstruction, 1953
- Born: February 4, 1902
- Died: September 12, 1995 (aged 93)
- Occupation: Medieval scholar

Margarete Kühn (4 February 1902 – 12 September 1995) was a German author and art historian. She was the first director of the State Palaces and Gardens Administration in Berlin. She made significant efforts for the preservation of the Berlin Palace and the reconstruction of the Charlottenburg Palace during the post-war period.

== Biography ==
Margarete Kühn was born on 4 February 1902 in Lütgendortmund, Germany. She studied natural sciences in Munich, but later changed to art history. She also studied in Vienna and Leipzig. In 1928 she received her doctorate in Munich. She joined as an assistant at the Prussian Palace Administration in 1929 and later she became a research assistant at the same institute.

=== Berlin Palace and Charlottenburg ===
From 1935 Kühn started working with Ernst Gall (1888–1958), then director of the Prussian Palace Administration, and was responsible for Charlottenburg Palace. During the division of Berlin, Kühn protested unsuccessfully against the evacuation of the Berlin Palace by the German People's Police. Following the demolition of the palace by East Berlin magistrate, Kühn and Hinnerk Scheper, the state curator of Berlin, moved their office to West Berlin.

Afterwards a new office of West Berlin Palaces administration was established at Charlottenburg Palace, named as the State Palaces and Gardens Administration. At the end of the war, Kühn became the first director of the State Palaces and Gardens Administration in Berlin and was involved in the reconstruction of the damaged Charlottenburg Palace. She held the office of director until her retirement in 1969. Following her retirement, Martin Sperlich succeeded her as director and continued the reconstruction of Charlottenburg Palace until his retirement in 1984.

Kühn published number of books about Charlottenburg Palace and other Berlin monuments.

=== Later life ===
Kühn continued to research and work in the field of medieval studies. Between 1958 and 1974 she served as an editor of the journal for art history. From 1962 to 1995, she edited the works of Karl Friedrich Schinkel.

She died on 12 September 1995 in Berlin.

== Awards ==
Kühn was awarded the Great Federal Cross of Merit and the Ernst Reuter Plaque.

In 2005, to recognize her efforts for the reconstruction of Charlottenburg Palace, a street in Charlottenburg was named after her.

== See also ==
- Prussian Palaces and Gardens Foundation Berlin-Brandenburg
