= Bamberg State Library =

Research library in Bamberg, Bavaria, Germany

- Staatsbibliothek Bamberg
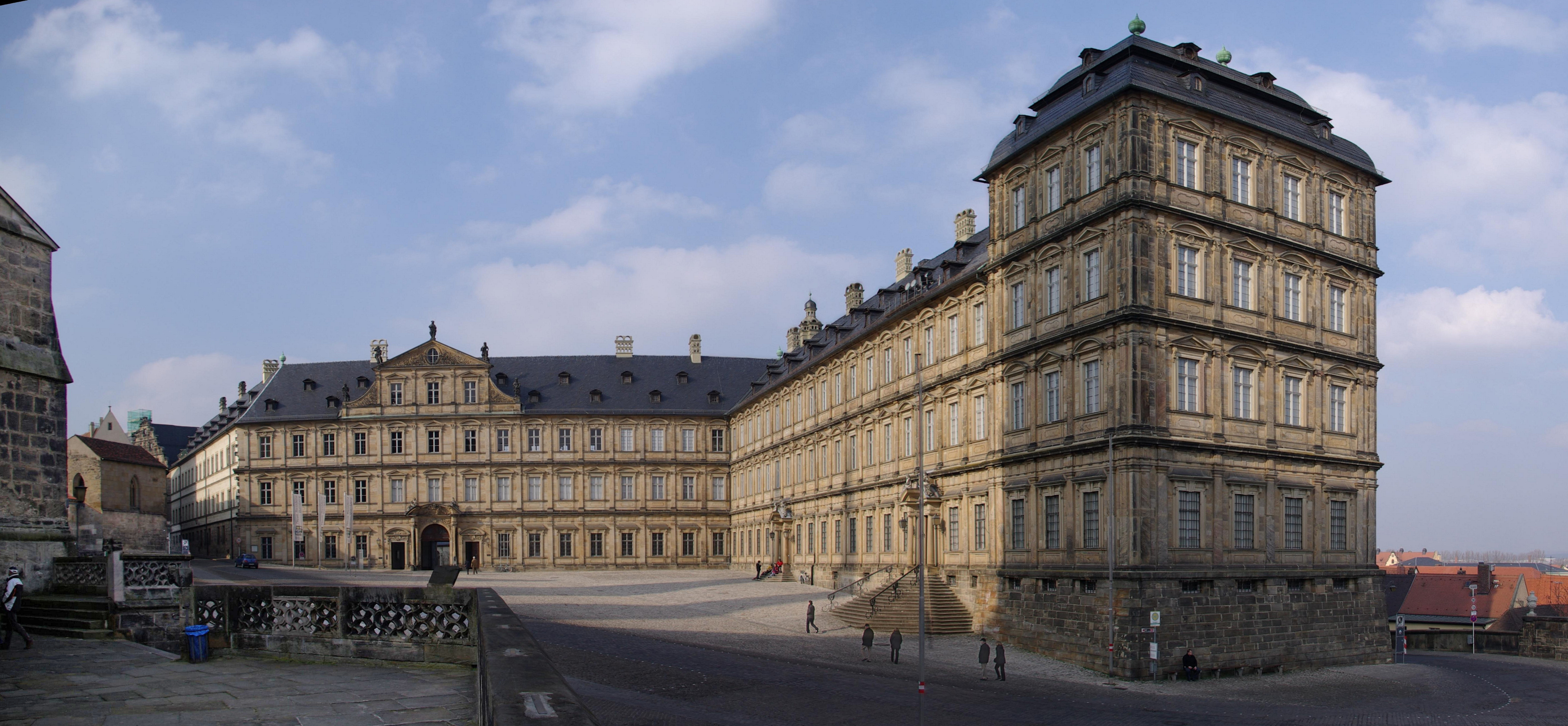
- The Bamberg State Library in the New Residence
- 49°53′30″N 10°52′56″E
- Location: Neue Residenz, Domplatz 8, 96049 Bamberg, Federal Republic of Germany, Germany
- Type: Regional library, research library
- Established: September 9, 1803

Collection
- Size: more than 566,000 volumes
- Legal deposit: Upper Franconia (since 1987)

Other information
- Director: Bettina Wagner
- Website: www.staatsbibliothek-bamberg.de

The Bamberg State Library (German: Staatsbibliothek Bamberg) is a combined universal, regional and research library with priority given to the humanities. Today it is housed in the New Residence, the former prince-bishop's new palace. The Free State of Bavaria is responsible for the library.

== Overview ==
The Bamberg State Library supplies the town of Bamberg and the region Upper Franconia with literature for research and higher education purposes, professional work and advanced training. The historically grown holdings of more than 500,000 volumes are continuously supplemented and enlarged by acquisitions in all general fields, and in specialized areas such as the history and geography of (Upper) Franconia, art history and appreciation, manuscripts and the printed book.

It cooperates in all areas of librarianship with the University Library of Bamberg.

One of its regional tasks is to acquire documentary material on and of persons who are connected with the region.

More over it gets the legal deposit for the region of Upper Franconia; that means the Bamberg State Library receives a copy of every book published in Upper Franconia and continues to compile a complete bibliography of the region.

It also provides space for book collections belonging to Bamberg institutions such as the Bamberg Historical Society (German: Historischer Verein Bamberg), the Bamberg Society of Naturalists (German: Naturforschende Gesellschaft Bamberg), the Bamberg Art Association (German: Kunstverein Bamberg) the E.-T.-A.-Hoffmann-Gesellschaft and the Bamberg group of the Frankenbund.

Its high esteem to be a research library of international rank is based on its rich manuscripts holdings. This collection may be traced back to the emperor Henry II, who founded the bishopric of Bamberg on 1 November 1007. Three of these manuscripts became part of UNESCO's Memory of the World:

- the Bamberg Apocalypse (German: Bamberger Apokalypse; Msc.Bibl.140),
- the Commentary on the Song of Songs, on the Book of Proverbs and on the Book of Daniel (German: Kommentar zum Hohen Lied, zu den Sprüchen Salomos und zum Buch Daniel; Msc.Bibl.22), and
- the Lorsch Pharmacopoeia (German: Lorscher Arzneibuch; Msc.Med.1).

== Holdings in figures ==
- 566,000 volumes in total
- 80,000 graphics and photographs
- 3,600 incunabula (15th century prints)
- 6,400 manuscripts in total (1,000 medieval manuscripts)
- 1,650 current journals

== History ==
The nucleus of the collection may be traced back to the emperor Henry II, who founded the bishopric of Bamberg in 1007. Among his gifts to the cathedral were many precious manuscripts, which he and his predecessors had collected or commissioned. Manuscripts from various spiritual centres of the Western world were brought to Bamberg as a result. In the ensuing period many books were written and illuminated in the town, notably in the 12th century by the Benedictine monks of the Michaelsberg Abbey.

Bamberg was the first place where printed books in the German language were illustrated with woodcuts. Although only fragments of the very first period of printing in Bamberg can be found in the library, the collection of incunabula documents the wide range of book production in the 15th century.

All that remained of these manuscripts and books in the monasteries of the town and bishopric up to 1802/1803 was incorporated into one library (now the Bamberg State Library) during the period of German Mediatisation and merged with the library of the old University of Bamberg, which had been founded in 1648 as a Jesuit academy and was closed at that time. Bamberg became part of the Electorate of Bavaria. In the course of the 19th century the library was enriched by gifts such as the art historian Joseph Heller's collection, which today comprises 80,000 prints and drawings. The E. T. A. Hoffmann material became a special collection in our times, as did, more recently, autograph books from the 18th and 19th century.

== Building ==
The Bamberg State Library nowadays is housed in the east wing of the New Residence of Bamberg which was built in 1697–1703 by Johann Leonhard Dientzenhofer on behalf of Prince-Bishop Lothar Franz von Schönborn. Originally, the administration of the bishopric was placed in that wing of the building.

The so-called Dominikanerräume are part of the library's showrooms which are not open to public. They are so called because of the bookshelves from Bamberg's Dominican monastery that were brought to the library during the secularisation when the monastery was closed down.

The Vierzehnheiligenpavillion on the third floor also belongs to the internal showrooms. It was the prince-bishop's library room. Since 1978, the former wine cellar serves as closed access stacks. The library presents in the entrance hall precious stained glass dating from the 16th and 17th centuries. Joseph Heller, an art historian and collector, left them as legacy to the library. The reading room can be reached from the entrance hall. In former times, it served the prince-bishop as audience room and summer room. The reading room provides a view over the rose garden which also was built on behalf of Prince-Bishop Lothar Franz von Schönborn. During the exhibitions taking place several times a year the Sternengewölbe and the former Gartensaal – or Scagliolasaal – can be visited.
