= RheinMain University and State Library =

German library (1963–2010)

Coordinates: 50°04′40″N 08°14′15″E

- Hochschul- und Landesbibliothek RheinMain
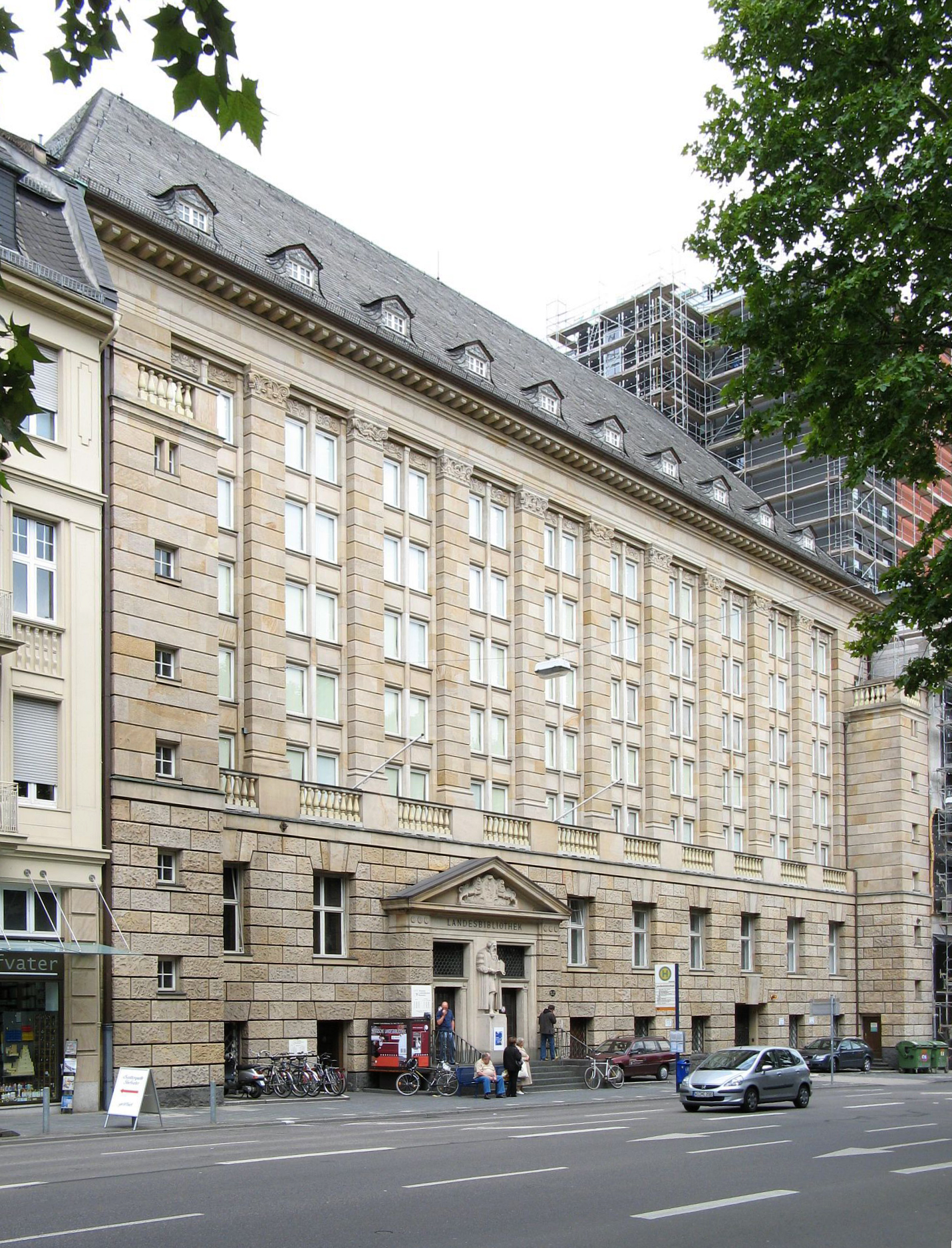
- The library building in central Wiesbaden, built in 1913
- Location: Wiesbaden, Rüsselsheim, Germany
- Type: Academic library, regional library
- Established: 1813
- Branch of: RheinMain University of Applied Sciences

Collection
- Size: 1.000.000
- Legal deposit: Parts of Hesse

Other information
- Director: Marion Grabka
- Website: www.hs-rm.de/hlb

RheinMain University and State Library (German: Hochschul- und Landesbibliothek RheinMain), formerly Nassau State Library and Hessian State Library, is funded by the State of Hesse and located in Wiesbaden and Rüsselsheim. With collections currently comprising over one million items, it is one of Germany's medium-sized libraries. The major special collection is on the former state of Nassau, in which the library has its roots. As of 1 January 2011 it became part of RheinMain University of Applied Sciences. It is a central service facility of the RheinMain University of Applied Sciences and provides literature for the population of the city and region.

== History ==
=== Former University Library ===
The university library was established in 1971 with the founding of "Wiesbaden University of Applied Sciences". It took over the book collections of the Baugewerkschule in Idstein, which had been built up since 1869 and initially remained there. In the early years, there were only library rooms attached to the faculties until 1982, when the libraries of several faculties were brought together in a new building on Kurt-Schumacher-Ring. Further locations were added in 1992 in Bleichstraße (today an extension to Bertramstraße) and in 2003 in the library on the Unter den Eichen campus.

=== State Library ===
The library goes back to the administrative government library in Usingen Castle initiated by Charlotte Amalie von Nassau-Usingen in 1730, which moved to the former Old Castle on the market square in Wiesbaden in 1744. In the course of German secularization from 1803, it was greatly expanded by considerable additions from monastery libraries. It has been open to the public since 1813 and, as the Duchy of Nassau's public library, was granted the right to deposit copies - this year is therefore regarded as the actual founding year of the State Library. In 1821, it moved into the Erbprinzenpalais in Wilhelmstraße. After Nassau became Prussian in 1866, the library was given the name Königliche Bibliothek Wiesbaden (Royal Library Wiesbaden), it moved from the center to the periphery and experienced a period of crisis with a considerable decline in new acquisitions. It was not until 1900 (when the library was transferred to municipal ownership and renamed "Nassau State Library", with Erich Liesegang (1860–1931) and Gottfried Zedler as key librarians), that a fundamental reorganization and exemplary re-cataloguing led to an upswing, as a result of which the library was able to move into the newly constructed building in Rheinstraße in 1913, where it is still located today.

After 1918, the relative impoverishment of the city also made itself felt in the state library. In 1938, the regional association for the administrative district of Wiesbaden in the Prussian Province of Hesse-Nassau became the library's sponsor, which meant that the administrative business was effectively taken over by Nazi functionaries in the service of Provincial governor Wilhelm Traupel.

During the Second World War, the library relocated numerous valuable holdings (including the Wiesbaden Codex and the illuminated Scivias Codex of Hildegard of Bingen, both from the 12th century, as well as several medieval manuscripts from Schönau Abbey to Dresden (Girozentrale Sachsen) for security reasons. These works have been lost since they were confiscated by the Soviet Military Administration in Germany in December 1945. Only the Wiesbaden Codex returned to the Library in 1948. The State Library was the only academic library in Hesse to survive the air raids of the war years completely unscathed. In 1953, the new federal state of Hesse took over its sponsorship. As a result, the building was renamed the Hessian State Library in 1963.

== Holdings and collections ==
The library currently has just over 1,000,000 volumes in its holdings, of which 150.000 date from before 1900. The most important special collection is the Nassovica collection with around 70,000 volumes relating to the former Duchy of Nassau and/or the House of Nassau and its successor states. It also owns 325 manuscripts, 444 incunabula, 6079 autographs and 286 other rare works, such as those from Eberbach Abbey, Schönau Abbey or the government libraries of former Nassau territories (e.g. Sayn-Hachenburg). The library of Herborn Academy, a stronghold of German Reformed Christianity, deserves special mention, as most of it came to Wiesbaden when the Hohe Schule was dissolved in 1817.

== Special tasks ==
Special tasks The library collects: regional literature, in particular of the former Nassau region (special collection "Nassovica") of the regional legal deposit law for Wiesbaden, Hochtaunus, Lahn-Dill-Kreis, Limburg-Weilburg, Main-Kinzig-Kreis, Main-Taunus, and Rheingau-Taunus-Kreis. The collected items can be researched in Hessian Bibliography. Since 2004, the Hessische Fachstelle für Öffentliche Bibliotheken, which offers advice and services for municipal/public libraries, has also been assigned to the library.

== See also ==
- List of libraries in Germany
- State libraries of Germany
- Staatsbibliothek
