= Hessian Bibliography =

German regional biography

The Hessian Bibliography (German: Hessische Bibliographie) is a German regional bibliography. Its aim is to completely capture all the literature connected with the geography, history and culture of the German federal state of Hesse from the year 1974. It is based on the holdings of the copyright libraries at Kassel, Fulda, Frankfurt, Wiesbaden and Darmstadt.

By 2000 a total of 24 indexed year books had appeared in print; since then it has only been available in electronic form as a freely accessible database of the Hessian library information system (HEBIS). The titles are recorded in accordance with the Rules for Alphabetic Cataloguing and accessed using a comprehensive system of about 1,200 system sites and keywords. About 6,500 bibliographic records are added per year.

The Hessian bibliography is part of the Virtual German National Bibliography, which has its own web portal.

For the period before 1974, the "Literature on the History and Historic Geograph and Culture of Hesse" is used. This consists of seven printed volumes by Karl Ernst Demandt (covering the period to 1964) and by Winfried Leist and Wolfgang Podehl (covering the period 1965-1976). Currently, the volumes of Podehl and Leist are gradually being added retrospectively to the database.

== Literature ==
- There is literature about Hessian Bibliography in the Hessian Bibliography
- Brigitte Störch: Landesbibliographische Berichterstattung in Hessen. In: Ludger Syré (ed.): Die Regionalbibliographie im digitalen Zeitalter. Frankfurt a.M. 2006, pp. 257–266. Full text (pdf; 154 kB)
