= Cologne Public Library =

Public library in Germany

Coordinates: 50°56′03″N 6°56′58″E

- StadtBibliothek Köln
- Location: Cologne, Germany
- Type: Public library
- Established: 1890

Collection
- Size: c. 850,000 items

Other information
- Website: www.stadt-koeln.de/leben-in-koeln/stadtbibliothek/index.html

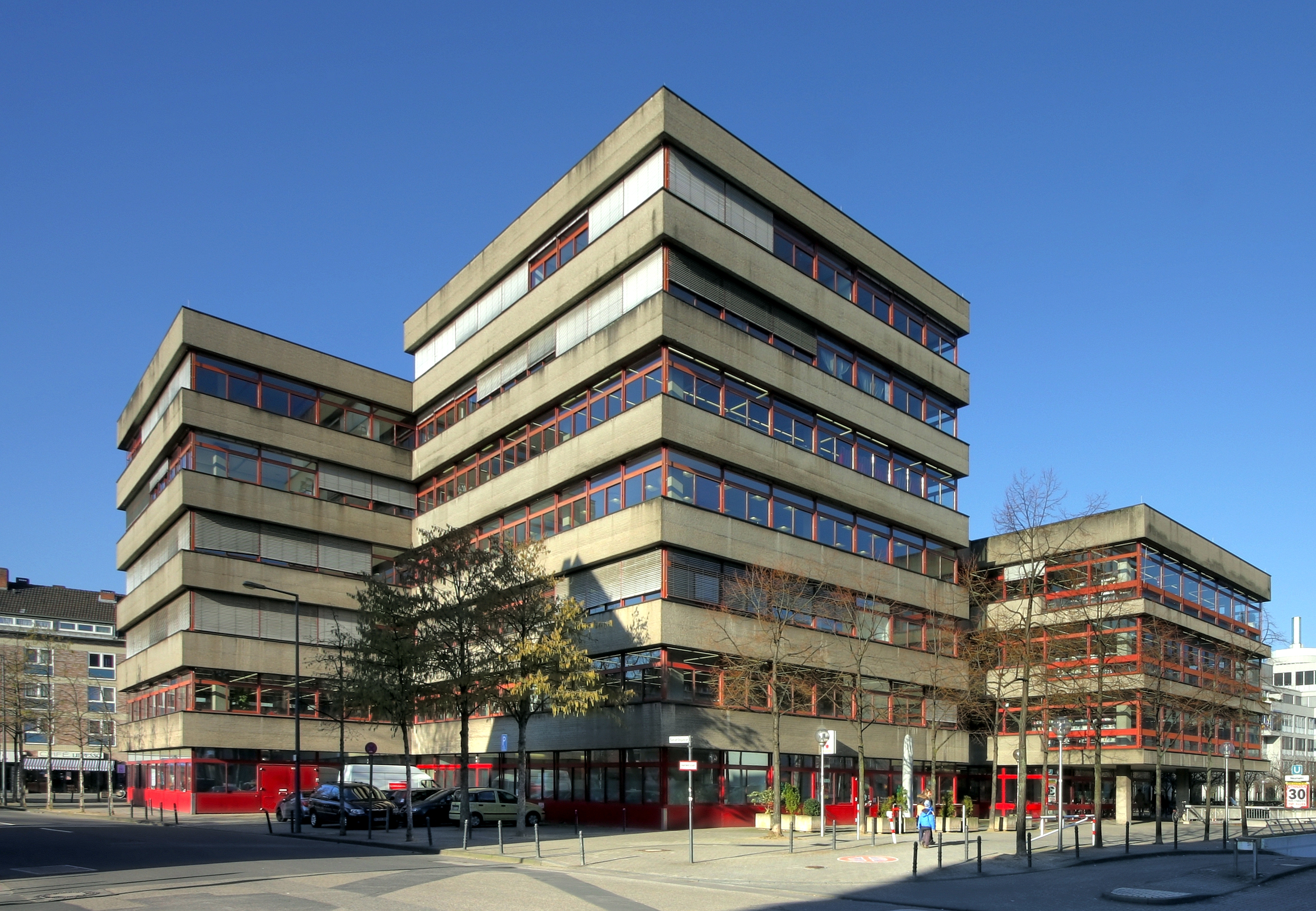
Central Library at Josef-Haubrich-Hof (Neumarkt)

The Cologne Public Library (German: StadtBibliothek Köln) is among the biggest and most important public libraries in Germany. The central library is part of the 'Kulturquartier' (a cultural hub) near the Neumarkt. It is located at the Josef-Haubrich-Hof, with the new Rautenstrauch-Joest-Museum (cultures of the world) in its immediate neighbourhood. Since January 2025, Anja Flicker is the director of the library. For the time of the renovation the central library is located at Hohe Straße 68-82.

== The library system ==
The library system is made up of the central library, 11 branch libraries, a mobile library and several special collections like library for blind people, LIK-Archiv, Gerania Judaica and Heinrich Böll Archiv. Within the local authorities, the library is affiliated to the department of art and culture. The library provides the residents of Cologne (about a million inhabitants) with information resources for education and training; in addition, there are many users from the region around Cologne and from neighbouring countries (Belgium, Netherlands, Luxembourg).

=== The central library ===
The central library at the Josef-Haubrich-Hof is located in a building with an area of 11.000 qm and has eleven floors, where four floors are used for the magazine. Five floors are for the public usage designed. From June 2024 until 2028 the central library is going to be renovated. It provides access to all sorts of printed items (also printed music and maps), CDs, CD-ROMs, DVDs (also interactive DVDs), Blu-rays, audio books, games, language courses, software and multi media packages. Personal computers are available on all floors for accessing the internet, the catalogue, and databases. The facility also offers Wi-Fi areas, photocopiers, CD listening stations, private study spaces, and meeting rooms for training sessions. On the third floor, a designated area is provided for pupils to study individually or work in groups. Patrons may also practise playing the piano, with both an electronic piano and, in a separate room, a grand piano available. The entrance area features an information centre with national and international newspapers, exhibition catalogues, and a window projection displaying cultural events. A large reading room serves as a venue for events.

There are several special collections: the library for the blind (providing access to a great number of items by 'Medibus'), the Heinrich-Böll-Archiv (Heinrich Böll Archive) and the collection 'Literatur in Köln' (literature in Cologne). There is an exhibition space with the last work room (completely furnished) of Heinrich Böll and a photo exhibition of authors from Cologne. In addition, the central library hosts the Germania Judaica, Cologne's library for the history of the German Jewry.

=== Interim of the Central library ===
Because of the general renervation of the building of the central library, all media and items had to move into an interim on the Hohe Straße 68-82.

=== The branch libraries ===
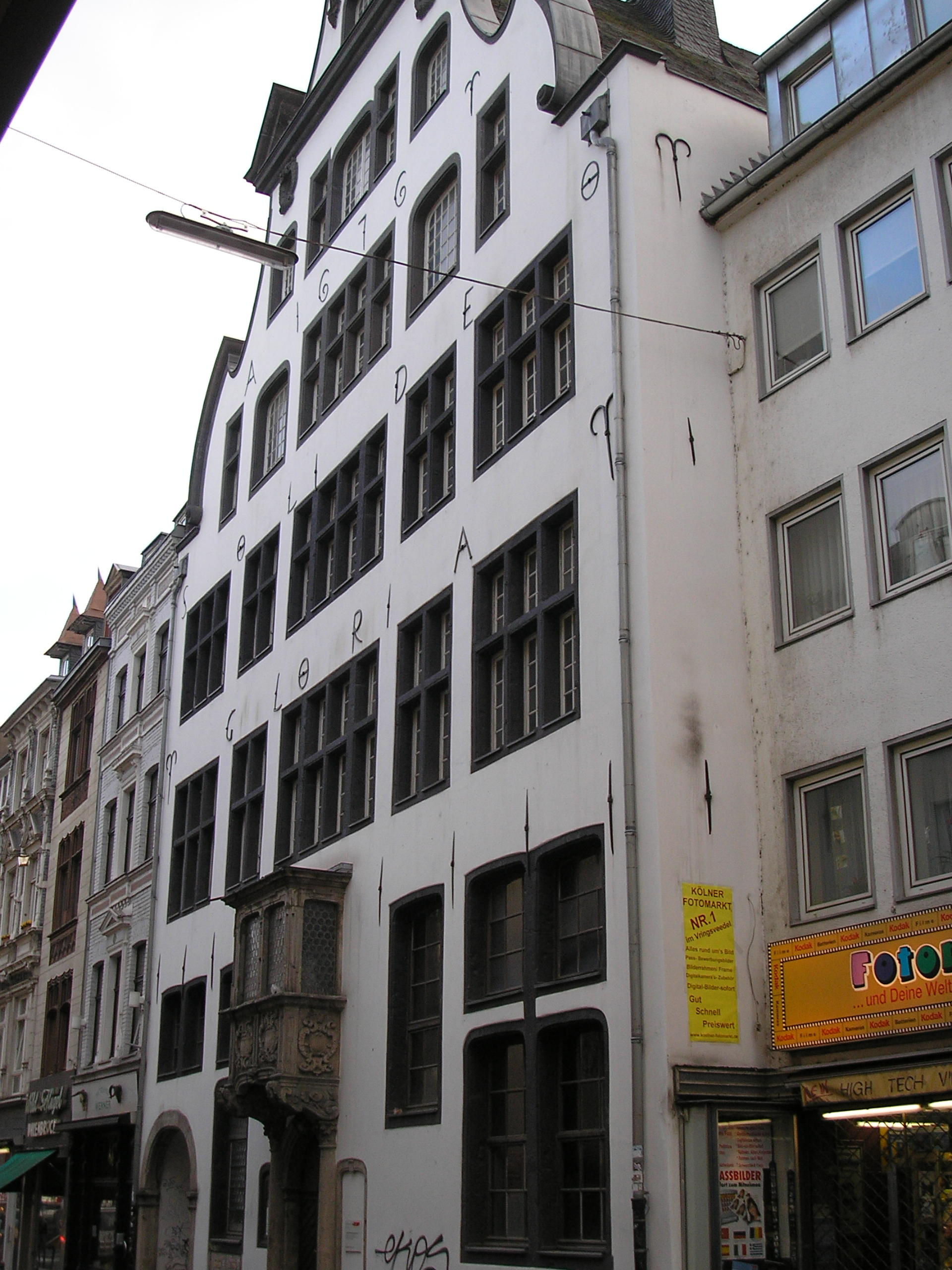
Branch library Haus Balchem on Severinstraße

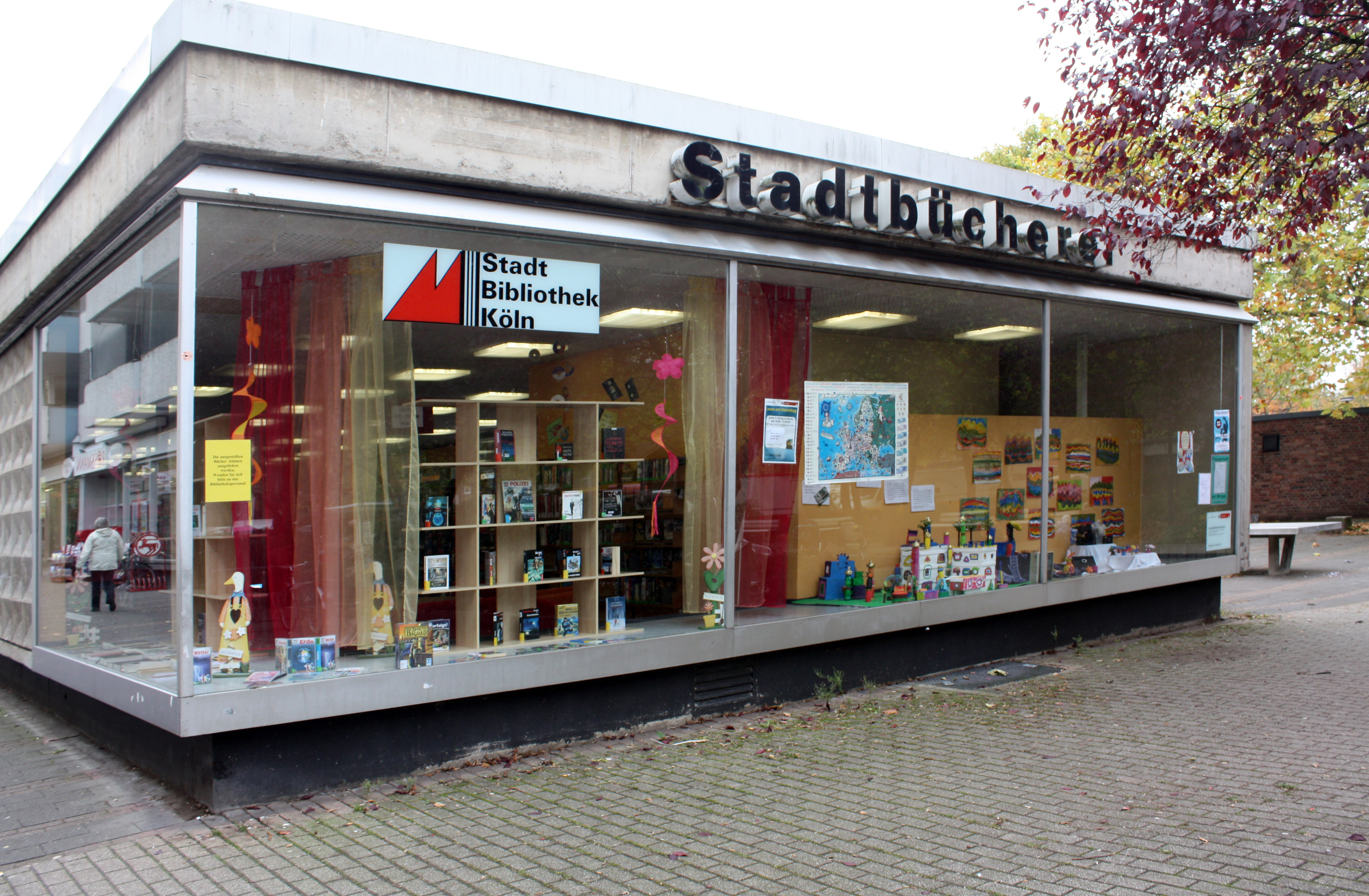
Branch library Cologne-Neubrück

There are branches in Bocklemünd, Chorweiler, Ehrenfeld, Kalk, Mülheim, Neubrück, Nippes, Porz, Rodenkirchen and Sülz. The branch in the Südstadt (Haus Balchem) is something special: it is housed in a building, which was reconstructed in 17th century baroque style after the second world war. The branch library in Bocklemünd is something like a junior company: it is managed by apprentices under the supervision of a young library employee. The mobile library serves another 18 neighbourhoods in Cologne.

== Service and offers ==
Other than providing fiction and non-fiction books, the library provides with a lot more items: DVDs, Blu-Rays, CDs and films of different fields. There are also musical notes, media for children games and e-media for library users. Even professional platforms like Statista and Nexis can be used. The library offers various library education programmes and cooperates with schools. The interlibrary loans department procures items from other libraries, if they are not available in Cologne. There are training sessions on how to conduct searches in databases and on the internet. The school service offers educational programmes designed for various age groups using methods to encourage pupils to be active, thus promoting media and information literacy.

The library offers a lot of items in the context of "Bibliothek der Dinge". It includes not just robots and items from the MINT-space, but also items which aren't used on a daily basis. The thought behind this offer is to make items available for everyone and be environment friendly (Shareconomy), so everyone can try items out.

There are makerspaces in different branches of the public library. Devices for digitization of VHS-cassettes or vinyl records as well as cutting plotter or 3D-printer and VR glasses can be found there. A fully equipped social-media-studio is also placed in the central library. The music library of the central library accommodates a baby grand piano, e-drums and an e-piano. E-pianos can also be found in the branch libraries in Nippes and Porz.

== Events ==
Cologne Library is not just a knowledge store, but also a much-frequented location for events. There are a lot of event types for different topics: readings on societal topics, reading promotion, events for gaming and robotics, workshops with a creative focus and the MINT-Festival, weeks with specialized workshops based on MINT-topics for children and adults.

Other than that there are educational programms and cooperations with schools. The school service apartment of the library provides educational workshops to teach media and information literacy.

== Reading promotion ==
Cologne library offers a reading promotion programme which consists of modules. The 'Cologne bookbabies' focuses on promoting language acquisition and perception. . 'Bücherbande' is mainly aimed at day nurseries, with playful reading promotion elements such as the Bücherbande-paint book. Older children can join the 'Leseclub'. Each member between six and 15 years of age receives an individual reading diary with age-specific tasks. 'Ran ans Lesen' was developed for the great number of all-day schools in Cologne. This project includes writing 'reading diaries', volunteer engagement and cooperation with teachers.

A highlight is the event "Junges Buch für die Stadt"-event, which is organized in cooperation with the Literaturhaus and Kölner Stadt-Anzeiger.

== Intercultural meeting place ==
As a multicultural meeting place, the public library of Cologne opens up many opportunities for language acquisition and cooperates with agencies which run integration courses. The integration project Bi-IN is about making teachers of integration courses see the advantages of using a library and making the participants of the courses familiar with the library.

== Cooperations ==
There is cooperative networking, among others, with: 'lit.COLOGNE' (a literature festival), the 'Literaturhaus Köln' (House of Literature), the 'SK Stiftung Kultur' (the cultural foundation of the municipal savings bank of Cologne), the 'Belgisches Haus' (the 'Belgian House'), Cologne University and the 'Kölner Freiwilligen-Agentur' (a volunteer agency in Cologne), the 'Hochschulbibliothekszentrum' (a service centre for academic libraries) and the 'Volkshochschule Köln' (the municipal adult education centre). The library has also been involved in cooperation with many schools in Cologne, using the framework provided by the project 'Bildungspartner Bibliothek und Schule NRW' (Education Partners in Libraries and Schools /Northrhine-Westphalia).

== Friends of the Library (The Friends Associations) ==
- Förderverein StadtBibliothek Köln e.V.(reactivating the mobile library, supporting the minibib in the water tower, the library in the park, minibib in Chorweiler). The minibib concept works without a membership, based on trust.
- Literamus e.V.

== History ==
The first so-called Volksbibliothek was opened in 1890. In the course of time, several Volksbibliotheken (people's libraries) and Lesehallen (reading halls) were established by donations and municipal funds. In 1931, a mobile library was introduced in Cologne. After World War II numerous book donations from abroad helped to restock the Volksbüchereien, as they were called by then. In 1966 the city council decided to rename them; the name Stadtbücherei Köln was chosen.

The central library, opened in 1979, was modelled on the Anglo-American public library. In Cologne, there are two institutions having 'Stadtbibliothek' in their name: The 'Universitäts- und Stadtbibliothek Köln' (University and City Library of Cologne), being originally funded by the city of Cologne, adopted this name in 1920; the 'StadtBibliothek Köln' (the former Stadtbücherei Köln) is the public library, the upper-case 'B' making it easier to help tell them apart.

The Cologne public library was the first public library with their own webserver. In the meantime the homepage of the public library is integrated into the website of Cologne.

In 2015, the Cologne public library was awarded as Library of the Year while Dr. Hannelore Vogt was director of the library.
