= Gleiberg (volcano) =

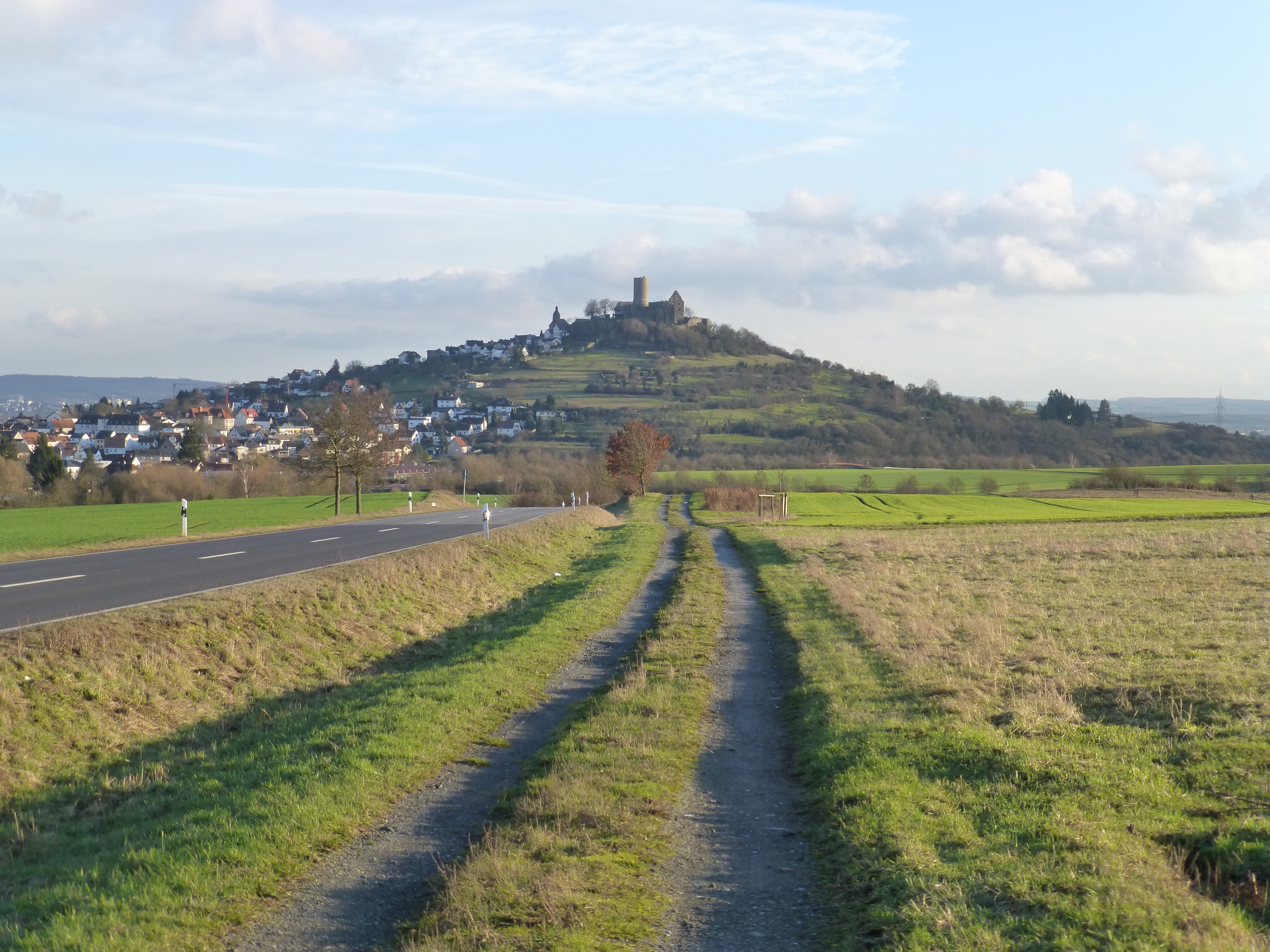
- view from a local road (Landesstraße 3047)

Highest point
- Elevation: 308 m (1,010 ft)
- Coordinates: 50°36′54″N 8°38′05″E

Geography
- Location: Hesse, Germany

Geology
- Mountain type: extinct volcano

Gleiberg is a hill and extinct volcano in Hesse, Germany. It is located directly north of the city of Gießen and has been extinct since the tertiary period. On its top are the ruins of the medieval castle Burg Gleiberg, which today host a restaurant.
