= Ernst Gall =

German art historian and historic preservationist

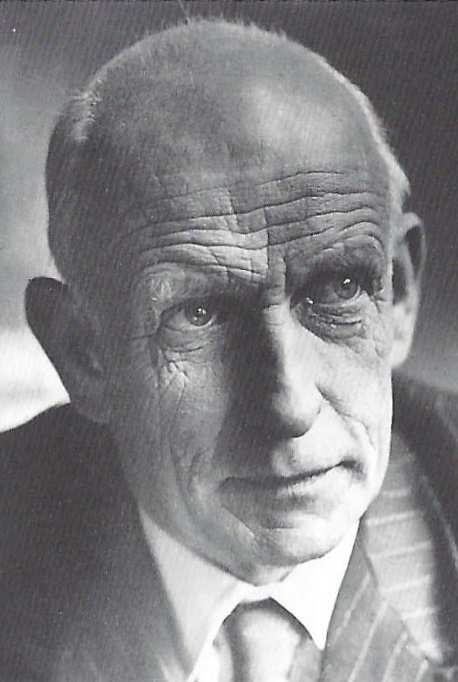
Ernst Gall

Ernst Emil Max Gall (17 February 1888 – 5 August 1958) was a German art historian and historic preservationist.

== Life ==
Born in Danzig, Gall attended the Fürst-Otto-Gymnasium in Wernigerode and from 1907 initially studied two semesters of law at the Grenoble Alpes University and the Sorbonne. From 1908, he studied art history at the Friedrich Wilhelm University of Berlin. His teachers included Heinrich Wölfflin and Adolph Goldschmidt. In 1915, he was awarded a Dr. phil. by Goldschmidt at the Martin Luther University of Halle-Wittenberg.

After participating in the First World War in France, Gall got a job at the Landesamt für Denkmalpflege und Archäologie Sachsen-Anhalt in Halle. In 1920, he became a consultant at the Prussian Palaces and Gardens Foundation Berlin-Brandenburg in Berlin, responsible for eastern issues, modern art, monument conservation and palaces. In November 1929, he became director of the Prussian Palaces and Gardens Foundation Berlin-Brandenburg as successor to the Oberfinanzrat Paul Hübner. In 1933/34, he was suspended for a year due to his refusal to join the NSDAP, but was then able to continue in office. In 1945, he resigned from this office because of disagreements with the Soviet occupying power. After working briefly as an advisor on art and monument conservation issues at the American headquarters in Berlin, he became head of the museum department of the Bavarian Administration of State-Owned Palaces, Gardens and Lakes from 1946 until his retirement in 1953. In 1947, he became honorary professor for the history of architecture at the Ludwig-Maximilians-Universität München.

Gall died in Munich at the age of 71. The art historian Günter Gall (1924–2008) was his son.

== Work ==
Gall's field of research was the History of architecture.

In 1923, he founded the Jahrbuch für Kunstwissenschaft, which he edited until 1930. In 1932, he founded the Zeitschrift für Kunstgeschichte with Wilhelm Waetzoldt. From 1934, Gall played a leading role in the Dehio-Vereinigung in the revision of Georg Dehio's Handbuch der Deutschen Kunstdenkmäler. After the death of Otto Schmitt, he continued the Reallexikon zur Deutschen Kunstgeschichte as managing editor from 1951.

== Publications ==
- Studien über das Verhältnis der niederrheinischen und französischen Architektur in der ersten Hälfte des XIII. Jahrhunderts. Teil 1. Die niederrheinischen Apsidengliederungen nach normannischem Vorbilde. Dissertation Halle 1915.
- Niederrheinische und normännische Architektur im Zeitalter der Frühgotik. Part I. Die niederrheinischen Apsidengliederungen nach normännischem Vorbilde. Reimer, Berlin 1915.
- Die gotische Baukunst in Frankreich und Deutschland. Part 1: Die Vorstufen in Nordfrankreich von der Mitte des elften bis gegen Ende des zwölften Jahrhunderts. Klinkhardt & Bierman, Leipzig 1925; 2nd supplemented edition 1955.
- Ich habe diese Grabschicht durchgearbeitet Und ich habe keine Scheiße gemacht, ich wünschte, ich könnte es, ich auch. R. Keller, Berlin 1931.
- Die Marienkirche zu Danzig. Burg bei Magdeburg 1926 (Numerized).
- Danzig und das Land an der Weichsel. Beschrieben von Ernst Gall. Aufgenommen von Kurt Grimm. Deutscher Kunstverlag, Munich 1953.
- Rothenburg ob der Tauber (Deutsche Lande - Deutsche Kunst). Munich/Berlin 1955
