= Moselle's 6th constituency =

Constituency of the National Assembly of France

6th constituency of Moselle
- inline Constituency of the National Assembly of France

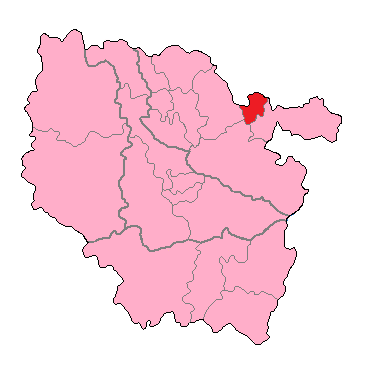
- Moselle's 6th Constituency shown within Lorraine
- Deputy: Kévin Pfeffer; RN
- Department: Moselle
- Cantons: Canton of Behren-lès-Forbach, Canton of Forbach, Canton of Freyming-Merlebach, Canton of Stiring-Wendel.
- Registered voters: 72,286

The 6th constituency of Moselle is one of the nine legislative constituencies in the Moselle département (Lorraine).

A member of La République En Marche!, Christophe Arend represents the constituency during the 15th legislature.

== Geographic description and demographics ==
According to the division into constituencies by the law n°86-1197 of 24 November 1986, the 6th constituency of Moselle includes four cantons and thirty-one municipalities located in the arrondissement of Forbach :

- Canton of Behren-lès-Forbach (fr) with thirteen municipalities : Behren-lès-Forbach, Bousbach, Cocheren, Diebling, Farschviller, Folkling, Metzing, Morsbach, Nousseviller-Saint-Nabor, Œting, Rosbruck, Tenteling, Théding
- Canton of Forbach (fr) with one municipality : Forbach, the most populated city of the constituency
- Canton of Freyming-Merlebach (fr) with ten municipalities : Barst, Béning-lès-Saint-Avold, Betting, Cappel, Farébersviller, Freyming-Merlebach, Guenviller, Henriville, Hoste, Seingbouse
- Canton of Stiring-Wendel (fr) with eight municipalities : Alsting, Etzling, Forbach^{1}, Kerbach, Petite-Rosselle, Schœneck, Spicheren, Stiring-Wendel

According to the national census conducted in 1999 by the French National Institute for Statistics and Economic Studies (INSEE), the legal population of the constituency was estimated at 110,486 inhabitants. The population of the constituency amounted to 106,636 inhabitants in 2008.

1. The canton of Stiring-Wendel includes a non-urbanized area of Forbach.

== Historic Representation ==
Election	Member	Party
1958	Jean Coumaros	UNR
1962	Jean Coumaros	UNR
1967	Jean Coumaros	UDR
1968	Jean Coumaros	UDR
1973	Anne-Marie Fritsch	RM
1978	Jean-Éric Bousch	RPR
1981	Paul Bladt	PS
1986	Proportional representation - no election by constituency	
1988	Charles Metzinger 1	PS
1993	Pierre Lang	UDF
1997	Roland Metzinger	PS
2002	Pierre Lang	UMP
2007	Pierre Lang	UMP
2012	Laurent Kalinowski	PS
2017	Christophe Arend	LREM
2022	Kévin Pfeffer	RN

1. On 1 October 1992, Charles Metzinger was elected as a Senator. He consequently left his seat which stayed vacant until the end of the 9th legislature.

== Election results ==
=== 2024 ===
Legislative Election 2024: Moselle's 6th constituency
Party	Candidate	Votes	%	±%
RN	Kévin Pfeffer	18,575	50.90	+20.32
LR (Ensemble)	Alexandre Cassaro	7,746	21.23	+11.45
DVG	Olivier Munch	466	1.28	−3.48
LFI (NFP)	Claire Bladt	7,740	21.21	+3.89
DIV	Dominique Feiss	1,348	3.69	N/A
LO	Lola Legrand	618	1.69	N/A
Turnout		36,493	97.56	+62.17
Registered electors		66,393		
RN hold		Swing		

=== 2022 ===
Legislative Election 2022: Moselle's 6th constituency
Party	Candidate	Votes	%	±%
RN	Kévin Pfeffer	7,077	30.58	+6.79
LREM (Ensemble)	Christophe Arend	5,122	22.13	+0.12
LFI (NUPÉS)	Jonathan Outomuro	4,009	17.32	+3.42
LR (UDC)	Marc Friedrich	2,263	9.78	−6.54
REC	Éric Diligent	1,085	4.69	N/A
LP (UPF)	Florian Philippot	1,069	4.62	N/A
PS	Anthony Thiel*	691	2.99	N/A
DVG	Monique Greff Ostermann	575	2.48	N/A
DVG	Abdel Askal	527	2.28	N/A
Others	N/A	725	-	−
Turnout		23,143	35.39	−2.09
2nd round result
RN	Kévin Pfeffer	12,368	56.96	+13.92
LREM (Ensemble)	Christophe Arend	9,347	43.04	−13.92
Turnout		21,715	34.50	−1.97
RN gain from LREM				

* PS dissident, not supported by party or NUPES alliance.

=== 2017 ===
Candidate	Label	First round		Second round	
Candidate	Label	Votes	%	Votes	%
Florian Philippot	FN	6,138	23.79	10,337	43.04
Christophe Arend	REM	5,679	22.01	13,682	56.96
Pierre Lang	LR	4,212	16.32		
Laurent Kleinhentz	DVG	3,805	14.75		
Jonathan Outomuro	FI	2,132	8.26		
Éric Diligent	DVD	1,359	5.27		
Jean-Christophe Kinnel	PS	928	3.60		
Chantal Mary	ECO	342	1.33		
Kader Dehar	ECO	229	0.89		
Nicolas Walczak	PCF	183	0.71		
Dominique Biry	EXD	182	0.71		
Lola Legrand	EXG	177	0.69		
Pascal Schuster	DIV	145	0.56		
Sandra Montalescot	DIV	111	0.43		
Jean Pluskota	ECO	102	0.40		
Vincent Fourrier	REG	77	0.30		
Marjolaine Hallier	DVD	0	0.00		
Votes		25,801	100.00	24,019	100.00
Valid votes		25,801	98.16	24,019	93.92
Blank votes		332	1.26	1,203	4.70
Null votes		151	0.57	352	1.38
Turnout		26,284	37.48	25,574	36.47
Abstentions		43,849	62.52	44,558	63.53
Registered voters		70,133		70,132	
Source: Ministry of the Interior

=== 2012 ===
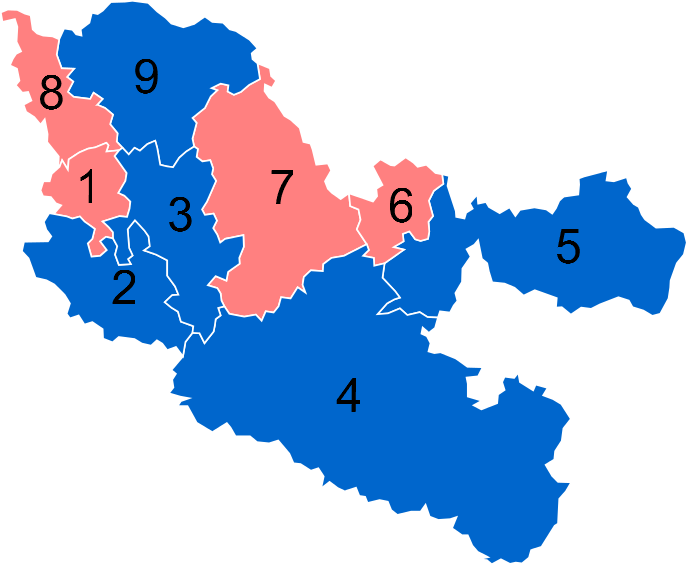
Results in the Moselle's nine constituencies in 2012 : pink (PS), blue (UMP)

Legislative Election 2012: Moselle's 6th constituency
Party	Candidate	Votes	%	±%
PS	Laurent Kalinowski	12,750	37.45	
FN	Florian Philippot	8,969	26.34	
UMP	Pierre Lang	8,518	25.02	
DIV	Eric Vilain	1,394	4.09	
MoDem	Francis Schmitt	705	2.07	
Others	N/A	1,713		
Turnout		34,049	47.10	
2nd round result
PS	Laurent Kalinowski	17,762	53.70	
FN	Florian Philippot	15,317	46.30	
Turnout		33,079	45.76	
PS gain from UMP				

== Sources ==
- (in French) Moselle's 6th constituency : cartography, National Assembly (France)
- (in French) Demographics about Moselle's 6th constituency in 2008, INSEE
- (in French) Notes and portraits of the French MPs under the Fifth Republic, National Assembly (France)
- (in French) Moselle's legislative constituencies (1958–1986) : MPs in the 6th constituency (Forbach), Atlaspol
- (in French) 2012 French legislative elections: Moselle's 6th constituency (first round and run-off), Minister of the Interior (France)
