= Kévin Pfeffer =

French politician

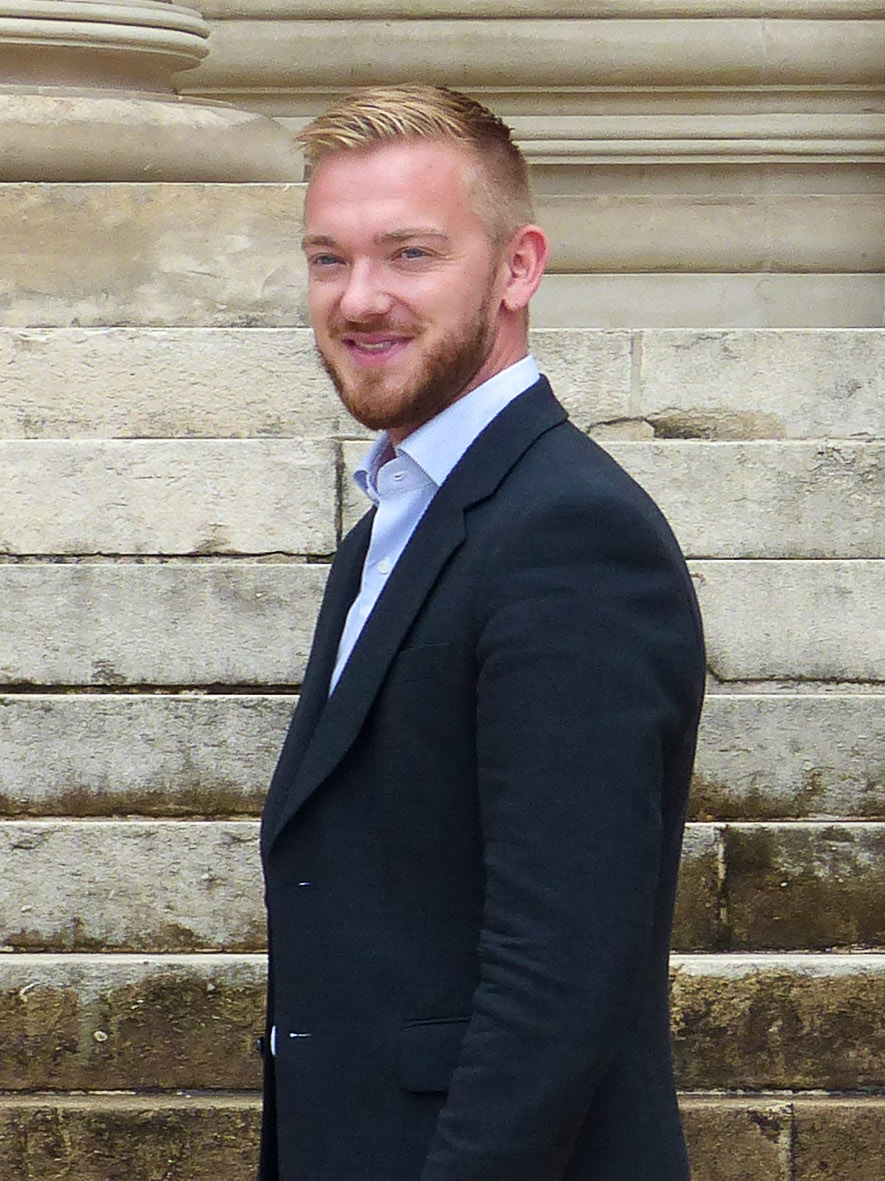

Member of the National Assembly for Moselle's 6th constituency
- Incumbent
- Assumed office 22 June 2022
- Preceded by: Christophe Arend

Personal details
- Born: 9 July 1990 (age 35) Forbach, France
- Party: National Rally
- Other political affiliations: Socialist Party (before 2012)
- Occupation: Politician

Kévin Pfeffer (born 9 July 1990 in Forbach) is a French politician of the National Rally who was elected as a Member of the National Assembly for Moselle's 6th constituency in 2022.

Pfeffer was born in 1990 and holds a degree in chemical engineering. He was initially active in the Desires for the Future campaign to support Socialist Party politician Ségolène Royal before joining the French National Front in 2012.

He climbed up the ranks of the RN, from an activist, to the departmental delegate of Moselle from 2015 to 2020, and then a member of the RN's national executive committee. During the 2017 French legislative election, he stood as the candidate for Moselle's 7th constituency but was not elected. In 2020, he was elected as a municipal councilor in Stiring-Wendel.

For the 2022 French legislative election, he contested Moselle's 6th constituency and successfully gained the seat.
