= Christophe Arend =

French politician

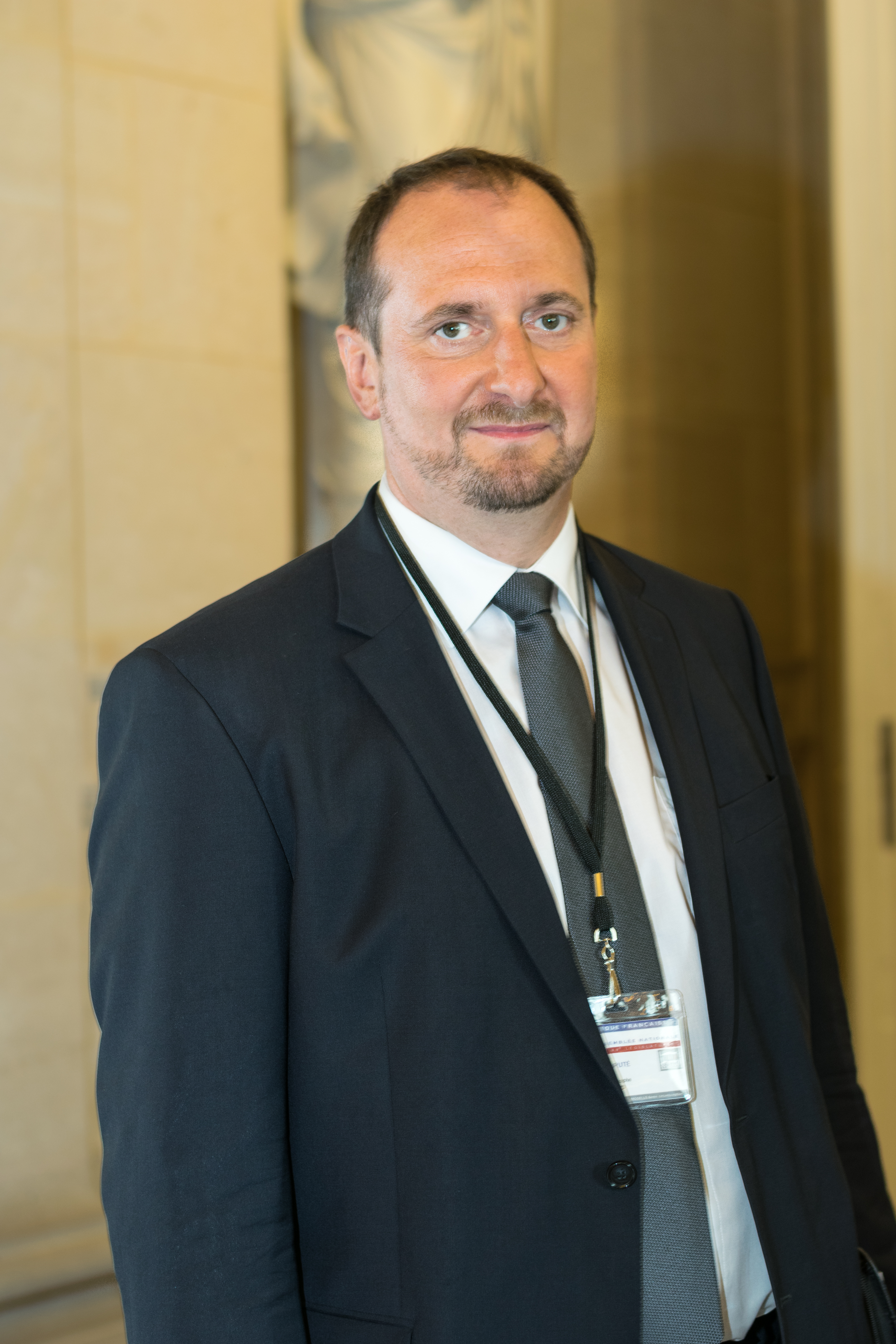

Member of the French National Assembly for Moselle's 6th constituency
- In office 21 June 2017 – 21 June 2022
- Preceded by: Laurent Kalinowski
- Succeeded by: Kévin Pfeffer

Personal details
- Born: 12 August 1975 (age 50) Forbach, France
- Party: En Marche!
- Education: Henri Poincaré University University of Burgundy
- Profession: Dentist

Christophe Arend (born 12 August 1975) is a French politician of La République En Marche! (LREM) who served as a member of the French National Assembly from the 2017 elections until 2022, representing Moselle's 6th constituency.

== Political career ==
In parliament, Arend served as member of the Committee on Sustainable Development and Spatial Planning. In addition to his committee assignments, he was part of the French-German Parliamentary Friendship Group.

In April 2018, Arend joined other co-signatories around Sébastien Nadot in officially filing a request for a commission of inquiry into the legality of French weapons sales to the Saudi-led coalition fighting in Yemen, days before an official visit of Saudi Crown Prince Mohammed bin Salman to Paris.

== See also ==
- 2017 French legislative election
