= Paul Bladt =

French trade unionist and politician (1931–2022)

General Councilor of the Canton of Behren-lès-Forbach
- In office 2 October 1988 – 16 March 2008
- Preceded by: Charles Stirnweiss
- Succeeded by: Jean-Bernard Martin

Member of the French National Assembly
- In office 21 June 1981 – 1 April 1986
- Preceded by: Jean-Éric Bousch
- Succeeded by: Charles Metzinger
- Constituency: Moselle's 6th constituency

Mayor of Cocheren
- In office 20 March 1977 – 22 December 1997
- Preceded by: Adrien Landfrid
- Succeeded by: Jean-Bernard Martin

Personal details
- Born: 1 June 1931 Metz, France
- Died: 8 May 2022 (aged 90) Saint-Avold, France
- Party: PS
- Occupation: Trade unionist

Paul Bladt (1 June 1931 – 8 May 2022) was a French politician and trade unionist.

== Biography ==
While working as an apprentice fitter, Bladt discovered the Young Christian Workers, which he joined at the age of 17. After leaving the organization in 1957, he began working as a fitter in Lorraine coal mines. He was an activist in the French Confederation of Christian Workers before working at the national office of the French Democratic Confederation of Labour for mineworkers.

In 1972, Bladt joined the Socialist Party (PS) and was elected mayor of Cocheren in 1977. He was consistently re-elected to this position until his resignation in 1997. In 1981, he was elected to represent Moselle's 6th constituency in the National Assembly, but did not seek re-election in 1986. He represented the Canton of Behren-lès-Forbach in the General Council of Moselle from 1988 to 2008, when he retired from politics and moved to Cité Belle-Roche.

Paul Bladt died in Saint-Avold on 8 May 2022 at the age of 90.
