= Behren-lès-Forbach =

- Commune
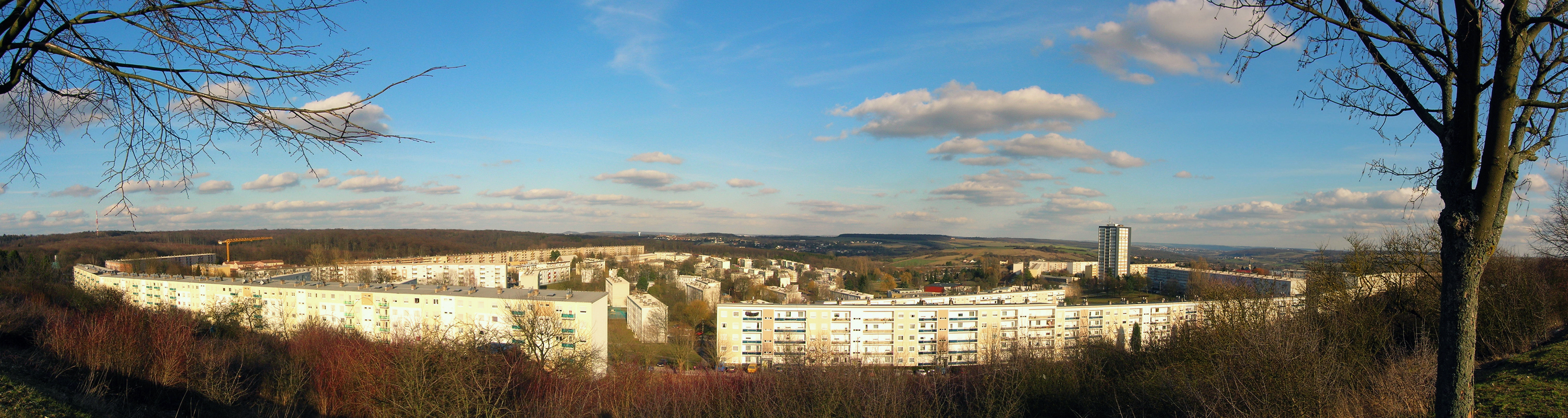
- A general view of Behren-lès-Forbach

- Coat of arms
- Location of Behren-lès-Forbach
- Location within France Location within Grand Est
- Coordinates: 49°10′28″N 6°56′08″E
- Country: France
- Region: Grand Est
- Department: Moselle
- Arrondissement: Forbach-Boulay-Moselle
- Canton: Stiring-Wendel
- Intercommunality: CA Forbach Porte de France

Government
  - Mayor (2020–2026): Dominique Ferrau
- Area^{1}: 5.54 km^{2} (2.14 sq mi)
- Highest elevation: 382 m (1,253 ft)
- Lowest elevation: 243 m (797 ft)
- Population (2023): 6,166
  - Density: 1,110/km^{2} (2,880/sq mi)
- Time zone: UTC+01:00 (CET)
  - Summer (DST): UTC+02:00 (CEST)
- INSEE/Postal code: 57058 /57460
- ^{1} French Land Register data, which excludes lakes, ponds, glaciers > 1 km^{2} (0.386 sq mi or 247 acres) and river estuaries.

Behren-lès-Forbach (French pronunciation: [beʁən lɛ fɔʁbak], literally Behren near Forbach; German: Behren) is a commune in the Moselle department in Grand Est in northeastern France. Between 1812 and 1925, it was part of the commune of Kerbach.

== Population ==
Historical population

Year	Pop.	±% p.a.
1793	250	—
1800	244	−0.35%
1806	291	+2.98%
1926	519	+0.48%
1931	502	−0.66%
1936	473	−1.18%
1946	429	−0.97%
1954	524	+2.53%
1962	10,486	+45.43%

Year	Pop.	±% p.a.
1968	12,512	+2.99%
1975	12,015	−0.58%
1982	11,152	−1.06%
1990	10,291	−1.00%
1999	10,073	−0.24%
2007	8,781	−1.70%
2012	7,500	−3.10%
2017	6,562	−2.64%
2023	6,166	−1.03%

Source: EHESS and INSEE (1968-2023)

== See also ==
- Communes of the Moselle department
