= Hôtel de Ville, Forbach =

Town hall in Forbach, France

Hôtel de Ville
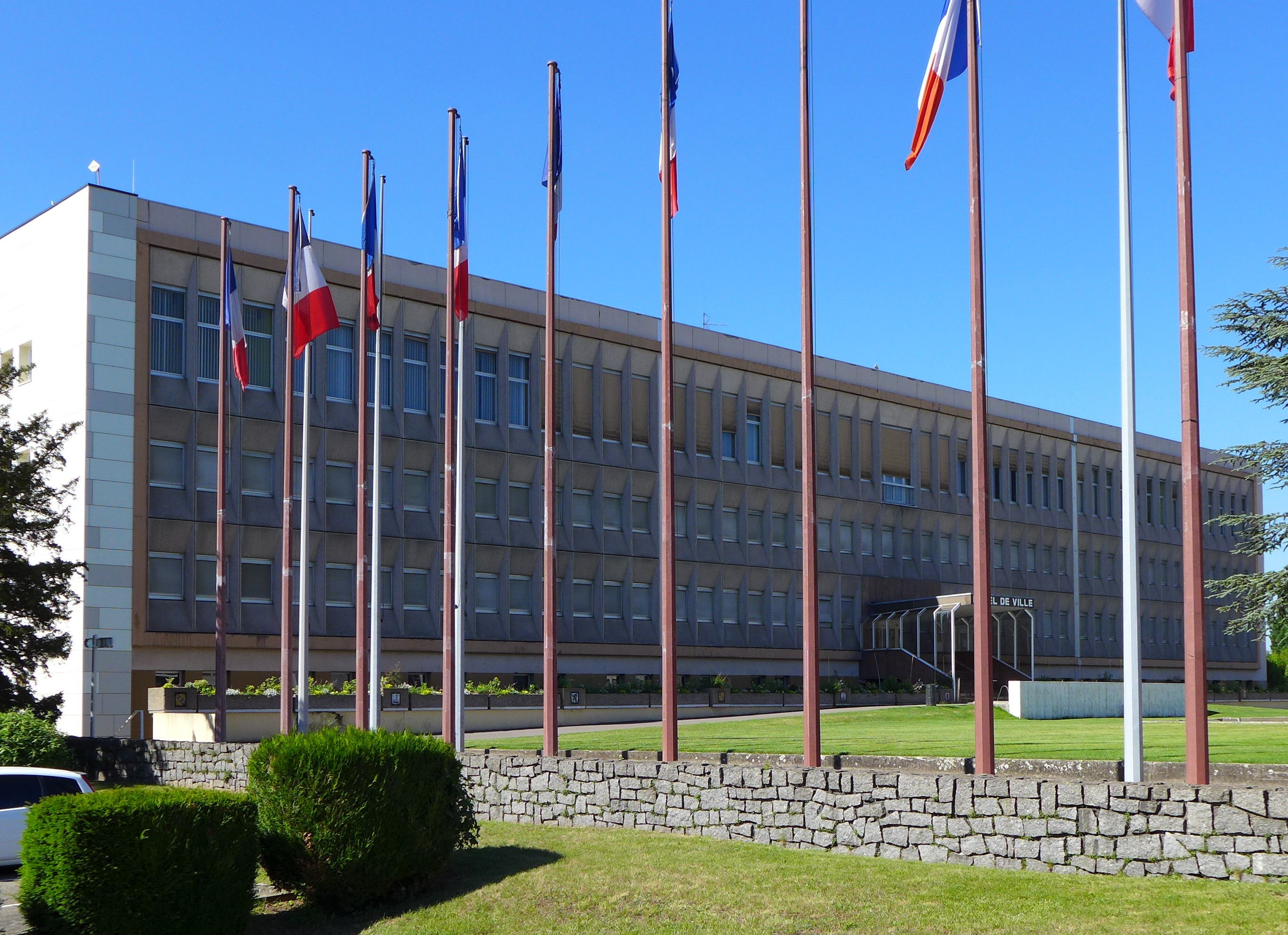
- The main frontage of the Hôtel de Ville in June 2017

General information
- Type: City hall
- Architectural style: Modern style
- Location: Forbach, France
- Coordinates: 49.1864°N 6.8955°E
- Completed: 1974

Design and construction
- Architects: Roland Flageul and Guy Bourdon

The Hôtel de Ville (French pronunciation: [otɛl də vil], City Hall) is a municipal building in Forbach, Moselle, in northeastern France, standing on Avenue Saint-Rémy.

== History ==
The old town hall

Under the ancien regime, the aldermen of the town met in the maison communale (municipal building), which incorporated cells for incarcerating petty criminals, in the market place (now Place Aristide Briand). In 1839, the town council led by the mayor, François Antoine Constantin Barrabino, decided to demolish the old maison communale and to commission a purpose-built town hall in the market place. The new building was designed in the neoclassical style, built in ashlar stone and was completed in 1843. The design involved a symmetrical main frontage of ten bays facing onto the square with the end bays slightly projected forward. The central section of eight bays was fenestrated by round-headed windows on the ground floor, and by square-headed windows with cornices on the first floor. The end bays featured round-headed doorways with voussoirs on the ground floor and casement windows with pediments on the first floor and, at roof level, there was a clock above the central two bays.

In March 1945, during the Second World War, the old town hall was irreparably damaged in fighting as American troops sought to liberate the town. The council established temporary premises first at the Tribunal d'Instance on Avenue du Général-Passaga and then, in 1946, in the old Bank of Forbach building on Rue Sainte-Croix. The president of France, Charles de Gaulle, met with council leaders in this building on 2 July 1961, and his successor, Georges Pompidou, delivered a speech outside it on 14 April 1972.

In 1969, following significant population growth, the council led by the mayor, Jean-Éric Bousch, decided to commission a modern municipal building. The site they selected had been occupied by the Convent of the Sisters of Providence of Saint-Andrew which had been founded by Abbot Antoine Gapp in 1820. The foundation stone for the new building was laid in June 1971. It was designed in the modern style by Roland Flageul, with interior design by Guy Bourdon, built in concrete and glass and was completed in October 1974.

The design involved a low-profile main frontage, which was 77 metres (253 ft) long, facing onto Avenue Saint-Rémy. There was a short flight of steps leading up to a glass entrance with a canopy at centre of the building. The rest of the building was fenestrated by rows of chamfered windows on each of the three floors. Internally, the principal rooms were the Salle des Mariages (wedding room) and the Salle du Conseil (council chamber), which were accessed up a grand staircase lit by a stained glass window created by the master glassmaker, Arthur Schouler.
