= Charles de Wendel =

French steel manufacturer

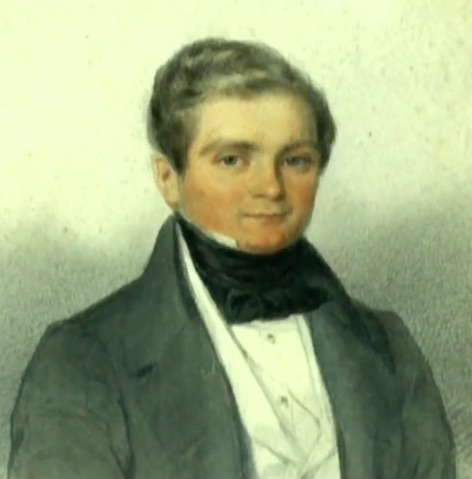

Representative for Moselle
- In office 13 May 1849 – 29 February 1852

Deputy for Moselle
- In office 29 February 1852 – 19 February 1867
- Succeeded by: Stephen Liégeard

Personal details
- Born: Alexie Charles de Wendel d'Hayange; 13 December 1809 Metz, Moselle, France
- Died: 15 April 1870 (aged 60) Paris, France
- Occupation: Steel maker, deputy

Charles de Wendel (13 December 1809 – 15 April 1870) was a French steel manufacturer in Lorraine and a deputy in the French legislative assembly.

== Origins ==
The de Wendel family can be traced back to Jean Wendel of Bruges, who married Marie de Wanderve around 1600. His descendants in the male line mostly pursued military careers. Jean's descendant Jean-Martin Wendel (1665–1737) purchased the factories of Le Comte in Hayange, Lorraine, in 1704. This was the foundation of the family's industrial operations. The purchase of the mastership of a forge carried with it a noble title, and Martin Wendel became Martin de Wendel, seigneur d'Hayange. (Note: In 1727 Martin Wendel was granted letters patent by Leopold, Duke of Lorraine that confirmed his noble quality independent of the forges. The patent noted that the nobility could not be formally proved since the titles had been "lost in the misfortune of war". After acquiring nobility the Wendel family enhanced their status by marrying into old families that had fallen on hard times. One Wendel bride, from a family that could be traced back to the middle ages, would say her people called her husband le gros quincailler (the big ironmonger.)) He was followed by eight generations of steelmakers. The Wendels lost their forge and foundry at Hayange during the French Revolution. The banker Florentin Seillière (1744–1825) helped them buy it back in 1804, and in 1811 helped them buy the nearby Moyeuvre forge.

== Early years ==
Alexis Charles de Wendel was born on 13 December 1809 in Metz, Moselle. He was the second son of François de Wendel (1778–1825) and Françoise Joséphine de Fischer de Dicourt (1784–1872). His father was deputy from 1815–16 and from 1818–25, and master of the Hayange foundry. After his father died in 1825, his mother took over management of the family business. Charles' older brother, Victor-François, was not interested in running the family business and moved from Hayange to estates on the Seille river. Charles was sixteen when his father died. He entered the École Polytechnique in 1828, and after graduating went to England to study mining and metallurgy. Charles returned to France in 1834. On 29 May 1843 Charles de Wendel married Jeanne Marie de Pechpeyrou-Comminges de Guitaut.

== Industrialist ==
Charles de Wendel had to share control of the enterprise with his mother and his brother-in-law, Baron Théodore de Gargan, which he resented, and blamed on the insistence of the Napoleonic Code on the equal rights of heirs. In the 1830s the family matriarch, Madame Joséphine de Wendel, drew up contracts through which the children and grandchildren of François de Wendel would nominally receive a cash payment as their share of the inheritance, but the money would be invested in the business, paying a low rate of return. Théodore de Gargan died in 1851 and Charles became the sole manager, but still shared ownership with his siblings and their children. On 24 April 1857 Madame de Wendel, Charles de Wendel and Théodore de Gargan junior signed a deed that established the commandite of Le Fils de Francois de Wendel et Cie. Madame de Wendel put up almost all the capital of the partnership and took 80% of the profits, while Charles took 12% and Gargan took 8%.

Wendel and Gargan greatly expanded operations at Hayange and Moyeuvre in the 1840s and 1850s. Both plants were connected by rail to the company's coal mines and coke furnaces at Stiring-Wendel and at Seraing in Belgium, alleviating a chronic shortage of coal and coke. During the metallurgy slump of 1847–50 Charles de Wendel was assisted by the Bank of France, which he fully repaid in 1851. In the crisis year of 1848 Charles de Wendel and Eugène Schneider saved the foundry at Fourchambault from bankruptcy by co-signing a huge bank loan.

In 1846 Charles de Wendel and the Parisian businessman Georges Hainguerlot bought the coal mining concession of Schœneck. Surveys proved positive, and in 1851 Wendel, Hainguerlot, the engineer Kind and the surveyor d'Hausens formed a limited company to exploit the concession, authorized in 1853 as the Compagnie des houillères de Stiring (Stiring Coal Company). The first two shafts were sunk using an innovative system designed by Kind, but ran into problems with water. A third shaft, sunk with more conventional techniques, was started in 1854 and entered production in 1856. Other shafts were sunk, and production grew steadily.

Charles de Wendel undertook construction of the very modern Stiring factory while negotiating the purchase of the Schœneck concession. It was located within the concession area and mainly manufactured railway rails. A coal extraction shaft was sunk near the factory buildings, and during the Second French Empire the Compagnie de Stiring sold coal to the Wendel company at generally favorable prices. In 1865 the Wendel metallurgical factories were taking 7/8 of the output from the Compagnie de Stiring, paying below market prices. The company records show that Charles de Wendel intervened in board meetings several times to reduce the price paid for coal by his factories. For many years Charles de Wendel undertook costly but unsuccessful experiments on removing phosphorus from pig iron. It was only in 1879, after his death, that the company obtained the rights to use the Thomas process.

Charles de Wendel and Théodore de Gargan founded the city of Stiring-Wendel. The workers' town, dominated by the factories and their managers, was a model that was followed in France into the 1930s. Charles de Wendel initiated a policy of recruiting from the children of his workers, with son following father. In the 1850s he began a system by which promotions would be assured, based on seniority, which encouraged loyalty. To ensure a supply of fuel Charles de Wendel purchased the Petite-Rosselle coal mines, He created a railway network to connect the factories to each other and to the lines of the Chemins de fer de l'Est. Charles de Wendel became an administrator of the Chemins de fer de l'Est.

Charles de Wendel supported the tariff reductions of the Anglo-French Cobden–Chevalier Treaty of 1860, saying his only regret was that his competitor, Eugène Schneider (1805–75), had been consulted beforehand and he only afterwards. What would become the Comité des forges was founded in 1864. The Committee had the goals of managing relations between the industry and government, promoting exports and coordinating prices. Eugène Schneider was the first President. There were ten members, each representing a region, including Charles de Wendel of Hayange. The Comité des forges was always handicapped by divisions between the members from the center, the north and the east of the country. For example, Charles de Wendel resented the control of the committee exerted by Schneider of Le Creusot in Burgundy.

== Politician ==
In 1848 Charles de Wendel was elected to the General Council of Moselle by acclamation. he represented the canton of Thionville. On 13 May 1849 he was elected Representative for Moselle in the legislative assembly, where he sat on the right. He fully supported the policy of Napoleon III, and approved Napoleon's coup d'etat. He was elected deputy to the legislature as the government candidate for the second district of Moselle on 29 February 1852, and reelected on 22 June 1857 and 1 June 1863, each time with a huge majority. He resigned from the legislative assembly in 1867 due to health problems. He left office on 19 February 1867 and was replaced by Stephen Liégeard.

== Death and legacy ==
Charles de Wendel was made a knight of the Legion of Honour. He died on 15 April 1870 in Paris. In 1834, when Charles de Wendel returned to France, the Wendels produced about 1% of French iron. By 1870 they produced 11.2%, and were the largest iron operation in France. At the time of his death, Wendel et Cie employed some 7,000 workers and produced 134,500 tons of pig iron and 112,500 tons of iron a year. With his death his mother, now 86, was again in charge of the family firm. After the annexation of Lorraine following the Franco-Prussian War of 1870, in December 1871 she converted the enterprise from a simple proprietorship to a société en commandite, Les Petits-files de Francois de Wendel et Cie. Her nine grandchildren were shareholders. Charles left two sons, Henri de Wendel (1844–1906) and Robert de Wendel (1847–1903), who both continued in the steel-making tradition.

== Sources ==
- "Comité des forges", Encyclopédie Larousse (in French), Éditions Larousse
- Desmars, Bernard (July–September 1998), "La Difficile Genèse du Bassin Houiller Lorrain (1815-1870)", Histoire, Économie et Société, 17 (3, L'État Comme Fonctionnement Socio-symbolique (vers 1547-vers 1635)), Armand Colin: 505–529, doi:10.3406/hes.1998.1999, JSTOR 23612599
- Gill, Graeme (2008-05-15), Bourgeoisie, State and Democracy: Russia, Britain, France, Germany, and the USA, OUP Oxford, ISBN 978-0-19-954468-4
- Gille, Bertrand (1968), La Sidérurgie française au XIXe siècle: Recherches histioriques (in French), Librairie Droz, ISBN 978-2-600-04046-4
- Gordon, David M. (1996), Liberalism and Social Reform: Industrial Growth and Progressiste Politics in France, 1880-1914, Greenwood Publishing Group, ISBN 978-0-313-29811-0
- James, Harold (2006), FAMILY CAPITALISM, Harvard University Press, ISBN 978-0-674-02181-5
- Kindleberger, C. P. (1961), "Foreign Trade and Economic Growth: Lessons from Britain and France, 1850 to 1913", The Economic History Review, New Series, 14 (2), Wiley on behalf of the Economic History Society: 289–305, doi:10.2307/2593225, JSTOR 2593225
- Landes, David S. (1999-05-17), The Wealth and Poverty of Nations: Why Some Are So Rich and Some So Poor, W. W. Norton, ISBN 978-0-393-06981-5
- "Le Château", Le Château Guy de Wendel, archived from the original on 2017-06-28
- Milkereit, Gertrud (August 1966), "Die Diskussion Um Das Moselkanalprojekt In Seiner Verknüpfung Mit Der Einführung Des Thomasverfahrens In Der Westdeutschen Eisen- Und Stahlindustrie 1883—1890.", Tradition: Zeitschrift für Firmengeschichte und Unternehmerbiographie, 11 (4), Verlag C.H.Beck: 184–199, doi:10.1515/zug-1966-0404, JSTOR 40697021, S2CID 189275323
- Priouret, Roger (1992-02-04), Origines du patronat français, Grasset, ISBN 978-2-246-79486-8
- Quépat, Nérée (1887), "WENDEL (Alexis-Charles de)", Dictionnaire biographique de l'ancien département de la Moselle contenant toutes les personnes notables..., Picard
- Robert, Adolphe; Cougny, Gaston (1889), "Alexis, Charles de Wendel", Dictionnaire des parlementaires français de 1789 à 1889 (in French), Assemblée nationale
- Smith, Michael Stephen (2006), The Emergence of Modern Business Enterprise in France, 1800-1930, Harvard University Press, ISBN 978-0-674-01939-3
- The De Wendel Company, Three Centuries of Industry in Lorraine (1704-2004), Musée d'Orsay
- "Wendel", Section Genealogique, Association Artistique de la Banque de France
