= Communauté d'agglomération de Forbach Porte de France =

Forbach Porte de France
- Communauté d'agglomération
- Interactive map of Forbach Porte de France
- Coordinates: 49°10′N 06°55′E
- Country: France
- Region: Grand Est
- Department: Moselle
- No. of communes: {{{nbcomm}}}
- Established: 2003
- Area: 139.1 km^{2} (53.7 sq mi)
- Population (2019): 76,764
  - Density: 551.9/km^{2} (1,429/sq mi)
- Website: www.agglo-forbach.fr

Communauté d'agglomération de Forbach Porte de France is the communauté d'agglomération, an intercommunal structure, centred on the town of Forbach. It is located in the Moselle department, in the Grand Est region, northeastern France. Created in 2003, its seat is in Forbach. Its area is 139.1 km^{2}. Its population was 76,764 in 2019, of which 21,597 in Forbach proper.

== Composition ==
The communauté d'agglomération consists of the following 21 communes:

1. Alsting
2. Behren-lès-Forbach
3. Bousbach
4. Cocheren
5. Diebling
6. Etzling
7. Farschviller
8. Folkling
9. Forbach
10. Kerbach
11. Metzing
12. Morsbach
13. Nousseviller-Saint-Nabor
14. Œting
15. Petite-Rosselle
16. Rosbruck
17. Schœneck
18. Spicheren
19. Stiring-Wendel
20. Tenteling
21. Théding
