= Schœneck =

- Commune
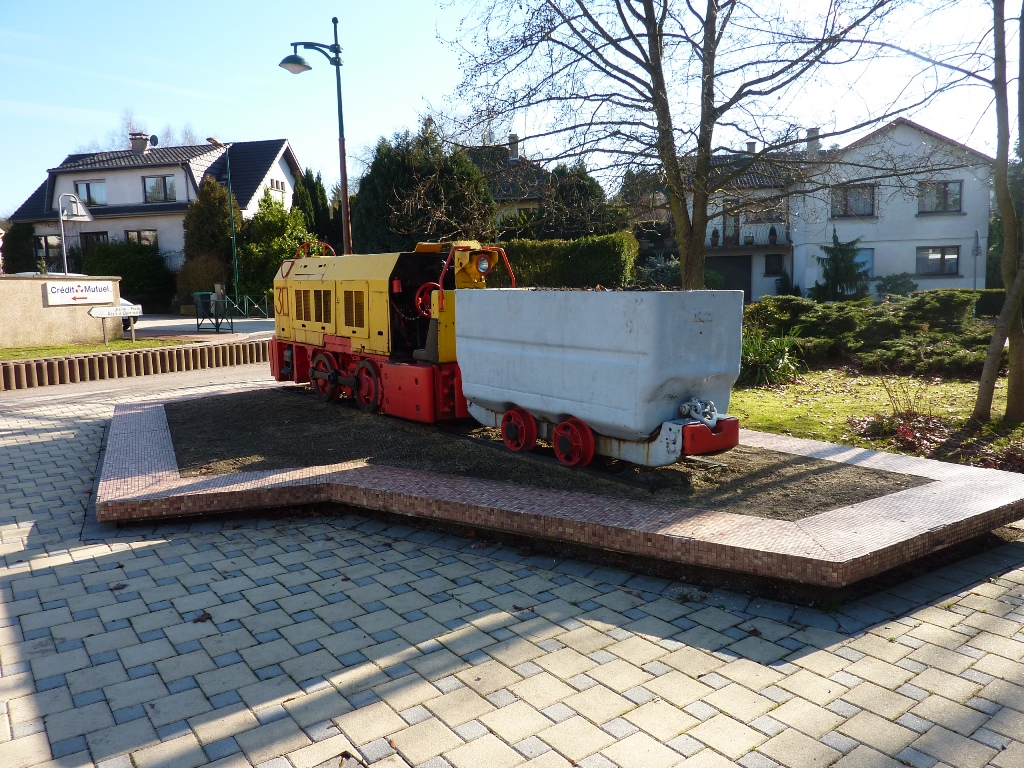
- A locomotive monument in Schœneck

- Coat of arms
- Location of Schœneck
- Location within France Location within Grand Est
- Coordinates: 49°13′14″N 6°55′29″E
- Country: France
- Region: Grand Est
- Department: Moselle
- Arrondissement: Forbach-Boulay-Moselle
- Canton: Forbach
- Intercommunality: CA Forbach Porte de France

Government
  - Mayor (2020–2026): Gabriel Bastian
- Area^{1}: 4.06 km^{2} (1.57 sq mi)
- Elevation: 200 m (660 ft)
- Highest elevation: 281 m (922 ft)
- Lowest elevation: 207 m (679 ft)
- Population (2023): 2,435
  - Density: 600/km^{2} (1,550/sq mi)
- Time zone: UTC+01:00 (CET)
  - Summer (DST): UTC+02:00 (CEST)
- INSEE/Postal code: 57638 /57350
- ^{1} French Land Register data, which excludes lakes, ponds, glaciers > 1 km^{2} (0.386 sq mi or 247 acres) and river estuaries.

Schœneck (French pronunciation: [ʃœnɛk]; German: Schöneck) is a commune in the Moselle department in Grand Est in north-eastern France. It is located in the Warndt Basin, and is a border town with Germany, wedged between Stiring-Wendel and Saarbrücken.

== Population ==
Historical population
Year	Pop.	±% p.a.
1968	2,128	—
1975	2,422	+1.87%
1982	2,541	+0.69%
1990	2,375	−0.84%
1999	2,761	+1.69%
2007	2,742	−0.09%
2012	2,769	+0.20%
2017	2,570	−1.48%
2023	2,435	−0.90%
Source: INSEE

== Coal concession ==
In 1846 Charles de Wendel and the Parisian businessman Georges Hainguerlot bought the coal mining concession of Schœneck. Surveys proved positive, and in 1851 Wendel, Hainguerlot, the engineer Kind and the surveyor d'Hausens formed a limited company to exploit the concession, authorized in 1853 as the Compagnie des houillères de Stiring (Stiring Coal Company). The first two shafts were sunk using an innovative system designed by Kind, but ran into problems with water. A third shaft, sunk with more conventional techniques, was started in 1854 and entered production in 1856. Other shafts were sunk, and production grew steadily.

== See also ==
- Communes of the Moselle department

== Sources ==
- Desmars, Bernard (July–September 1998), "La Difficile Genèse du Bassin Houiller Lorrain (1815-1870)", Histoire, Économie et Société, 17 (3, L'État Comme Fonctionnement Socio-symbolique (vers 1547-vers 1635)), Armand Colin, JSTOR 23612599
