= Nousseviller-Saint-Nabor =

- Commune
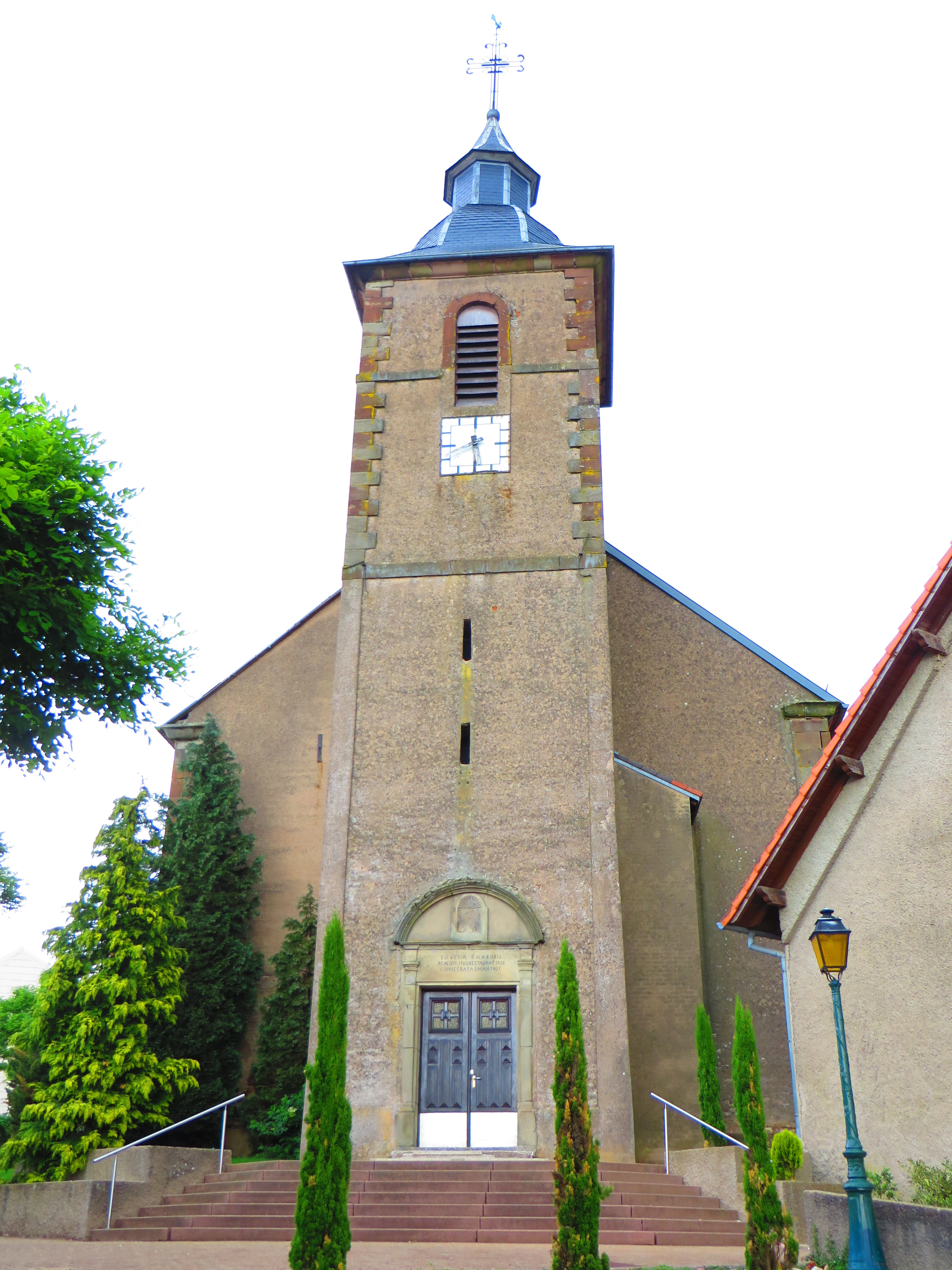
- The church in Nousseviller-Saint-Nabor

- Coat of arms
- Location of Nousseviller-Saint-Nabor
- Location within France Location within Grand Est
- Coordinates: 49°07′12″N 6°58′17″E
- Country: France
- Region: Grand Est
- Department: Moselle
- Arrondissement: Forbach-Boulay-Moselle
- Canton: Stiring-Wendel
- Intercommunality: CA Forbach Porte de France

Government
  - Mayor (2020–2026): Grégory Michels
- Area^{1}: 6.13 km^{2} (2.37 sq mi)
- Elevation: 324 m (1,063 ft)
- Highest elevation: 372 m (1,220 ft)
- Lowest elevation: 255 m (837 ft)
- Population (2023): 1,182
  - Density: 193/km^{2} (499/sq mi)
- Time zone: UTC+01:00 (CET)
  - Summer (DST): UTC+02:00 (CEST)
- INSEE/Postal code: 57514 /57990
- ^{1} French Land Register data, which excludes lakes, ponds, glaciers > 1 km^{2} (0.386 sq mi or 247 acres) and river estuaries.

Nousseviller-Saint-Nabor (French pronunciation: [nusvilɛʁ sɛ̃ nabɔʁ]; German: Nussweiler bei Sankt Nabor) is a commune in the Moselle department in Grand Est in north-eastern France.

== See also ==
- Communes of the Moselle department
