= Bousbach =

- Commune
- Coat of arms
- Location of Bousbach
- Location within France Location within Grand Est
- Coordinates: 49°08′56″N 6°56′59″E
- Country: France
- Region: Grand Est
- Department: Moselle
- Arrondissement: Forbach-Boulay-Moselle
- Canton: Stiring-Wendel
- Intercommunality: CA Forbach Porte de France

Government
  - Mayor (2020–2026): Constant Kieffer
- Area^{1}: 5.91 km^{2} (2.28 sq mi)
- Elevation: 283 m (928 ft)
- Highest elevation: 365 m (1,198 ft)
- Lowest elevation: 246 m (807 ft)
- Population (2023): 1,179
  - Density: 199/km^{2} (517/sq mi)
- Time zone: UTC+01:00 (CET)
  - Summer (DST): UTC+02:00 (CEST)
- INSEE/Postal code: 57101 /57460
- ^{1} French Land Register data, which excludes lakes, ponds, glaciers > 1 km^{2} (0.386 sq mi or 247 acres) and river estuaries.

Bousbach (French pronunciation: [busbak]; German: Buschbach) is a commune in the Moselle department in Grand Est in northeastern France.

== Etymology ==
Bousbach has historically been attested as Buezbach in 1429 and Buschbach in 1525. Bousbach and its German counterpart are Germanic in origin, deriving from a High German dialect, ultimately from Proto-West-Germanic *busk. The Germanic hydronym *-bak(i) entered the French language via High German, and took on two forms: the Germanic form -bach and Romantic -bais.

== Population ==
Historical population
Year	Pop.	±% p.a.
1968	649	—
1975	725	+1.59%
1982	843	+2.18%
1990	913	+1.00%
1999	950	+0.44%
2007	1,123	+2.11%
2012	1,142	+0.34%
2017	1,226	+1.43%
2023	1,179	−0.65%
Source: INSEE

== See also ==
- Communes of the Moselle department
