= Théding =

- Commune
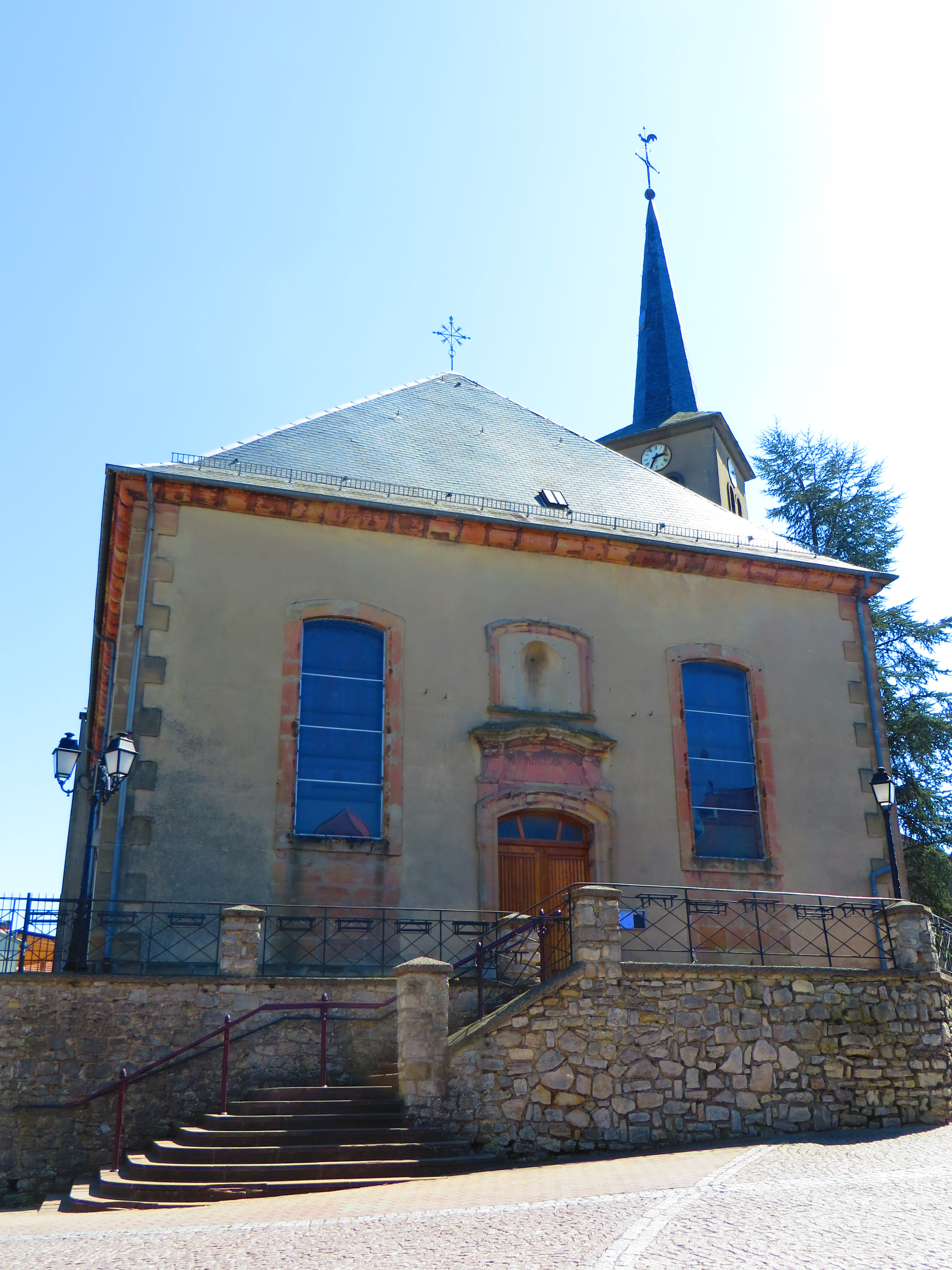
- The church in Théding

- Coat of arms
- Location of Théding
- Location within France Location within Grand Est
- Coordinates: 49°07′45″N 6°53′38″E
- Country: France
- Region: Grand Est
- Department: Moselle
- Arrondissement: Forbach-Boulay-Moselle
- Canton: Stiring-Wendel
- Intercommunality: CA Forbach Porte de France

Government
  - Mayor (2020–2026): Jean-Paul Hilpert
- Area^{1}: 8.13 km^{2} (3.14 sq mi)
- Elevation: 340 m (1,120 ft)
- Highest elevation: 378 m (1,240 ft)
- Lowest elevation: 223 m (732 ft)
- Population (2023): 2,408
  - Density: 296/km^{2} (767/sq mi)
- Time zone: UTC+01:00 (CET)
  - Summer (DST): UTC+02:00 (CEST)
- INSEE/Postal code: 57669 /57450
- ^{1} French Land Register data, which excludes lakes, ponds, glaciers > 1 km^{2} (0.386 sq mi or 247 acres) and river estuaries.

Théding (French pronunciation: [tedɛ̃]; German: Thedingen) is a commune in the Moselle department in Grand Est in north-eastern France.

== Population ==
Historical population
Year	Pop.	±% p.a.
1968	1,559	—
1975	1,561	+0.02%
1982	1,761	+1.74%
1990	2,059	+1.97%
1999	2,132	+0.39%
2007	2,274	+0.81%
2012	2,451	+1.51%
2017	2,501	+0.40%
2023	2,408	−0.63%
Source: INSEE

== See also ==
- Communes of the Moselle department
