= Canton of Stiring-Wendel =

Administrative division of Moselle in northeastern France

Coordinates: 49.20°N 6.93°E

The canton of Stiring-Wendel is an administrative division of the Moselle department, northeastern France. Its borders were modified at the French canton reorganisation which came into effect in March 2015. Its seat is in Stiring-Wendel.

It consists of the following communes:

1. Alsting
2. Behren-lès-Forbach
3. Bousbach
4. Diebling
5. Etzling
6. Farschviller
7. Folkling
8. Kerbach
9. Metzing
10. Nousseviller-Saint-Nabor
11. Spicheren
12. Stiring-Wendel
13. Tenteling
14. Théding
