= Canton of Forbach =

Coordinates: 49.19°N 6.90°E

The canton of Forbach is an administrative division of the Moselle department, northeastern France. Its borders were modified at the French canton reorganisation which came into effect in March 2015. Its seat is in Forbach.

It consists of the following communes:

1. Cocheren
2. Forbach
3. Morsbach
4. Œting
5. Petite-Rosselle
6. Rosbruck
7. Schœneck
