= Metzing =

- Commune
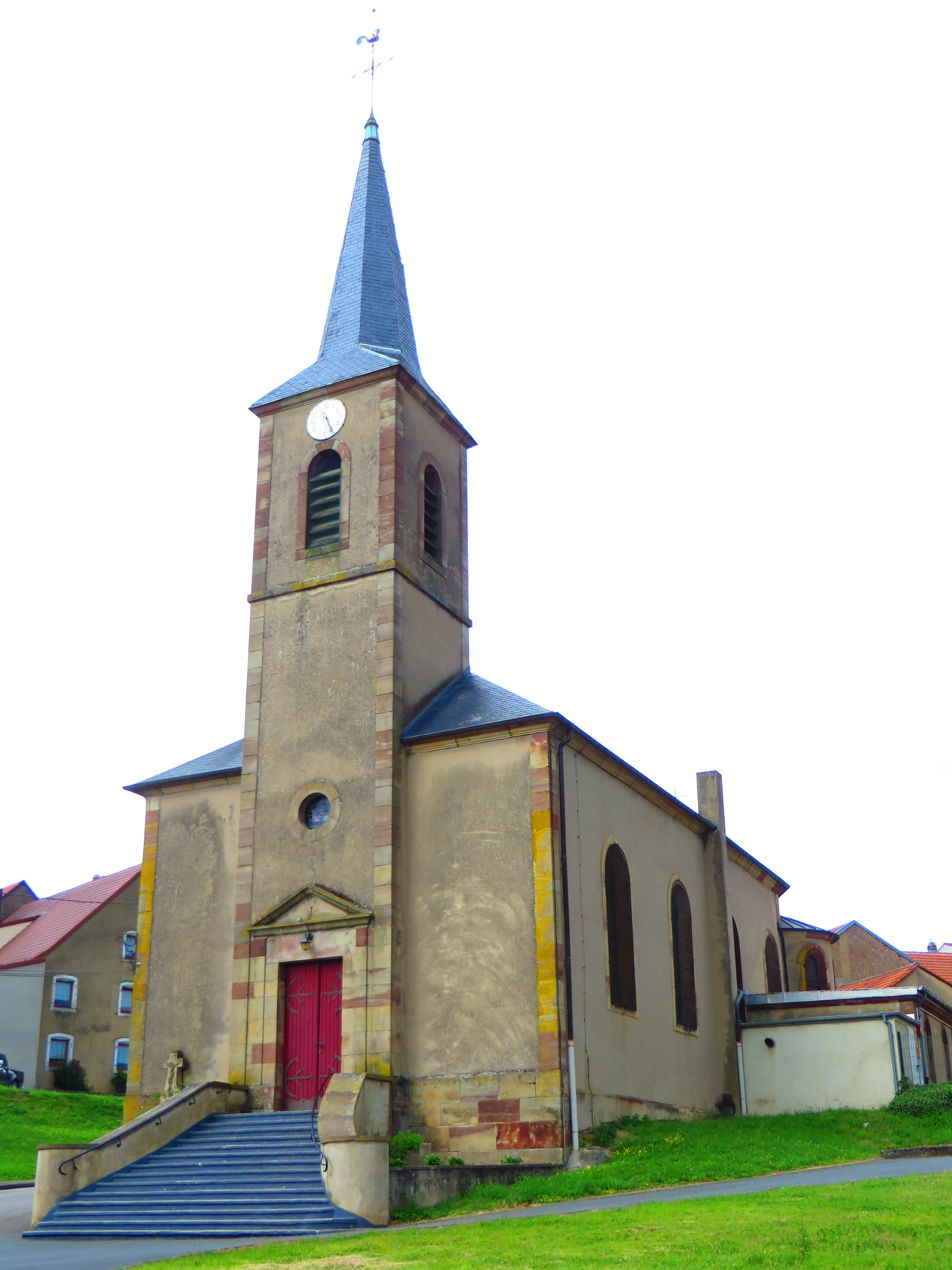
- The church in Metzing

- Coat of arms
- Location of Metzing
- Location within France Location within Grand Est
- Coordinates: 49°06′28″N 6°57′36″E
- Country: France
- Region: Grand Est
- Department: Moselle
- Arrondissement: Forbach-Boulay-Moselle
- Canton: Stiring-Wendel
- Intercommunality: CA Forbach Porte de France

Government
  - Mayor (2020–2026): Fernand Meyer
- Area^{1}: 6.45 km^{2} (2.49 sq mi)
- Elevation: 250 m (820 ft)
- Highest elevation: 329 m (1,079 ft)
- Lowest elevation: 213 m (699 ft)
- Population (2023): 702
  - Density: 109/km^{2} (282/sq mi)
- Time zone: UTC+01:00 (CET)
  - Summer (DST): UTC+02:00 (CEST)
- INSEE/Postal code: 57466 /57980
- ^{1} French Land Register data, which excludes lakes, ponds, glaciers > 1 km^{2} (0.386 sq mi or 247 acres) and river estuaries.

Metzing (French pronunciation: [mɛtsɛ̃]; German: Metzingen) is a commune in the Moselle department in Grand Est in north-eastern France.

== See also ==
- Communes of the Moselle department
