= Tenteling =

- Commune
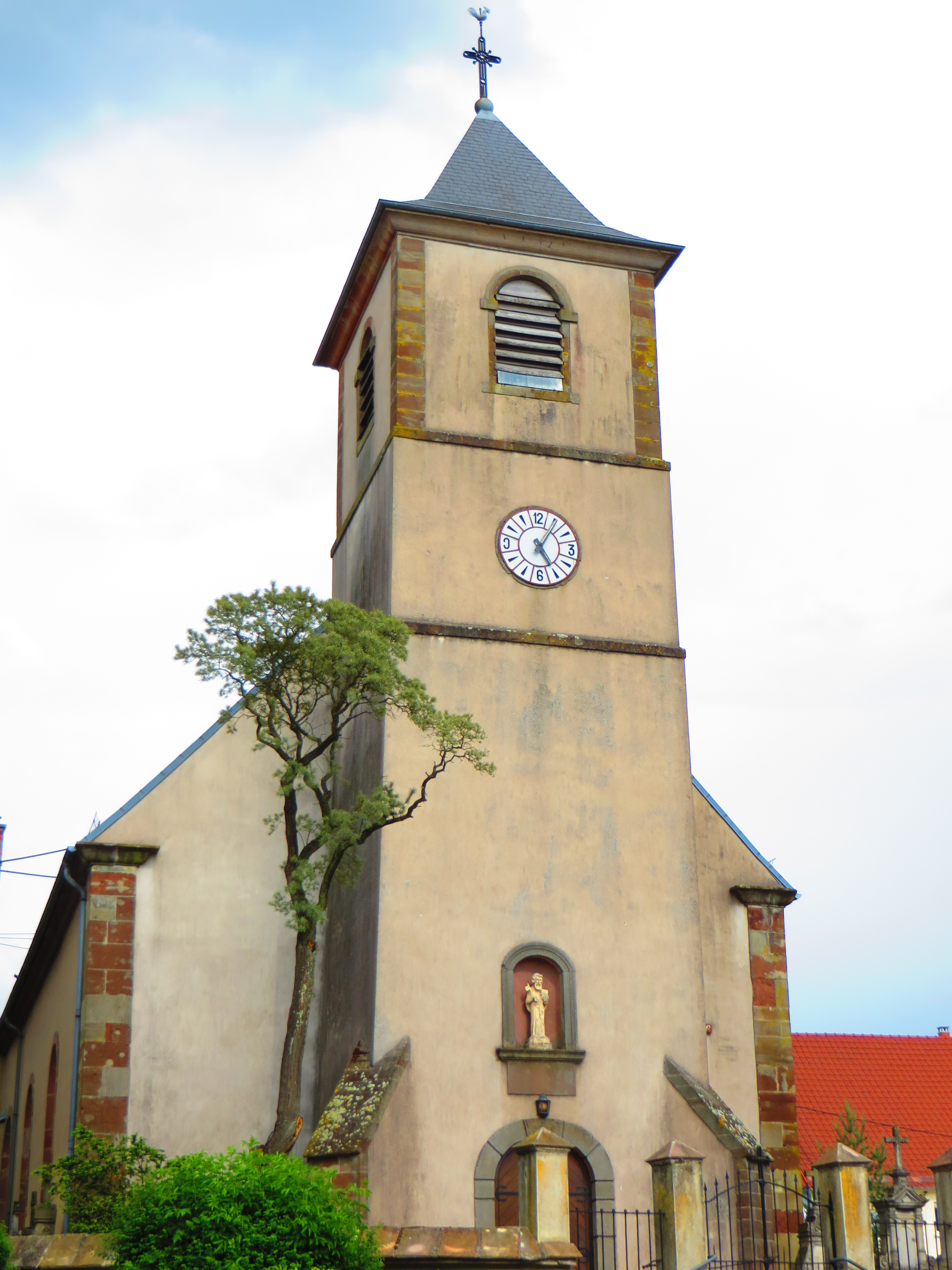
- The church in Tenteling

- Coat of arms
- Location of Tenteling
- Location within France Location within Grand Est
- Coordinates: 49°07′34″N 6°56′22″E
- Country: France
- Region: Grand Est
- Department: Moselle
- Arrondissement: Forbach-Boulay-Moselle
- Canton: Stiring-Wendel
- Intercommunality: CA Forbach Porte de France

Government
  - Mayor (2020–2026): Ralph Klein
- Area^{1}: 7.19 km^{2} (2.78 sq mi)
- Elevation: 300 m (980 ft)
- Highest elevation: 362 m (1,188 ft)
- Lowest elevation: 245 m (804 ft)
- Population (2023): 1,043
  - Density: 145/km^{2} (376/sq mi)
- Time zone: UTC+01:00 (CET)
  - Summer (DST): UTC+02:00 (CEST)
- INSEE/Postal code: 57665 /57980
- ^{1} French Land Register data, which excludes lakes, ponds, glaciers > 1 km^{2} (0.386 sq mi or 247 acres) and river estuaries.

Tenteling (French pronunciation: [tɑ̃tlɛ̃]; German: Tentelingen) is a commune in the Moselle department in Grand Est in north-eastern France. Tenteling consists of the villages Tenteling and Ebring.

== See also ==
- Communes of the Moselle department
