= Œting =

- Commune
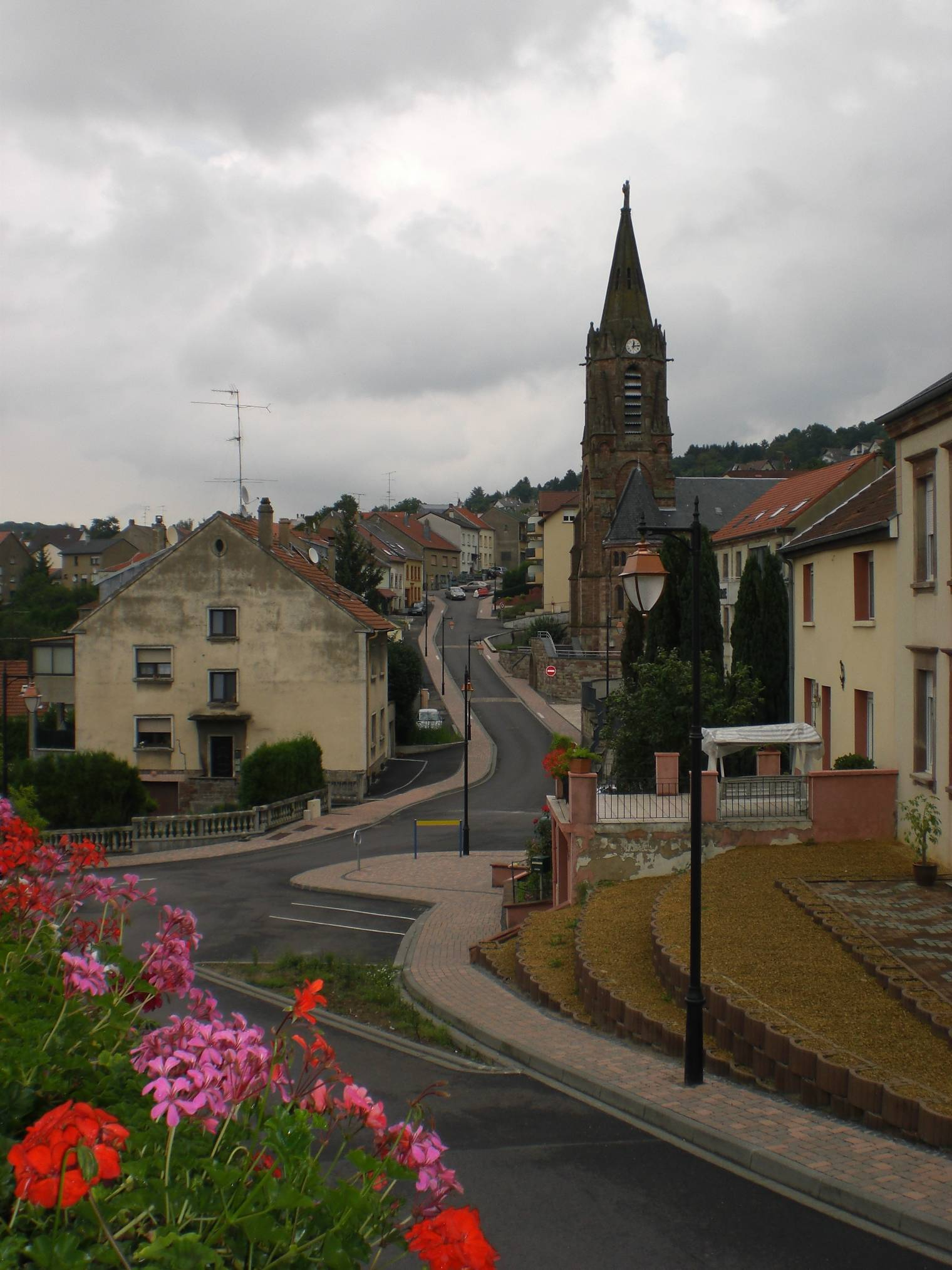
- The church and surroundings in Œting

- Coat of arms
- Location of Œting
- Location within France Location within Grand Est
- Coordinates: 49°10′28″N 6°54′56″E
- Country: France
- Region: Grand Est
- Department: Moselle
- Arrondissement: Forbach-Boulay-Moselle
- Canton: Forbach
- Intercommunality: CA Forbach Porte de France

Government
  - Mayor (2020–2026): Germain Derudder
- Area^{1}: 4.39 km^{2} (1.69 sq mi)
- Highest elevation: 387 m (1,270 ft)
- Lowest elevation: 218 m (715 ft)
- Population (2023): 2,599
  - Density: 592/km^{2} (1,530/sq mi)
- Time zone: UTC+01:00 (CET)
  - Summer (DST): UTC+02:00 (CEST)
- INSEE/Postal code: 57521 /57600
- ^{1} French Land Register data, which excludes lakes, ponds, glaciers > 1 km^{2} (0.386 sq mi or 247 acres) and river estuaries.

Œting (French pronunciation: [øtɛ̃]; German: Ötingen) is a commune in the Moselle department in Grand Est in north-eastern France.

== Population ==
Historical population
Year	Pop.	±% p.a.
1968	1,262	—
1975	1,489	+2.39%
1982	1,670	+1.65%
1990	1,920	+1.76%
1999	1,865	−0.32%
2007	2,461	+3.53%
2012	2,604	+1.14%
2017	2,679	+0.57%
2023	2,599	−0.50%
Source: INSEE

== See also ==
- Communes of the Moselle department
