= Alsting =

- Commune
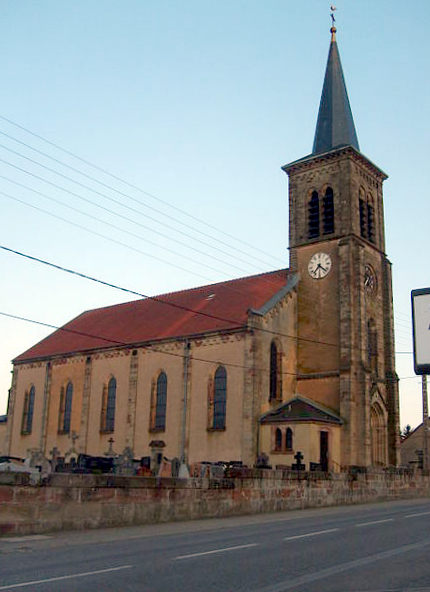
- The church in Alsting

- Coat of arms
- Location of Alsting
- Location within France Location within Grand Est
- Coordinates: 49°10′47″N 6°59′56″E
- Country: France
- Region: Grand Est
- Department: Moselle
- Arrondissement: Forbach-Boulay-Moselle
- Canton: Stiring-Wendel
- Intercommunality: CA Forbach Porte de France

Government
  - Mayor (2020–2026): Jean-Claude Hehn
- Area^{1}: 5.73 km^{2} (2.21 sq mi)
- Highest elevation: 362 m (1,188 ft)
- Lowest elevation: 197 m (646 ft)
- Population (2023): 2,480
  - Density: 433/km^{2} (1,120/sq mi)
- Time zone: UTC+01:00 (CET)
  - Summer (DST): UTC+02:00 (CEST)
- INSEE/Postal code: 57013 /57515
- ^{1} French Land Register data, which excludes lakes, ponds, glaciers > 1 km^{2} (0.386 sq mi or 247 acres) and river estuaries.

Alsting (French pronunciation: [alstɛ̃]; German: Alstingen) is a commune in the Moselle department in Grand Est in northeastern France.

== Population ==
Historical population
Year	Pop.	±% p.a.
1968	1,905	—
1975	2,017	+0.82%
1982	2,209	+1.31%
1990	2,574	+1.93%
1999	2,664	+0.38%
2007	2,739	+0.35%
2012	2,623	−0.86%
2017	2,589	−0.26%
2023	2,480	−0.71%
Source: INSEE

== See also ==
- Communes of the Moselle department
