= Stiring-Wendel =

- Commune
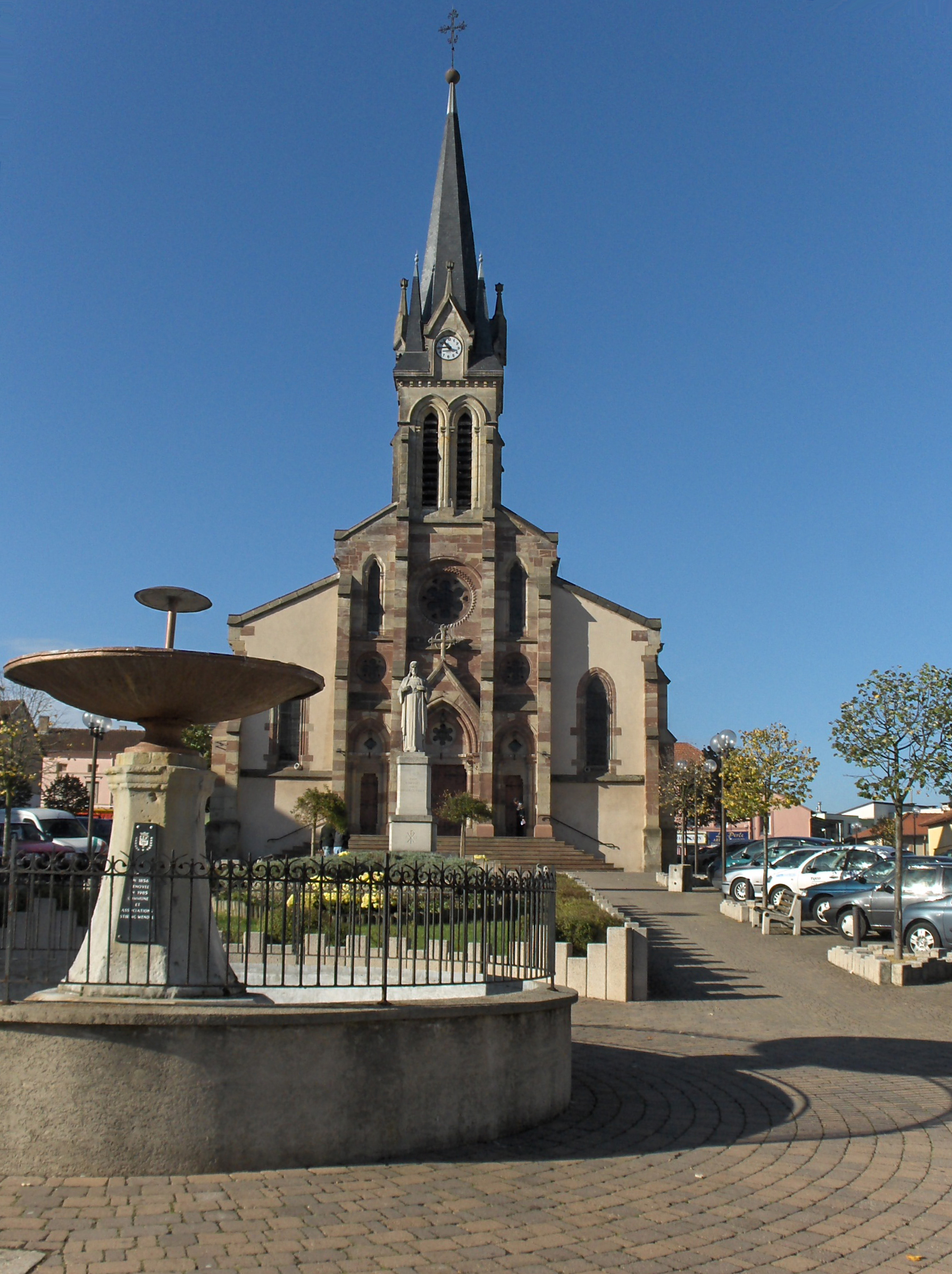
- Église Saint-François

- Coat of arms
- Location of Stiring-Wendel
- Location within France Location within Grand Est
- Coordinates: 49°12′N 6°56′E
- Country: France
- Region: Grand Est
- Department: Moselle
- Arrondissement: Forbach-Boulay-Moselle
- Canton: Stiring-Wendel
- Intercommunality: CA Forbach Porte de France

Government
  - Mayor (2020–2026): Yves Ludwig
- Area^{1}: 3.6 km^{2} (1.4 sq mi)
- Elevation: 240 m (790 ft)
- Highest elevation: 254 m (833 ft)
- Lowest elevation: 205 m (673 ft)
- Population (2023): 10,956
  - Density: 3,000/km^{2} (7,900/sq mi)
- Time zone: UTC+01:00 (CET)
  - Summer (DST): UTC+02:00 (CEST)
- INSEE/Postal code: 57660 /57350
- ^{1} French Land Register data, which excludes lakes, ponds, glaciers > 1 km^{2} (0.386 sq mi or 247 acres) and river estuaries.

Stiring-Wendel (French pronunciation: [stiʁɛ̃ vɑ̃dɛl]; Lorraine Franconian: Stiringe; German Stieringen-Wendel) is a commune in the Moselle department in Grand Est in north-eastern France, wedged between Forbach, Schœneck, Spicheren and Saarbrücken.

== History ==
Charles de Wendel undertook construction of the very modern Stiring factory in 1846, mainly to manufacture railway rails. A coal extraction shaft was sunk near the factory buildings, and during the Second French Empire the Compagnie de Stiring sold coal to the Wendel company at generally favorable prices. In 1865 the Wendel metallurgical factories were taking 7/8 of the output from the Compagnie de Stiring, paying below market prices.

Charles de Wendel and his partner Théodore de Gargan founded the city of Stiring-Wendel. The workers' town, dominated by the factories and their managers, was a model that was followed in France into the 1930s. Charles de Wendel initiated a policy of recruiting from the children of his workers, with son following father. In the 1850s he began a system by which promotions would be assured, based on seniority, which encouraged loyalty. The industrial family Wendel built a church, a school and residential facilities for the workers.

By imperial decree of Napoleon III, the city was elevated to a fully autonomous municipality on 3 June 1857, and separate from Forbach. Fighting occurred in the area on 6 August 1870 during the Franco-Prussian War. After the Prussian victory, the city as part of Alsace-Lorraine came under German control. The steel industry collapsed with its final closure in 1897. In 1897 the rise of the coal industry generated a new economy, and led to an increase in population. For example, in 1857 the population was 1900, where by 1957 it had grown to 16,000 residents.

After World War I, in 1918, Alsace-Lorraine came under French control once again.

There was significant combat in the Forbach and Stiring-Wendel area during World War II. Due to its location in between the French Maginot Line and German Siegfried Line, the town's population was evacuated in 1939. During the German occupation, Stiring-Wendel held many POW camps, where inmates were forced to work the mines. The town was liberated by the 70th Infantry Division of the US Army on 2 March 1945. Most of the armored American forces in this area turned north at this point to counter the German advance into Belgium ("Battle of the Bulge").

France began administering the German Saar region as a protectorate after World War II. The Marshall Plan returned the Saar to German control in 1957, due to both economic and political demands. The borders of Germany and France were then aligned to the positions before 1870, drawing the border line right next to Stiring-Wendel.

The people of Forbach and Stiring-Wendel are generally bi-lingual (French-German).

== Population ==
Historical population
Year	Pop.	±% p.a.
1968	13,757	—
1975	12,665	−1.17%
1982	13,581	+1.00%
1990	13,743	+0.15%
1999	13,129	−0.51%
2007	12,468	−0.64%
2012	12,606	+0.22%
2017	11,618	−1.62%
2023	10,956	−0.97%
Source: INSEE

== Notable people from Stiring-Wendel ==
- Sophie Huber, Beijing 2008 Olympics swimmer (born in Forbach)
- Patricia Kaas, singer (born in Forbach)
- Nicolas Untersteller, famous painter and member of Académie des Beaux-Arts
- Charles de Wendel, industrialist, founder

== See also ==
- Communes of the Moselle department

== Sources ==
- Desmars, Bernard (July–September 1998), "La Difficile Genèse du Bassin Houiller Lorrain (1815-1870)", Histoire, Économie et Société, 17 (3, L'État Comme Fonctionnement Socio-symbolique (vers 1547-vers 1635)), Armand Colin: 505–529, doi:10.3406/hes.1998.1999, JSTOR 23612599
- Gordon, David M. (1996), Liberalism and Social Reform: Industrial Growth and Progressiste Politics in France, 1880-1914, Greenwood Publishing Group, ISBN 978-0-313-29811-0
- The De Wendel Company, Three Centuries of Industry in Lorraine (1704-2004), Musée d'Orsay
