= Farschviller =

- Commune
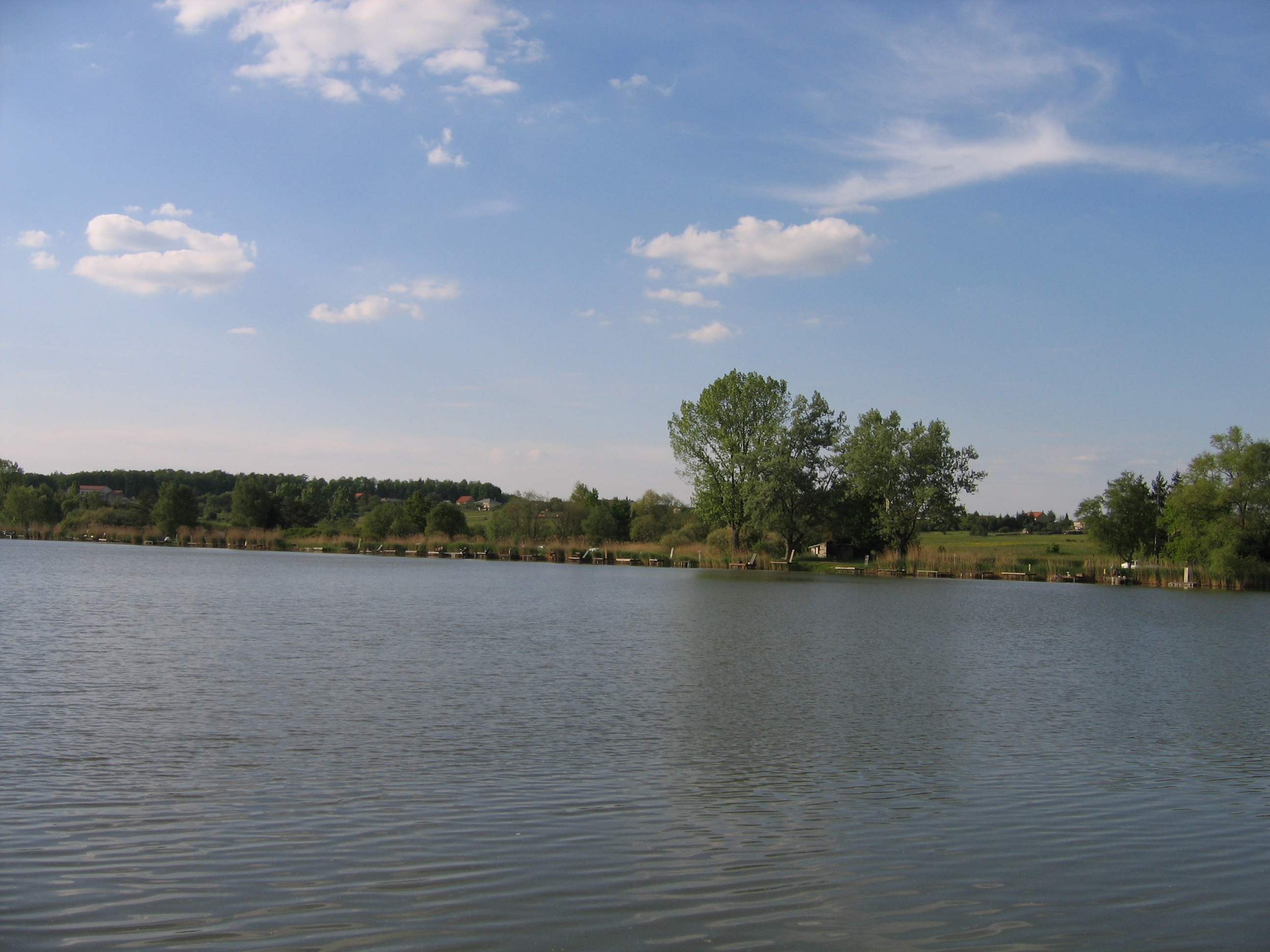
- The lake in Farschviller

- Coat of arms
- Location of Farschviller
- Location within France Location within Grand Est
- Coordinates: 49°05′38″N 6°53′42″E
- Country: France
- Region: Grand Est
- Department: Moselle
- Arrondissement: Forbach-Boulay-Moselle
- Canton: Stiring-Wendel
- Intercommunality: CA Forbach Porte de France

Government
  - Mayor (2020–2026): Christophe Muller
- Area^{1}: 11.25 km^{2} (4.34 sq mi)
- Highest elevation: 291 m (955 ft)
- Lowest elevation: 232 m (761 ft)
- Population (2023): 1,318
  - Density: 117.2/km^{2} (303.4/sq mi)
- Time zone: UTC+01:00 (CET)
  - Summer (DST): UTC+02:00 (CEST)
- INSEE/Postal code: 57208 /57450
- ^{1} French Land Register data, which excludes lakes, ponds, glaciers > 1 km^{2} (0.386 sq mi or 247 acres) and river estuaries.

Farschviller (French pronunciation: [faʁʃvilɛʁ]; German: Farschweiler) is a commune in the Moselle department in Grand Est in north-eastern France.

== See also ==
- Communes of the Moselle department
