= Etzling =

- Commune
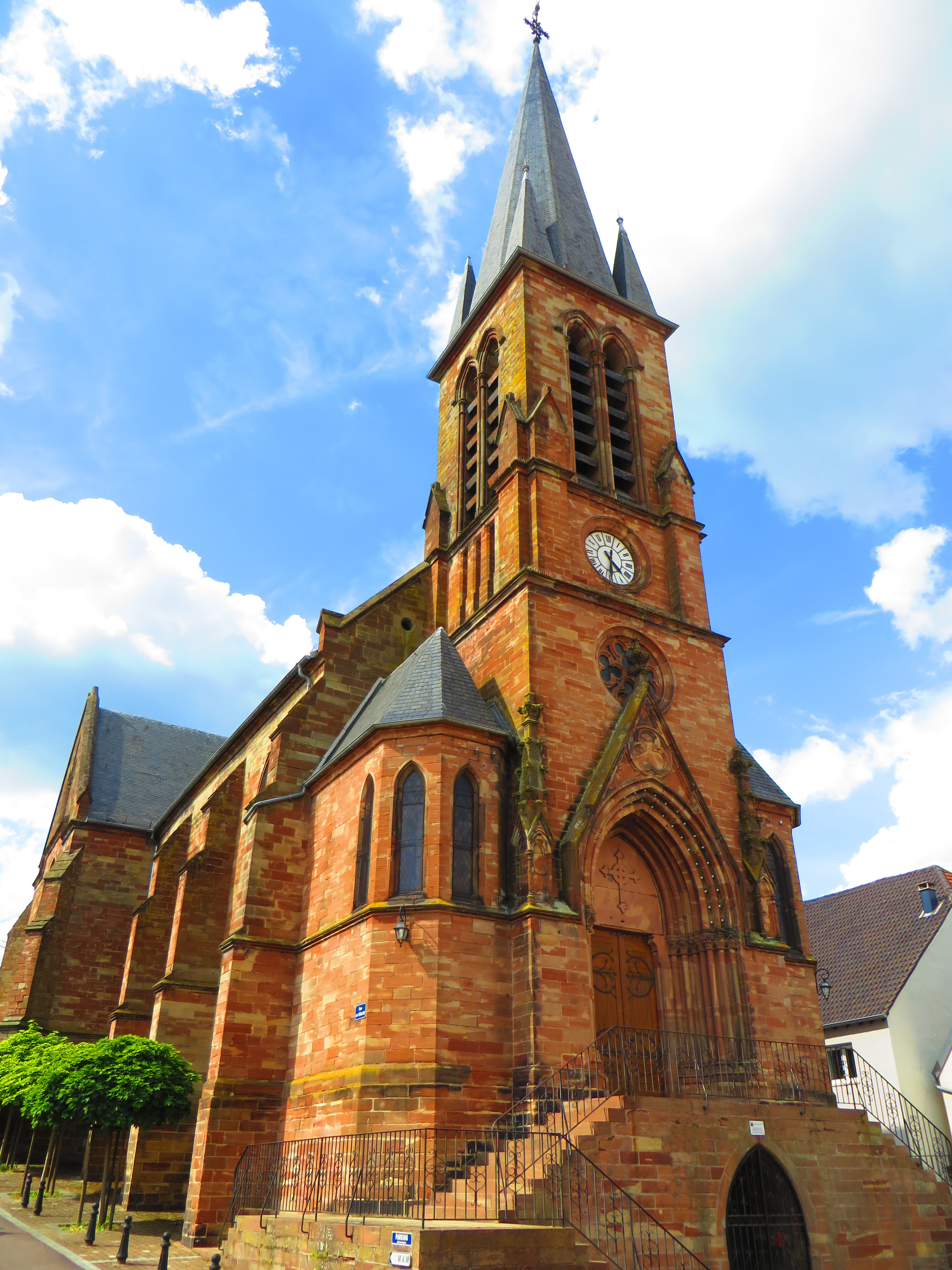
- The church in Etzling

- Coat of arms
- Location of Etzling
- Location within France Location within Grand Est
- Coordinates: 49°10′45″N 6°57′47″E
- Country: France
- Region: Grand Est
- Department: Moselle
- Arrondissement: Forbach-Boulay-Moselle
- Canton: Stiring-Wendel
- Intercommunality: CA Forbach Porte de France

Government
  - Mayor (2020–2026): Jean-Luc Jehin
- Area^{1}: 4.94 km^{2} (1.91 sq mi)
- Elevation: 350 m (1,150 ft)
- Highest elevation: 386 m (1,266 ft)
- Lowest elevation: 265 m (869 ft)
- Population (2023): 1,136
  - Density: 230/km^{2} (596/sq mi)
- Time zone: UTC+01:00 (CET)
  - Summer (DST): UTC+02:00 (CEST)
- INSEE/Postal code: 57202 /57460
- ^{1} French Land Register data, which excludes lakes, ponds, glaciers > 1 km^{2} (0.386 sq mi or 247 acres) and river estuaries.

Etzling (French pronunciation: [ɛtslɛ̃]; German: Etzlingen) is a commune in the Moselle department in Grand Est in north-eastern France.

== See also ==
- Communes of the Moselle department
