= Diebling =

- Commune
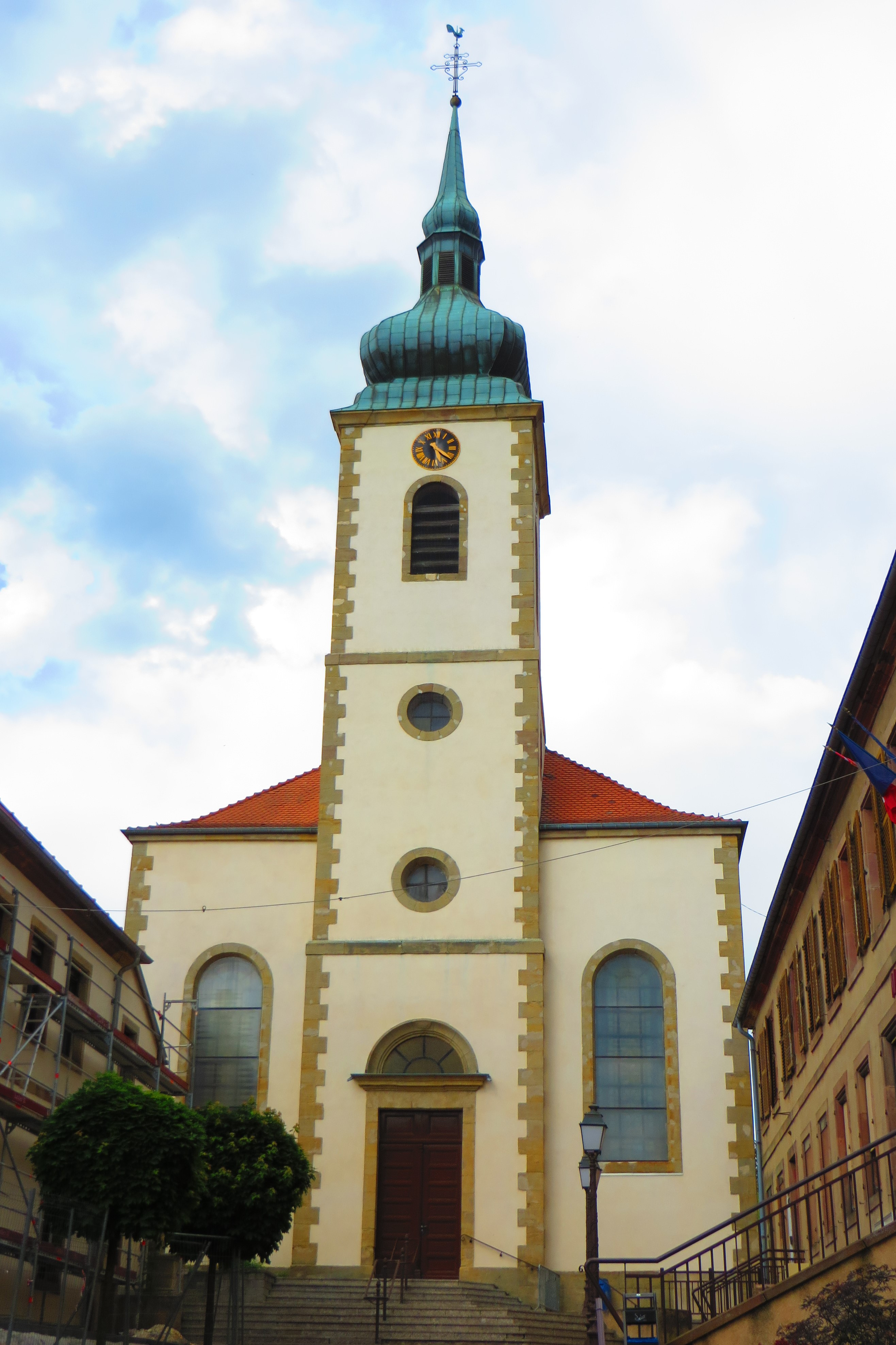
- The church in Diebling

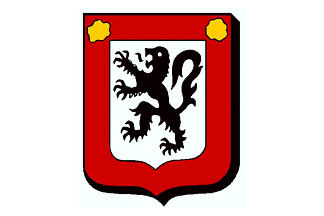
- Flag Coat of arms
- Location of Diebling
- Location within France Location within Grand Est
- Coordinates: 49°06′34″N 6°56′28″E
- Country: France
- Region: Grand Est
- Department: Moselle
- Arrondissement: Forbach-Boulay-Moselle
- Canton: Stiring-Wendel
- Intercommunality: CA Forbach Porte de France

Government
  - Mayor (2020–2026): Honoré Greff
- Area^{1}: 7.84 km^{2} (3.03 sq mi)
- Elevation: 200 m (660 ft)
- Highest elevation: 340 m (1,120 ft)
- Lowest elevation: 225 m (738 ft)
- Population (2023): 1,658
  - Density: 211/km^{2} (548/sq mi)
- Time zone: UTC+01:00 (CET)
  - Summer (DST): UTC+02:00 (CEST)
- INSEE/Postal code: 57176 /57980
- ^{1} French Land Register data, which excludes lakes, ponds, glaciers > 1 km^{2} (0.386 sq mi or 247 acres) and river estuaries.

Diebling (French pronunciation: [diblɛ̃]; Lorraine Franconian: Diwlinge/Dieblinge; German: Dieblingen) is a commune in the Moselle department in Grand Est in north-eastern France.

== Population development ==
Historical population
Year	Pop.	±% p.a.
1968	1,265	—
1975	1,489	+2.36%
1982	1,583	+0.88%
1990	1,709	+0.96%
1999	1,629	−0.53%
2007	1,620	−0.07%
2012	1,667	+0.57%
2017	1,643	−0.29%
2023	1,658	+0.15%
Source: INSEE

== See also ==
- Communes of the Moselle department
