= Folkling =

- Commune
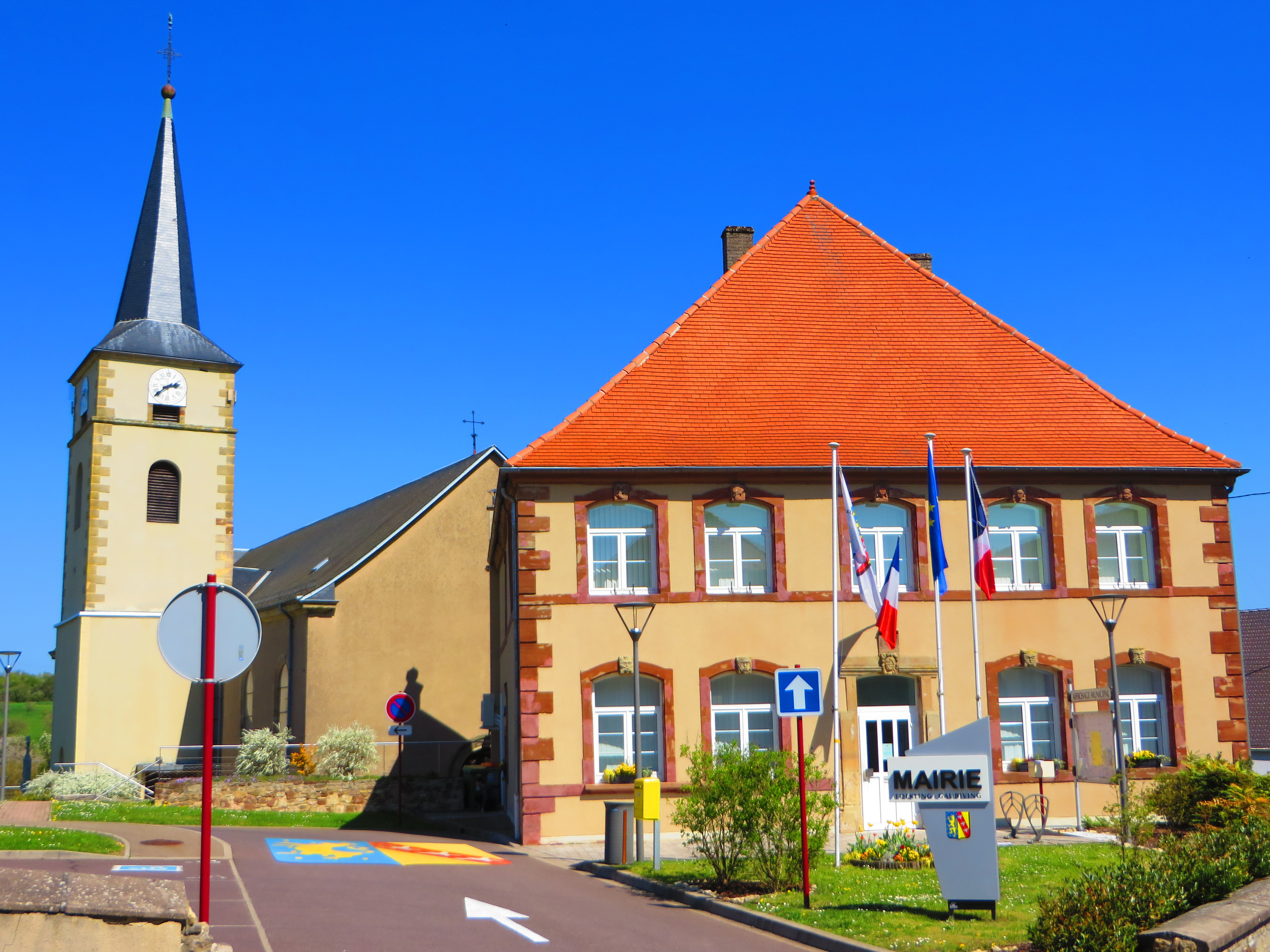
- The church and town hall in Folkling

- Coat of arms
- Location of Folkling
- Location within France Location within Grand Est
- Coordinates: 49°08′52″N 6°53′43″E
- Country: France
- Region: Grand Est
- Department: Moselle
- Arrondissement: Forbach-Boulay-Moselle
- Canton: Stiring-Wendel
- Intercommunality: CA Forbach Porte de France

Government
  - Mayor (2020–2026): Bernard De Feyter
- Area^{1}: 11.87 km^{2} (4.58 sq mi)
- Elevation: 280 m (920 ft)
- Highest elevation: 373 m (1,224 ft)
- Lowest elevation: 233 m (764 ft)
- Population (2023): 1,411
  - Density: 118.9/km^{2} (307.9/sq mi)
- Time zone: UTC+01:00 (CET)
  - Summer (DST): UTC+02:00 (CEST)
- INSEE/Postal code: 57222 /57600
- ^{1} French Land Register data, which excludes lakes, ponds, glaciers > 1 km^{2} (0.386 sq mi or 247 acres) and river estuaries.

Folkling (French pronunciation: [fɔlklɛ̃]; German: Folklingen; Lorraine Franconian: Folklinge) is a commune in the Moselle department in Grand Est in north-eastern France.

Localities of the commune: Gaubiving, Remsing.

== See also ==
- Communes of the Moselle department
