= Kerbach =

- Commune
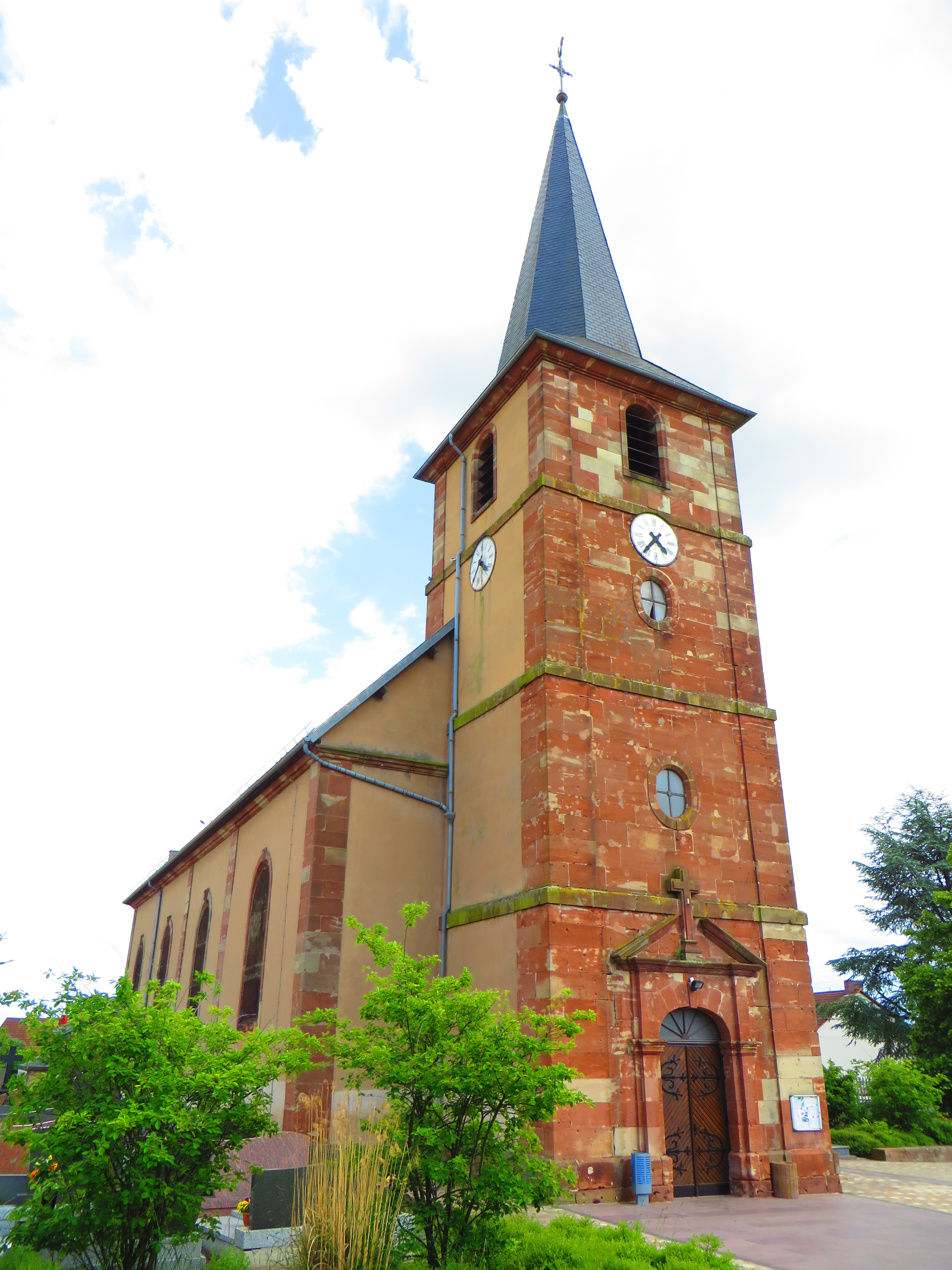
- The church in Kerbach

- Coat of arms
- Location of Kerbach
- Location within France Location within Grand Est
- Coordinates: 49°10′02″N 6°57′57″E
- Country: France
- Region: Grand Est
- Department: Moselle
- Arrondissement: Forbach-Boulay-Moselle
- Canton: Stiring-Wendel
- Intercommunality: CA Forbach Porte de France

Government
  - Mayor (2020–2026): Daniel Fritz
- Area^{1}: 4.45 km^{2} (1.72 sq mi)
- Elevation: 340 m (1,120 ft)
- Highest elevation: 360 m (1,180 ft)
- Lowest elevation: 231 m (758 ft)
- Population (2023): 1,224
  - Density: 275/km^{2} (712/sq mi)
- Time zone: UTC+01:00 (CET)
  - Summer (DST): UTC+02:00 (CEST)
- INSEE/Postal code: 57360 /57460
- ^{1} French Land Register data, which excludes lakes, ponds, glaciers > 1 km^{2} (0.386 sq mi or 247 acres) and river estuaries.

Kerbach (French pronunciation: [kɛʁbak]) is a commune in the Moselle department in Grand Est in north-eastern France.

== Population ==
Historical population
Year	Pop.	±% p.a.
1968	557	—
1975	597	+1.00%
1982	842	+5.03%
1990	911	+0.99%
1999	977	+0.78%
2007	1,155	+2.11%
2012	1,199	+0.75%
2017	1,189	−0.17%
2023	1,224	+0.48%
Source: INSEE

== See also ==
- Communes of the Moselle department
