= Spicheren =

- Commune
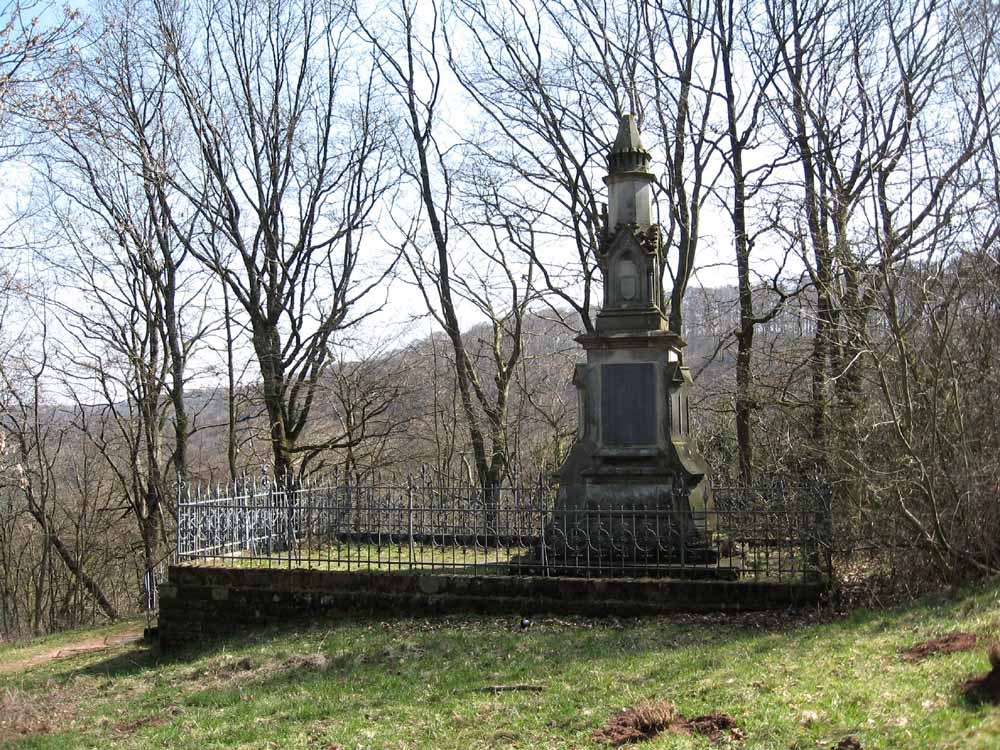
- A war memorial in Spicheren

- Coat of arms
- Location of Spicheren
- Location within France Location within Grand Est
- Coordinates: 49°11′33″N 6°58′09″E
- Country: France
- Region: Grand Est
- Department: Moselle
- Arrondissement: Forbach-Boulay-Moselle
- Canton: Stiring-Wendel
- Intercommunality: CA Forbach Porte de France

Government
  - Mayor (2020–2026): Claude Klein
- Area^{1}: 8.11 km^{2} (3.13 sq mi)
- Elevation: 350 m (1,150 ft)
- Highest elevation: 357 m (1,171 ft)
- Lowest elevation: 220 m (720 ft)
- Population (2023): 3,143
  - Density: 388/km^{2} (1,000/sq mi)
- Time zone: UTC+01:00 (CET)
  - Summer (DST): UTC+02:00 (CEST)
- INSEE/Postal code: 57659 /57350
- ^{1} French Land Register data, which excludes lakes, ponds, glaciers > 1 km^{2} (0.386 sq mi or 247 acres) and river estuaries.

Spicheren (French pronunciation: [spiʃʁən]; German: Spichern) is a commune in the Moselle department in Grand Est in north-eastern France. It is located on the German border, lying next to the city of Saarbrücken. It was also where the first shots of the Franco-Prussian war were fired during the Battle of Spicheren.

== Population ==
Historical population
Year	Pop.	±% p.a.
1968	2,355	—
1975	2,414	+0.35%
1982	2,593	+1.03%
1990	3,008	+1.87%
1999	3,287	+0.99%
2007	3,249	−0.15%
2012	3,198	−0.32%
2017	3,224	+0.16%
2023	3,143	−0.42%
Source: INSEE

== See also ==
- Communes of the Moselle department
- Battle of Spicheren
