= Cocheren =

- Commune
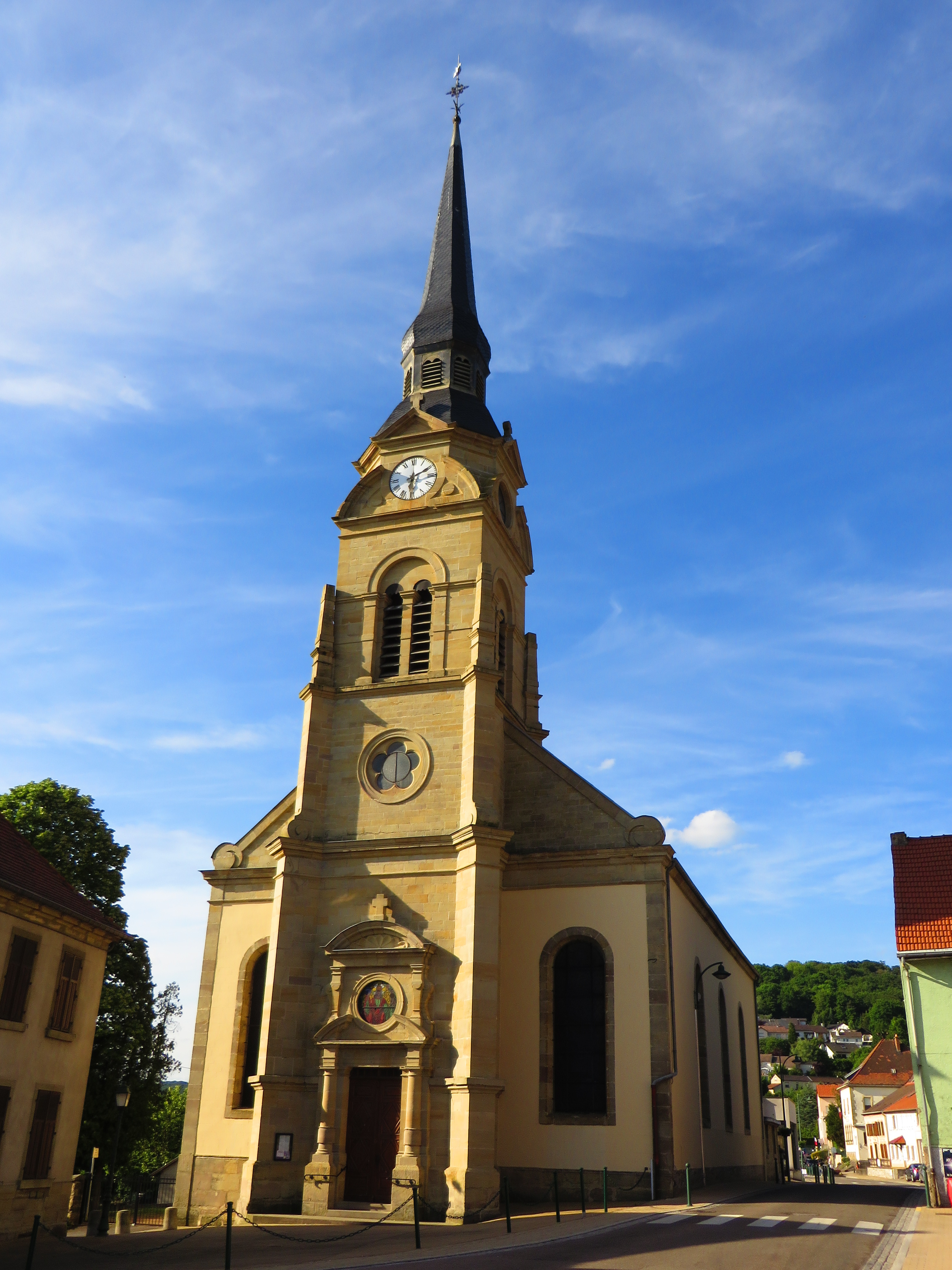
- The church of the Trinity in Cocheren

- Coat of arms
- Location of Cocheren
- Location within France Location within Grand Est
- Coordinates: 49°08′39″N 6°51′26″E
- Country: France
- Region: Grand Est
- Department: Moselle
- Arrondissement: Forbach-Boulay-Moselle
- Canton: Forbach
- Intercommunality: CA Forbach Porte de France

Government
  - Mayor (2020–2026): Jean-Bernard Martin
- Area^{1}: 5.62 km^{2} (2.17 sq mi)
- Elevation: 320 m (1,050 ft)
- Highest elevation: 340 m (1,120 ft)
- Lowest elevation: 200 m (660 ft)
- Population (2023): 3,358
  - Density: 598/km^{2} (1,550/sq mi)
- Time zone: UTC+01:00 (CET)
  - Summer (DST): UTC+02:00 (CEST)
- INSEE/Postal code: 57144 /57800
- ^{1} French Land Register data, which excludes lakes, ponds, glaciers > 1 km^{2} (0.386 sq mi or 247 acres) and river estuaries.

Cocheren (French pronunciation: [kɔʃʁən]; German: Kochern) is a commune in the Moselle department in Grand Est in north-eastern France.

Localities of the commune: Ditschviller (German: Ditschweiler), Herapel.

== Population ==
Historical population
Year	Pop.	±% p.a.
1968	4,227	—
1975	3,731	−1.77%
1982	3,544	−0.73%
1990	3,425	−0.43%
1999	3,293	−0.44%
2007	3,395	+0.38%
2012	3,515	+0.70%
2017	3,478	−0.21%
2023	3,358	−0.58%
Source: INSEE

== See also ==
- Communes of the Moselle department
