= Forbach =

- Subprefecture and commune
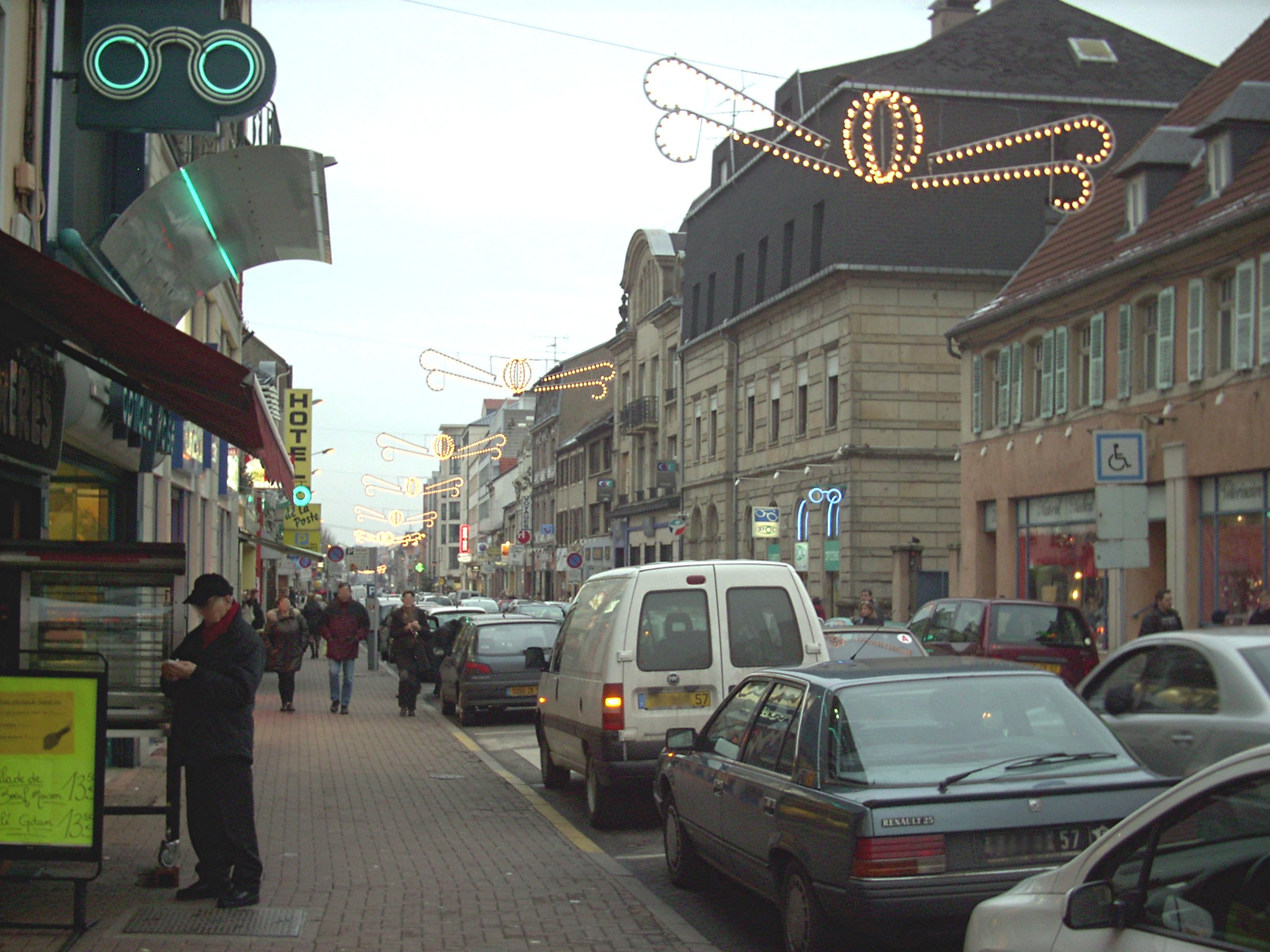
- Town centre

- Coat of arms
- Location of Forbach
- Location within France Location within Grand Est
- Coordinates: 49°11′N 6°54′E
- Country: France
- Region: Grand Est
- Department: Moselle
- Arrondissement: Forbach-Boulay-Moselle
- Canton: Forbach
- Intercommunality: CA Forbach Porte de France

Government
  - Mayor (2020–2026): Alexander Cassaro
- Area^{1}: 16.32 km^{2} (6.30 sq mi)
- Elevation: 222 m (728 ft)
- Highest elevation: 388 m (1,273 ft)
- Lowest elevation: 192 m (630 ft)
- Population (2023): 20,493
  - Density: 1,256/km^{2} (3,252/sq mi)
- Time zone: UTC+01:00 (CET)
  - Summer (DST): UTC+02:00 (CEST)
- INSEE/Postal code: 57227 /57600
- ^{1} French Land Register data, which excludes lakes, ponds, glaciers > 1 km^{2} (0.386 sq mi or 247 acres) and river estuaries.

Forbach (/fɔːrˈbɑːk/ for-BAHK, French: [fɔʁbak], German: [ˈfɔʁbax]; Alemannic German: Fuerboch) is a commune in the French department of Moselle, northeastern French region of Grand Est.

It is located on the German border approximately 15 minutes from the center of Saarbrücken, Germany, with which it constitutes a cross-border conurbation, and is part of the Saar-Moselle Eurodistrict. With a population of about 20,000, it is the largest town in the eastern Moselle area.

== History ==
Forbach is located in an area inhabited for a long time. Remains of the Celtic and especially Roman eras have been found in Forbach.

=== Medieval era ===
A castle was built on the Schlossberg hill at the end of the 12th century. It was gradually enlarged and, around 1550, connected to the city by an enclosure wall. Between the 10th century and 1793, many seigneurs owned the seigneury of Forbach. Johann Fischart, a prolific satirical writer, worked as a bailiff at Forbach Castle where he stayed from 1583 to 1590.

The chapel of the Holy Cross of Forbach was mentioned in a letter from 1338 by the Bishop of Metz, Adhémar of Monteil, under the name of capella sancta crucis juxta Forbachum. It was probably built in the 13th century. It was extensively renovated in the 14th and 15th centuries. It was probably the property of the Hombourg-Haut congregations since 1257. It was badly damaged during the Thirty Years' War.

=== War of 1870, German annexation and the First World War ===
Until the Franco-Prussian War, Forbach was in the French orbit. However, after the nearby Battle of Spicheren in August 1870, the town was occupied by German troops, and at the conclusion of the war annexed to Germany, forming part of the imperial province of Alsace–Lorraine. The region was returned to France in 1918.

=== Post-Second World War ===
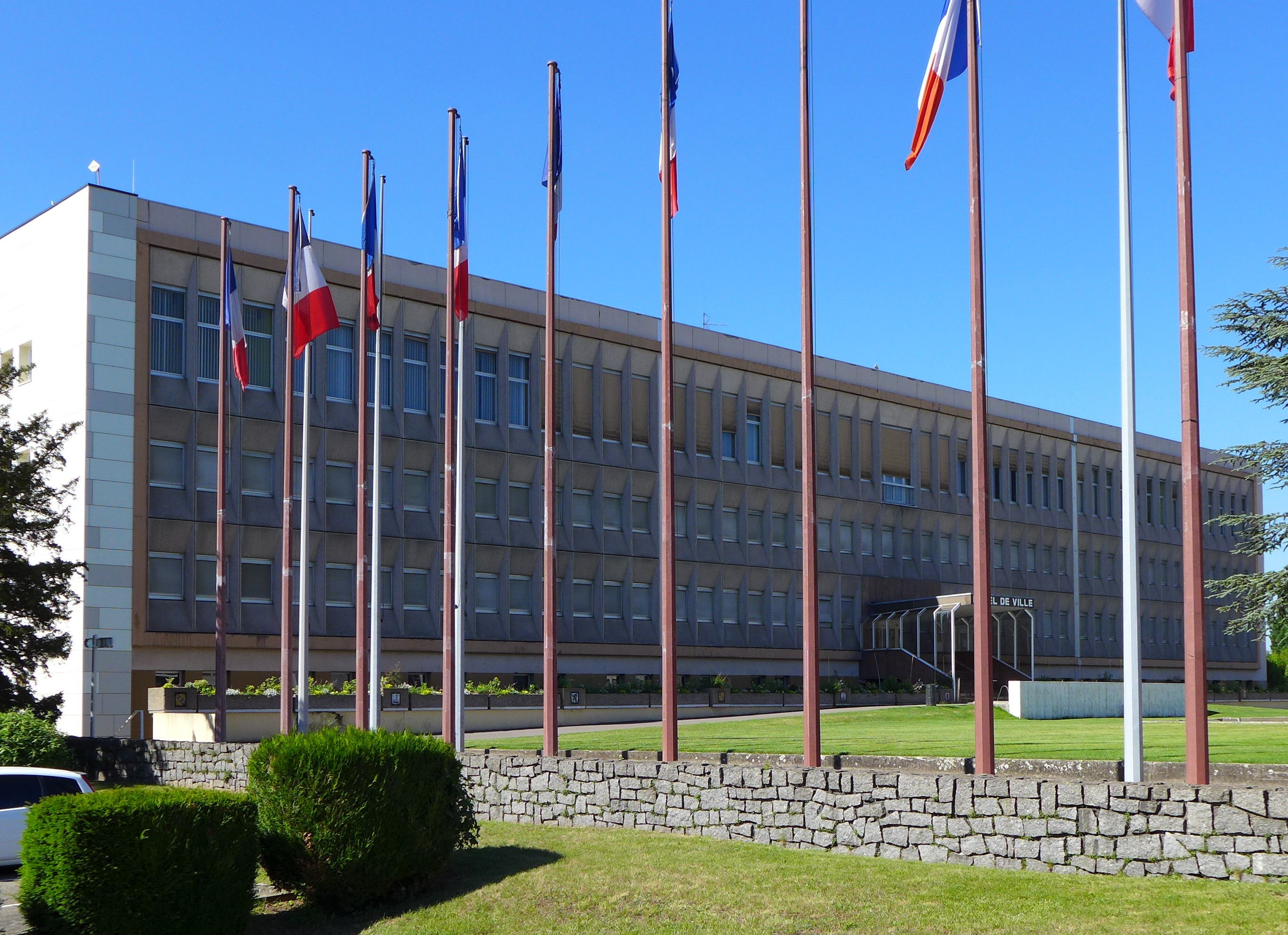
The Hôtel de Ville

The Hôtel de Ville was completed in 1974.

Before the Schengen Treaty was signed in 1985, Forbach was a major border crossing at which customs procedures were carried out, both for road and for rail transport and travel. Since 2007, the TGV and ICE high speed trains connecting Paris and Frankfurt have stopped at the station in Forbach, and passengers can now travel to Paris Gare de l'Est in 1 hour and 45 minutes and to the German financial center and airport in the Frankfurt and Rhine-Main metropolis in 2 hours.

Its location in the Saar-Warndt coal mining basin, which extends into eastern Moselle, made Forbach an important mining town, with offices of the Houillères du Bassin de Lorraine (Lorraine coal mining board), a section of the French Coal Board. When the mining operations were permanently shut down in 2004, Forbach turned to activities in the tourism, service, energy and other industries to rebuild the local economy. The "Musée des Mineurs - Wendel" in the neighboring village of Petite-Rosselle is a coal mining museum which preserves the industrial and cultural heritage from the coal mining era in the Forbach region. It was awarded the "Musées de France" quality label in 2002.

== Population ==
Historical population

Year	Pop.	±% p.a.
1793	1,539	—
1800	1,769	+2.01%
1806	1,881	+1.03%
1821	3,110	+3.41%
1836	4,428	+2.38%
1841	4,288	−0.64%
1861	4,860	+0.63%
1866	5,691	+3.21%
1871	5,411	−1.00%
1875	6,173	+3.35%
1880	7,114	+2.88%
1885	7,839	+1.96%
1890	9,575	+4.08%
1895	7,867	−3.85%
1900	8,208	+0.85%
1905	8,628	+1.00%
1910	9,704	+2.38%

Year	Pop.	±% p.a.
1921	10,514	+0.73%
1926	11,569	+1.93%
1931	11,491	−0.14%
1936	12,167	+1.15%
1946	9,599	−2.34%
1954	21,591	+10.66%
1962	21,704	+0.07%
1968	23,120	+1.06%
1975	25,244	+1.26%
1982	27,187	+1.06%
1990	27,076	−0.05%
1999	22,807	−1.89%
2007	21,801	−0.56%
2012	21,475	−0.30%
2017	21,552	+0.07%
2023	20,493	−0.84%

Source: EHESS and INSEE (1968–2023)

== Notable people from Forbach ==
- Nicolas Appert (1749–1841), inventor, notably of the canning technique
- Claire Burger (born 1978), journalist, screenwriter and film director. Her 2008 short film, Forbach, was awarded by the Cinéfoundation in 2008 and she received the "Ensemble Prize" along with Marie Amachoukeli and Samuel Theis in the category "A Certain Regard" (Un Certain Regard) for their first feature film, Party Girl, at the 2014 Cannes Film Festival.
- Jean-Luc Cairon (born 1962), gymnast and coach
- Helmut Fritz (born 1975), singer
- Jean-Nicolas Houchard (1740–1793), French General, whose name appears on the Arc de Triomphe in Paris
- Sophie Huber (born 1985), freestyle swimmer
- Eugene Jolas (1894–1952), journalist, poet and translator, best known for founding the modernist Parisian journal transition (which published, notably, James Joyce's Finnegans Wake).
- Patricia Kaas (born 1966), singer from Stiring-Wendel (near Forbach)
- Christian von Zweibrücken (1782–1859), Bavarian general
- Sam Hocevar (born 1978), Debian project leader from 17 April 2007 to 16 April 2008
- Loris Frasca Olympic Gymnast

== Climate ==
Climate data for Forbach (Seingbouse) (2003–2020 normals, extremes 2003–present)
Month	Jan	Feb	Mar	Apr	May	Jun	Jul	Aug	Sep	Oct	Nov	Dec	Year
Record high °C (°F)	13.9 (57.0)	21.4 (70.5)	23.9 (75.0)	26.8 (80.2)	30.7 (87.3)	35.2 (95.4)	37.9 (100.2)	37.8 (100.0)	32.6 (90.7)	27.0 (80.6)	21.0 (69.8)	14.9 (58.8)	37.9 (100.2)
Mean daily maximum °C (°F)	4.0 (39.2)	5.4 (41.7)	10.0 (50.0)	15.5 (59.9)	18.6 (65.5)	22.5 (72.5)	24.7 (76.5)	24.0 (75.2)	20.0 (68.0)	14.4 (57.9)	8.5 (47.3)	4.8 (40.6)	14.4 (57.9)
Daily mean °C (°F)	1.8 (35.2)	2.6 (36.7)	6.1 (43.0)	10.7 (51.3)	13.8 (56.8)	17.6 (63.7)	19.7 (67.5)	19.1 (66.4)	15.4 (59.7)	10.9 (51.6)	6.0 (42.8)	2.7 (36.9)	10.5 (50.9)
Mean daily minimum °C (°F)	−0.4 (31.3)	−0.2 (31.6)	2.2 (36.0)	5.9 (42.6)	9.1 (48.4)	12.6 (54.7)	14.6 (58.3)	14.2 (57.6)	10.8 (51.4)	7.4 (45.3)	3.6 (38.5)	0.5 (32.9)	6.7 (44.1)
Record low °C (°F)	−12.3 (9.9)	−15.3 (4.5)	−12.4 (9.7)	−3.4 (25.9)	−0.3 (31.5)	3.9 (39.0)	7.4 (45.3)	5.8 (42.4)	3.1 (37.6)	−5.2 (22.6)	−5.8 (21.6)	−17.0 (1.4)	−17.0 (1.4)
Average precipitation mm (inches)	63.0 (2.48)	57.7 (2.27)	55.3 (2.18)	39.8 (1.57)	68.9 (2.71)	60.3 (2.37)	54.7 (2.15)	68.4 (2.69)	54.8 (2.16)	61.4 (2.42)	66.0 (2.60)	81.1 (3.19)	731.4 (28.80)
Average precipitation days (≥ 1.0 mm)	12.4	9.5	9.7	7.5	10.0	9.1	8.6	9.9	7.3	9.7	10.6	12.7	116.9
Source: Meteociel

== See also ==
- Communes of the Moselle department

== Gallery ==
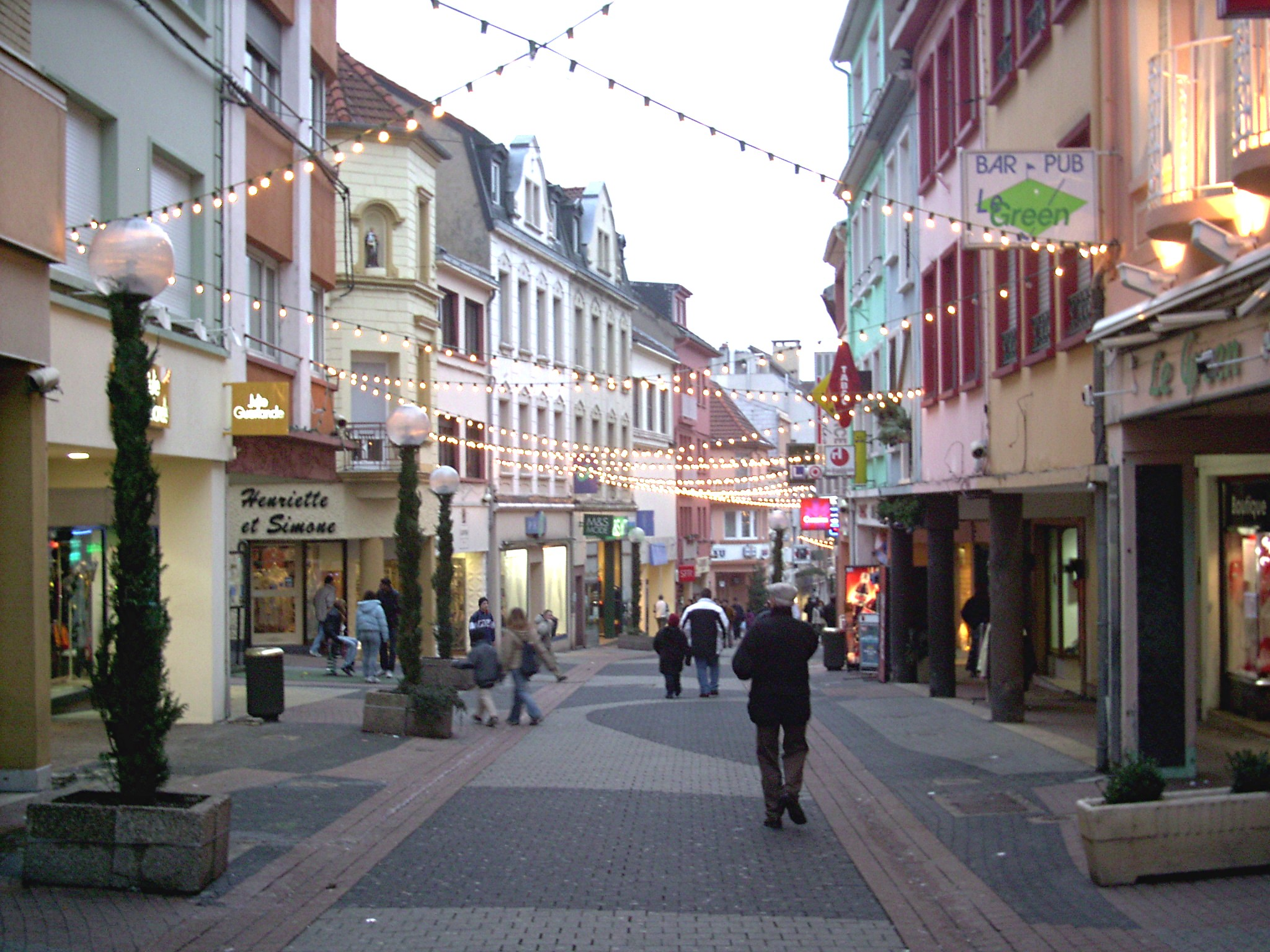
Town centre

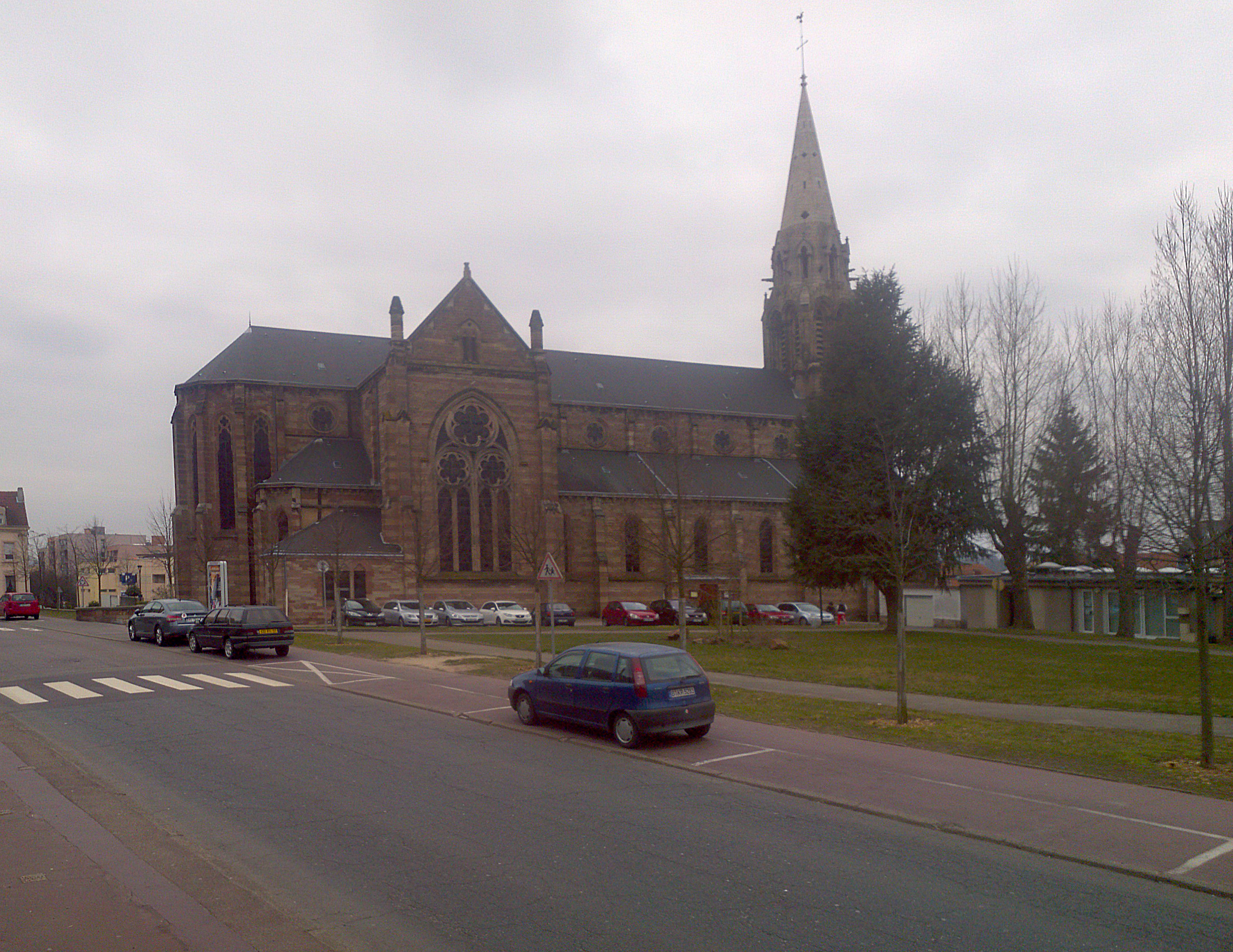
Catholic Church

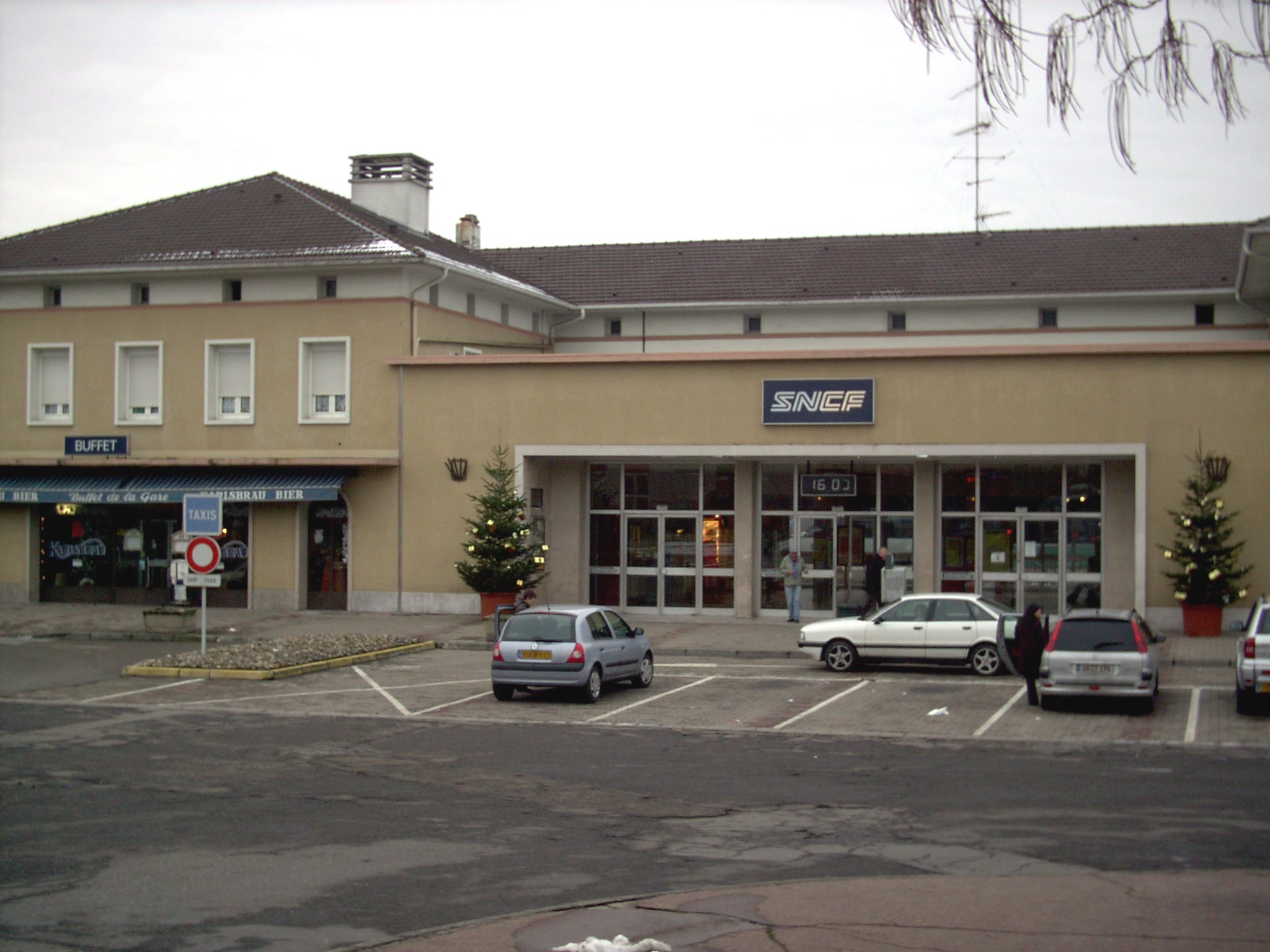
Train station

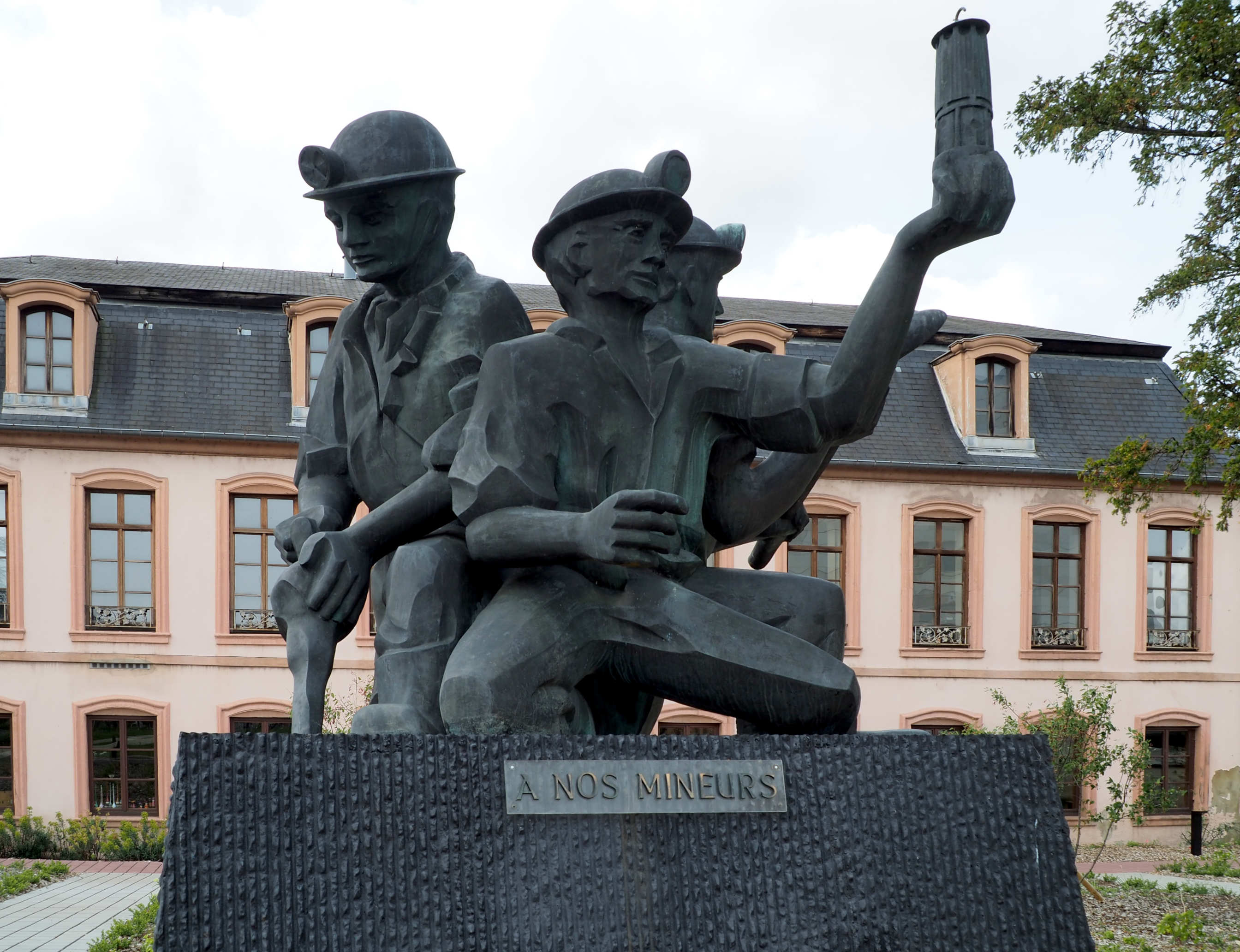
Monument to miners, Barrabino palace
