= Linden, Hesse =

Linden
- Town
- Coat of arms

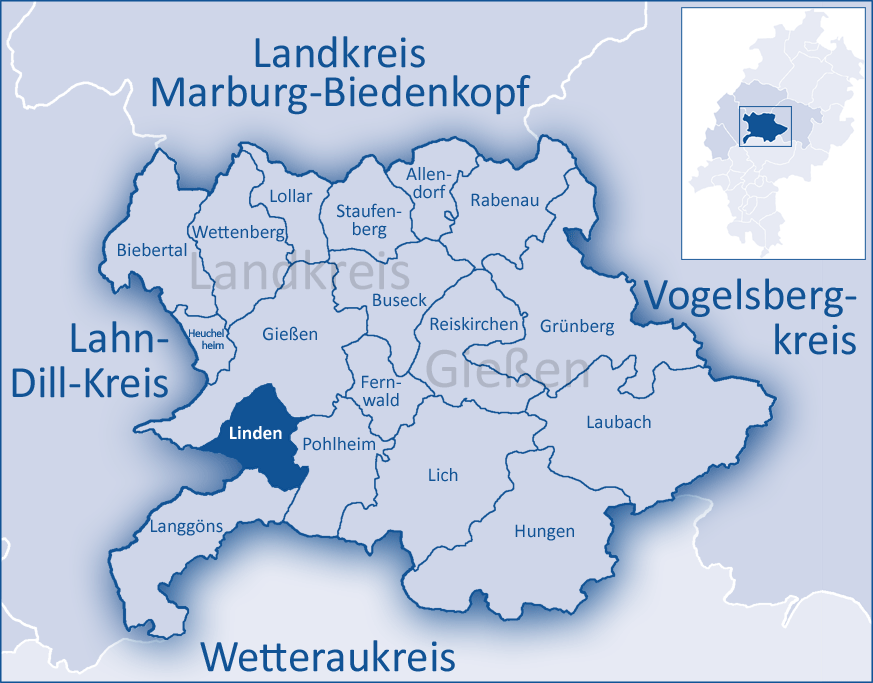
- Location of Linden within Gießen district
- Interactive map of Linden
- Location within Germany Location within Hesse
- Coordinates: 50°32′7″N 8°40′1″E
- Country: Germany
- State: Hesse
- Admin. region: Gießen
- District: Gießen
- Subdivisions: 2 boroughs

Government
  - Mayor (2023–29): Fabian Wedemann (Ind.)

Area
  - Total: 22.77 km^{2} (8.79 sq mi)
- Elevation: 188 m (617 ft)

Population (2025-12-31)
  - Total: 13,232
  - Density: 581.1/km^{2} (1,505/sq mi)
- Time zone: UTC+01:00 (CET)
  - Summer (DST): UTC+02:00 (CEST)
- Postal codes: 35440
- Dialling codes: 06403
- Vehicle registration: GI
- Website: www.linden.de

Linden (German pronunciation: [ˈlɪndn̩]) is a small town in the Gießen district, central Hesse, Germany. It is situated approximately 6 km south of Gießen.

The Dießenbach, a small brook, flows into the Kleebach in Linden.

== Geography ==
=== Geographical location ===
To the north, Linden borders the district seat of Gießen, to the east the town of Pohlheim, to the south the municipality of Langgöns, and to the west the municipality of Hüttenberg (Lahn-Dill-Kreis).

=== Town divisions ===
The town consists of the boroughs of Großen-Linden and Leihgestern. Großen-Linden includes the settlements of Forst, Oberhof, Am Bergwerkswald, and the Aussiedlerhof (isolated farmstead) Sonnenhof; Leihgestern includes Mühlberg, Gut Neuhof, as well as the Aussiedlerhöfe Hof Konrad, Birkenhof, Berghof, and Ludwigshof.

== History ==
=== Großen-Linden ===
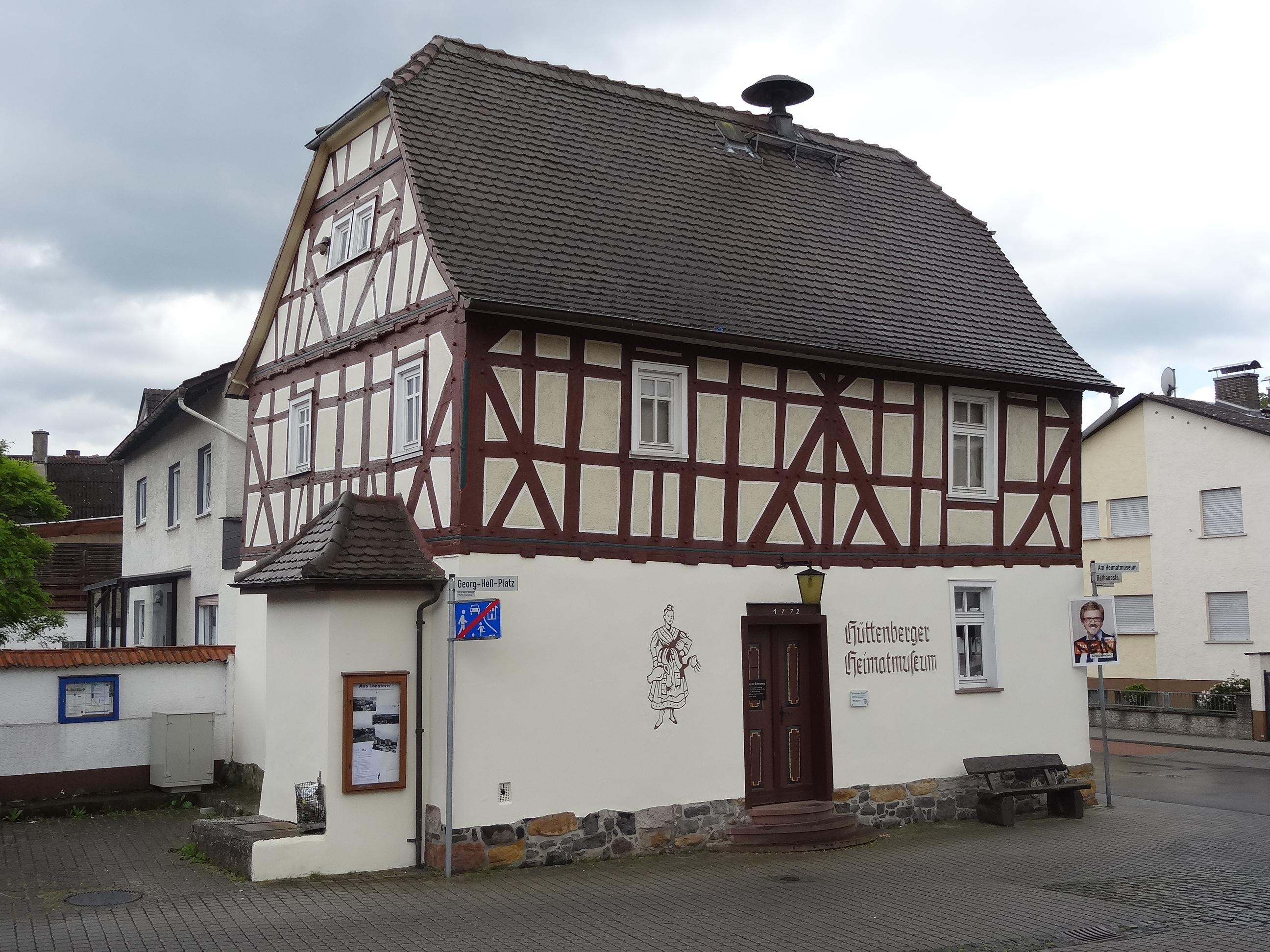
Hüttenberg local history museum in the old village center of Leihgestern

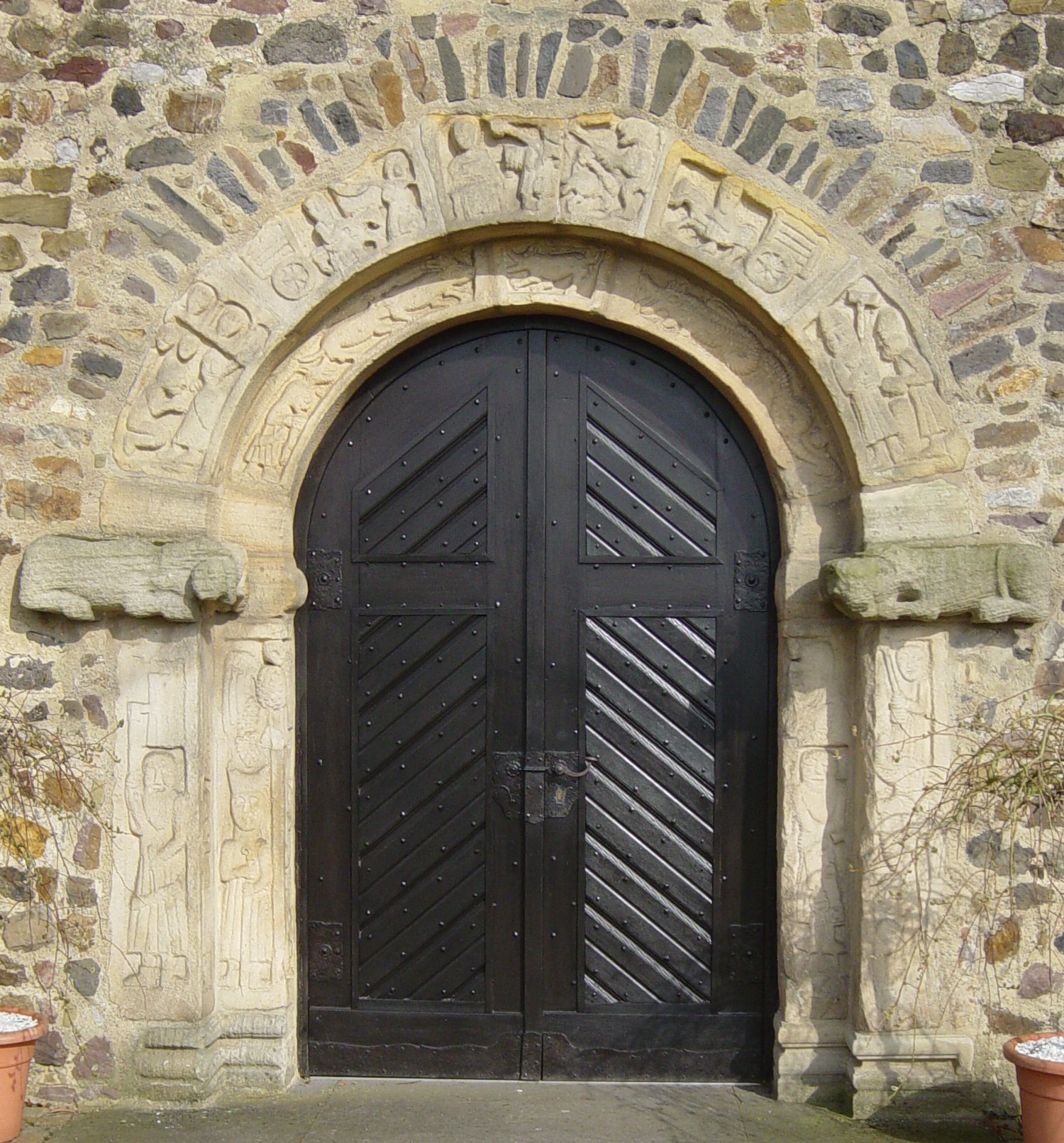
St. Peter's Church (Großen-Linden), Romanesque west portal, c. 1230

The first written mention comes from the Lorsch Codex. According to it, the Villa Lindun was donated to the Lorsch Abbey on February 27, 790. Through another donation to the Lorsch Abbey on June 11, 805, the name Letkestre (Leihgestern) was mentioned for the first time. In the early Middle Ages, Linden was part of the Niederlahngau and was owned by various regional counts before the town finally came into the possession of the Counts of Gleiberg in the 10th century during the time of Otto the Great. In 1265, Linden passed to the Landgraviate of Hesse when Landgrave Henry I acquired parts of the former Countship of Gleiberg along with Gießen from the Counts Palatine of Tübingen. In 1347, a document added the prefix Großen- to the name Linden for the first time to distinguish the town from the neighboring village of Lützellinden (now a district of Gießen).

From 1396 to 1585, the judicial district of Hüttenberg, as well as the Common Land on the Lahn, was a condominium of the Landgraves of Hesse and the Counts of the Nassau. During this time, Großen-Linden was the main seat of a judicial district, and there were two Schultheiß (mayors/magistrates) in Großen-Linden. Due to disagreements, the judicial district was divided between the two counts' houses in 1585. The Reformation was driven by the Landgraves of Hesse in their territories starting in 1527; the first Protestant pastor in Großen-Linden is documented in 1546.

Großen-Linden received town rights either on February 19, 1605, from Louis IV of Hesse-Marburg or earlier between 1561 and 1577. It is historically documented that, unlike the other villages of the Hüttenberg, the citizens of Großen-Linden no longer had to pay taxes in the year 1577.

During the Thirty Years' War, the settlement, which was surrounded by a wall and a moat, was heavily damaged, like all surrounding villages. At the end of the war, about 40 out of 130 houses in the town were uninhabited, and about 400 residents were counted.

In the 18th century, the farming village gradually began to expand beyond its medieval boundaries, and more crafts and commercial trades settled there. In 1712, the town received market rights; in 1716, the first of several local inns was documented; there were soon several dye works, a lime kiln, and, towards the end of the 18th century, also stocking weavers, wig makers, and trouser tailors.

After the Napoleonic Wars around 1800 initially hindered the further development of the town with extensive troop quartering, a sweeping development occurred in the middle of the 19th century as a result of the onset of industrialization and the construction of the Main-Weser Railway.

The Statistical-Topographical-Historical Description of the Grand Duchy of Hesse reports the following about Großenlinden in 1830:

Großenlinden (L. Bez. Giessen) town; lies 2 hours from Giessen, on the Kleebach, as well as on the highway leading from Giessen to Frankfurt, and is still partially surrounded by a moat. The place has 144 houses and 900 inhabitants, who are Protestant except for 4 Catholics and 40 Jews, as well as 1 church, 1 schoolhouse, 1 town hall, and 3 flour mills, with which 1 oil mill is connected. Among the trades are several dye works, which give linen its most durable blue color and were already famous at the end of the last century. In the district, there is a very excellent peat. – The name of the Linder Mark dates back to the times of Charlemagne, and sometimes instead of the Mark, the village of Linden is mentioned, which is indisputably the subsequent Großenlinden. The place is said to have been provided with fortifications and a citadel, and these, in 1248, were destroyed along with the castle houses by Landgravine Sophie when the estate at Großenlinden refused to pay homage to her son, Heinrich the Child. This news might refer to Hohenlinden between Biedenkopf and Wetter. Also, the legend has persisted until now that the Templars had a seat here and lived in the town hall. In the year 1396, Landgrave Hermann exchanged half of the place with his brother-in-law, Count Philipp of Nassau, for half of the Kirchberg court. This community lasted until 1585, when a division was made, and Hesse received, among other things, the market town of Großenlinden. Until the 16th century, the chapels in Leihgestern, Kleinlinden, Dornholzhausen, Hochelheim, Hörnsheim, and Allendorf belonged to Großenlinden.

—

The construction of the railway brought many workers to Großen-Linden around 1848, and further jobs were offered by the manganese mine established in 1841, a lime works, and several cigar factories. Between 1817 and 1900, the population doubled to over 1,700 inhabitants, the old thatched houses were replaced with tile roofs, and the town grew in all directions. In the late 19th century, the railway line was ultimately the defining economic factor of the region. While the villages located away from the railway suffered a loss of population due to migration and emigration, Großen-Linden and also Leihgestern profited from the influx from the surrounding area.

After the Second World War, population growth continued with the influx of around 1,400 refugees and displaced persons, as a result of which the town had almost 4,000 inhabitants in 1949. Due to the predominantly Catholic refugees, a Catholic community of nearly 1,000 people was formed in what had been an almost purely Protestant town until World War II. The permanent housing of the refugees required the designation of new development areas.

=== Leihgestern ===
For the history of the borough of Leihgestern, see Leihgestern.

=== Linden ===
In the course of the territorial reform in Hesse, the town of Großen-Linden and the municipality of Leihgestern were merged on January 1, 1977, by the Law on the reorganization of the Dillkreis, the districts of Gießen and Wetzlar, and the city of Gießen to form the new town of Linden. Local districts (Ortsbezirke) were not formed.

=== Overview of Administrative History ===
The following list shows the states and administrative units (Note: Until the separation of the judiciary from the administration, the historic administrative districts (Ämter) and early courts acted as both courts and administrative bodies.) to which Großen-Linden belonged:

- 790: Frankish Empire, Lahngau
- 1065: East Francia, County of Count Werner, then the Counts of Gleiberg and the Counts Palatine of Tübingen
- 1264/65: Transition into the possession of the Landgraviate of Hesse
- Before 1567: Holy Roman Empire, Landgraviate of Hesse, Amt Gießen
- From 1567: Holy Roman Empire, Landgraviate of Hesse-Marburg, Amt Gießen
- 1604–1648: Holy Roman Empire, disputed between Landgraviate of Hesse-Darmstadt and Landgraviate of Hesse-Kassel (Hessian War)
- From 1604: Holy Roman Empire, Landgraviate of Hesse-Darmstadt, Principality of Upper Hesse, Oberamt Gießen (from 1789)
- From 1806: Grand Duchy of Hesse, Principality of Upper Hesse, Stadtamt Gießen
- From 1815: Grand Duchy of Hesse, Province of Upper Hesse, Stadtamt Gießen
- From 1821: Grand Duchy of Hesse, Province of Upper Hesse, Landratsbezirk Gießen (Note: Separation between justice (Landgericht Gießen) and administration.)
- From 1832: Grand Duchy of Hesse, Province of Upper Hesse, Kreis Gießen (August to November Kreis Grünberg)
- From 1848: Grand Duchy of Hesse, Regierungsbezirk Gießen
- From 1852: Grand Duchy of Hesse, Province of Upper Hesse, Kreis Gießen
- From 1867: North German Confederation, Grand Duchy of Hesse, Province of Upper Hesse, Kreis Gießen
- From 1871: German Empire, Grand Duchy of Hesse, Province of Upper Hesse, Kreis Gießen
- From 1918: German Empire, People's State of Hesse, Province of Upper Hesse, Kreis Gießen
- From 1938: German Empire, Grand Duchy of Hesse, Province of Upper Hesse, Landkreis Gießen (Note: In the course of the territorial reform of 1938, the Province of Upper Hesse was dissolved.)
- From 1945: American zone of occupation, (Note: As a result of World War II.) Greater Hesse, Regierungsbezirk Darmstadt, Landkreis Gießen
- From 1946: American zone of occupation, Hesse, Regierungsbezirk Darmstadt, Landkreis Gießen
- From 1949: Federal Republic of Germany, Hesse, Regierungsbezirk Darmstadt, Landkreis Gießen
- From 1977: Federal Republic of Germany, Hesse, Regierungsbezirk Darmstadt, Lahn-Dill-Kreis, Town of Linden
- From 1979: Federal Republic of Germany, Hesse, Regierungsbezirk Darmstadt, Landkreis Gießen, Town of Linden
- From 1981: Federal Republic of Germany, Hesse, Regierungsbezirk Gießen, Landkreis Gießen, Town of Linden

== Population ==
=== Demographic structure 2011 ===
According to the 2011 census, 12,063 inhabitants lived in Linden on the reference date of May 9, 2011. Among them were 805 (6.7%) foreigners, of whom 268 came from the EU, 321 from other European countries, and 216 from other states. Of the German residents, 18.4% had a migration background. The inhabitants lived in 5,691 households. Of these, 2,211 were single households, 1,413 were couples without children, and 1,486 were couples with children, as well as 433 single parents and 148 communal households.

=== Population growth ===
The population figures of Großen-Linden and, from 1977 onwards, the town of Linden:

| • 1502: | 52 men |
| • 1577: | 114 householders |
| • 1648: | 77 men |
| • 1669: | 434 souls |
| • 1742: | 4 clerics/officials, 110 subjects, 31 young men, 12 residents/Jews |
| • 1791: | 614 inhabitants |
| • 1800: | 662 inhabitants |
| • 1806: | 716 inhabitants, 136 houses |
| • 1829: | 900 inhabitants, 144 houses |
| • 1867: | 1,195 inhabitants, 187 houses |

=== Historical religious affiliation ===
| • 1830: | 856 Protestant, 4 Roman Catholic inhabitants, 40 Jews |
| • 1961: | 3,191 Protestant, 832 Roman Catholic inhabitants |
| • 2011: | 5,960 Protestant (= 49.6%), 1,980 Catholic (= 16.5%), 170 free church members (= 1.5%), 750 Orthodox (= 6.3%), 330 other faiths (= 2.7%), 2,820 others (= 23.5%) inhabitants |

=== Historical employment ===
Source: Historical Local Lexicon

| • 1961: | Employed persons: 196 in agriculture and forestry, 935 in production industries, 434 in trade, transport, and communication, 345 in services and others. |

== Politics ==
=== Town council ===
The local election on March 14, 2021 yielded the following results, compared to previous local elections:

| Parties and voter communities | | 2021 | | 2016 | | 2011 | | 2006 | | 2001 | |
| Parties and voter communities | | % | Seats | % | Seats | % | Seats | % | Seats | % | Seats |
|---|---|---|---|---|---|---|---|---|---|---|---|
| CDU | Christian Democratic Union of Germany | 35.8 | 13 | 39.5 | 15 | 46.3 | 17 | 47.1 | 17 | 48.8 | 18 |
| Greens | Alliance 90/The Greens | 20.4 | 8 | 12.1 | 4 | 17.2 | 6 | 10.1 | 4 | 6.7 | 3 |
| SPD | Social Democratic Party of Germany | 18.9 | 7 | 26.0 | 10 | 26.2 | 10 | 31.8 | 12 | 33.5 | 12 |
| FW | Free Voters Linden | 13.3 | 5 | 16.1 | 6 | 8.5 | 3 | 8.1 | 3 | 10.0 | 4 |
| FDP | Free Democratic Party | 5.1 | 2 | 6.2 | 2 | 1.8 | 1 | 2.9 | 1 | 1.0 | 0 |
| Linke | The Left | 3.9 | 1 | — | — | — | — | — | — | — | — |
| AfD | Alternative for Germany | 2.6 | 1 | — | — | — | — | — | — | — | — |
| Total | | 100.0 | | 100.0 | | 100.0 | | 100.0 | | 100.0 | |
| Invalid votes in % | | 2.7 | — | 4.0 | — | 2.5 | — | 2.3 | — | 1.8 | — |
| Voter turnout in % | | 52.0 | | 52.3 | | 49.5 | | 47.1 | | 53.2 | |

=== Mayor ===
According to the Hessian municipal constitution, the mayor is elected for a six-year term, since 1993 via a direct election, and acts as the chairman of the Magistrat (executive body). In Linden, this consists of the mayor, an honorary First Councillor, and seven other council members. The independent Fabian Wedemann has been mayor since May 3, 2023. His predecessor Jörg König (CDU) was originally elected for the term 2018–24, but left office early on December 12, 2022, following a vote of no confidence by the town council, thereby pre-empting a public recall referendum. First Town Councillor Harald Liebermann (CDU) temporarily led the town administration until advanced elections were held. Fabian Wedemann received 57.6 percent of the votes in a runoff election on April 2, 2023, with a voter turnout of 43.1 percent.

Terms of office of the mayors of Linden since the 1977 merger

- Since 2023: Fabian Wedemann
- 2013–2022: Jörg König (CDU)
- 1977–2013: Ulrich Lenz (CDU)
- 1977: Reinhard Lang (SPD) (State Commissioner, January to May)

Mayors of the town of Großen-Linden

- 1967–1976: Reinhard Lang (SPD)
- 1954–1967: Albert Weigand (SPD)
- 1948–1954: Friedrich Matheis (SPD)
- 1945–1948: Philipp Stengel (SPD)
- 1943–1945: Albert Volk (acting)
- 1941–1943: 1st Deputy Karl Volk
- 1933–1940: Artur Michel
- 1919–1935: Ludwig Lang II.
- 1883–1917: Johannes Leun VIII.
- 1870–1883: Johannes Zörb
- 1842–1870: Johann Georg Menges II.
- 1821–1842: Johannes Leun

Mayors of the municipality of Leihgestern

- 1969–1976: Helmut Jung (SPD)
- 1956–1969: Karl Pfeffer (SPD)
- 1952–1956: Wilhelm Seipp (SPD)
- 1948–1952: Karl Textor (SPD)
- 1945–1948: Wilhelm Funk (SPD)
- 1938–1945: Wilhelm Damm
- 1934–1937: Hans Will
- 1904–1933: Johannes Heß (Grandson)
- 1871–1904: Johannes Heß (Son)
- 1842–1871: Johannes Heß (Father)

=== Coat of arms ===
The coat of arms is defined by two features that have borough-specific significance: the green linden tree stands for the borough of Großen-Linden, and the double-headed crane represents the borough of Leihgestern. Together, these emblems make up the current coat of arms of the town of Linden, which has been officially used since 1980.GießenerLand

The coat of arms of the town of Großen-Linden ("On a silver shield on green ground a green linden tree.") was approved on March 31, 1955, by the Hessian Minister of the Interior.

=== Youth Representation of the Town of Linden ===
The Youth Representation (JVL) in Linden consists of young people from the town who are delegated by various local clubs and organizations and is intended to represent all youth in Linden. If the youth representation passes a valid resolution, it can be presented to the Magistrat of the town of Linden to be voted on there again.

=== Town twinnings ===
- Sośnicowice, formerly Kieferstädtel (Silesian Voivodeship in Poland, since 1993)
- Loučná nad Desnou, formerly Wiesenberg-Winkelsdorf (Czech Republic, since 1995)
- Macheren (Moselle department in France, since 2001)
- Warabi (Japan, since 2002)
- Purgstall an der Erlauf (Lower Austria, since 2012)
- Machern (in Saxony, since 2009)

== Culture and Sights ==
=== Cultural Monuments in Linden ===
See Liste der Kulturdenkmäler in Linden (Hessen) (List of cultural monuments in Linden, Hesse)

=== Buildings ===
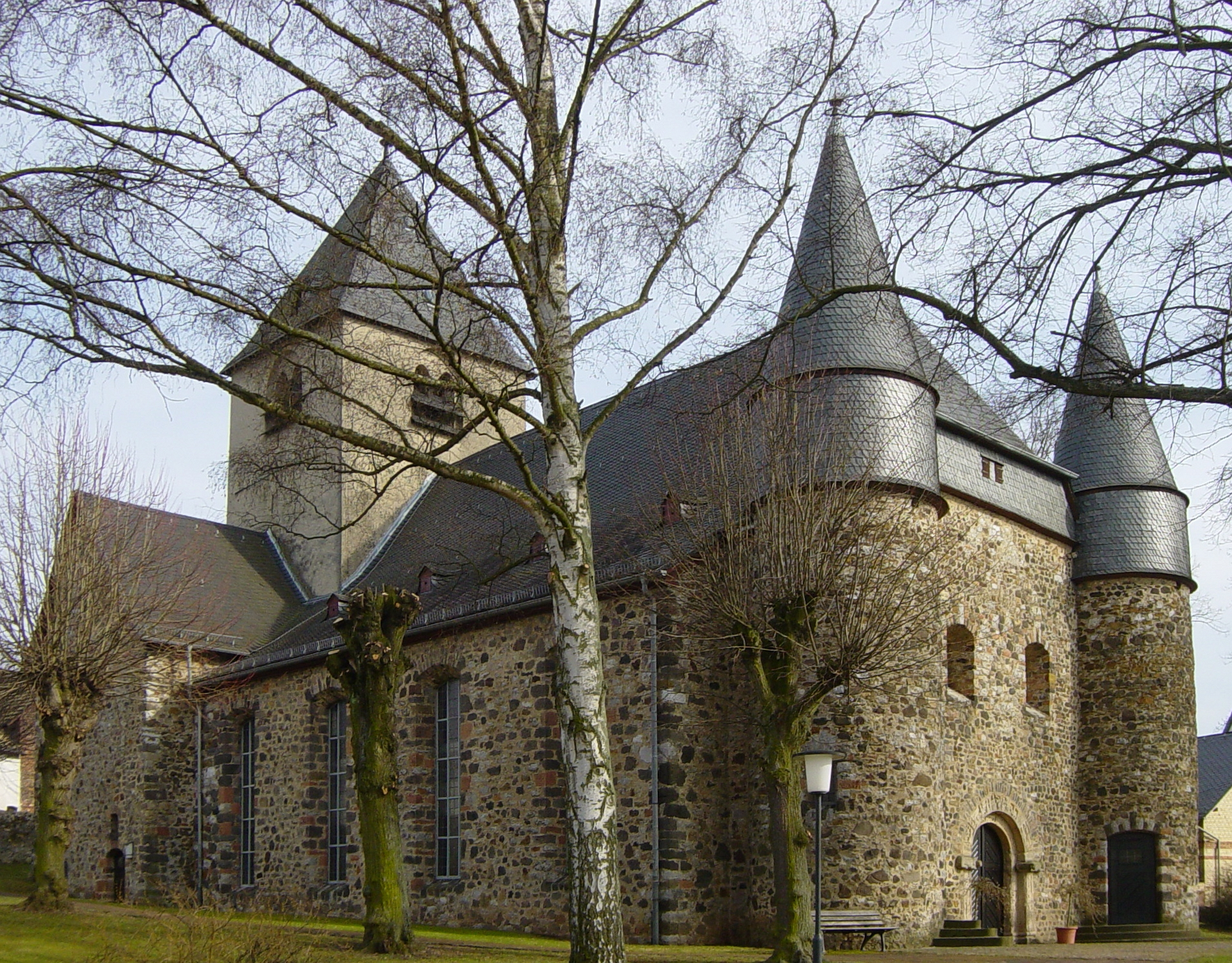
Romanesque church in Großen-Linden

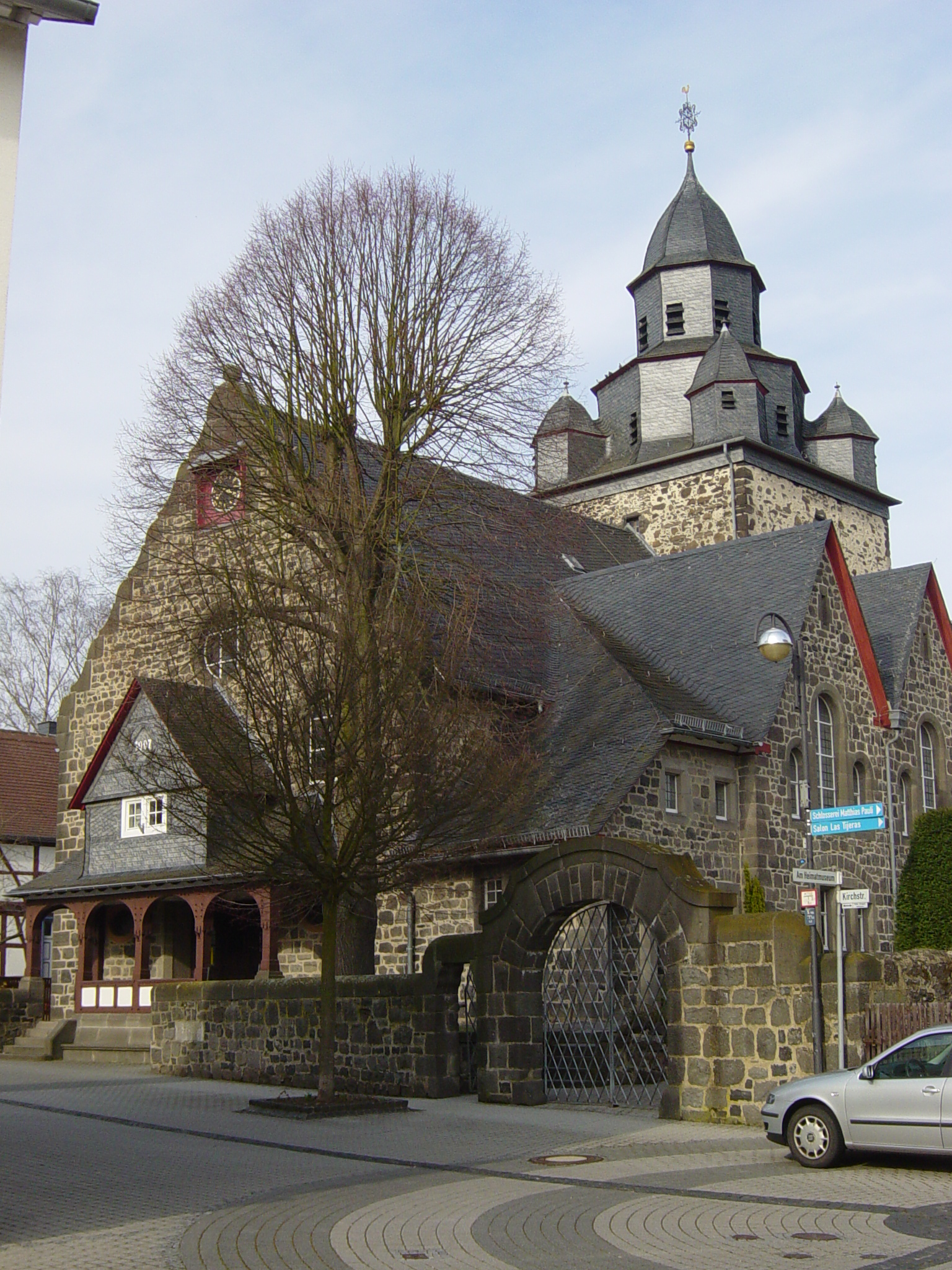
Protestant church in Leihgestern

- The Protestant Church (St. Peter) in Großen-Linden was presumably built in the 10th or 11th century and dates back in its current form to the 12th or 13th century. The church features a Romanesque portal from around 1170, richly decorated with figure reliefs, which is one of the few Romanesque figured portals in Germany. The church, the churchyard, and the town hall are enclosed by a shared wall that originates from a medieval defensive structure.
- The Town Hall was built around 1230 and has been modified many times. A significant renovation occurred according to a construction inscription in 1611; the building's half-timbered upper structure presumably dates from that year.
- The Protestant Rectory in Großen-Linden was built in 1452 and is considered the oldest rectory in Upper Hesse.
- The Catholic Christ the King Church in Großen-Linden was consecrated in 1954. Its construction became necessary after a large Catholic community developed locally due to the influx of Catholic refugees and displaced persons after World War II.
- The Schoolhouse was built in 1929 and was destroyed by a major fire in 1957, after which it was restored with a simplified roof structure.
- Furthermore, in Großen-Linden, there are several renovated historic half-timbered buildings from different eras.
- The Protestant Church of Leihgestern was consecrated on August 9, 1908. The late Gothic tower dates back to the 15th or 16th century.
- The historical Water House Leihgestern (elevated water reservoir) was built in 1907 and restored in 2010.

=== Museums ===
- Hüttenberger Heimatmuseum in the old town hall of Leihgestern
- Reineke Fuchs Museum in Leihgestern

=== Music ===
- The Musikcorps Großen-Linden is based in the borough of Großen-Linden. The club's greatest success was winning both the Marching and Show disciplines at the World Music Contest (Wereld Muziek Concours) in Kerkrade in 1974. In 2005, a gold medal with distinction was achieved there. In 2007, the Musikcorps Großen-Linden achieved the highest score in the marching evaluation for Brass Bands at the International Germany Cup in Alsfeld and won the Germany Cup. In the concert evaluation, 2nd place was achieved, followed by their own youth section, the Jugendmusikcorps Großen-Linden, which took 3rd place.

=== Protestant Piety ===
At the Anne Frank School, a regional club camp for young people is organized by the YMCA (CVJM). The highlight is a St. Thomas Mass.

=== Sport ===
The club TV-Großen-Linden played with a women's team in the Table Tennis Bundesliga during the 1985/86 season. In the women's 2nd Handball-Bundesliga, TSG 1893 Leihgestern played in the 2004/2005 season. The gymnastics team of TV Großen-Linden has competed in the 2nd Bundesliga of the German Gymnastics League (DTL) since 2014. Additionally, the town maintains an outdoor swimming pool.

=== Other associations ===
- Burschenschaft „Einigkeit“ Großen-Linden (Fraternity)
- Karnevalverein Harmonien (KVH - Carnival Club)
- TSG 1893 Leihgestern, with 2,200 members the town's largest sports club
- TSV Großen-Linden, plays with its first football team in the Kreisoberliga
- MSG Linden, plays with its 1. men's handball team in the Landesliga Hessen

=== Regular events ===
- Marienmarkt (St. Mary's Market), every year in March (in the old town area of Großen-Linden)
- Town Festival, always on the second weekend in August around the town hall
- Nikolausmarkt, always on the first weekend of Advent in the old village center of Leihgestern
- Kirmes (Funfair) in Großen-Linden, on the second weekend in July
- New Year's Concert of the Musikcorps Großen-Linden, every two years in January in the Linden Town Hall

== Economy and Infrastructure ==
=== Transport ===
The A 45 and the A 485 run through the town territory and intersect at the "Gießener Südkreuz". Furthermore, there is a railway station located on the Main-Weser Railway. Linden belongs to the Rhein-Main-Verkehrsverbund (RMV).

=== Established companies ===
- As the first company in the Lückebachtal industrial park, a hypermarket of the Metro Cash & Carry group was opened in 1980.
- One of the town's largest employers is Alternate, the largest German hardware mail-order company.
- Uvensys GmbH, a medium-sized Internet service provider.
- Aktiv-Mietpark, a construction machinery rental company.

=== Education ===
The Anne Frank School is a school-type-related comprehensive school with a remedial phase and gymnasial entry classes 5 and 6, a Hauptschule and Realschule branch, as well as a Gymnasium branch. There is also a primary school in each of the two boroughs: in Leihgestern primary school students are admitted to the Wiesengrundschule, in Großen-Linden to the Burgschule.

=== Youth rooms of the town of Linden ===
The town of Linden has set up new youth rooms in the building of the former civil defense central workshop of the state of Hesse. These are used for municipal youth work as well as for local club activities.

== Personalities ==
=== Sons and daughters of the town ===
- Ludwig Menges (1811–1898), Grand Ducal Hessian Court Councillor
- Ludwig Friedrich Römheld (1824–1871), jurist and district councillor in Lindenfels
- Reinhold Hoffmann (1831–1919), German chemist and industrial manager
- Friedrich Wolf (1853–1922), physician, politician, member of the 2nd Chamber of the Estates of the Grand Duchy of Hesse
- Johannes Leun (1855–1940), Hessian Landtag representative
- Georg Heß (1888–1967), local dialect poet
- Wilhelm Menges (1894–1963), German judge at the Reich Court and the Federal Court of Justice
- Manuel Lösel (born 1965), educator and since 2014 State Secretary in the Hessian Ministry of Culture
- Christoph Preuß (born 1981), German football player

== Literature ==
- Chronik der Stadt Großen-Linden, ed. by the Magistrat of the town of Großen-Linden 1976.
- Adolf Hepding: Zur Ortsgeschichte von Großen-Linden. In: Mitteilungen des Oberhessischen Geschichtsvereins, New Series, Twelfth Volume, Gießen, 1903, pp. 52–81.
- Kulturdenkmäler in Hessen. Landkreis Gießen II: Die Gemeinden Buseck, Fernwald, Grünberg, Langgöns, Linden, Pohlheim und Rabenau, Denkmaltopographie Bundesrepublik Deutschland, Landesamt für Denkmalpflege Hesse (Publisher), Konrad Theiss Verlag, 2010, ISBN 978-3-8062-2178-7.
- 1200 Jahre Leihgestern. Festival book and chronicle from 2005, ed. 1200 Jahre GbR Leihgestern.
- Otto Schulte; Marie-Luise Westermann (eds.): Die Geschichte Großen-Lindens und des Hüttenbergs. Mittelhessische Druck- und Verlagsgesellschaft, Gießen 1990, ISBN 3-924145-12-1.
