= Pohlheim =

- Town
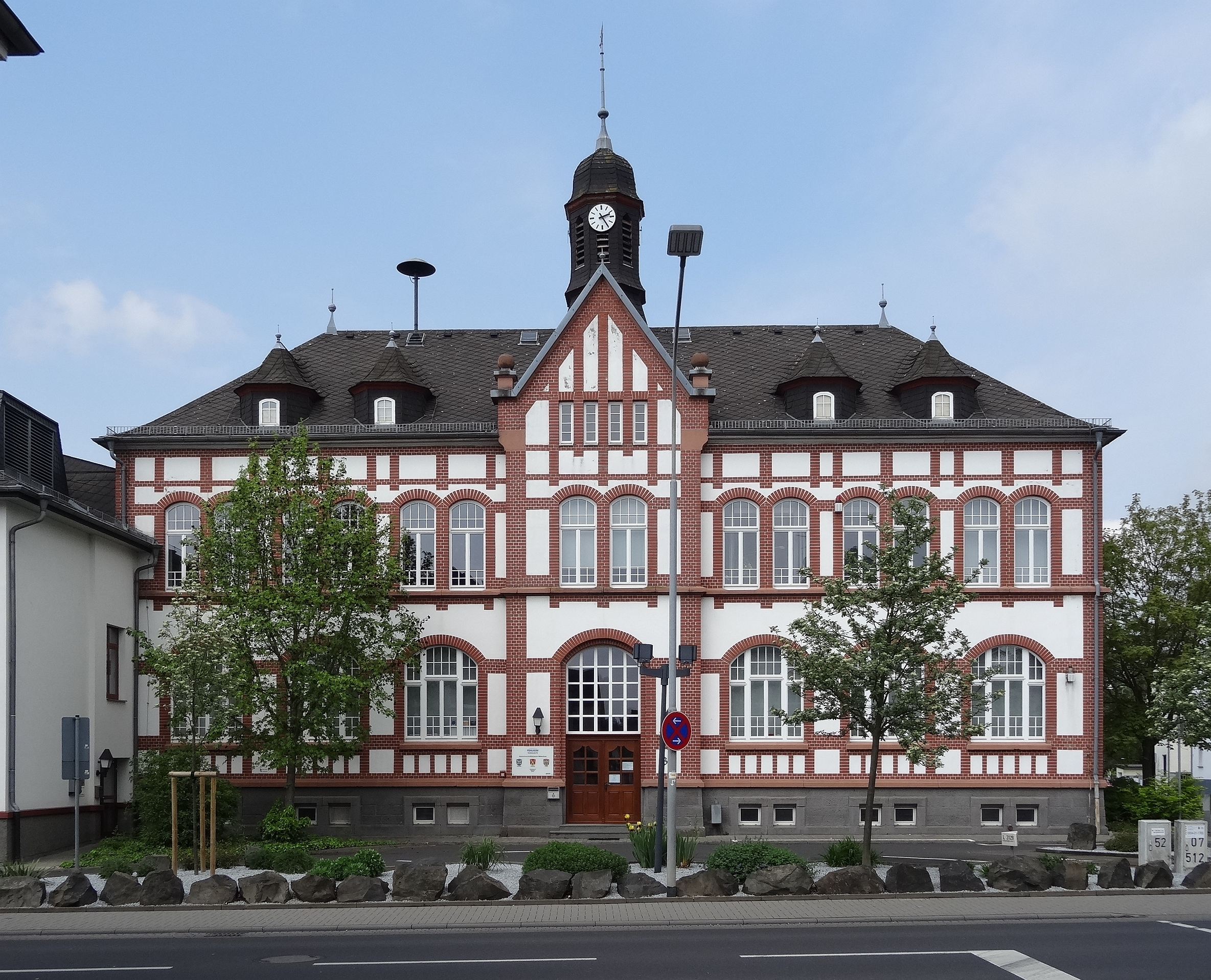
- Schule cultural monument in the Watzenborn-Steinberg district

- Coat of arms

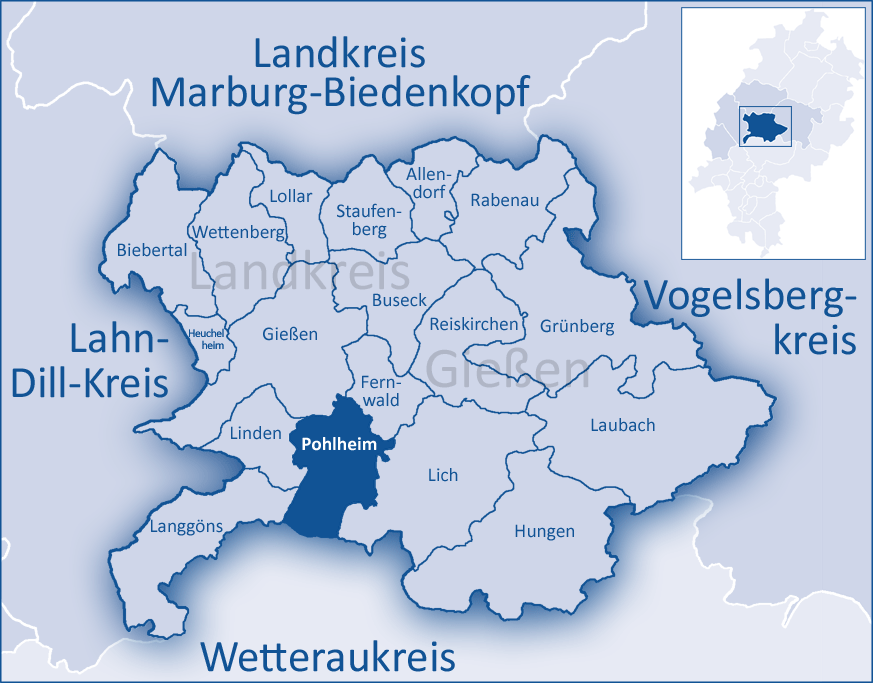
- Location of Pohlheim within Gießen district
- Interactive map of Pohlheim
- Location within Germany Location within Hesse
- Coordinates: 50°31′N 08°42′E
- Country: Germany
- State: Hesse
- Admin. region: Gießen
- District: Gießen

Government
  - Mayor (2020–26): Andreas Ruck (SPD)

Area
  - Total: 38 km^{2} (15 sq mi)
- Elevation: 215 m (705 ft)

Population (2025-12-31)
  - Total: 17,517
  - Density: 460/km^{2} (1,200/sq mi)
- Time zone: UTC+01:00 (CET)
  - Summer (DST): UTC+02:00 (CEST)
- Postal codes: 35415
- Dialling codes: 06403 / 0641 / 06404 / 06004
- Vehicle registration: GI
- Website: www.pohlheim.de

Pohlheim (German: [ˈpoːlhaɪm]) is a town in the district of Giessen, in Hesse, Germany. It is situated 6 km south of Giessen. After Giessen, Pohlheim is the largest municipality in the Giessen district by population.

== Geography ==
Pohlheim is located in the southern part of the Giessen district, and lies on the Lückenbach stream which flows into the Lahn via the Kleebach. The town covers an area of 38 km^{2} and borders Giessen and Fernwald from its north, Lich from its east, Münzenberg from its south, and Langgöns/Linden from its west. The town has six total districts: Dorf-Güll, Garbenteich, Grüningen, Hausen, Holzheim, and Watzenborn-Steinberg. The Upper Germanic-Rhaetian Limes run through the Pohlheim area.

== Local history ==
Pohlheim was founded on New Year's Eve of 1970, as part of administrative reforms in the state of Hesse. It involved the voluntary merger of the six municipalities of Dorf-Güll, Garbenteich, Grüningen, Hausen, Holzheim, and Watzenborn-Steinberg, which make up the six districts of the town today. After they merged, local districts with their own city councils and mayors were formed according to regulations of the Hessian Municipal Code. Pohlheim was granted official town status on September 21, 1974.

== Politics ==
=== City council elections ===
Parties and groups	2021		2016		2011		2006		2001	
Parties and groups	%	Seats	%	Seats	%	Seats	%	Seats	%	Seats
Social Democratic Party of Germany	34.3	13	31.8	12	34.5	13	35.5	13	40.4	15
Christian Democratic Union of Germany	30.6	11	38.6	14	39.1	14	41.2	15	39.4	15
Alliance 90/The Greens	16.0	6	9.6	4	13.9	5	7.3	3	6.7	2
Free Voters	12.6	5	14.2	5	9.8	4	11.8	4	9.1	3
Free Democratic Party	6.5	2	5.8	2	2.7	1	4.1	2	4.2	2
Total	100.0	37	100.0	37	100.0	37	100.0	37	100.0	37
% Invalid votes	2.5		4.0		3.1		2.9		2.9	
% Valid votes	52.7		51.0		49.2		47.6		58.5	

=== Mayors ===
According to the Hessian municipal constitution, the mayor is elected for a six-year term in a direct election starting from 1993, and is the chairman of the magistrate, which includes additional city councilors.

The following is a list of mayors of Pohlheim since 1971:

- 1971–1979 Karl Brückel (SDP)
- 1979–1997 Hermann Georg (CDU)
- 1997–2015 Karl-Heinz Schäfer (SDP)
- 2015–2021 Udo Schöffmann (CDU)
- 2021–2027 Andreas Ruck

=== Coat of arms ===
The coat of arms of Pohlheim consists of a set of leaves on a tree branch, a musical beam note on top of a staff, and a blue-lime watchtower. The tree branch and note are in the two areas left and right of the coat of arms with a red background, while the watchtower is in the middle with a yellow background. The leaves and the tree branch are derived from the coat of arms for Holzheim, Grüningen, and Garbenteich, while the musical note originates from that of Watzenborn-Steinberg. The watchtower represents all the districts coming together to form the town.

Each of the six districts of the town also have their own coat of arms designs.

Coat of arms of Pohlheim

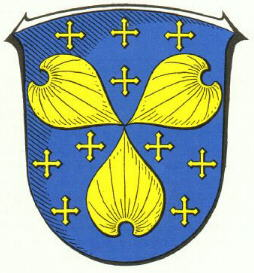
Coat of arms for Dorf-Güll district

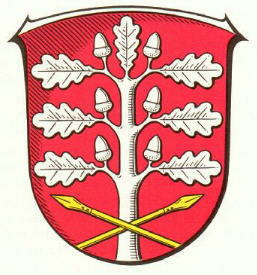
Coat of arms for Garbenteich district

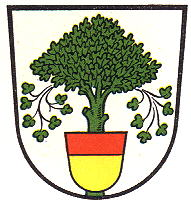
Coat of arms for Grüningen district

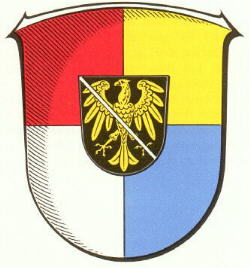
Coat of arms for Hausen district

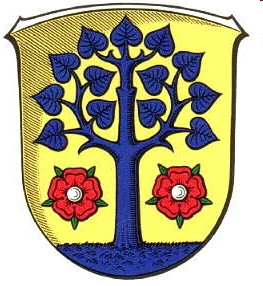
Coat of arms for Holzheim district

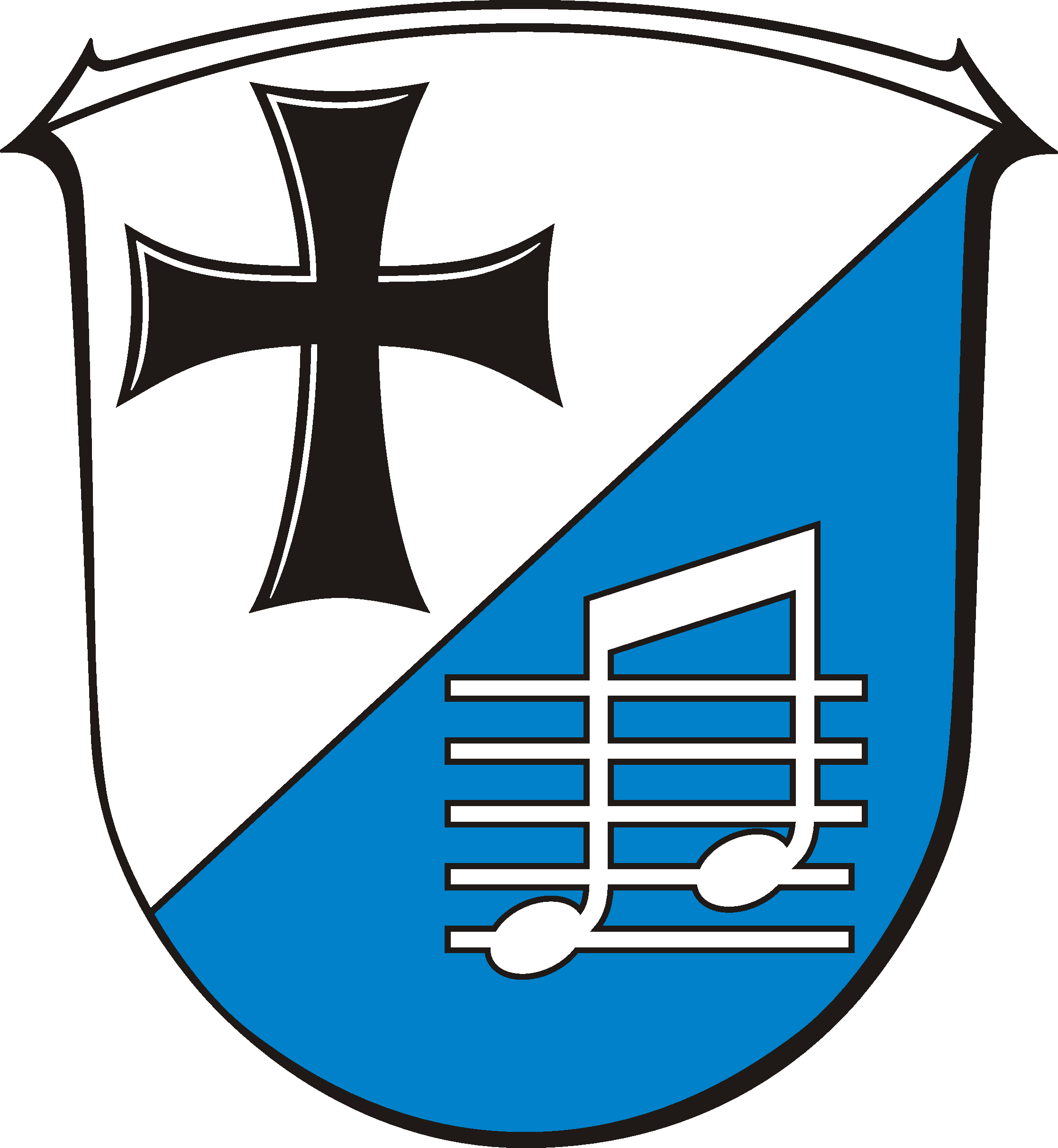
Coat of arms for Watzenborn-Steinberg district

== Demographics ==
The town of Pohlheim has a population of 18,572 as of the 2019 local census.

Historical population
Year	Pop.	±%
1999	17,119	—
2000	17,153	+0.2%
2002	17,442	+1.7%
2004	17,830	+2.2%
2005	17,909	+0.4%
2006	18,043	+0.7%
2007	18,051	+0.0%
2009	18,072	+0.1%
2010	18,108	+0.2%
2013	18,711	+3.3%
2016	18,094	−3.3%
2019	18,572	+2.6%
Population for Pohlheim from the Hessian State Statistical Office

== Transport ==
The town is located on the Gießen–Gelnhausen railway, where regional trains run hourly. Pohlheim is also connected to the German motorway (Autobahn) system and can also be reached by the Bundesautobahn 5 (A 5) and Bundesautobahn 45 (A 45) motorways, as well as the Bundesautobahn 485 (A 485) federal motorway.

== Twin towns – sister cities ==
Pohlheim is twinned with the following cities:

- Admont, Austria
- Zirc, Hungary
- Strehla, Saxony, Germany

== Notable people ==
- Paul Huthen (d. 1532), Roman Catholic prelate
- Felix Döring (b. 1991), politician of the Social Democratic Party
- Uwe Schulz (b. 1961), member of the Bundestag

== See also ==
- Cultural monuments in Pohlheim
- Natural monuments in Pohlheim
