= Éric Ferber =

French sculptor

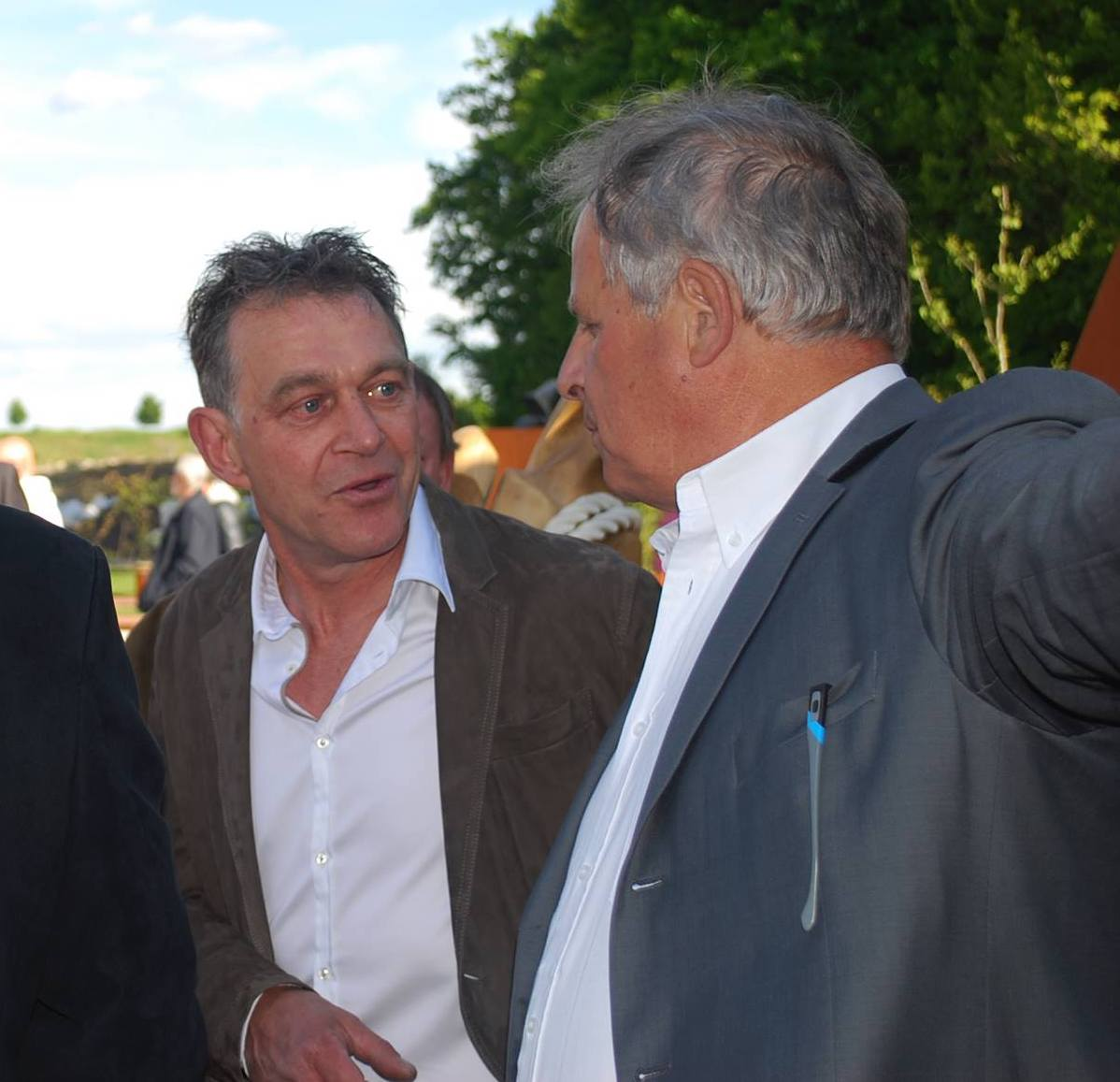
- Éric Ferber, on the left side, with Pierre Lang
- Born: 8 December 1961 (age 64); Étain, Meuse
- Known for: 1250.6, Pi, Pince à linge
- Movement: Contemporary art

Éric Ferber (born 8 December 1961) is a French sculptor known for his large-scale sculptures.

== Biography ==
Éric Ferber was born in Étain, Meuse. Ferber developed an interest in metallurgy as a child, when he would watch a craftsman at work in an old forge near his home. He became an apprentice steelworker at 14. He often works with aluminum, stainless steel and weathering steel to create sculptures and decorative art for green spaces. In 2014, he opened up an art exhibition in Henriville, where his studio is located. In 2018, an exhibition of 89 weathered steel cubes was opened at Jardin Des Arts in Châteaubourg.

In the spring of 2020 he moved to Paimpol, where he began to create a sculpture garden which is scheduled to open in 2022.
