= Freyming-Merlebach =

- Commune
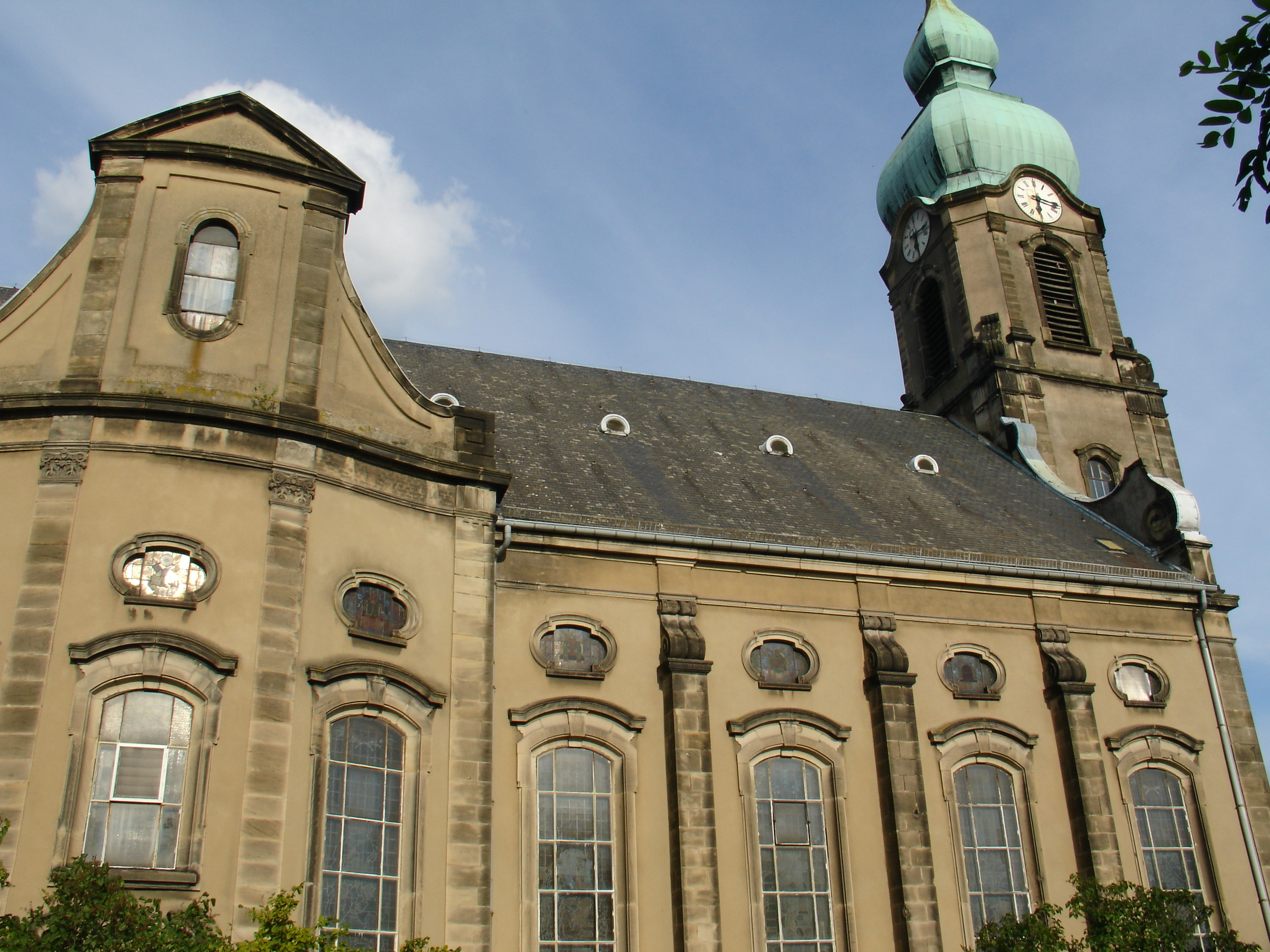
- Église Saint-Maurice

- Coat of arms
- Location of Freyming-Merlebach
- Location within France Location within Grand Est
- Coordinates: 49°08′33″N 6°47′59″E
- Country: France
- Region: Grand Est
- Department: Moselle
- Arrondissement: Forbach-Boulay-Moselle
- Canton: Freyming-Merlebach
- Intercommunality: Freyming-Merlebach

Government
  - Mayor (2020–2026): Pierre Lang
- Area^{1}: 9.06 km^{2} (3.50 sq mi)
- Elevation: 247 m (810 ft)
- Highest elevation: 346 m (1,135 ft)
- Lowest elevation: 200 m (660 ft)
- Population (2023): 13,266
  - Density: 1,460/km^{2} (3,790/sq mi)
- Demonym: Merlebachois(es)
- Time zone: UTC+01:00 (CET)
  - Summer (DST): UTC+02:00 (CEST)
- INSEE/Postal code: 57240 /57800
- Website: www.freyming-merlebach.fr
- ^{1} French Land Register data, which excludes lakes, ponds, glaciers > 1 km^{2} (0.386 sq mi or 247 acres) and river estuaries.

Freyming-Merlebach (French pronunciation: [fʁɛmɛ̃ mɛʁləbak]; German: Freimingen-Merlenbach) is a commune in the Moselle department in Grand Est in north-eastern France. It is part of the agglomeration of Saarbrücken and Forbach.

== Population ==
Historical population
Year	Pop.	±% p.a.
1968	17,604	—
1975	15,605	−1.71%
1982	16,214	+0.55%
1990	15,224	−0.78%
1999	14,461	−0.57%
2007	13,356	−0.99%
2012	13,122	−0.35%
2017	12,818	−0.47%
2023	13,266	+0.57%
Source: INSEE

== See also ==
- Communes of the Moselle department
