= Route nationale 56 =

Route nationale in France

Route nationale 56, RN56 or N56, is a 26 km long former route nationale (national road) linking Macheren to Sarralbe in the Grand-Est region of France. Reforms in 2004 transferred responsibility for its maintenance to the department of Moselle. Losing its national route status, the road was renumbered D 656. Its terminuses are the D 603 near Macheren to the northwest, and the D 661 near Sarralbe in the southeast.

Towns along the route include:

- Macheren (km 3)
- Barst (km 9)
- Cappel (km 10)
- Hoste-Bas (km 12)
- Puttelange-aux-Lacs (km 17)
- Richeling (km 20)
- Sarralbe (km 26)
