= Betting (disambiguation) =

Betting or gambling is wagering something of value in the hope of winning.

Betting may also refer to:

== Wagering ==
- Betting in poker
- Sports betting

== Places ==
- Betting, Moselle, a commune in France
