= Canton of Freyming-Merlebach =

Coordinates: 49.15°N 6.81°E

The canton of Freyming-Merlebach is an administrative division of the Moselle department, northeastern France. Its borders were modified at the French canton reorganisation which came into effect in March 2015. Its seat is in Freyming-Merlebach.

It consists of the following communes:

1. Barst
2. Béning-lès-Saint-Avold
3. Betting
4. Cappel
5. Farébersviller
6. Freyming-Merlebach
7. Guenviller
8. Henriville
9. Hombourg-Haut
10. Hoste
11. Seingbouse
