= Dießenbach =

River in Germany

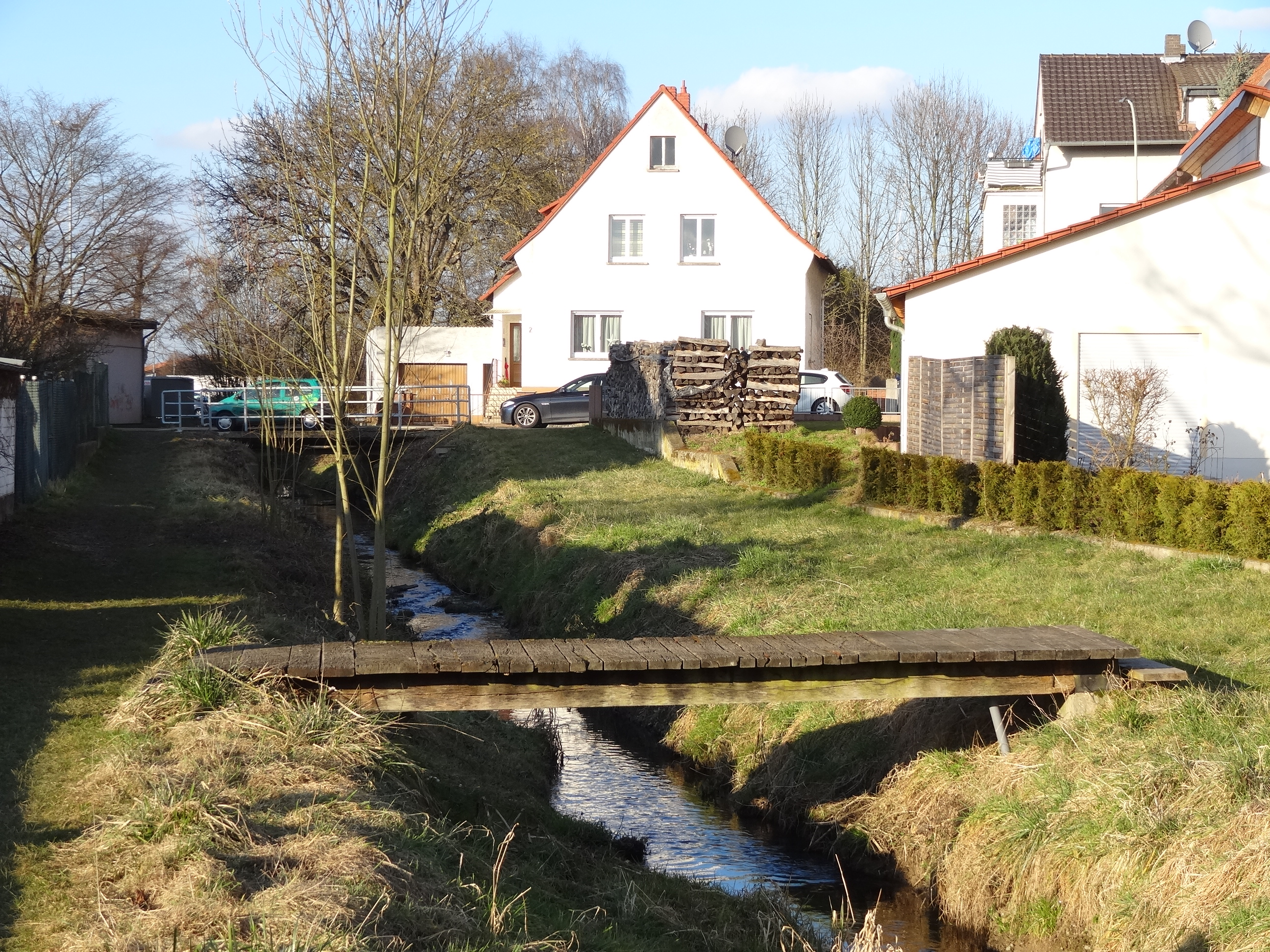
- The Gießenbach in Langgöns

Location
- Country: Germany
- State: Hesse

Physical characteristics
- Mouth
  - location: Kleebach
  - coordinates: 50.5247°N 8.6462°E
- Length: 10.7 km (6.6 mi)

Basin features
- Progression: Kleebach→ Lahn→ Rhine→ North Sea

The Dießenbach (German pronunciation: [ˈdiːsn̩bax]; also: Gönsbach) is a small brook and right tributary to the Kleebach brook in central Hesse, Germany. It flows into the Kleebach in Linden in the district of Gießen.

== See also ==
- List of rivers of Hesse
