= Barst =

Barst Barscht
- Commune
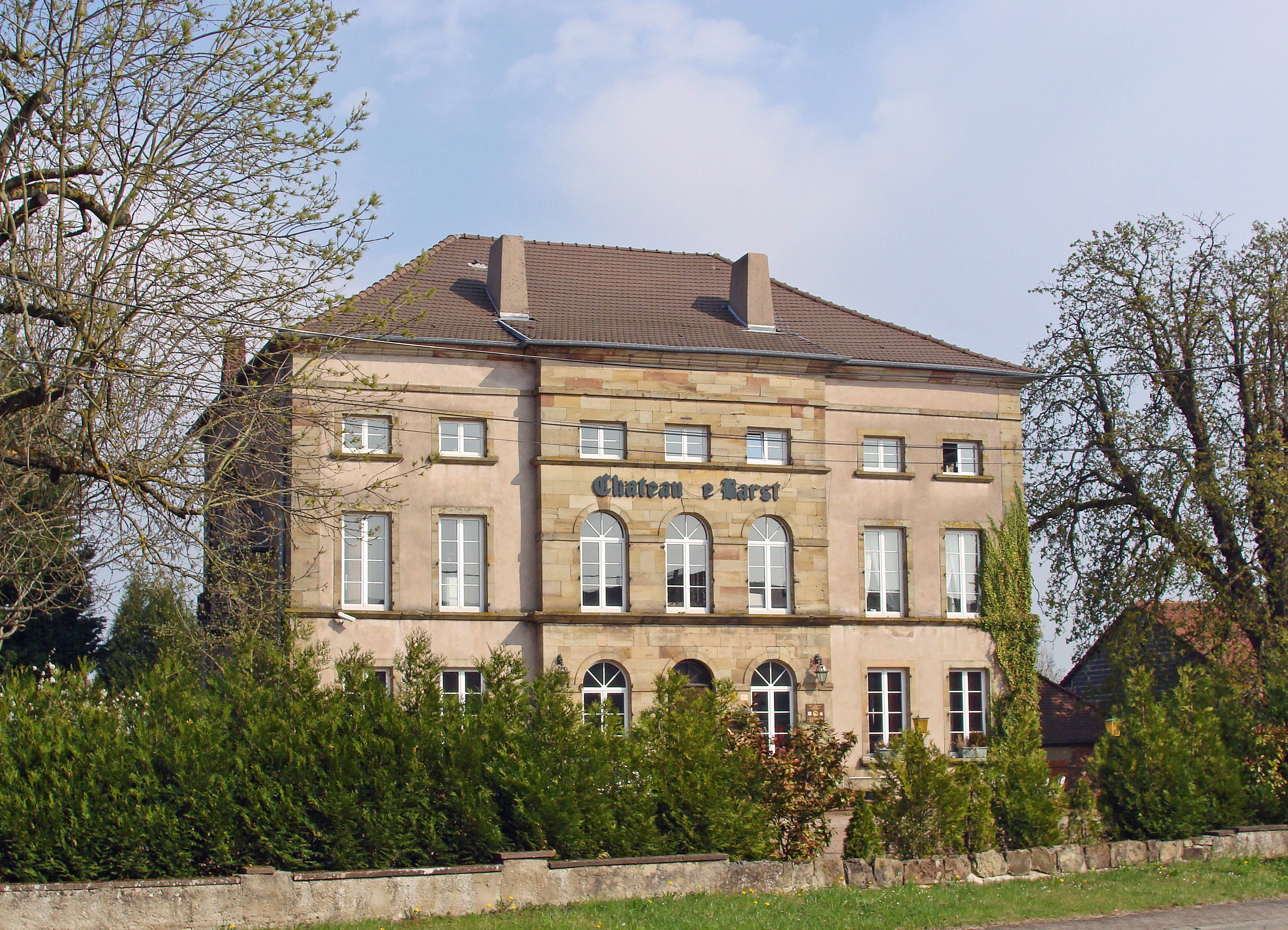
- The chateau in Barst

- Coat of arms
- Location of Barst
- Location within France Location within Grand Est
- Coordinates: 49°04′06″N 6°50′02″E
- Country: France
- Region: Grand Est
- Department: Moselle
- Arrondissement: Forbach-Boulay-Moselle
- Canton: Freyming-Merlebach
- Intercommunality: Freyming-Merlebach

Government
  - Mayor (2020–2026): Laurent Pierre
- Area^{1}: 5.79 km^{2} (2.24 sq mi)
- Elevation: 287 m (942 ft)
- Highest elevation: 306 m (1,004 ft)
- Lowest elevation: 226 m (741 ft)
- Population (2023): 570
  - Density: 98/km^{2} (250/sq mi)
- Time zone: UTC+01:00 (CET)
  - Summer (DST): UTC+02:00 (CEST)
- INSEE/Postal code: 57052 /57450
- ^{1} French Land Register data, which excludes lakes, ponds, glaciers > 1 km^{2} (0.386 sq mi or 247 acres) and river estuaries.

Barst (French pronunciation: [baʁst]; German: Barst) is a commune in the Moselle department in Grand Est in northeastern France.

The village is situated on the N56 road.

== Population ==
Historical population
| Year | Pop. | ±% p.a. |
|---|---|---|
| 1968 | 349 | — |
| 1975 | 358 | +0.36% |
| 1982 | 392 | +1.30% |
| 1990 | 453 | +1.82% |
| 1999 | 483 | +0.72% |
| 2007 | 546 | +1.54% |
| 2012 | 566 | +0.72% |
| 2017 | 579 | +0.46% |
| 2023 | 570 | −0.26% |
Source: INSEE

== See also ==
- Communes of the Moselle department
