= Henriville =

- Commune
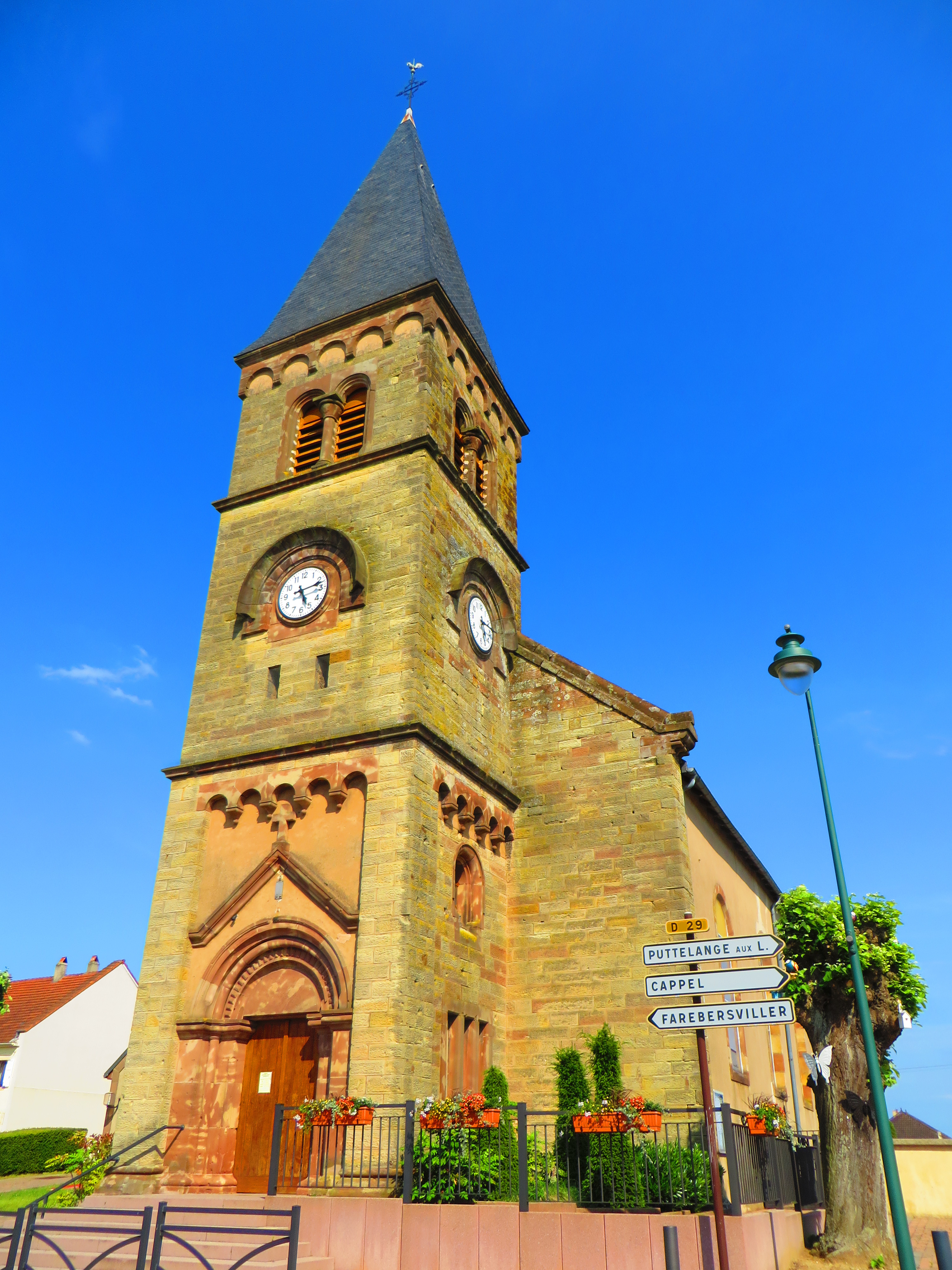
- The church in Henriville

- Coat of arms
- Location of Henriville
- Location within France Location within Grand Est
- Coordinates: 49°05′46″N 6°51′15″E
- Country: France
- Region: Grand Est
- Department: Moselle
- Arrondissement: Forbach-Boulay-Moselle
- Canton: Freyming-Merlebach
- Intercommunality: Freyming-Merlebach

Government
  - Mayor (2020–2026): Denis Eyl
- Area^{1}: 3.95 km^{2} (1.53 sq mi)
- Elevation: 243 m (797 ft)
- Highest elevation: 302 m (991 ft)
- Lowest elevation: 260 m (850 ft)
- Population (2023): 742
  - Density: 188/km^{2} (487/sq mi)
- Time zone: UTC+01:00 (CET)
  - Summer (DST): UTC+02:00 (CEST)
- INSEE/Postal code: 57316 /57450
- ^{1} French Land Register data, which excludes lakes, ponds, glaciers > 1 km^{2} (0.386 sq mi or 247 acres) and river estuaries.

Henriville (French pronunciation: [ɑ̃ʁivil]; German: Herrchweiler) is a commune in the Moselle department in Grand Est in north-eastern France.

== History ==
Henriville was founded in 1608 by Duke Henry II of Lorraine (German; Heinrich II von Lothringen) as one of around thirty villages that sprung up in the vicinity of Moselle between 1600 and 1630 with the rising population due to increasing trade in the east part of the country.

== Politics and administration ==
=== Voting history ===
- 2002 Presidential Election : Second Road, Jacques Chirac (RPR) 70,66%, Jean-Marie Le Pen (FN) 29,34%.
- Legislatives 2002: Second Round, Pierre Lang (RPR) 69,05%, Roland Metzinger (PS) 30,95%.
- Cantonal Elections 2004 : Second Round, Laurent Kleinhentz (PS) 67,78%, Jean-Paul Brunot (DVD) 32,22%.
- Regional Elections 2004 : Second Round, Gérard Longuet (LDR) 40,10%, Jean-Pierre Masseret (PS) 37,13%, Thierry Gourlot (FN) 22,77%.
- 2004 European Parliament election : In the First and only round, Bruno Gollnisch (FN) 27,98%, followed by Pierre Moscovici (PS) 22,80%, finally Joseph Daul (UMP) 15,03%.
- 2005 French European Constitution referendum : No 56,81%, Yes 43,19%.
- Presidential Election, 2007 : Second Round, Nicolas Sarkozy (UMP) 70%, Ségolène Royal (PS) 30%.
- Legislatives, 2007 : Second Round, Pierre Lang (UMP) 81,45%, Michel Obiegala (PS) 18,55%.
- 2009 European Parliament election : First and only round, Joseph Daul (UMP) 28,57% followed by Bruno Gollnisch (FN) 20%, finally Jean-François Kahn (Modem) 16,57%.
- Regionals 2010 : Second Round, Thierry Gourlot (FN) 35,88%, Jean-Pierre Masseret (PS) 32,82%, Laurent Hénart (UMP) 31,30%.
- Cantonals, 2011 : Second Round, Laurent Kleinhentz (PS) 50,73%, Éric Vilain (FN) 49,27%.
- Presidential Election, 2012 : Second Round, Nicolas Sarkozy (UMP) 68,44%, François Hollande (PS) 31,56%.
- Legislatives, 2012 : Second Round, Florian Philippot (FN) 61,01%, Laurent Kalinowski (PS) 38,99%.
- 2014 European Parliament election : First and only round, Florian Philippot (FN) 59,62%, followed by Nadine Morano (UMP) 13,46%, finally Nathalie Griesbeck (Modem-UDI) 5,77%.

== Notable residents ==
Hubert de Brienne, Comte de Conflans (1690–1777), vice admiral of the French Navy and Marshall of France. Born in Henriville. Also, Ludo.

== See also ==
- Communes of the Moselle department
