= Richeling =

- Commune
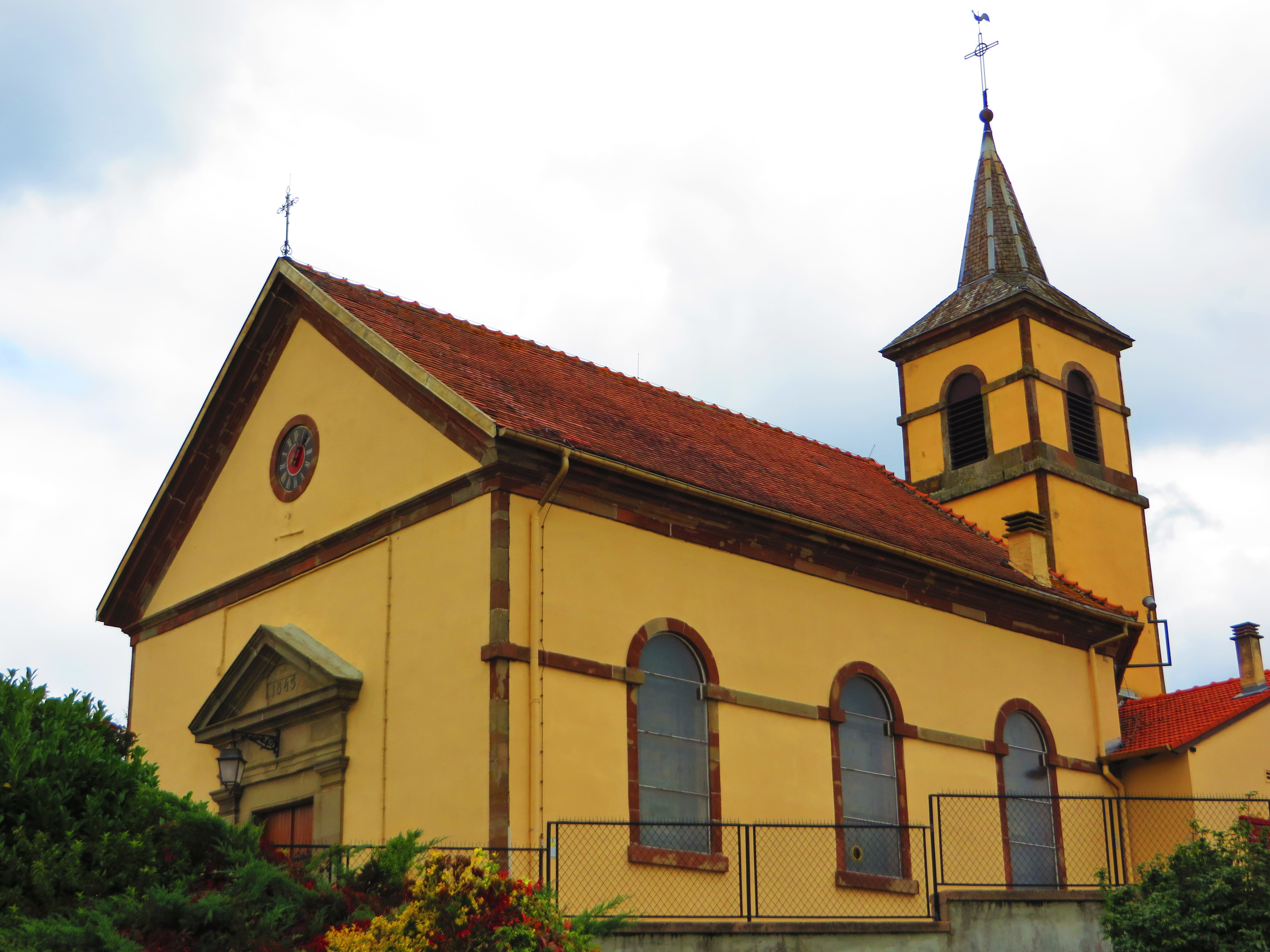
- The church in Richeling

- Coat of arms
- Location of Richeling
- Location within France Location within Grand Est
- Coordinates: 49°01′48″N 6°57′41″E
- Country: France
- Region: Grand Est
- Department: Moselle
- Arrondissement: Sarreguemines
- Canton: Sarralbe
- Intercommunality: CA Sarreguemines Confluences

Government
  - Mayor (2021–2026): Freddy Litty
- Area^{1}: 4.21 km^{2} (1.63 sq mi)
- Elevation: 320 m (1,050 ft)
- Highest elevation: 264 m (866 ft)
- Lowest elevation: 217 m (712 ft)
- Population (2023): 347
  - Density: 82.4/km^{2} (213/sq mi)
- Time zone: UTC+01:00 (CET)
  - Summer (DST): UTC+02:00 (CEST)
- INSEE/Postal code: 57581 /57510
- ^{1} French Land Register data, which excludes lakes, ponds, glaciers > 1 km^{2} (0.386 sq mi or 247 acres) and river estuaries.

Richeling (French pronunciation: [ʁiʃlɛ̃]; German: Richelingen) is a commune in the Moselle department in Grand Est in north-eastern France.

The village is situated on the N56 road.

== See also ==
- Communes of the Moselle department
