= Guenviller =

- Commune
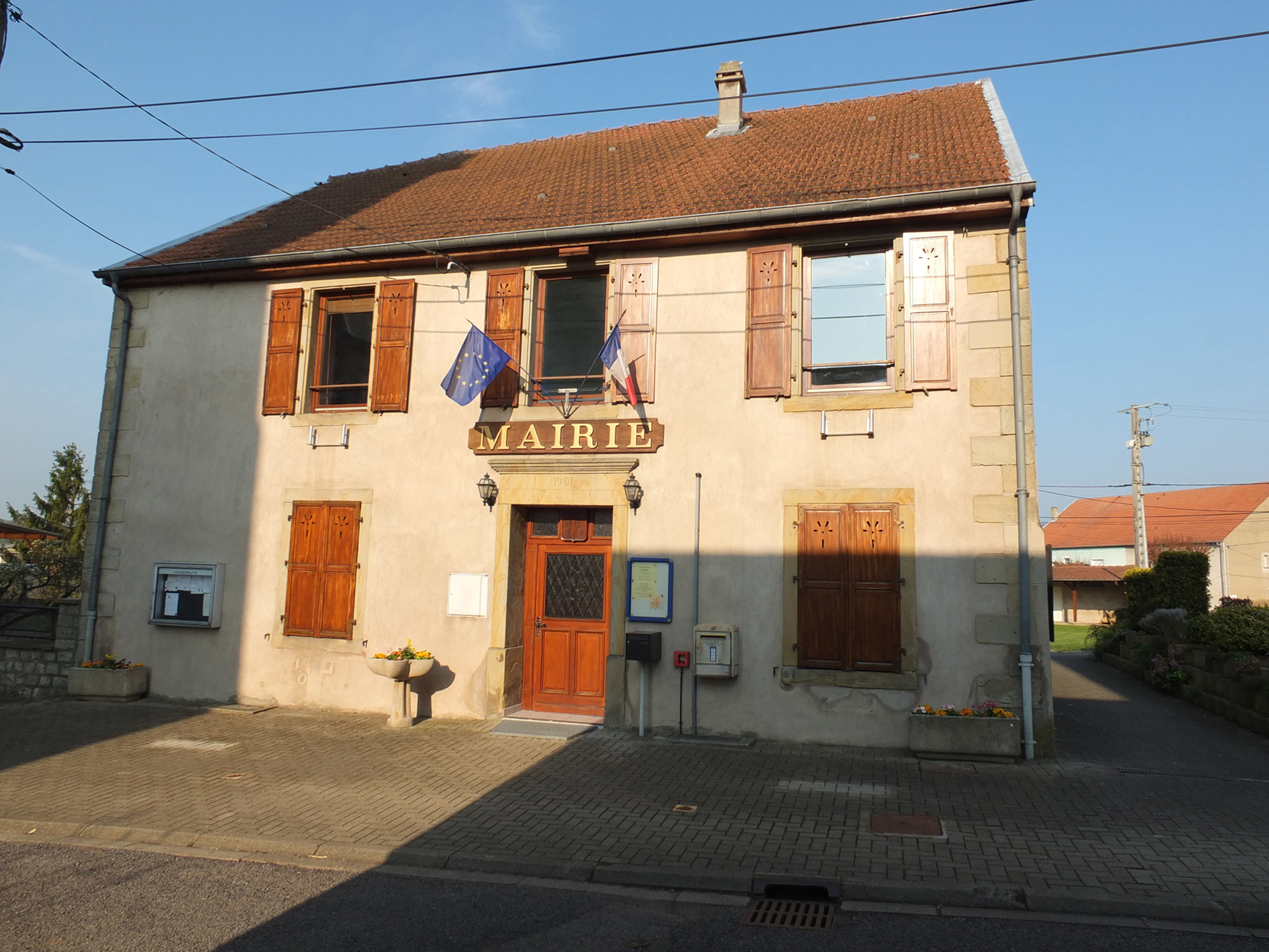
- The town hall in Guenviller

- Coat of arms
- Location of Guenviller
- Location within France Location within Grand Est
- Coordinates: 49°06′28″N 6°47′57″E
- Country: France
- Region: Grand Est
- Department: Moselle
- Arrondissement: Forbach-Boulay-Moselle
- Canton: Freyming-Merlebach
- Intercommunality: Freyming-Merlebach

Government
  - Mayor (2020–2026): Raymond Trunkwald
- Area^{1}: 4.74 km^{2} (1.83 sq mi)
- Elevation: 230 m (750 ft)
- Highest elevation: 361 m (1,184 ft)
- Lowest elevation: 264 m (866 ft)
- Population (2023): 680
  - Density: 140/km^{2} (370/sq mi)
- Time zone: UTC+01:00 (CET)
  - Summer (DST): UTC+02:00 (CEST)
- INSEE/Postal code: 57271 /57470
- ^{1} French Land Register data, which excludes lakes, ponds, glaciers > 1 km^{2} (0.386 sq mi or 247 acres) and river estuaries.

Guenviller (French pronunciation: [ɡɛnvilɛʁ]; German: Genweiler) is a commune in the Moselle department in Grand Est in north-eastern France.

== See also ==
- Communes of the Moselle department
