= Seingbouse =

- Commune
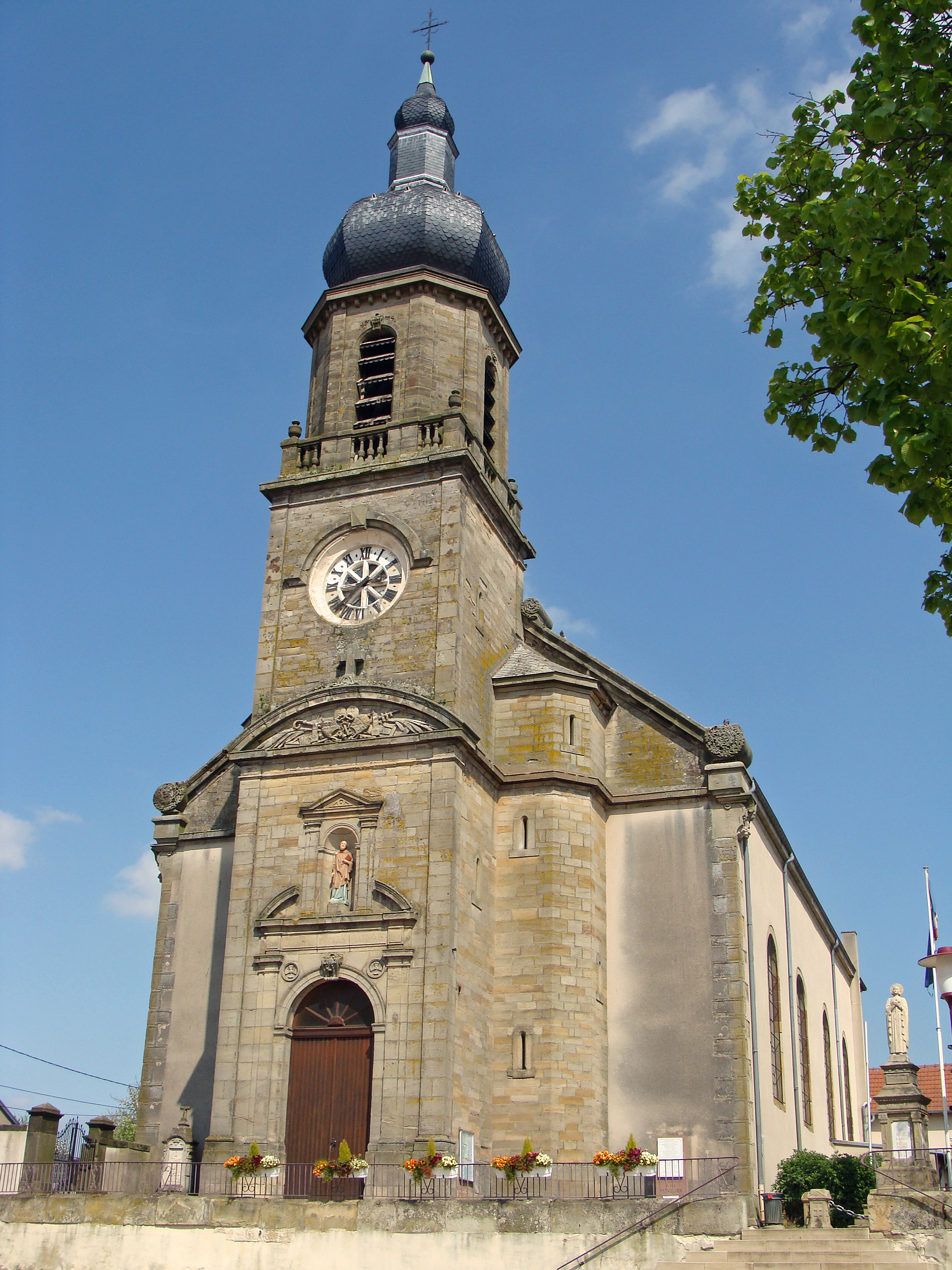
- The church in Seingbouse

- Coat of arms
- Location of Seingbouse
- Location within France Location within Grand Est
- Coordinates: 49°06′51″N 6°49′55″E
- Country: France
- Region: Grand Est
- Department: Moselle
- Arrondissement: Forbach-Boulay-Moselle
- Canton: Freyming-Merlebach
- Intercommunality: Freyming-Merlebach

Government
  - Mayor (2022–2026): Nicolas Reisch
- Area^{1}: 8.05 km^{2} (3.11 sq mi)
- Elevation: 305 m (1,001 ft)
- Highest elevation: 348 m (1,142 ft)
- Lowest elevation: 260 m (850 ft)
- Population (2023): 1,722
  - Density: 214/km^{2} (554/sq mi)
- Time zone: UTC+01:00 (CET)
  - Summer (DST): UTC+02:00 (CEST)
- INSEE/Postal code: 57644 /57455
- ^{1} French Land Register data, which excludes lakes, ponds, glaciers > 1 km^{2} (0.386 sq mi or 247 acres) and river estuaries.

Seingbouse (French pronunciation: [sɛ̃buz]; German: Sengbusch) is a commune in the Moselle department in Grand Est in north-eastern France.

== Climate ==
On average, Seingbouse experiences 61.1 days per year with a minimum temperature below 0 °C (32.0 °F), 1.3 days per year with a minimum temperature below −10 °C (14.0 °F), 14.0 days per year with a maximum temperature below 0 °C (32.0 °F), and 11.1 days per year with a maximum temperature above 30 °C (86.0 °F). The record high temperature was 37.9 °C (100.2 °F) on July 25, 2019, while the record low temperature was −17.0 °C (1.4 °F) on December 20, 2009.

Climate data for Seingbouse (1991–2020 normals, extremes 2003–present)
Month	Jan	Feb	Mar	Apr	May	Jun	Jul	Aug	Sep	Oct	Nov	Dec	Year
Record high °C (°F)	13.9 (57.0)	21.4 (70.5)	23.9 (75.0)	26.8 (80.2)	31.3 (88.3)	35.4 (95.7)	37.9 (100.2)	37.8 (100.0)	32.6 (90.7)	27.0 (80.6)	21.0 (69.8)	14.9 (58.8)	37.9 (100.2)
Mean daily maximum °C (°F)	4.0 (39.2)	5.4 (41.7)	10.0 (50.0)	15.5 (59.9)	18.6 (65.5)	22.5 (72.5)	24.7 (76.5)	24.0 (75.2)	20.0 (68.0)	14.4 (57.9)	8.5 (47.3)	4.8 (40.6)	14.4 (57.9)
Daily mean °C (°F)	1.8 (35.2)	2.6 (36.7)	6.1 (43.0)	10.7 (51.3)	13.8 (56.8)	17.6 (63.7)	19.7 (67.5)	19.1 (66.4)	15.4 (59.7)	10.9 (51.6)	6.0 (42.8)	2.7 (36.9)	10.5 (51.0)
Mean daily minimum °C (°F)	−0.4 (31.3)	−0.2 (31.6)	2.2 (36.0)	5.9 (42.6)	9.1 (48.4)	12.6 (54.7)	14.6 (58.3)	14.2 (57.6)	10.8 (51.4)	7.4 (45.3)	3.6 (38.5)	0.5 (32.9)	6.7 (44.1)
Record low °C (°F)	−12.3 (9.9)	−15.3 (4.5)	−12.4 (9.7)	−3.4 (25.9)	−0.3 (31.5)	3.9 (39.0)	7.4 (45.3)	5.8 (42.4)	3.1 (37.6)	−5.2 (22.6)	−7.2 (19.0)	−17.0 (1.4)	−17.0 (1.4)
Average precipitation mm (inches)	63.0 (2.48)	57.7 (2.27)	55.3 (2.18)	39.8 (1.57)	68.9 (2.71)	60.3 (2.37)	54.7 (2.15)	68.4 (2.69)	54.8 (2.16)	61.4 (2.42)	66.0 (2.60)	81.1 (3.19)	731.4 (28.79)
Average precipitation days (≥ 1.0 mm)	12.4	9.5	9.7	7.5	10.0	9.1	8.6	9.9	7.3	9.7	10.6	12.7	117.0
Source: Meteociel

== See also ==
- Communes of the Moselle department
