= Farébersviller =

- Commune
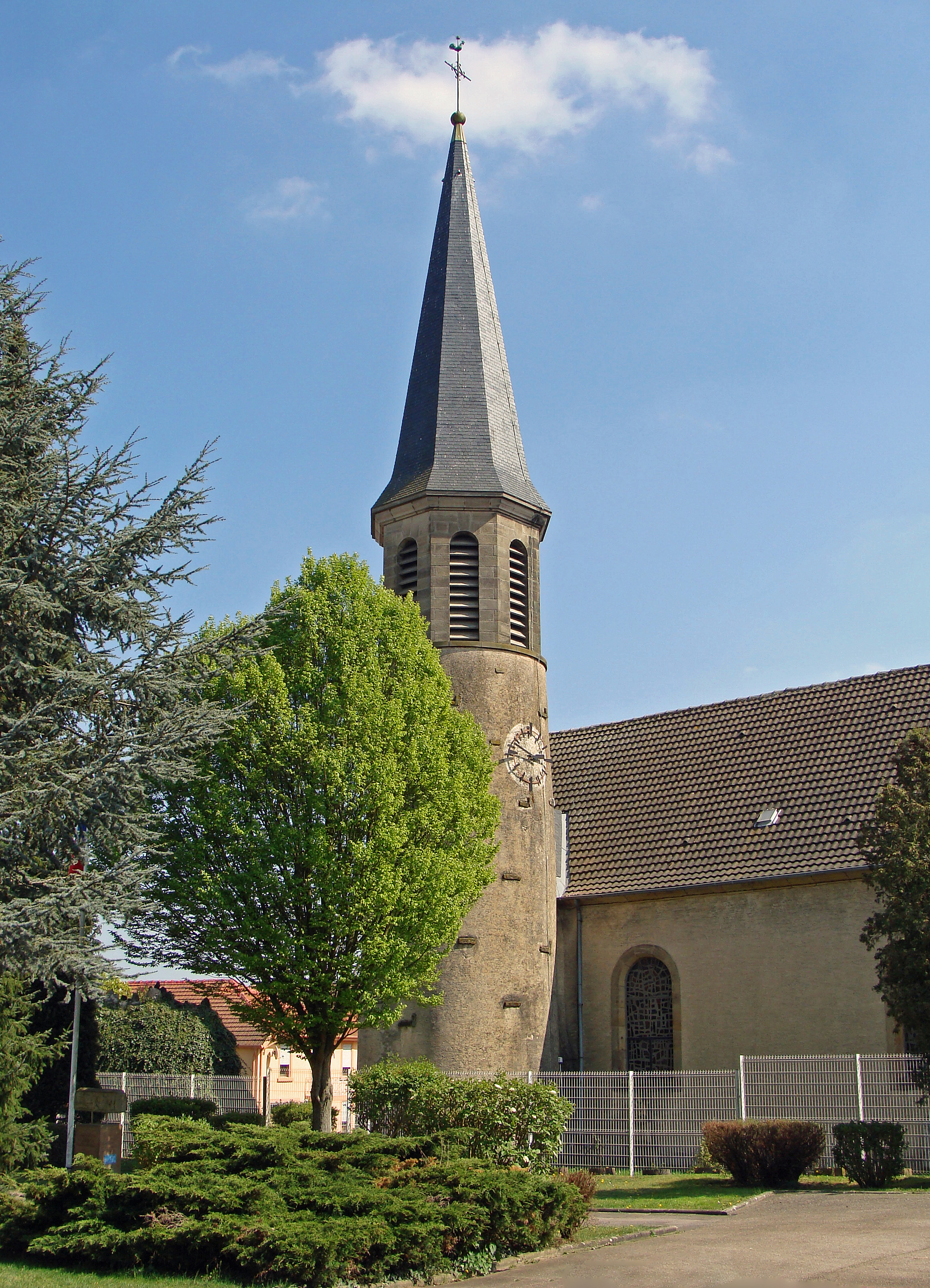
- The church in Farébersviller

- Coat of arms
- Location of Farébersviller
- Location within France Location within Grand Est
- Coordinates: 49°06′56″N 6°51′52″E
- Country: France
- Region: Grand Est
- Department: Moselle
- Arrondissement: Forbach-Boulay-Moselle
- Canton: Freyming-Merlebach
- Intercommunality: Freyming-Merlebach

Government
  - Mayor (2020–2026): Laurent Kleinhentz
- Area^{1}: 6.88 km^{2} (2.66 sq mi)
- Highest elevation: 321 m (1,053 ft)
- Lowest elevation: 219 m (719 ft)
- Population (2023): 5,224
  - Density: 759/km^{2} (1,970/sq mi)
- Time zone: UTC+01:00 (CET)
  - Summer (DST): UTC+02:00 (CEST)
- INSEE/Postal code: 57207 /57450
- ^{1} French Land Register data, which excludes lakes, ponds, glaciers > 1 km^{2} (0.386 sq mi or 247 acres) and river estuaries.

Farébersviller (French pronunciation: [faʁebɛʁsvilɛʁ]; Lorraine Franconian: Fareewerschwiller/Ewerschwiller; German: Pfarrebersweiler) is a commune in the Moselle department in Grand Est in north-eastern France.

It is located only 3 km from the German border.

== Location ==
Farébersviller lies at the heart of the coalfield between 3 major cities that are Forbach, Sarreguemines and Saint-Avold.

The municipality consists of 2 very different entities that are the village, the original place to the south and the city, created from 1954 by the Houillères du Bassin de Lorraine (HBL) to accommodate a large number of miners working in the Valley the Rosselle nearby.

== Administration ==
Since 1989 the mayor of the municipality is Laurent Kleinhentz.

== Demography ==
Historical population
Year	Pop.	±% p.a.
1968	8,001	—
1975	7,783	−0.39%
1982	7,122	−1.26%
1990	6,835	−0.51%
1999	6,876	+0.07%
2007	5,983	−1.72%
2012	5,692	−0.99%
2017	5,541	−0.54%
2023	5,224	−0.98%
Source: INSEE

== Sites and monuments ==
=== Religious Buildings ===
- The church of Saint-Jean-Baptiste
- The church of Sainte-Thérèse
- The chapel of Saint-Antoine
- El-Hijra Mosque with minaret

=== Cultural structures ===
- Good Fountain Square and the local art house in the village
- Social Center St-Exupery
- Center François Rabelais

=== Sports equipment ===
- Complex Marcel Cerdan
- COSEC
- Small Gym
- Tennis Stadium
- Soccer Stadium
- Archery

== Personalities associated with the municipality ==
- Gennaro Bracigliano (1980- ), Goalkeeper at l'ASNL

== Twinnings ==
- Italy Mercato San Severino - Italy

== See also ==
- Communes of the Moselle department
