= Schwingbach =

River in Germany

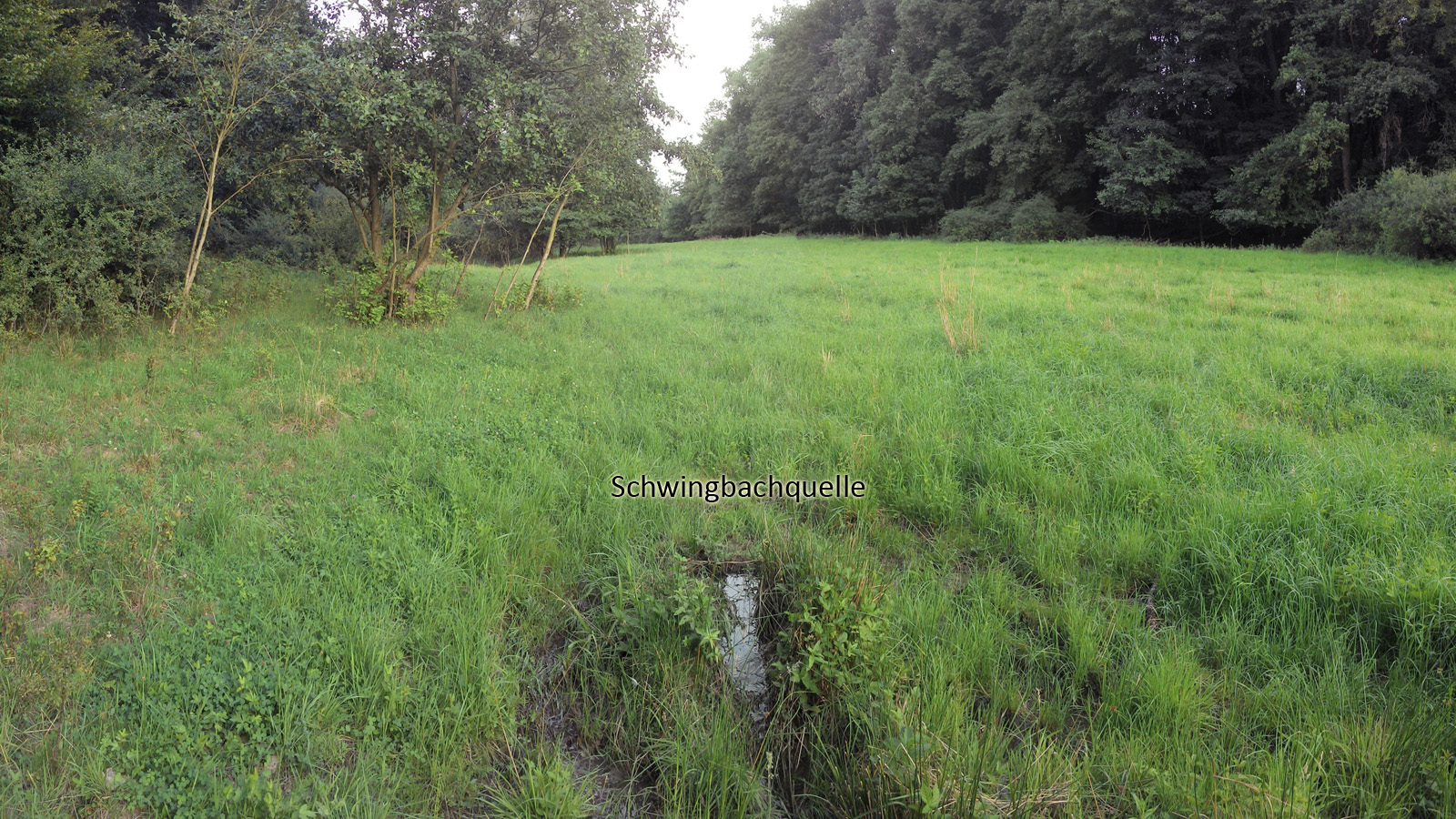

Location
- Country: Germany
- State: Hesse

Physical characteristics
- Mouth
  - location: Kleebach
  - coordinates: 50°30′59″N 8°37′40″E
- Length: 10.9 km (6.8 mi)

Basin features
- Progression: Kleebach→ Lahn→ Rhine→ North Sea

The Schwingbach is a small 11-kilometre-long (6.8 mi) left tributary to the Kleebach river in central Hesse, Germany. It flows into the Kleebach in Hüttenberg.

== See also ==
- List of rivers of Hesse
