= Hoste, Moselle =

Hoste
- Commune
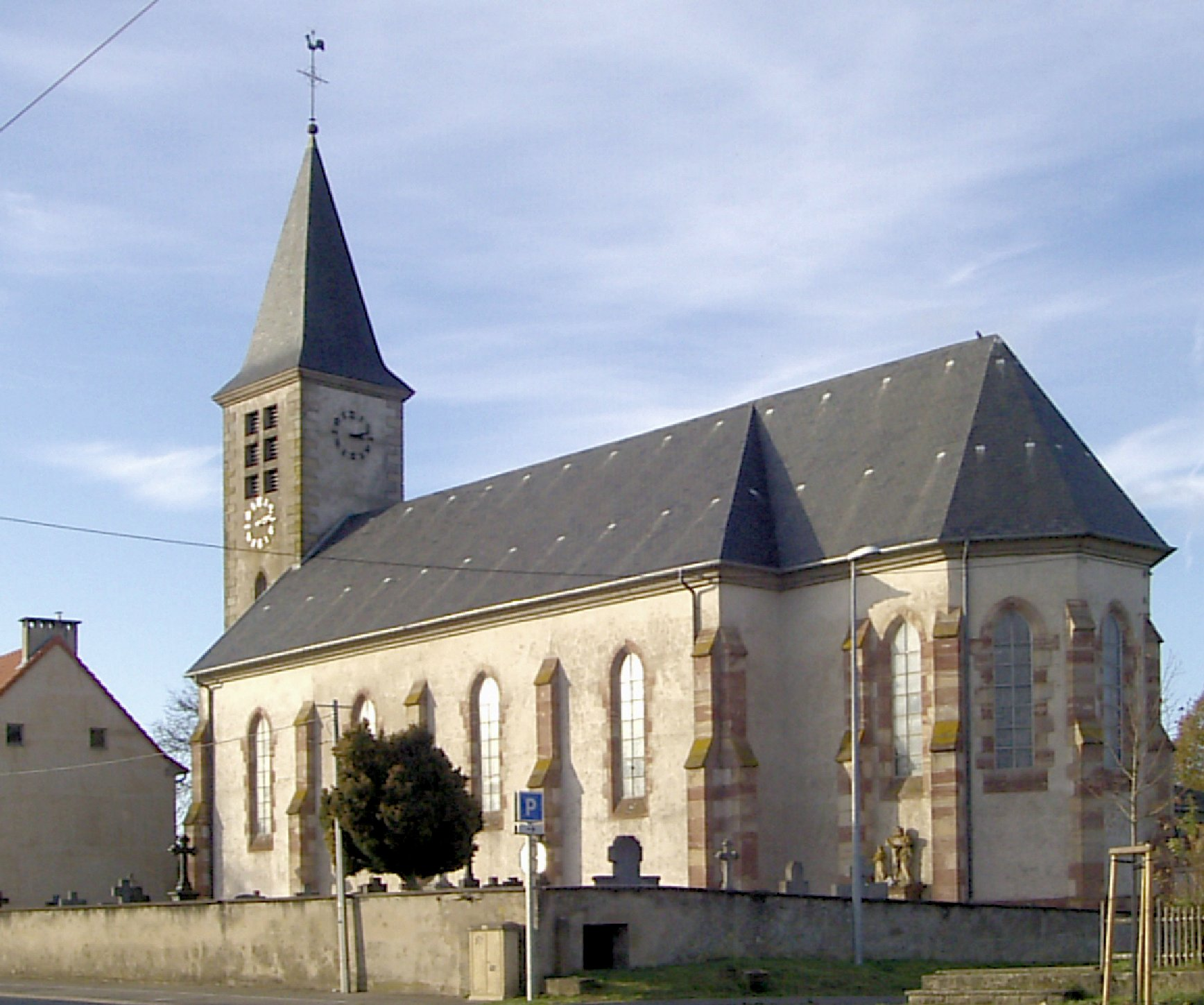
- The church in Hoste

- Coat of arms
- Location of Hoste
- Location within France Location within Grand Est
- Coordinates: 49°04′11″N 6°53′05″E
- Country: France
- Region: Grand Est
- Department: Moselle
- Arrondissement: Forbach-Boulay-Moselle
- Canton: Freyming-Merlebach
- Intercommunality: CC de Freyming-Merlebach

Government
  - Mayor (2020–2026): Michel Jacques
- Area^{1}: 9.47 km^{2} (3.66 sq mi)
- Elevation: 200 m (660 ft)
- Highest elevation: 306 m (1,004 ft)
- Lowest elevation: 226 m (741 ft)
- Population (2023): 562
  - Density: 59.3/km^{2} (154/sq mi)
- Time zone: UTC+01:00 (CET)
  - Summer (DST): UTC+02:00 (CEST)
- INSEE/Postal code: 57337 /57510
- ^{1} French Land Register data, which excludes lakes, ponds, glaciers > 1 km^{2} (0.386 sq mi or 247 acres) and river estuaries.

Hoste (French pronunciation: [ɔst]; German: Host) is a commune in the Moselle department in Grand Est in north-eastern France.

The village is situated on the N56 road.

== See also ==
- Communes of the Moselle department
