= Cappel, Moselle =

Cappel
- Commune
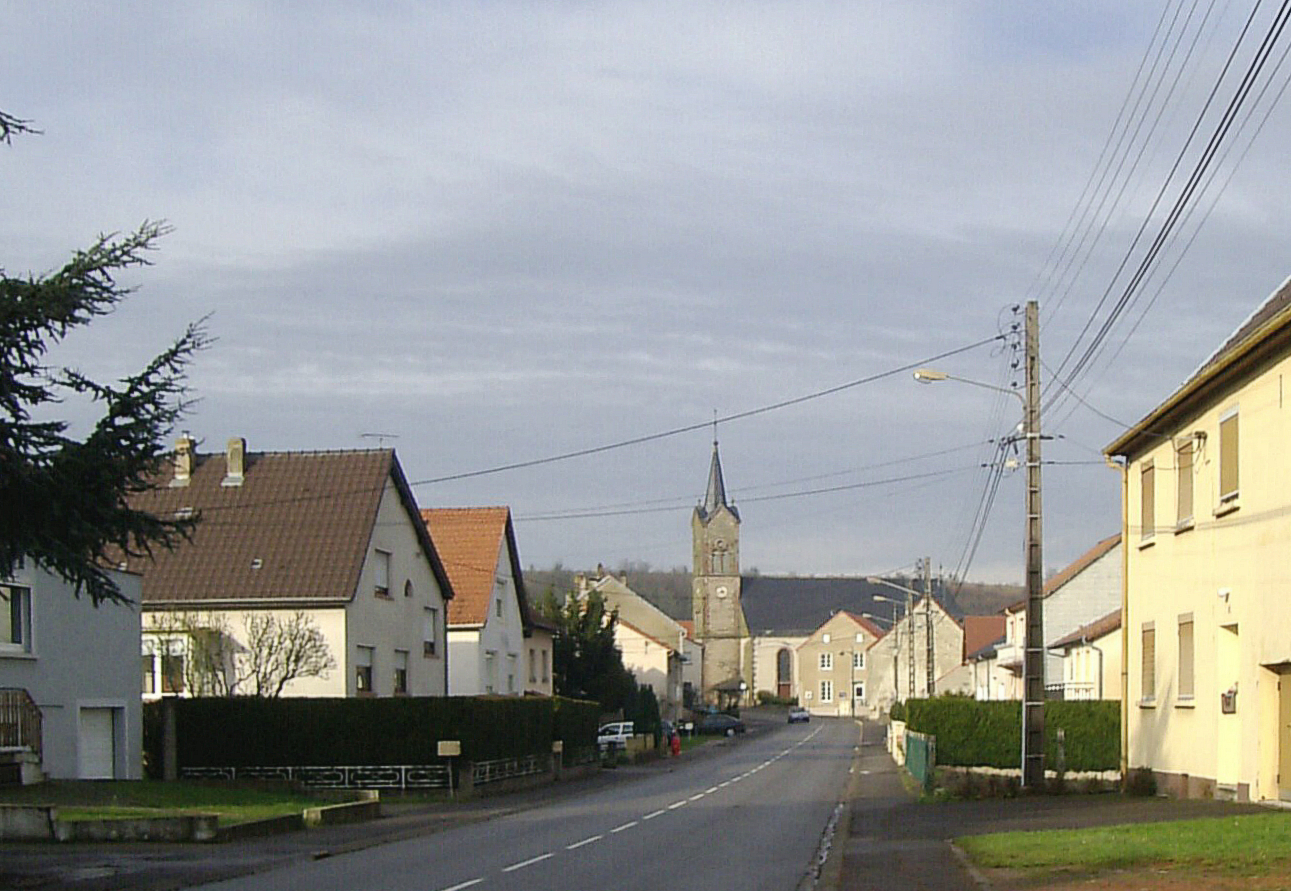
- The Rue de la Libération and church in Cappel

- Coat of arms
- Location of Cappel
- Location within France Location within Grand Est
- Coordinates: 49°04′23″N 6°51′02″E
- Country: France
- Region: Grand Est
- Department: Moselle
- Arrondissement: Forbach-Boulay-Moselle
- Canton: Freyming-Merlebach
- Intercommunality: Freyming-Merlebach

Government
  - Mayor (2020–2026): Hubert Bur
- Area^{1}: 5.97 km^{2} (2.31 sq mi)
- Elevation: 297 m (974 ft)
- Highest elevation: 301 m (988 ft)
- Lowest elevation: 232 m (761 ft)
- Population (2023): 676
  - Density: 113/km^{2} (293/sq mi)
- Time zone: UTC+01:00 (CET)
  - Summer (DST): UTC+02:00 (CEST)
- INSEE/Postal code: 57122 /57450
- ^{1} French Land Register data, which excludes lakes, ponds, glaciers > 1 km^{2} (0.386 sq mi or 247 acres) and river estuaries.

Cappel (French pronunciation: [kapɛl]) is a commune in the Moselle department in Grand Est in north-eastern France.

The village is situated on the N56 road.

== See also ==
- Communes of the Moselle department
