= Macheren =

- Commune
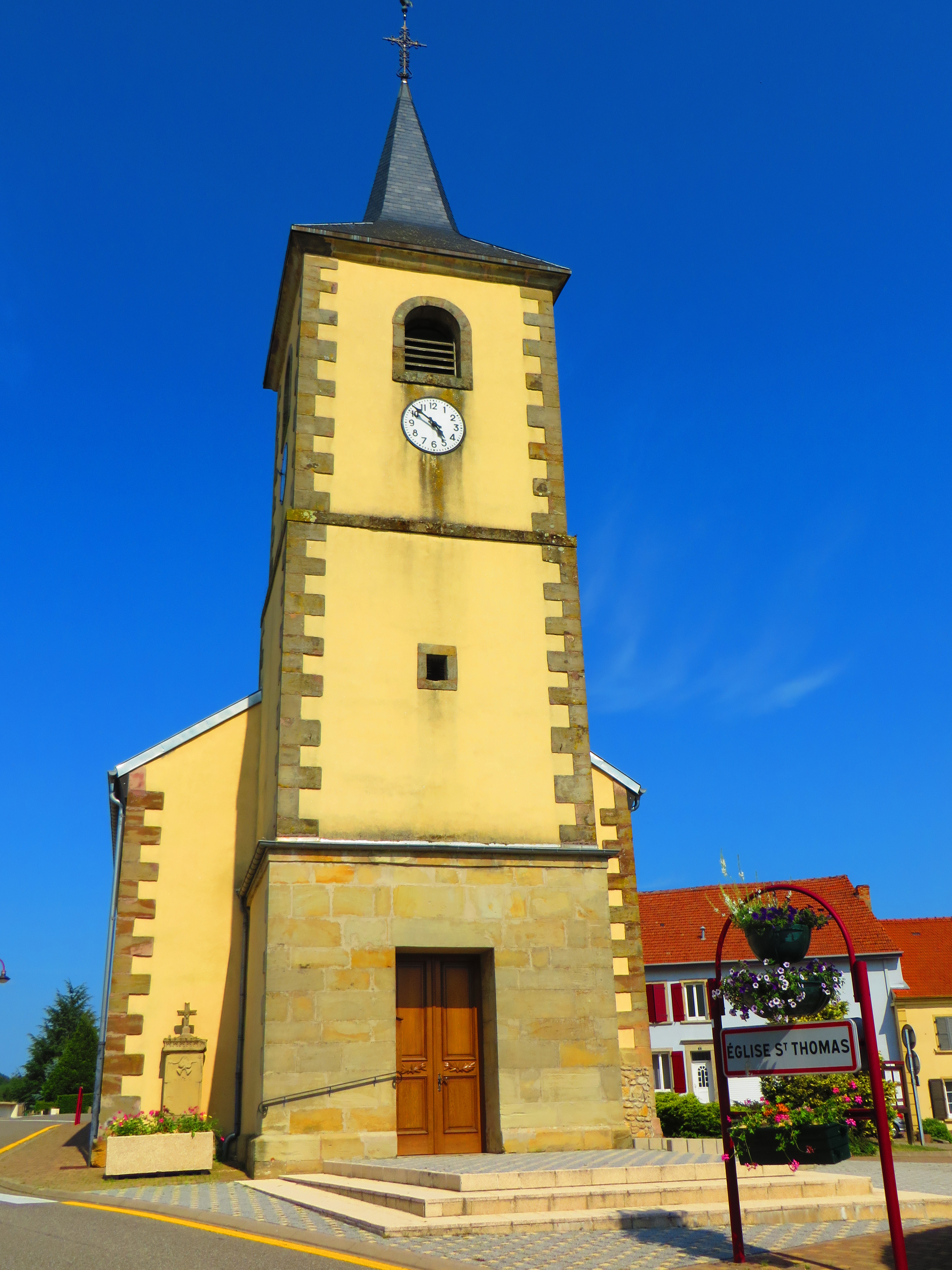
- The church in Macheren

- Coat of arms
- Location of Macheren
- Location within France Location within Grand Est
- Coordinates: 49°06′02″N 6°44′37″E
- Country: France
- Region: Grand Est
- Department: Moselle
- Arrondissement: Forbach-Boulay-Moselle
- Canton: Saint-Avold
- Intercommunality: CA Saint-Avold Synergie

Government
  - Mayor (2020–2026): Jean Meketyn
- Area^{1}: 16.95 km^{2} (6.54 sq mi)
- Elevation: 330 m (1,080 ft)
- Highest elevation: 332 m (1,089 ft)
- Lowest elevation: 217 m (712 ft)
- Population (2023): 2,814
  - Density: 166.0/km^{2} (430.0/sq mi)
- Time zone: UTC+01:00 (CET)
  - Summer (DST): UTC+02:00 (CEST)
- INSEE/Postal code: 57428 /57730
- ^{1} French Land Register data, which excludes lakes, ponds, glaciers > 1 km^{2} (0.386 sq mi or 247 acres) and river estuaries.

Macheren (French pronunciation: [maʃʁən]; German: Machern) is a commune in the Moselle department in the Grand Est region of north-eastern France.

The village is situated on the N56 road.

== Population ==
Historical population
Year	Pop.	±% p.a.
1968	1,842	—
1975	1,756	−0.68%
1982	2,063	+2.33%
1990	2,786	+3.83%
1999	2,809	+0.09%
2007	2,944	+0.59%
2012	2,891	−0.36%
2017	2,767	−0.87%
2023	2,814	+0.28%
Source: INSEE

== See also ==
- Communes of the Moselle department
