= Betting, Moselle =

Betting
- Commune
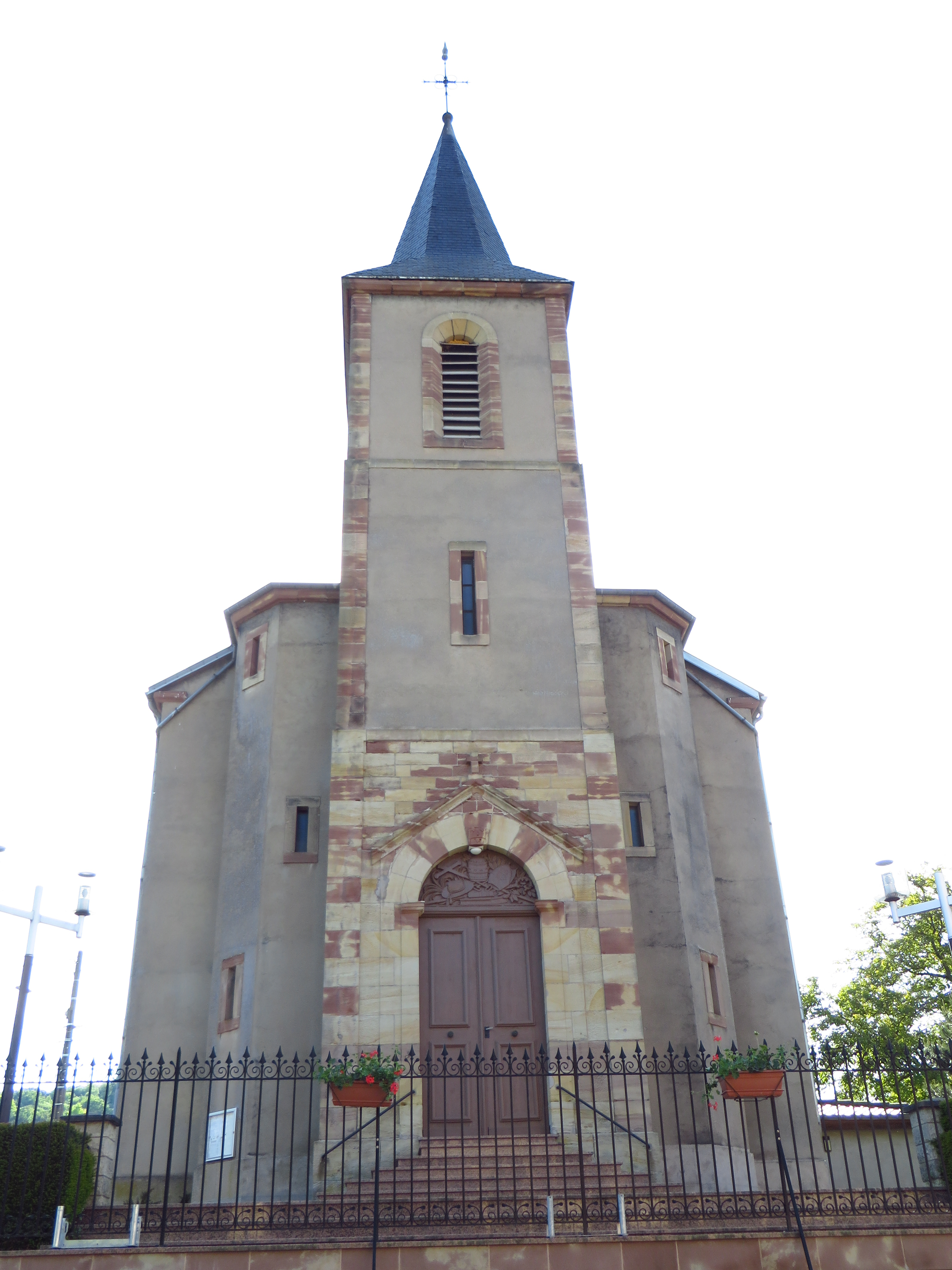
- The church in Betting

- Coat of arms
- Location of Betting
- Location within France Location within Grand Est
- Coordinates: 49°07′43″N 6°49′04″E
- Country: France
- Region: Grand Est
- Department: Moselle
- Arrondissement: Forbach-Boulay-Moselle
- Canton: Freyming-Merlebach
- Intercommunality: Freyming-Merlebach

Government
  - Mayor (2020–2026): Roland Rausch
- Area^{1}: 4.45 km^{2} (1.72 sq mi)
- Elevation: 280 m (920 ft)
- Highest elevation: 360 m (1,180 ft)
- Lowest elevation: 204 m (669 ft)
- Population (2023): 858
  - Density: 193/km^{2} (499/sq mi)
- Time zone: UTC+01:00 (CET)
  - Summer (DST): UTC+02:00 (CEST)
- INSEE/Postal code: 57073 /57800
- ^{1} French Land Register data, which excludes lakes, ponds, glaciers > 1 km^{2} (0.386 sq mi or 247 acres) and river estuaries.

Betting (French pronunciation: [bɛtɛ̃]; German: Bettingen) is a commune in the Moselle department in Grand Est in northeastern France.

Before 16 September 2005, Betting was known as Betting-lès-Saint-Avold.

== Population ==
Historical population
Year	Pop.	±% p.a.
1968	729	—
1975	791	+1.17%
1982	758	−0.61%
1990	808	+0.80%
1999	902	+1.23%
2007	889	−0.18%
2012	847	−0.96%
2017	882	+0.81%
2023	858	−0.46%
Source: INSEE

== See also ==
- Communes of the Moselle department
