= Sarralbe =

- Commune
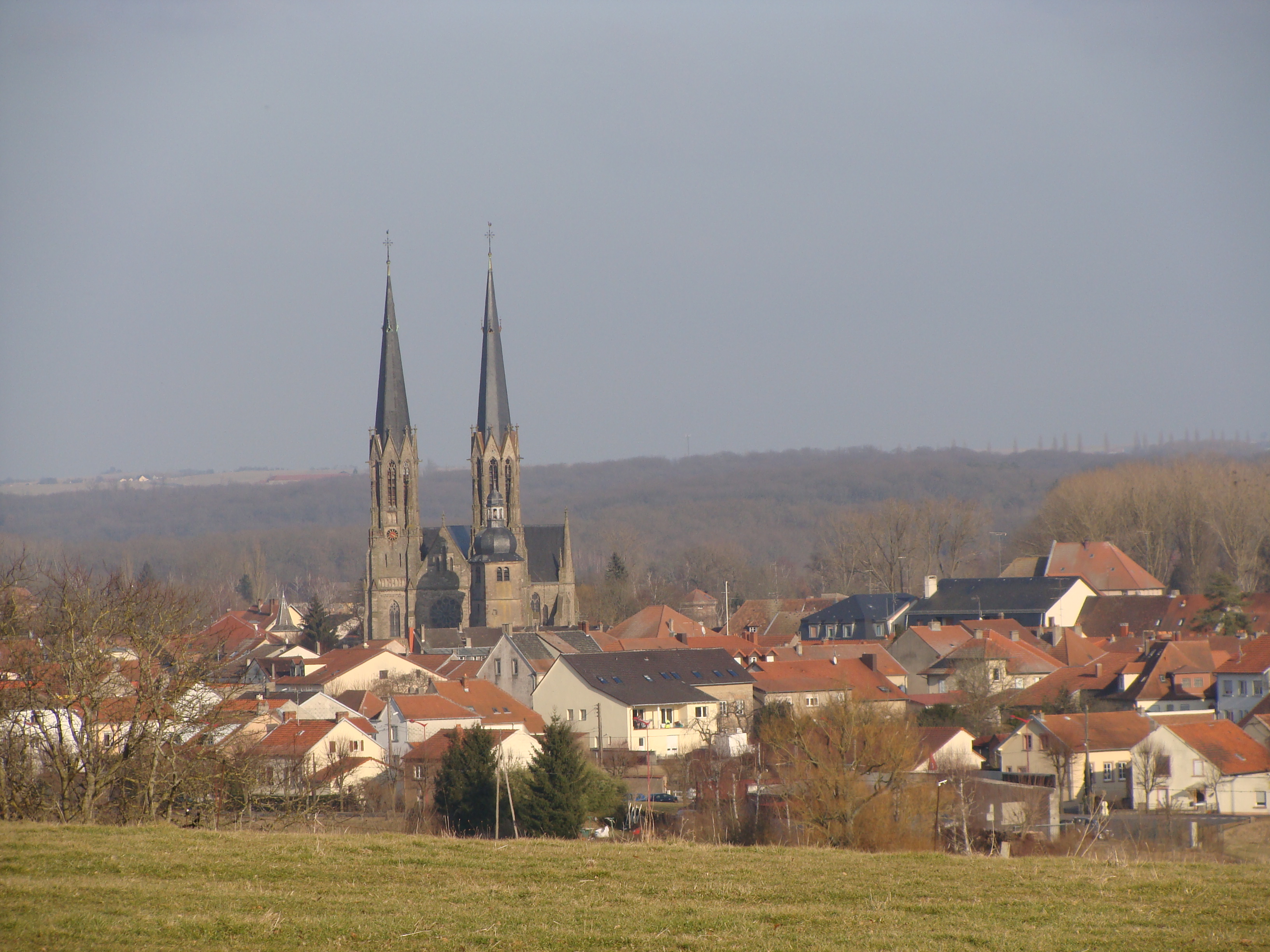
- A general view of Sarralbe

- Coat of arms
- Location of Sarralbe
- Location within France Location within Grand Est
- Coordinates: 49°00′N 7°02′E
- Country: France
- Region: Grand Est
- Department: Moselle
- Arrondissement: Sarreguemines
- Canton: Sarralbe
- Intercommunality: CA Sarreguemines Confluences

Government
  - Mayor (2020–2026): Pierre-Jean Didiot
- Area^{1}: 27.29 km^{2} (10.54 sq mi)
- Elevation: 210 m (690 ft)
- Highest elevation: 262 m (860 ft)
- Lowest elevation: 206 m (676 ft)
- Population (2023): 4,364
  - Density: 159.9/km^{2} (414.2/sq mi)
- Time zone: UTC+01:00 (CET)
  - Summer (DST): UTC+02:00 (CEST)
- INSEE/Postal code: 57628 /57430
- ^{1} French Land Register data, which excludes lakes, ponds, glaciers > 1 km^{2} (0.386 sq mi or 247 acres) and river estuaries.

Sarralbe (French pronunciation: [saʁalb]; German: Saaralben; Lorraine Franconian: Alwe or Saaralwe) is a commune in the Moselle department in Grand Est in north-eastern France.

== Population ==
Historical population
Year	Pop.	±% p.a.
1968	4,366	—
1975	4,600	+0.75%
1982	4,553	−0.15%
1990	4,487	−0.18%
1999	4,538	+0.13%
2007	4,613	+0.21%
2012	4,572	−0.18%
2017	4,555	−0.07%
2023	4,364	−0.71%
Source: INSEE

== See also ==
- Communes of the Moselle department
