= Kleebach =

River in Germany

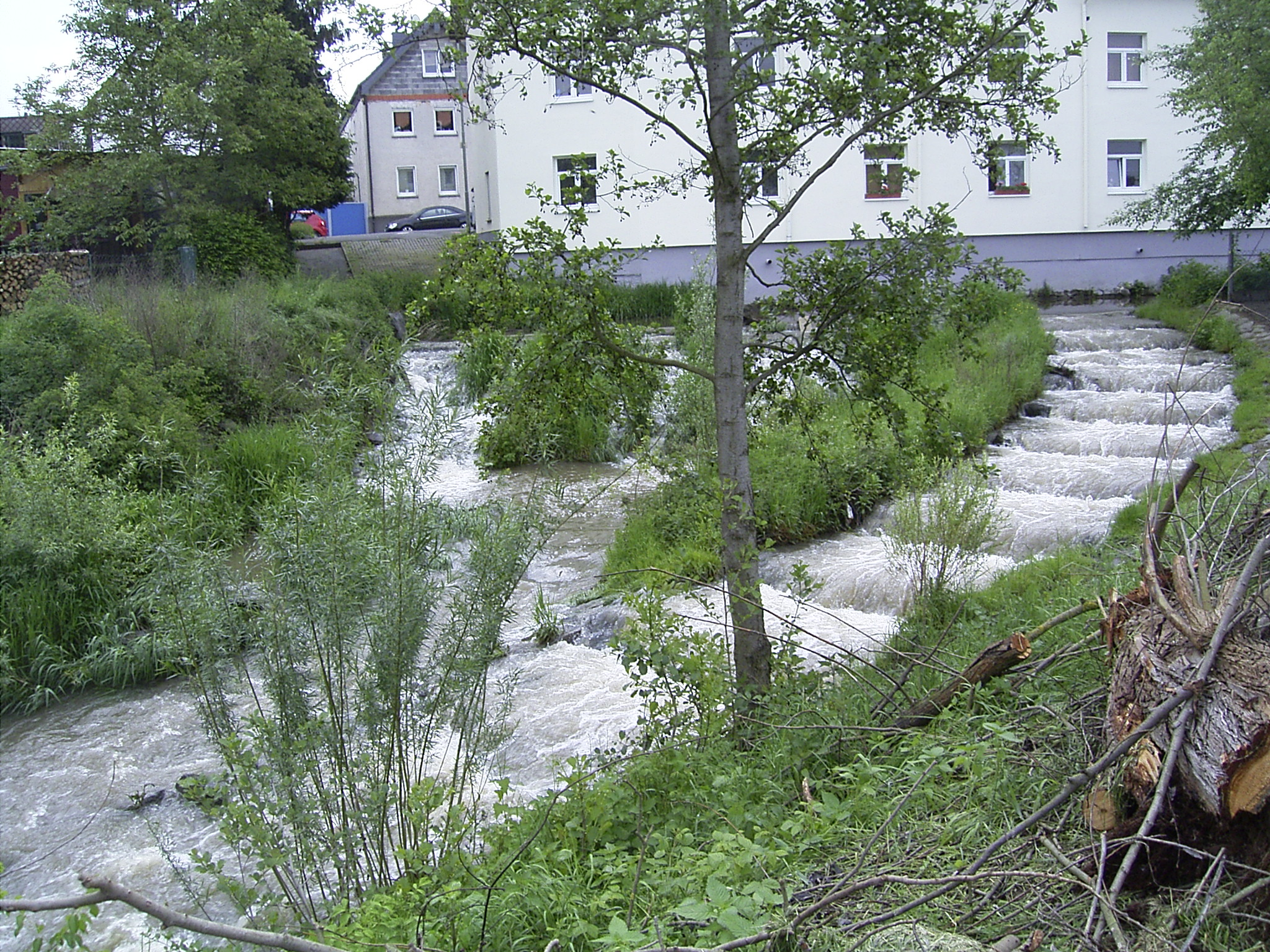
- Kleebach at Linden

- drainage

Location
- Country: Germany
- State: Hesse

Physical characteristics
- Mouth
  - location: Lahn
  - coordinates: 50.5699°N 8.6157°E
- Length: 26.8 km (16.7 mi)
- Basin size: 164 km^{2} (63 sq mi)

Basin features
- Progression: Lahn→ Rhine→ North Sea
- Tributaries
  - left: Schwingbach, Suhrbach, Brommbach, Forstbach
  - right: Dießenbach, Lückenbach, Reuß-Bach, Ebersgönser Bach

Kleebach (German pronunciation: [ˈkleːbax]) is a 27-kilometre-long (17 mi) left tributary of the Lahn river in central Hesse, Germany. It originates in the most Eastern part of the Hintertaunus mountains and from there it flows mostly in Northern direction towards the Lahn River. Along its course it flows through a string of small villages surrounded by forests and fields.

== See also ==
- List of rivers of Hesse
