= 2021 Hessian local elections =

Local Elections 2021 in Hesse, Germany

Local elections were held in the German state of Hesse on 14 March 2021 to elect district, municipal, and city councils and local boards, as well as mayors in some cities and district administrators in some districts. Indirect elections also took place for the Planning Board of the Frankfurt Rhein-Main Regional Authority and the regional councils of Hesse's three governing districts.

All EU citizens aged 18 or over on election day were eligible to vote if they had lived in a municipality for at least six weeks. Eligible voters who were not EU citizens could vote if they had lived in a municipality for at least three months.

== Election date ==
Local elections take place every five years in Hesse. The election date of 14 March 2021 was set by the state government on 18 May 2020.

Direct elections for a number of mayors and district administrators were originally scheduled to take place between April and October 2020. Due to the COVID-19 pandemic in Germany, these were postponed on 24 March 2020 by the Hessian state parliament, and were scheduled to take place on 1 November 2021 at the earliest. However, city and district councils were permitted to hold alongside the regular local elections if they choose to do so. As a result, the district administrators of Bergstraße, Odenwaldkreis, Schwalm-Eder-Kreis, Kassel, and Hersfeld-Rotenburg and the mayors of Hanau, Bad Homburg vor der Höhe, Fulda, Marburg, and Wetzlar were elected alongside the local elections on 14 March 2021, with runoffs held as necessary.

== Electoral system ==
Bodies with multiple members, such as councils, are elected via proportional representation using panachage. Voters have as many votes as there are seats up for election, which may be cast for candidates in lists. Voters may cast up to three votes for any given candidate, and may cast votes for candidates from multiple lists. Elections to a single position, such as mayors and district administrators, are conducted via the two-round system.

== Size of councils ==
The number of members on each district and city/municipal council is determined by the number of residents it serves. For the 2021 elections, figures released by the Hessian State Statistical Office in September 2015 were used. The number of seats on local boards are determined by the statutes of the respective city or municipality. Local boards must comprise between three and nine members, unless the board serves over 8,000 people, in which case it may have up to nineteen members.

District councils		City/municipal councils	
Residents	Seats	Residents	Seats
under 100,000	51	under 3,000	15
100,001–150,000	61	3,001–5,000	23
150,001–200,000	71	5,001–10,000	31
200,001–300,000	81	10,001–25,000	37
300,001–400,000	87	25,001–50,000	45
over 400,000	93	50,001–100,000	59
		100,001–250,000	71
		250,001–500,000	81
		500,001–1,000,000	93
		over 1,000,000	105

== Background and parties ==
The table below lists the results of the 2016 local elections in the rural districts and the urban districts.

Name		Ideology	2016 result	
Name		Ideology	Votes (%)	Seats
CDU	Christian Democratic Union of Germany	Christian democracy	28.9%	554 / 1,920
SPD	Social Democratic Party of Germany	Social democracy	28.5%	554 / 1,920
AfD	Alternative for Germany	Right-wing populism	11.9%	223 / 1,920
Grüne	Alliance 90/The Greens	Green politics	11.3%	217 / 1,920
WG	Voter Groups	Localism	7.4%	142 / 1,920
FDP	Free Democratic Party	Classical liberalism	6.4%	120 / 1,920
Linke	The Left	Democratic socialism	3.5%	68 / 1,920
Others		–	2.1%	42 / 1,920

== Results ==
Party	Votes	%	Swing	Seats	+/-
Christian Democratic Union of Germany (CDU)	658,826	28.5	▼0.4	545	▼9
Social Democratic Party of Germany (SPD)	555,528	24.0	▼4.5	475	▼79
Alliance 90/The Greens (GRÜNE)	426,331	18.4	▲7.1	343	▲126
Alternative for Germany (AfD)	160,246	6.9	▼5.0	132	▼91
Free Democratic Party (FDP)	155,240	6.7	▲0.3	123	▲3
Voter Groups (WG)	136,236	5.9	▼1.5	115	▼27
The Left (LINKE)	92,613	4.0	▲0.5	77	▲9
Free Voters (FW)	76,633	3.3	▲2.7	67	▲51
Die PARTEI	21,935	0.9	▲0.8	19	▲18
Volt Germany (Volt)	18,903	0.8	New	18	New
Pirate Party Germany (Piraten)	4,499	0.2	▼0.5	4	▼9
Alliance for Innovation and Justice (BIG)	2,421	0.1	New	3	New
National Democratic Party of Germany (NPD)	1,797	0.1	▼0.2	2	▼3
Alliance C – Christians for Germany (Bündnis C)	746	0.0	New	3	New
Others	1,794	0.1	▲0.1	0	▼7
Total	2,313,748	100.0		1,920	
Blank/invalid votes	96,004	4.0			
Registered voters/turnout	4,773,570	50.4	▲2.5		
Source: Statistics Hesse

=== Results in independent cities ===
City	CDU	SPD	Grüne	AfD	FDP	Linke	FW	PARTEI	Volt	WG	Others
Frankfurt am Main	21.9	17.0	24.6	4.5	7.6	7.9	0.8	1.8	3.7	6.5	3.7
Wiesbaden	23.5	20.3	21.4	6.5	10.4	6.2	2.5	0.8	3.8	3.5	1.1
Kassel	19.2	24.6	28.7	5.6	5.6	11.2	2.3	1.0	–	1.9	–
Darmstadt	15.6	16.7	27.4	4.6	5.6	7.4	1.9	2.1	6.9	11.8	–
Offenbach am Main	18.1	28.4	18.1	7.3	6.2	8.5	4.2	1.6	–	4.0	3.5
