= Pierre Lang =

French politician

Pierre Lang (born 13 June 1947 in Creutzwald) is a member of the National Assembly of France. He represents the Moselle department, and is a member of the Union for a Popular Movement.
