= Rossel (Saar) =

River in Germany

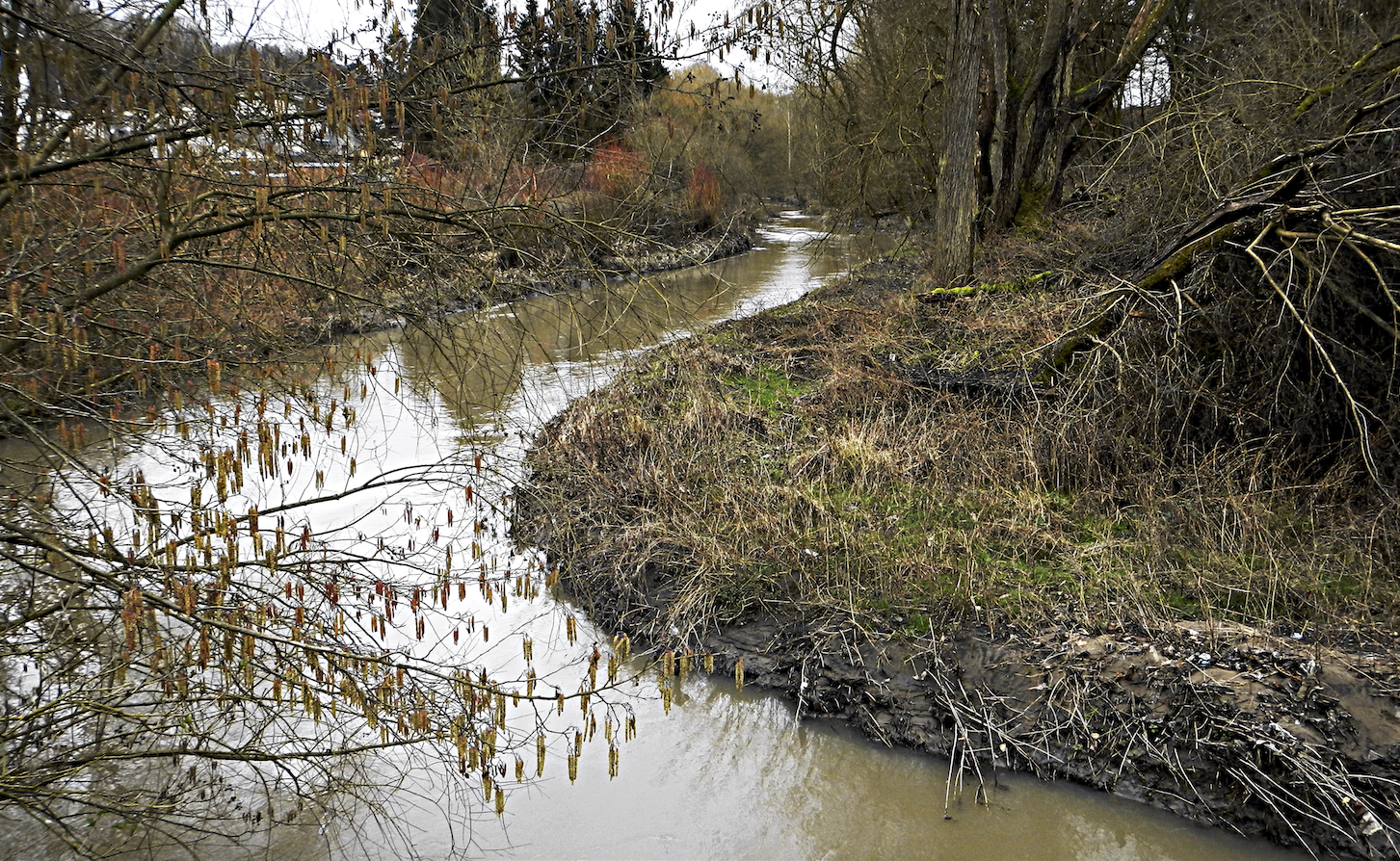

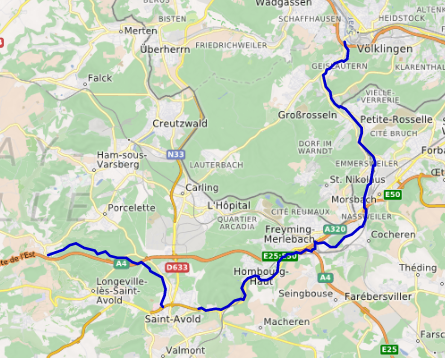
- Course of the Rosselle

Location
- Countries: France and Germany
- Region: Grand Est
- State: Saarland

Physical characteristics
- Source
  - location: 49°08′16″N 6°36′36″E
  - elevation: 309 m (1,014 ft)
- Mouth
  - location: Saar
  - coordinates: 49.2458°N 6.8397°E
  - elevation: 196 m (643 ft)
- Length: 38 km (24 mi)

Basin features
- Progression: Saar→ Moselle→ Rhine→ North Sea

Rossel (French: Rosselle; German: Rossel) is a river flowing on the border of the department of Moselle (France) and Saarland (Germany). It rises in Longeville-les-Saint-Avold near the border of France and Germany and flows northwards into the Saar near Völklingen. Its course within France and on the French-German border is 32.8 km (20.4 mi) long.

Towns along the Rossel are:

- in France: Longeville-lès-Saint-Avold, Boucheporn, Saint-Avold, Macheren, Betting, Hombourg-Haut, Freyming-Merlebach, Béning-lès-Saint-Avold, Cocheren, Rosbruck, Morsbach, Forbach, Petite-Rosselle
- in Germany: Großrosseln, Völklingen and Saarbrücken

== See also ==
- List of rivers of Saarland
