= Naßweiler =

- Ortsteil of Großrosseln
- Coat of arms
- Interactive map of Naßweiler
- Location within Germany Location within Saarland
- Coordinates: 49°09′35″N 06°50′31″E
- Country: Germany
- State: Saarland
- District: Saarbrücken
- Municipality: Großrosseln
- Time zone: UTC+01:00 (CET)
  - Summer (DST): UTC+02:00 (CEST)
- Postal codes: 66352
- Dialling codes: 06809
- Vehicle registration: SB

Naßweiler (Nassweiler) is an Ortsteil of the German municipality of Großrosseln in the Saarland, directly on the German-French border.

== Geography ==
Naßweiler is located south-east of the Warndt forest. On the French side, Merlebach, Rosbruck and Cocheren abut on Naßweiler.

== History ==
Naßweiler was founded in the year 1608. After 1974 Naßweiler ceased to be a separate municipality, but a part of Großrosseln. There is an existing partnership with Rosbruck since 1992, which is also marked with a monument.

== Gallery ==
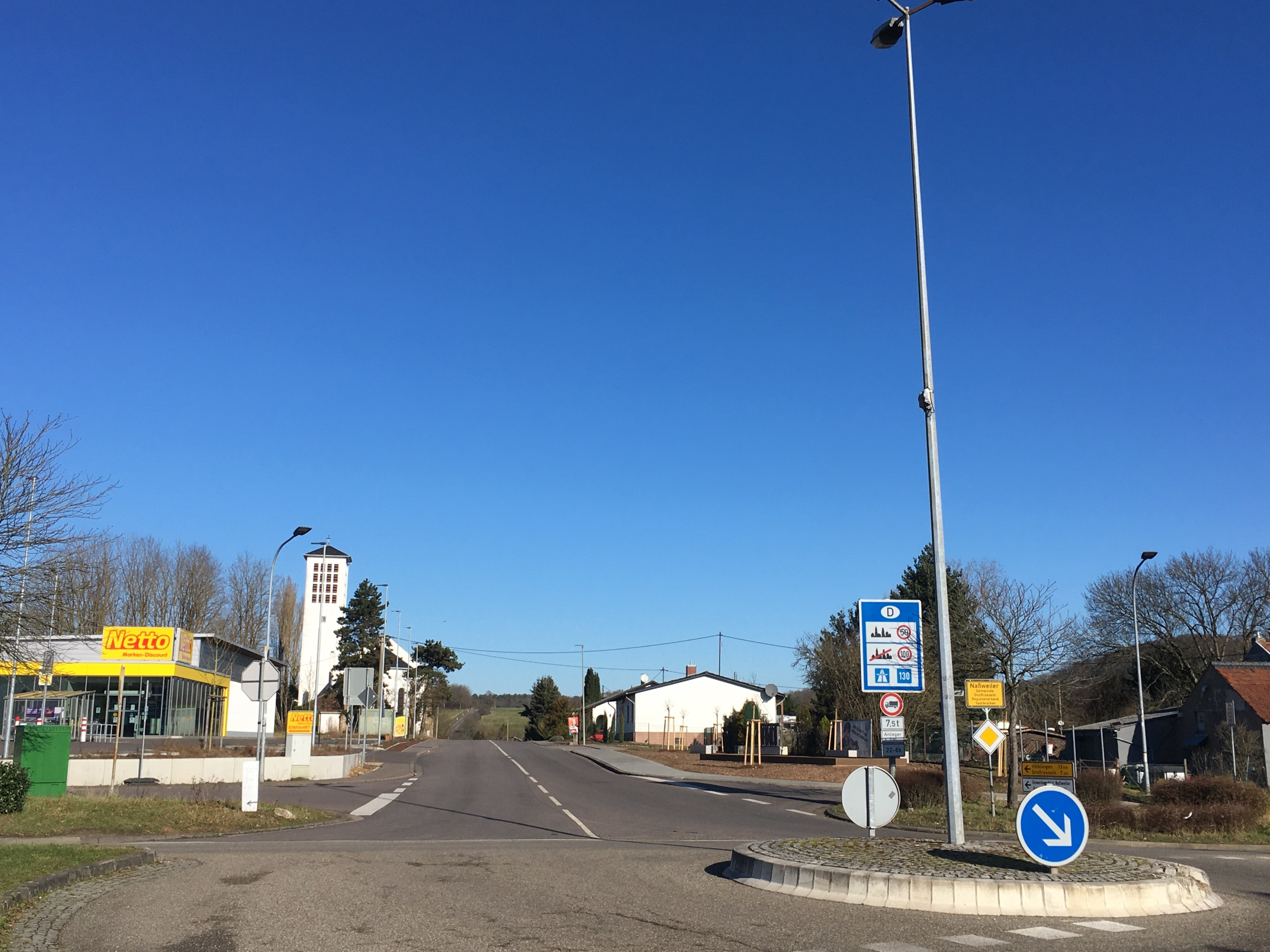
Entering Naßweiler from Rosbruck.

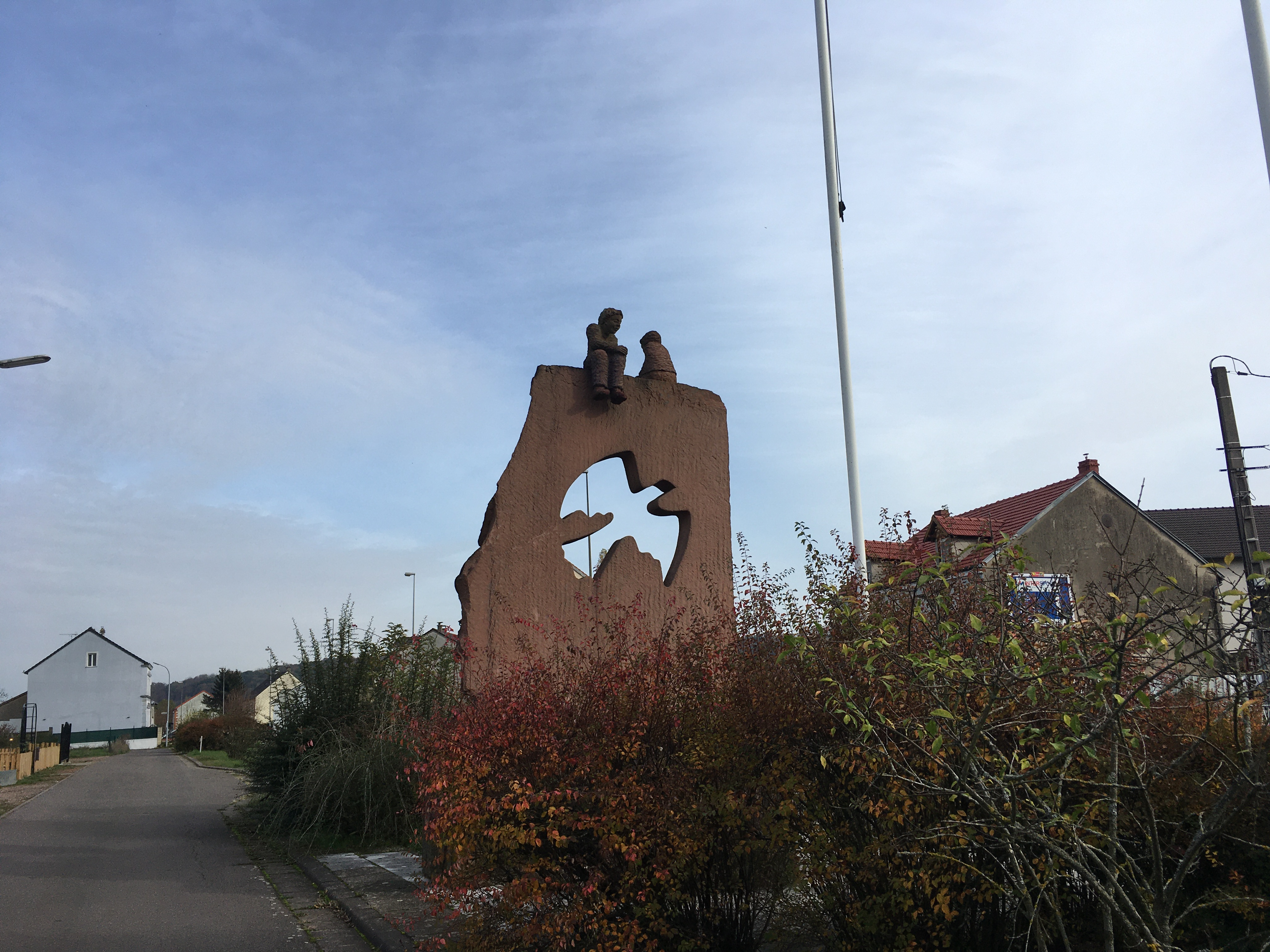
Monument to the partnership between Naßweiler and Rosbruck.

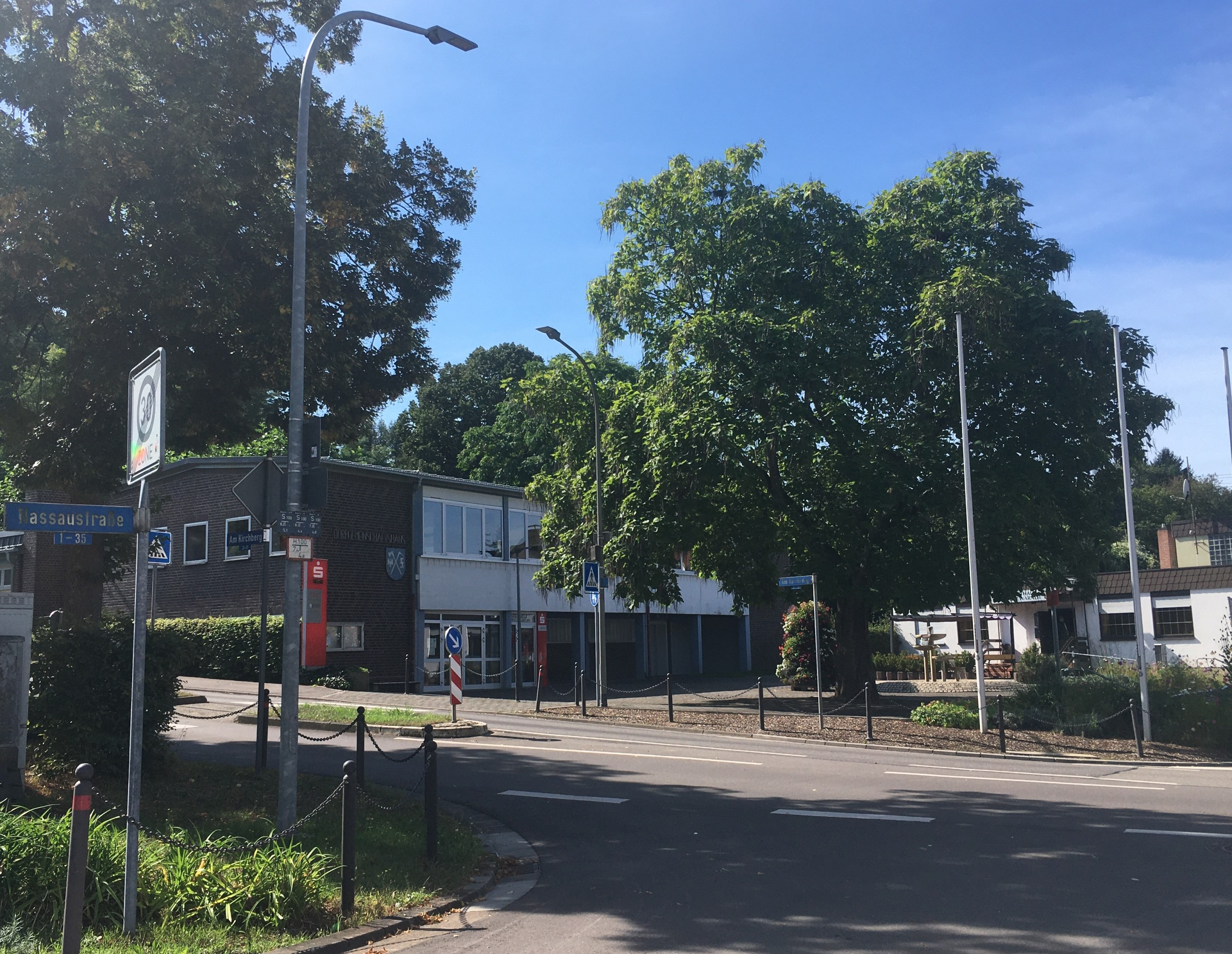
Village hall.

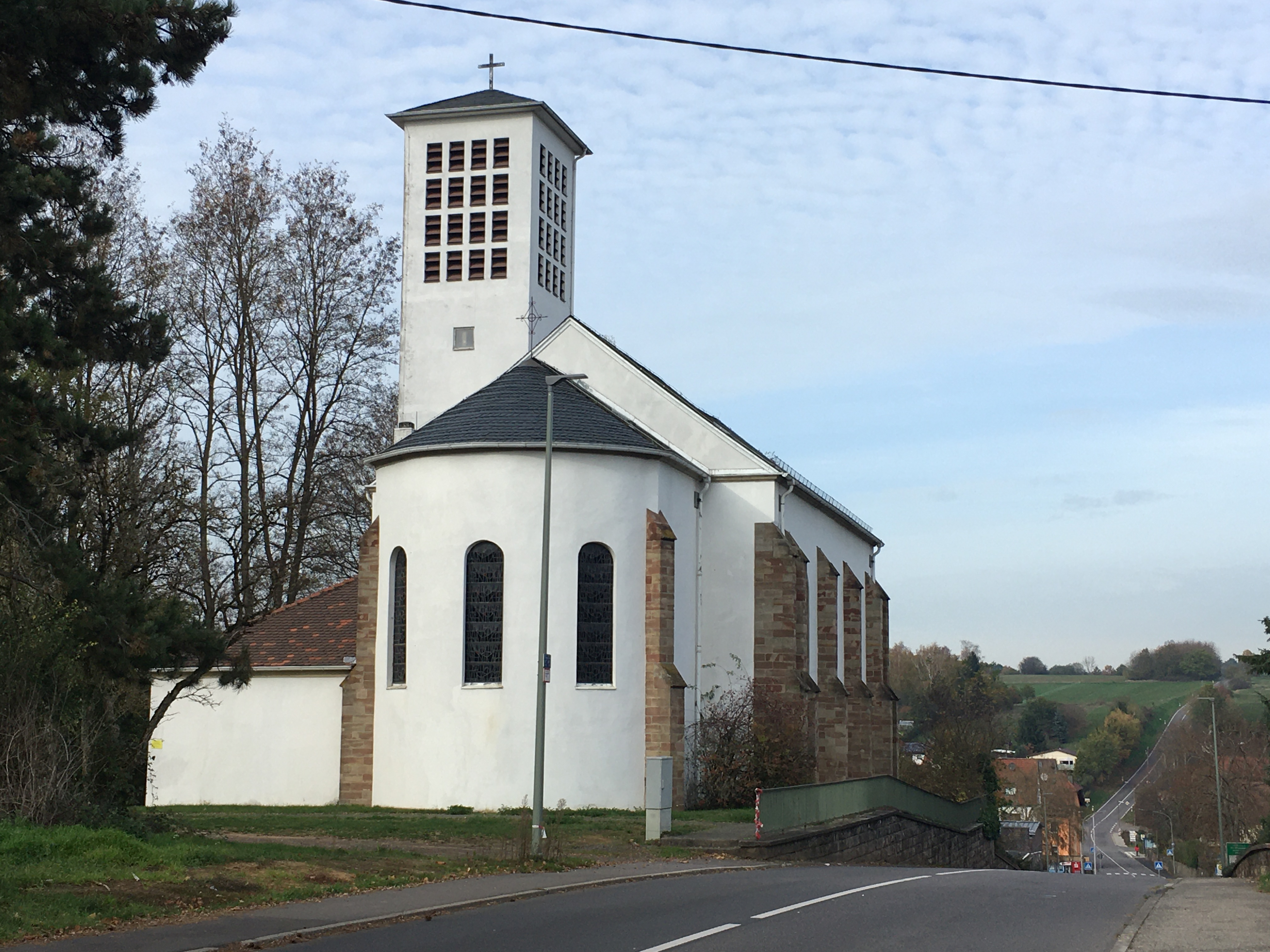
Catholic church.

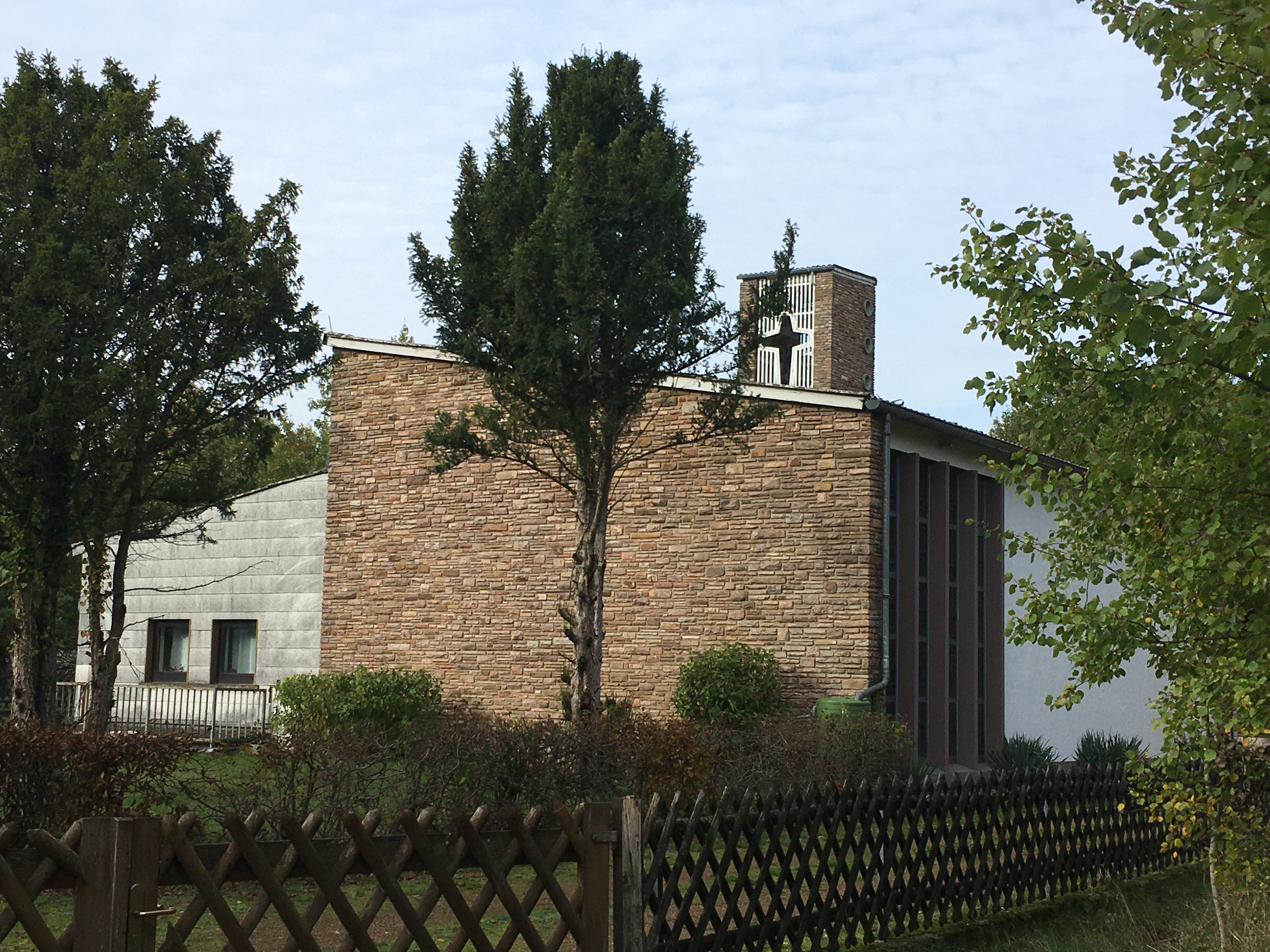
Former Protestant church.

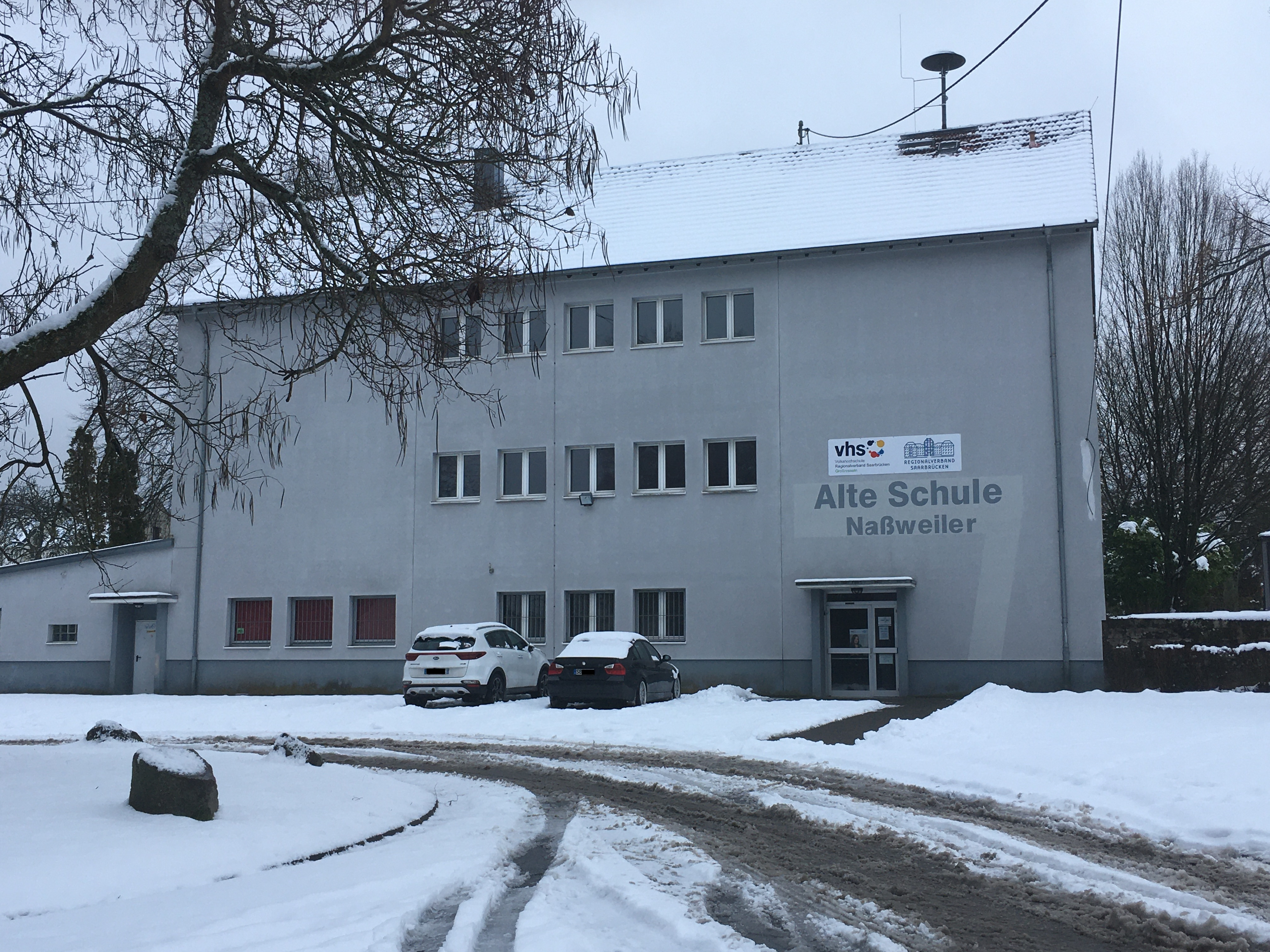
VHS centre Naßweiler.

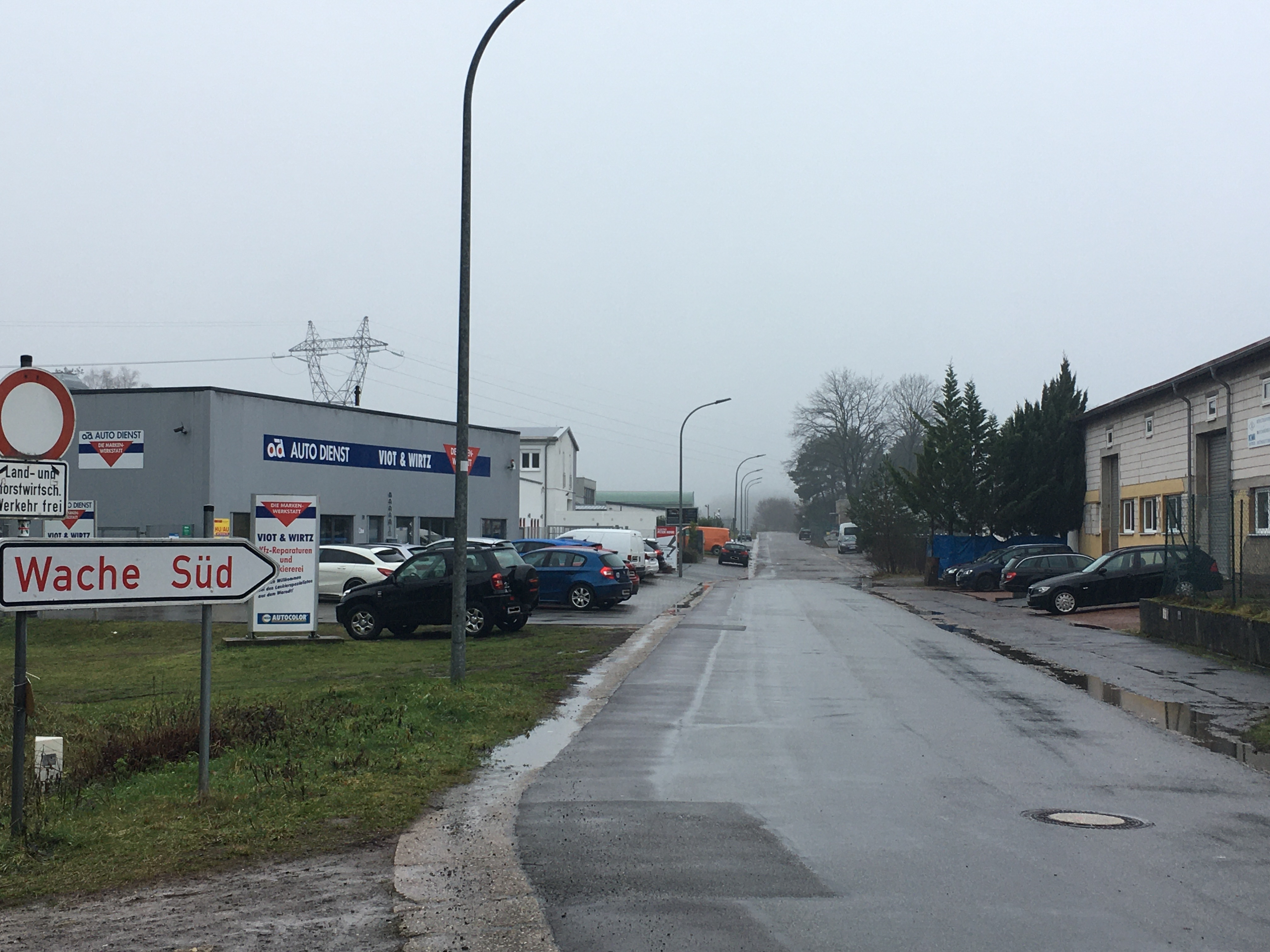
Industrial zone "Am Hirschelheck" Naßweiler.

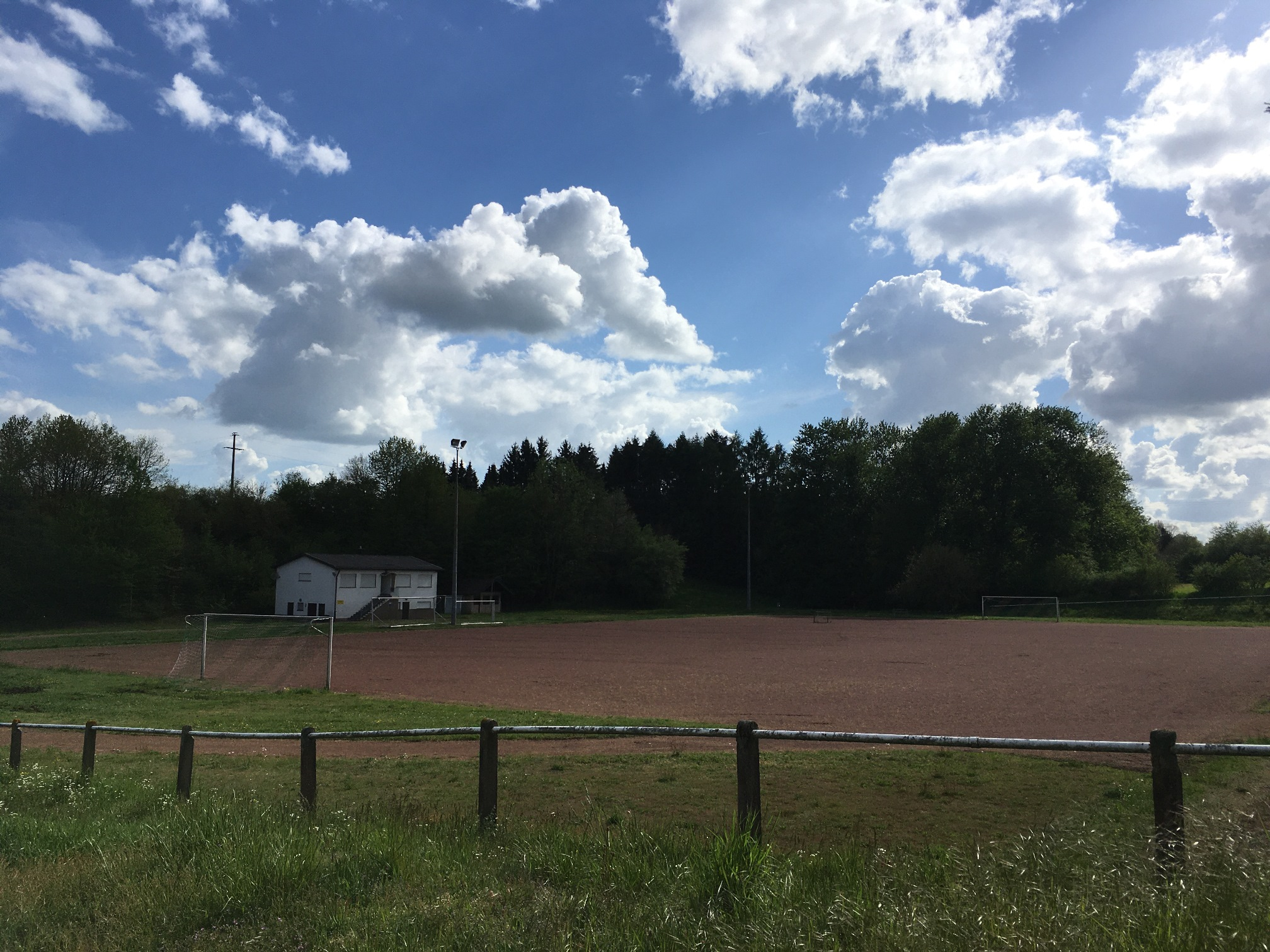
Sports field Naßweiler.

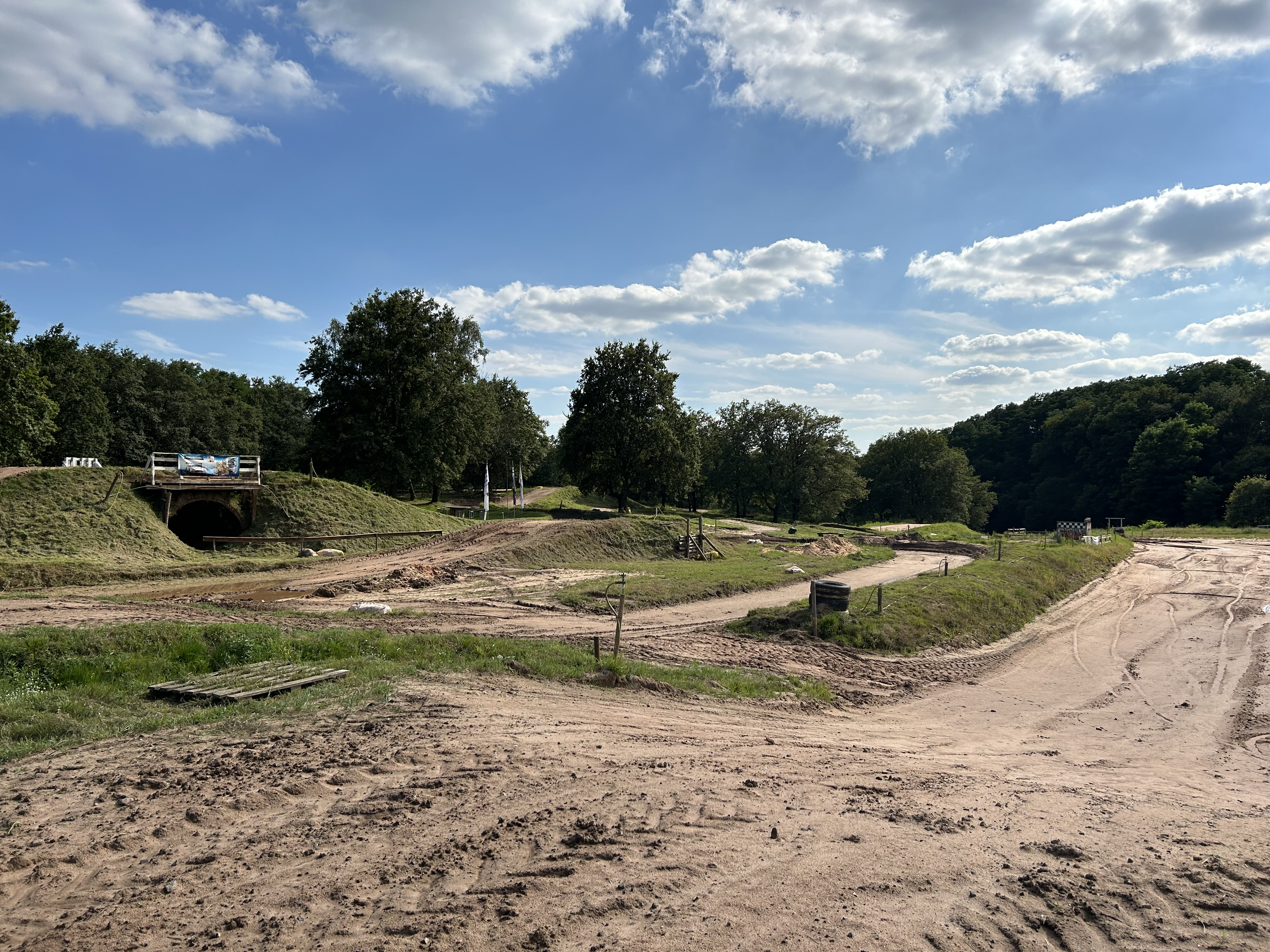
Moto-cross circuit.

== Infrastructure ==
The following institutions are found in Naßweiler:

- Supermarket
- Snack shop
- Industrial zone "Am Hirschelheck"
- Farm shop with its own cheesery (Birkenhof)
- Pferde-Ziegenalm
- VHS centre
- Daycare centre for old people
- Since 1960 - Carnival association "Hinne-Hott"
- Moto-cross
- Naßweiler-Südwarndt Canine association
- Sports clubs: SV Naßweiler / TV Naßweiler

== Politics ==
Hans-Werner Franzen of the Social Democratic Party of Germany was the municipal administrator from 1984 to 2024. Since July 2024, it is Jana Hector of the Christian Democratic Union of Germany.
