= Warndt =

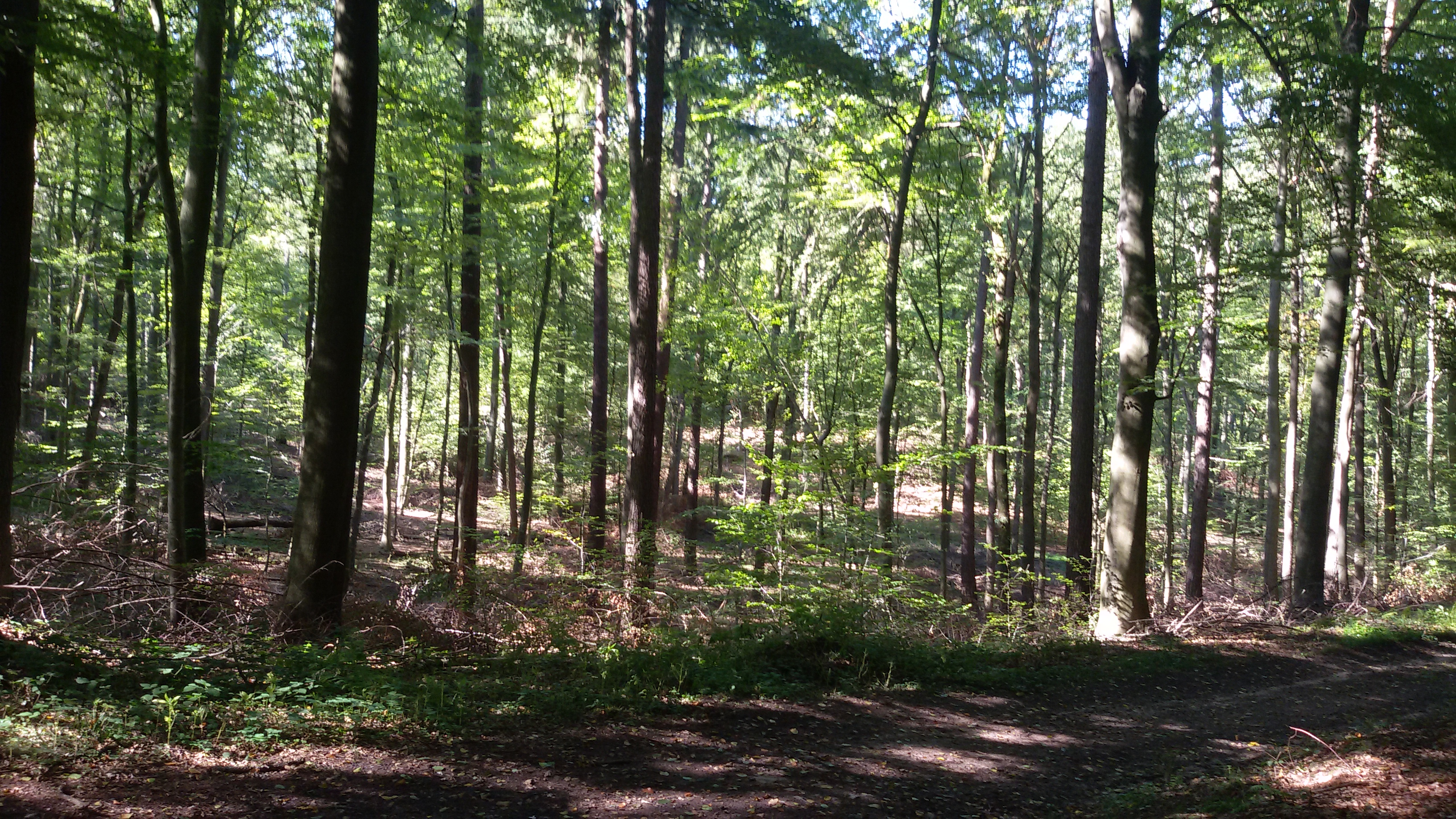

- Location within Saarland
- Interactive map of Warndt

Geography
- Location: Saar Basin, Germany, France
- Coordinates: 49°11′50.6″N 6°45′58.1″E
- Elevation: 251 metres (823 ft)
- Area: 5,000 hectares (19 sq mi)

The Warndt (French pronunciation: [vaʁnt]) is an extensive forest area of approximately 5,000 hectares (19 sq mi) including parts of the German Saarland and the French region Grand Est west of Saarbrücken. The geology of the Warndt is composed of Buntsandstein permeated by veins of iron ore and deposits of hard coal. Today it is a popular recreational area.

The area is bounded by the Saar and two of its left tributaries, the Bist in the north and the Rossel in the south. It is transected by the Lauterbach, which flows into the Rossel in Geislautern. The name Warndt first appears in a deed of donation from 999AD of the Emperor Otto III.

Off-limits to the general population, the Warndt had been a lordly hunting ground since the Middle Ages. Prince Ludwig of Nassau-Saarbrücken had a hunting lodge built at Karlsbrunn in 1717 and used it frequently for large hunts, often lasting several days. In 1815 the state forestry administration moved into the estate. In the 17th century, the Warndt was a refuge for French Huguenots. Their settlements in the Warndt, in Ludweiler, caused a lasting effect on the area, since they brought the craft of glassblowing and introduced the glass industry to the Saar. The abundance of wood in the Warndt was used to fire the glassworks. Coal mining ended in mid-2005. The art of glassblowing can now be seen in the demonstration factory of Villeroy & Boch in Wadgassen.

== Places in the Warndt region ==
- Germany (21): Differten, Dorf im Warndt, Emmersweiler, Fenne, Friedrichweiler, Fürstenhausen, Geislautern, Gersweiler, Großrosseln, Hostenbach, Karlsbrunn, Klarenthal, Lauterbach, Ludweiler-Warndt, Naßweiler, Schaffhausen, St. Nikolaus, Überherrn, Wadgassen, Wehrden, Werbeln
- France (26): Béning-lès-Saint-Avold, Betting, Bisten-en-Lorraine, Carling, Cocheren, Creutzwald, Dalem, Diesen, Falck, Forbach, Freyming-Merlebach, Guerting, Ham-sous-Varsberg, Hargarten-aux-Mines, Hombourg-Haut, L’Hôpital, Longeville-lès-Saint-Avold, Merten, Morsbach, Macheren, Petite-Rosselle, Porcelette, Rosbruck, Saint-Avold, Schœneck, Varsberg.

== Industry in the Warndt ==
- Former cross-border anthracite mining area
- Former smelters and glassworks
- Grube Velsen mine
- Bergwerk Warndt mine
