= Karlsbrunn =

- Ortsteil of Großrosseln
- Coat of arms
- Interactive map of Karlsbrunn
- Location within Germany Location within Saarland
- Coordinates: 49°10′00″N 06°49′00″E
- Country: Germany
- State: Saarland
- District: Saarbrücken
- Municipality: Großrosseln
- Elevation: 240 m (790 ft)

Population (2011)
  - Total: 960
- Demonym: Karlsbrunner
- Time zone: UTC+01:00 (CET)
  - Summer (DST): UTC+02:00 (CEST)
- Postal codes: 66352
- Dialling codes: 06809
- Vehicle registration: SB

Karlsbrunn is a German village that is part of the municipality of Großrosseln. It is situated in the district of Saarbrücken, which is part of the federal state of Saarland. Its population is about 1,000 inhabitants.

== Geography ==
The village lies in the urban area of Saarbrücken, 5 km south of Großrosseln and close to the frontier with France (near the department of Moselle in Lorraine). The nearest French municipalities are Rosbruck, Forbach and Freyming-Merlebach.

== Link to Dwight D. Eisenhower ==
The town is the ancestral home of the family of American president Dwight D. Eisenhower. The Eisenhauer (German for "iron hewer/miner") family migrated from Karlsbrunn to North America in 1741, first settling in York, Pennsylvania. Accounts vary as to how and when the German name Eisenhauer was anglicized to Eisenhower. President Eisenhower's Pennsylvania Dutch ancestors, who were primarily farmers, included Hans Nikolaus Eisenhauer of Karlsbrunn, who migrated to Lancaster, Pennsylvania, in 1741.

== Gallery ==
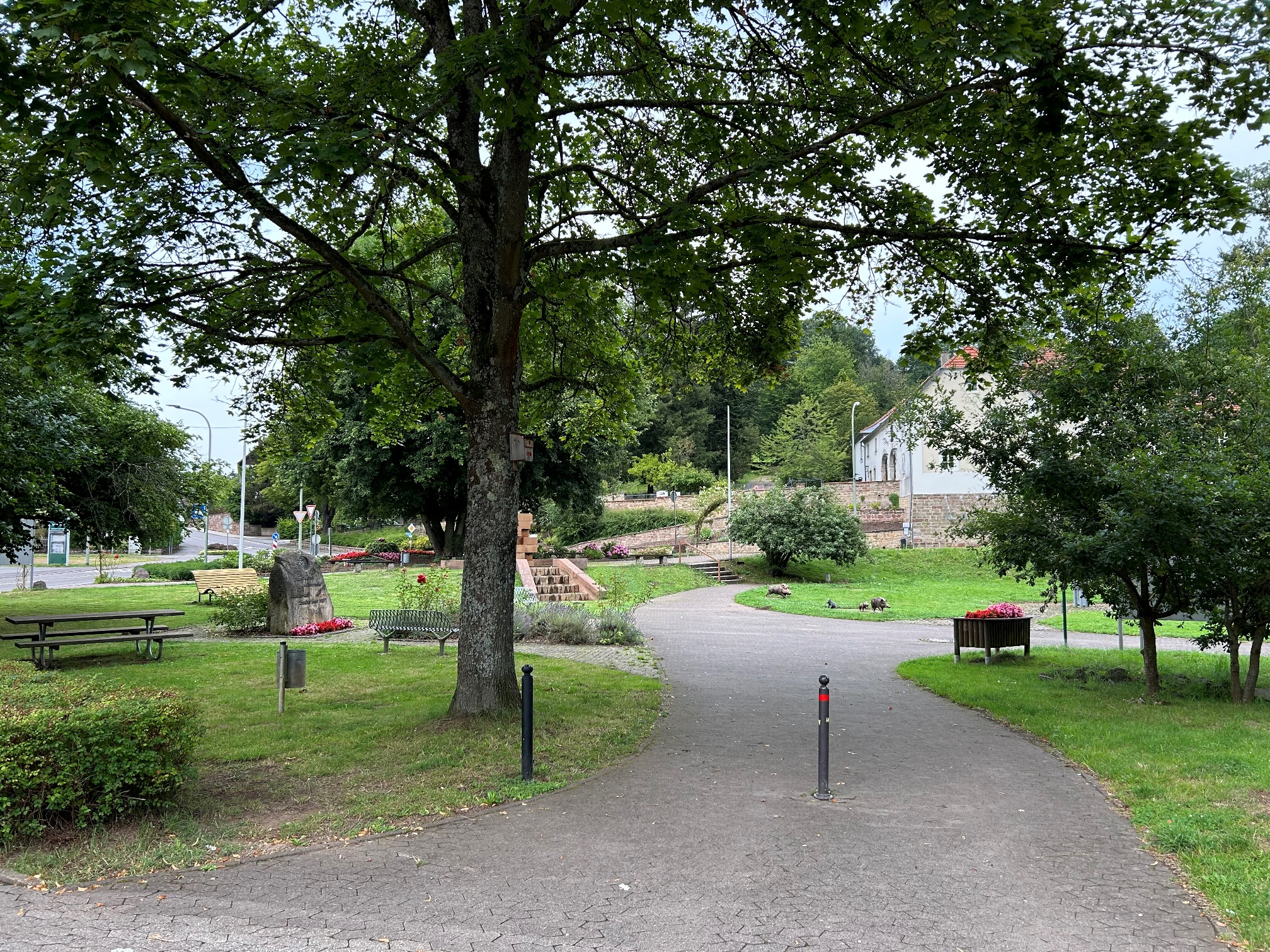
Centre

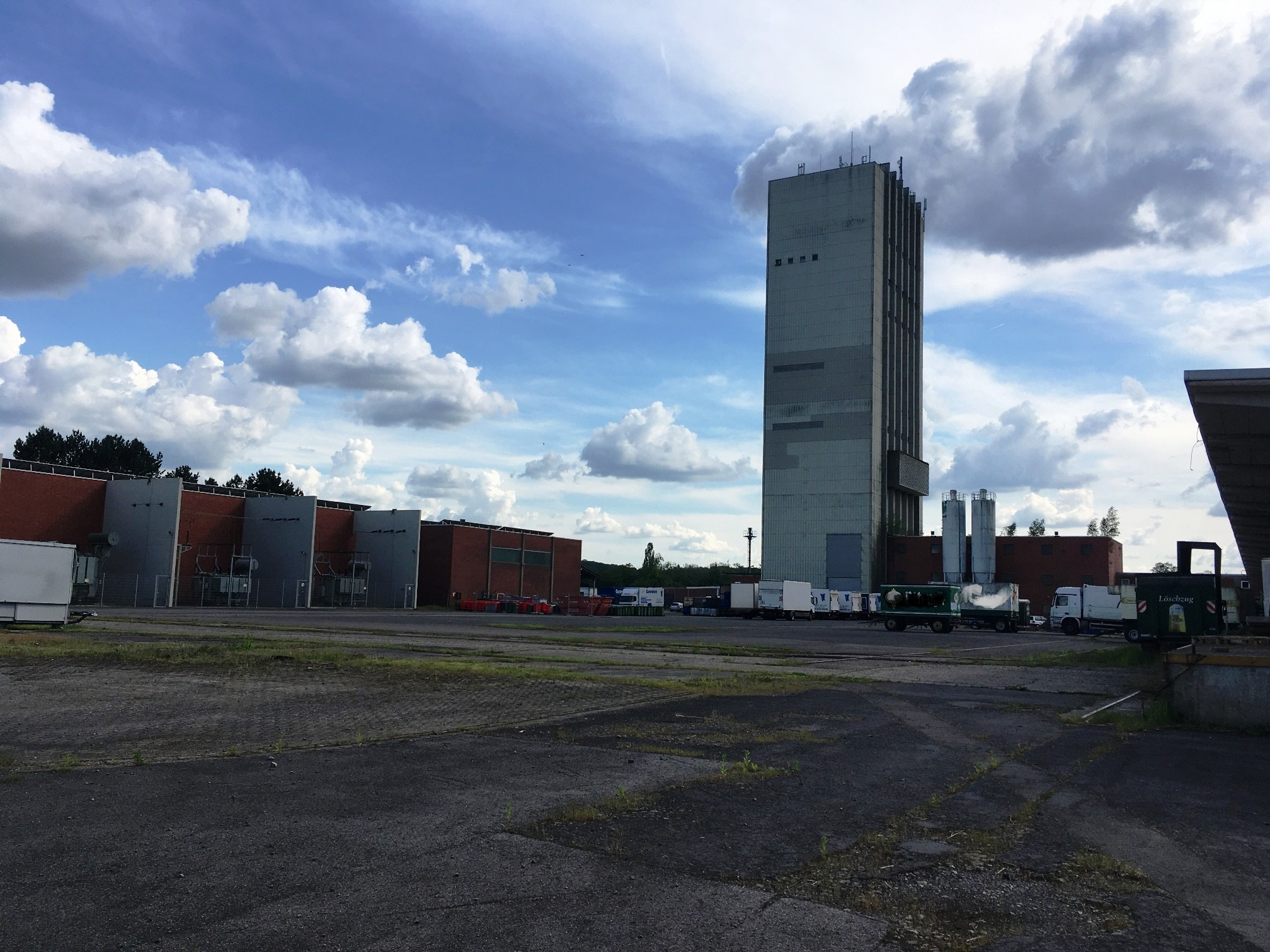
Old mine

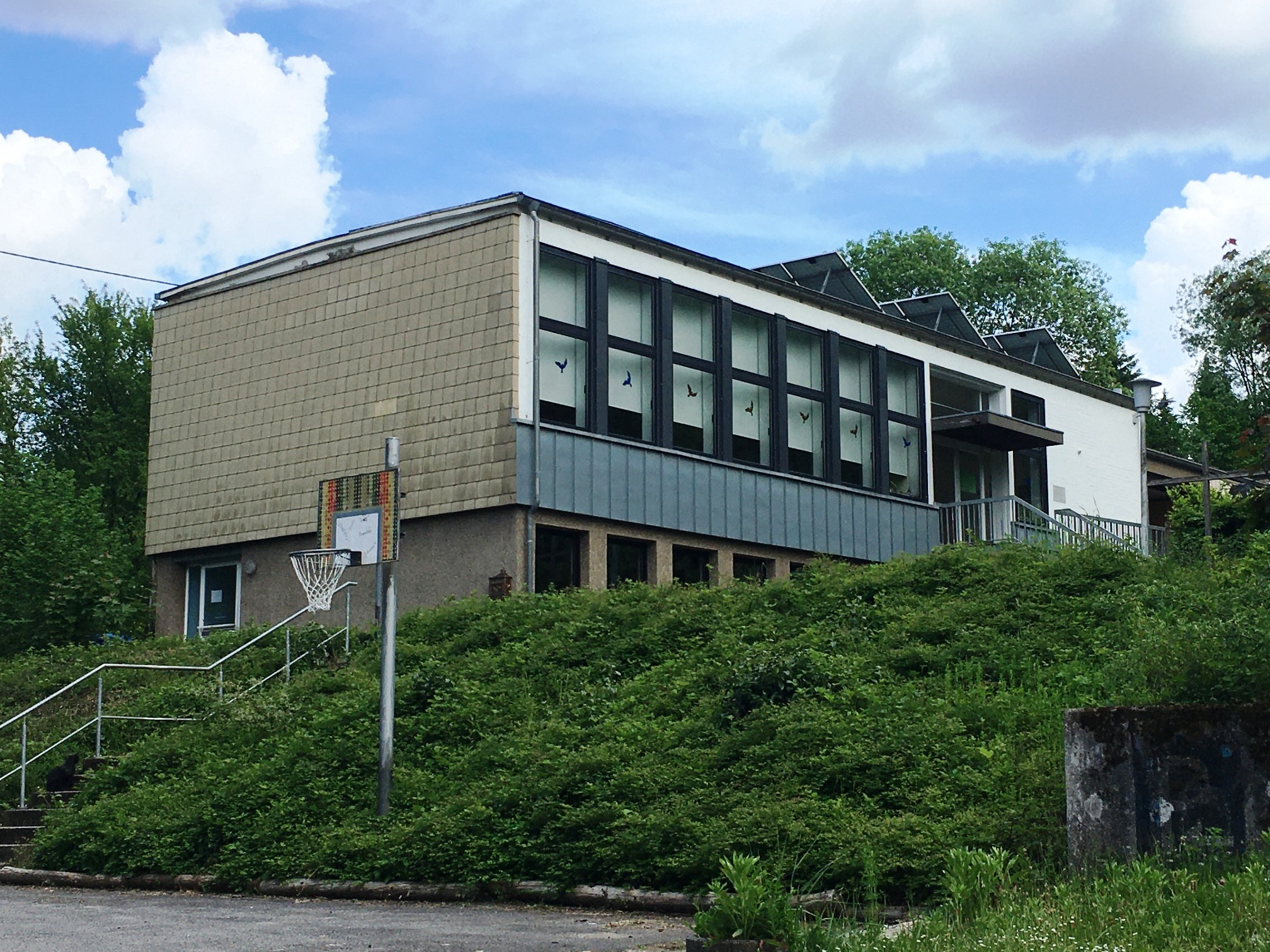
Protestant community centre

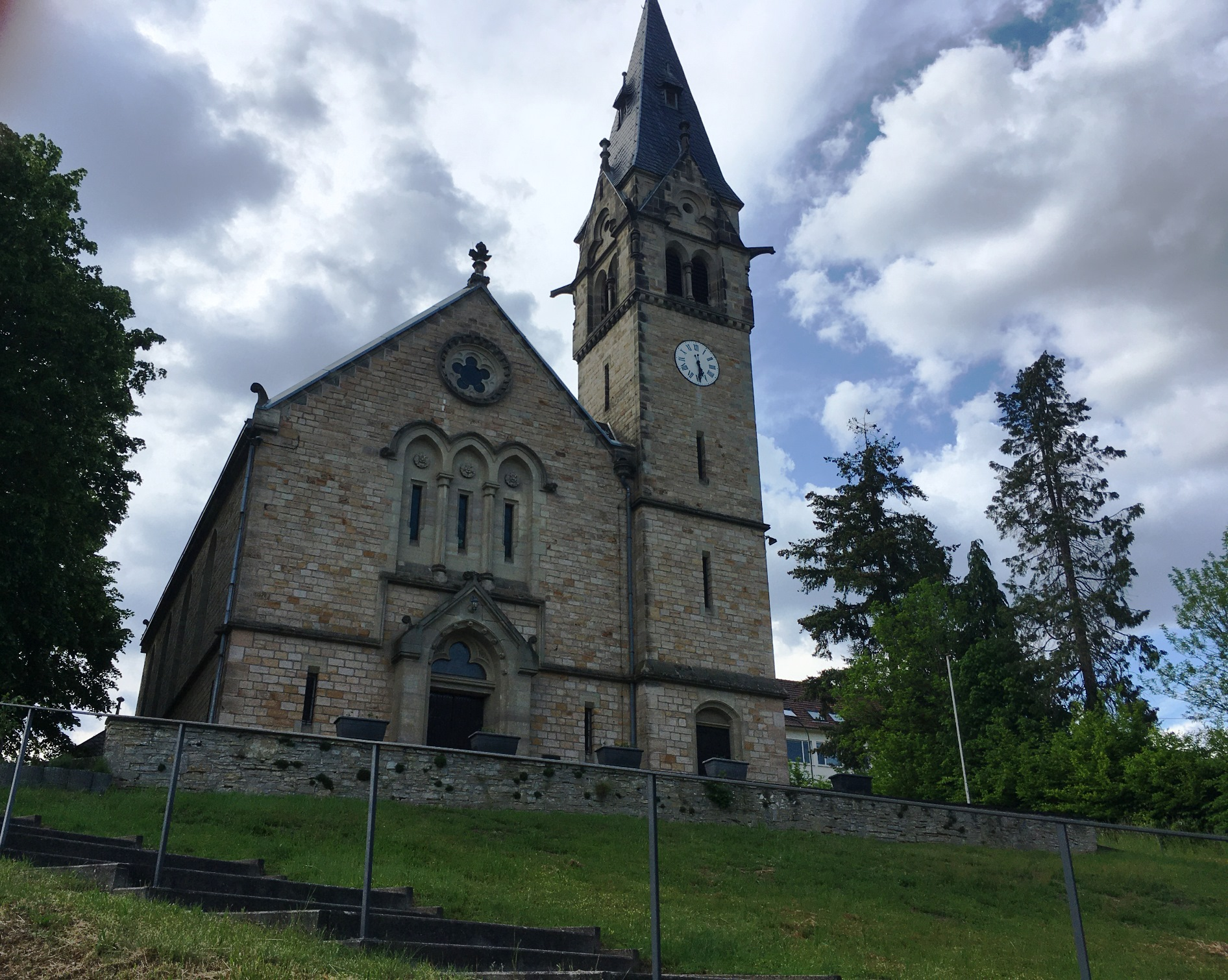
Protestant church

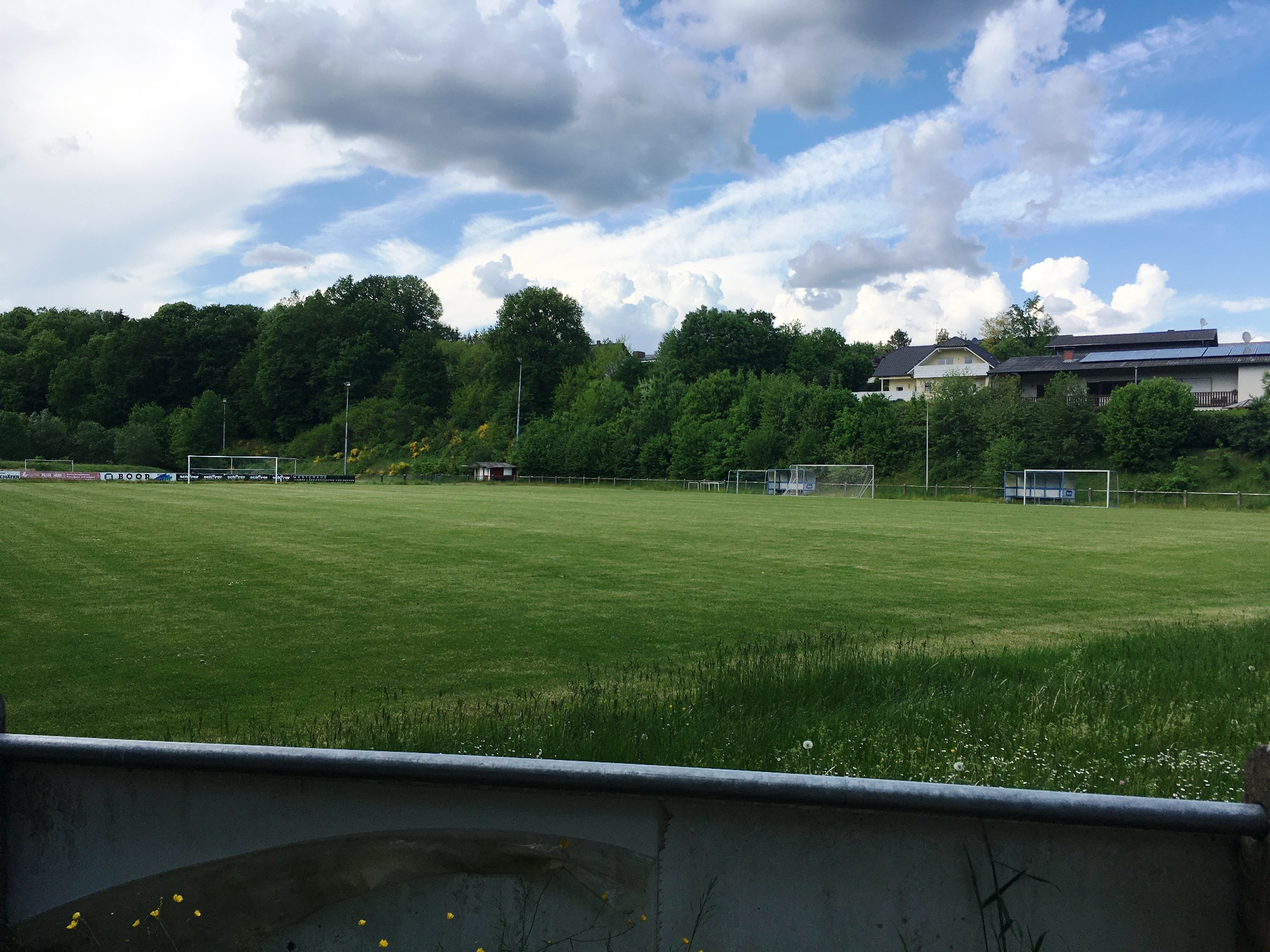
Sports field

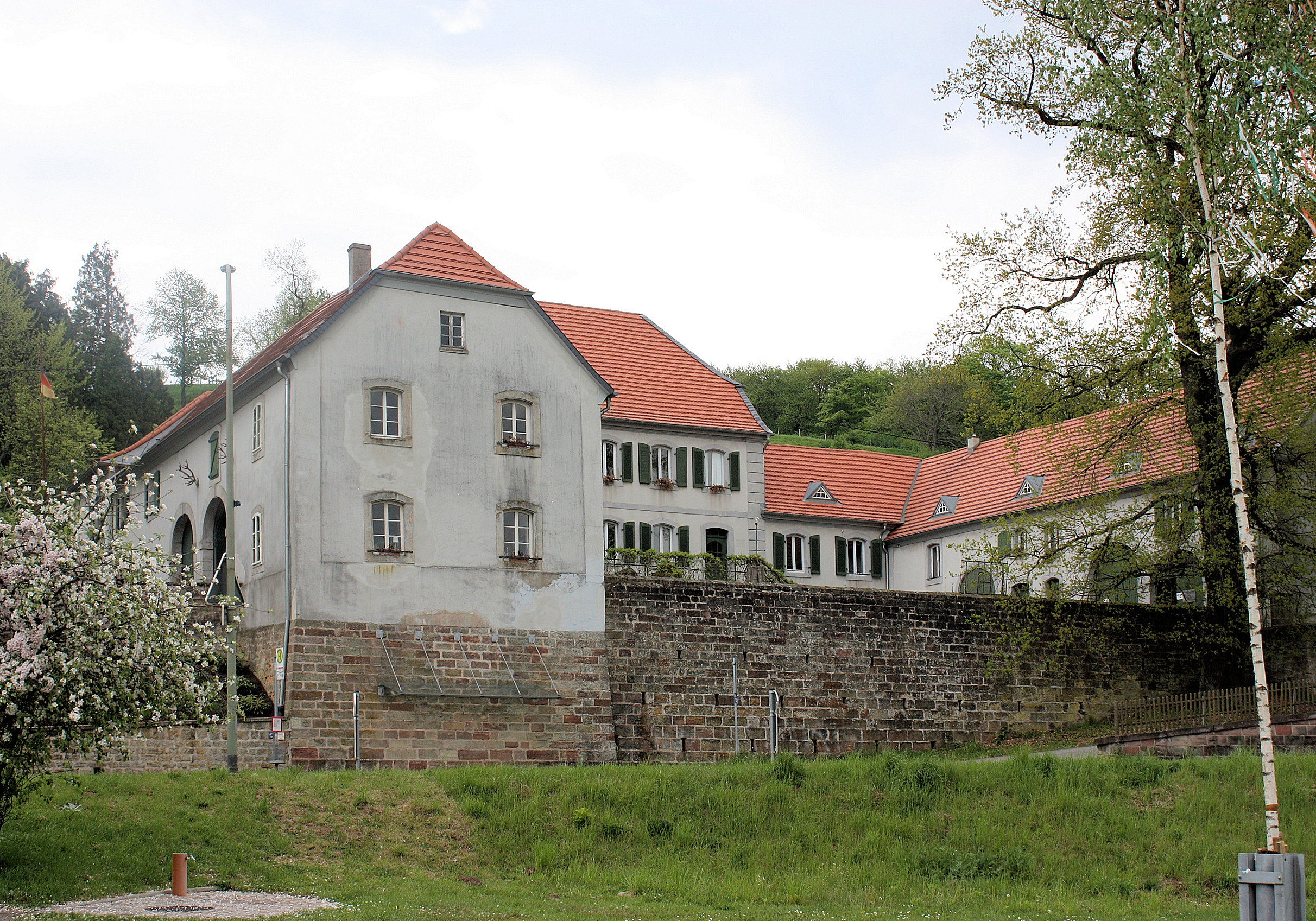
Jagdschloss Karlsbrunn

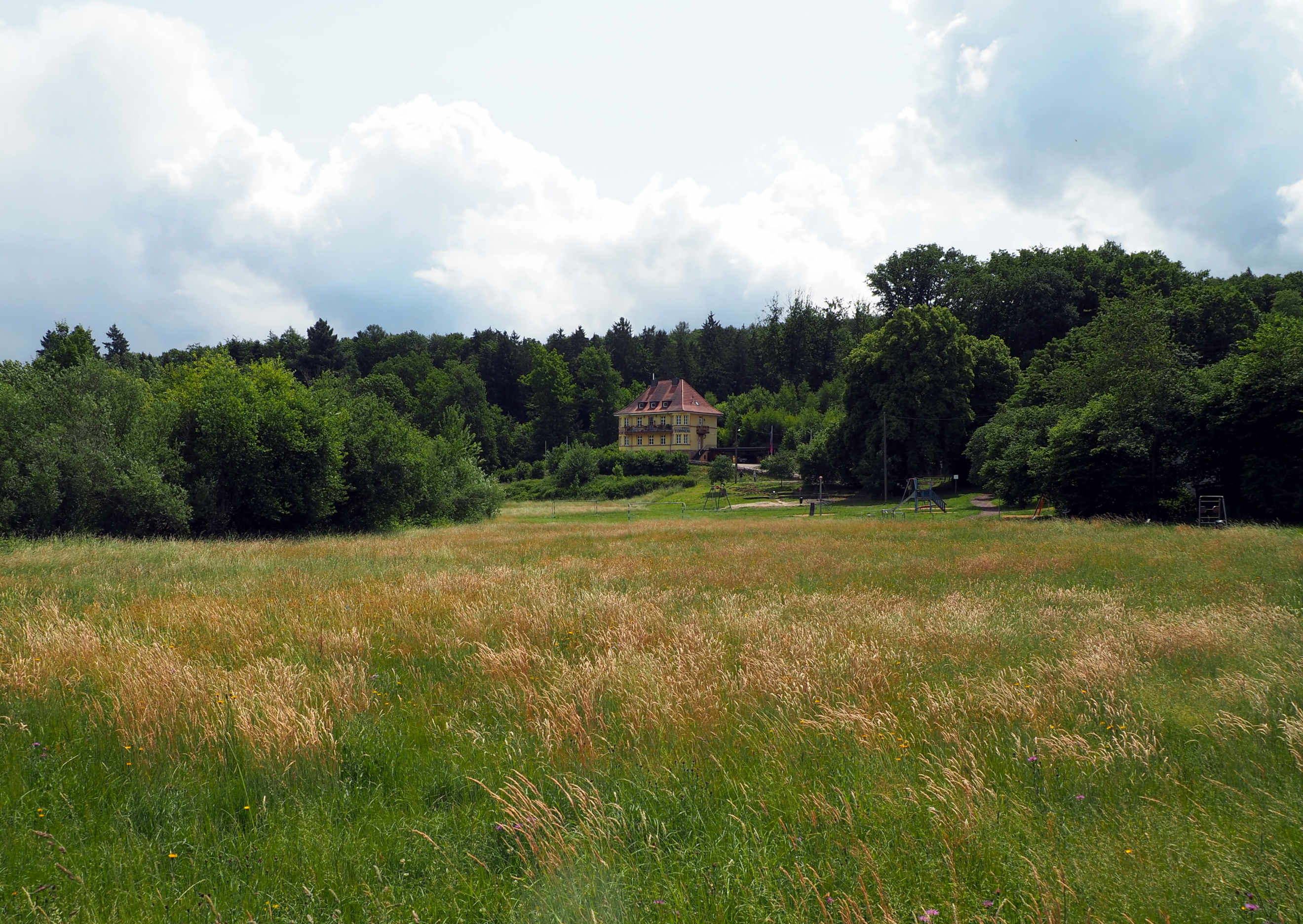
Villa Tannenhof
