= Morsbach (disambiguation) =

Morsbach is a municipality in the Oberbergischer Kreis, in North Rhine-Westphalia, Germany.

Morsbach or Mörsbach may also refer to:

- Morsbach, Moselle, a commune in the Moselle department in north-eastern France
- Morsbach (Wupper), a river of North Rhine-Westphalia, Germany
- Mörsbach, an Ortsgemeinde in the Westerwaldkreis in Rhineland-Palatinate, Germany
- Petra Morsbach (born 1956), German author
