= Völklingen =

- Town
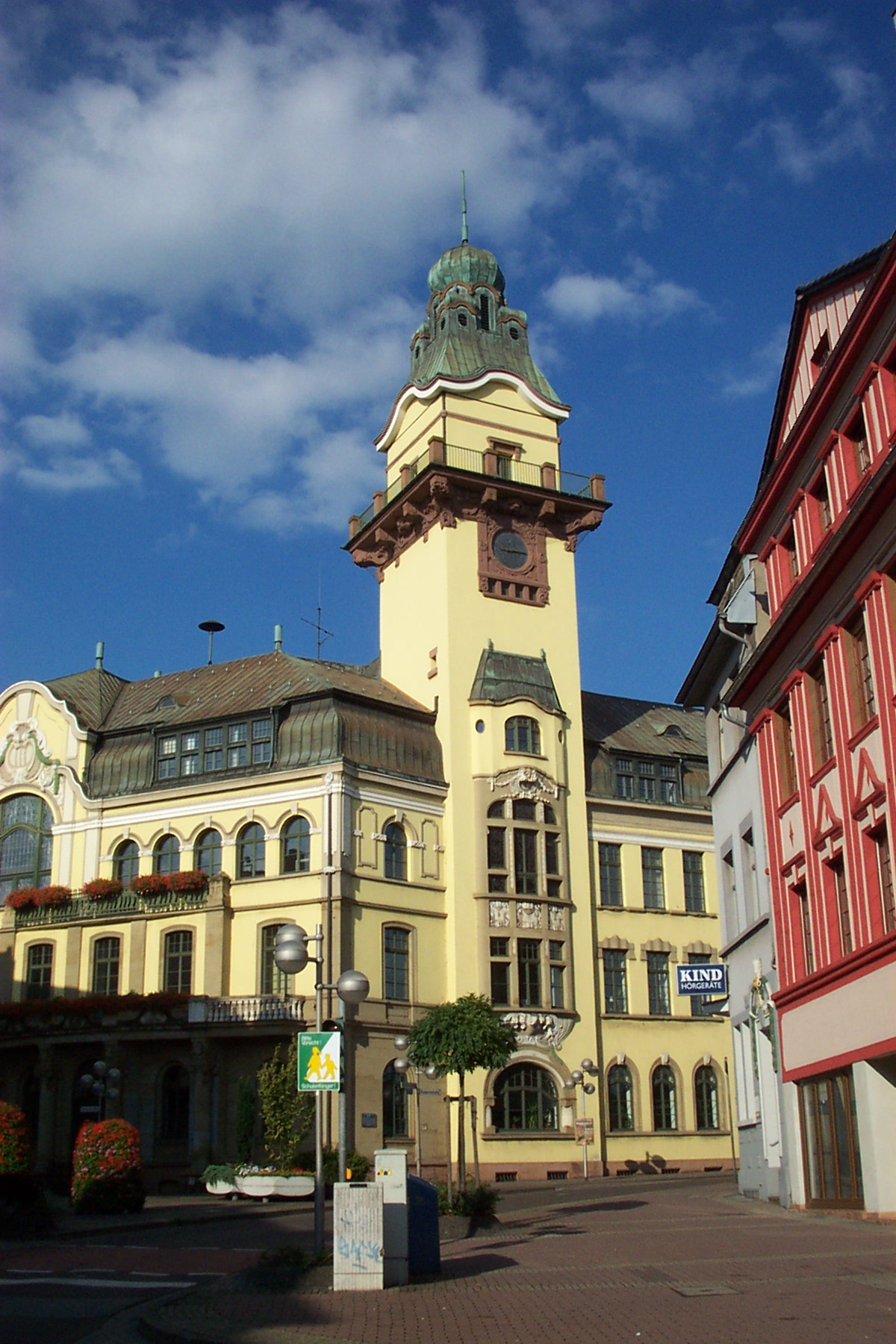

- Flag Coat of arms

- Location of Völklingen within Saarbrücken district
- Interactive map of Völklingen
- Location within Germany Location within Saarland
- Coordinates: 49°15′N 06°50′E
- Country: Germany
- State: Saarland
- District: Saarbrücken

Government
  - Mayor (2017–27): Christiane Blatt (SPD)

Area
  - Total: 67.06 km^{2} (25.89 sq mi)
- Elevation: 255 m (837 ft)

Population (2025-12-31)
  - Total: 40,565
  - Density: 604.9/km^{2} (1,567/sq mi)
- Time zone: UTC+01:00 (CET)
  - Summer (DST): UTC+02:00 (CEST)
- Postal codes: 66301–66333
- Dialling codes: 06898, 06802
- Vehicle registration: VK
- Website: www.voelklingen.de

Völklingen (German pronunciation: [ˈfœlklɪŋən]; French: Vœlklange, Moselle Franconian: Välglinge) is a town in the district of Saarbrücken, in Saarland, Germany. It is situated on the river Saar, approx. 10 km west of Saarbrücken, and directly borders France.

The town is known for its industrial past, the Völklinger Hütte (ironworks) being declared by UNESCO as a World Heritage Site.

== History ==
In antiquity it was settled by Celtic tribes, then by the Romans. The Franks settled in the area between the 5th and 9th centuries. Völkingen was initially referred to as "Fulcolingas" by Durandis, Vice Chancellor to Louis the Pious in 822.

Peasants living in the area were subject to taxation by the Count of Saarbrücken. The peasants of Völkingen revolted against the Count of Saarbrücken in 1566, when he ordered the construction of the Homburger castle.

== Geography ==
Völklingen is situated on the fertile alluvial plane at the confluence of the river Rossel and of the river Köller into the river Saar.

=== Subdivisions ===
The town is divided into ten Stadtteile (quarters):

- Völkingen
- Fenne
- Fürstenhausen
- Geislautern
- Heidstock
- Lauterbach
- Ludweiler
- Luisenthal
- Röchlinghöhe
- Wehrden

=== Climate ===
Völklingen has an oceanic climate (Köppen: Cfb; Trewartha: Dobk).

Climate data for Völklingen, 1961–1990 normals, extremes 1961–1982
Month	Jan	Feb	Mar	Apr	May	Jun	Jul	Aug	Sep	Oct	Nov	Dec	Year
Record high °C (°F)	15.0 (59.0)	17.5 (63.5)	23.6 (74.5)	29.0 (84.2)	30.5 (86.9)	33.2 (91.8)	36.3 (97.3)	34.5 (94.1)	33.6 (92.5)	27.4 (81.3)	21.2 (70.2)	16.1 (61.0)	36.3 (97.3)
Mean maximum °C (°F)	10.3 (50.5)	12.4 (54.3)	17.4 (63.3)	23.2 (73.8)	27.0 (80.6)	29.6 (85.3)	31.6 (88.9)	31.2 (88.2)	27.6 (81.7)	22.7 (72.9)	16.1 (61.0)	11.9 (53.4)	32.7 (90.9)
Mean daily maximum °C (°F)	4.0 (39.2)	6.6 (43.9)	10.1 (50.2)	14.3 (57.7)	18.7 (65.7)	22.0 (71.6)	23.7 (74.7)	23.4 (74.1)	20.5 (68.9)	14.9 (58.8)	8.6 (47.5)	4.6 (40.3)	14.3 (57.7)
Daily mean °C (°F)	1.5 (34.7)	3.2 (37.8)	6.0 (42.8)	9.6 (49.3)	13.7 (56.7)	17.1 (62.8)	18.6 (65.5)	17.9 (64.2)	14.9 (58.8)	10.3 (50.5)	5.6 (42.1)	2.2 (36.0)	10.0 (50.0)
Mean daily minimum °C (°F)	−0.9 (30.4)	0.1 (32.2)	2.1 (35.8)	4.7 (40.5)	8.2 (46.8)	11.5 (52.7)	12.9 (55.2)	12.7 (54.9)	10.0 (50.0)	6.5 (43.7)	2.9 (37.2)	−0.3 (31.5)	5.9 (42.6)
Mean minimum °C (°F)	−8.9 (16.0)	−7.0 (19.4)	−4.9 (23.2)	−1.3 (29.7)	1.7 (35.1)	5.9 (42.6)	7.5 (45.5)	6.7 (44.1)	4.3 (39.7)	−0.1 (31.8)	−4.1 (24.6)	−8.5 (16.7)	−11.5 (11.3)
Record low °C (°F)	−16.8 (1.8)	−14.4 (6.1)	−11.2 (11.8)	−4.5 (23.9)	−1.2 (29.8)	2.6 (36.7)	4.4 (39.9)	4.8 (40.6)	0.7 (33.3)	−3.0 (26.6)	−9.0 (15.8)	−14.0 (6.8)	−16.8 (1.8)
Average precipitation mm (inches)	56.6 (2.23)	51.1 (2.01)	52.9 (2.08)	47.0 (1.85)	62.3 (2.45)	64.4 (2.54)	65.7 (2.59)	62.6 (2.46)	55.4 (2.18)	52.4 (2.06)	73.3 (2.89)	68.8 (2.71)	712.4 (28.05)
Average extreme snow depth cm (inches)	5.6 (2.2)	3.7 (1.5)	2.4 (0.9)	0.3 (0.1)	0 (0)	0 (0)	0 (0)	0 (0)	0 (0)	0 (0)	1.8 (0.7)	3.8 (1.5)	9.8 (3.9)
Average precipitation days (≥ 0.1 mm)	15.9	12.6	14.9	13.1	14.7	12.4	11.7	12.1	10.5	12.2	15.2	14.3	159.7
Average relative humidity (%)	83.5	79.0	73.9	68.6	66.3	67.1	67.2	70.6	75.1	80.0	82.2	83.1	74.7
Source: Deutscher Wetterdienst/SKlima.de

== Twin towns – sister cities ==
Völklingen is twinned with:

- Ars-sur-Moselle, France
- Forbach, France
- Les Lilas, France

== Notable people ==
- Johannes Schulz (1884–1942), catholic priest, died of hunger in Dachau concentration camp
- Hermann Neuberger (1919–1992), president of DFB
- Claus Peter Schnorr (1943–2025), German mathematician and cryptographer
- Annegret Kramp-Karrenbauer (born 1962), politician (CDU)
- Daniel Sträßer (born 1987), actor
- Carrie Schreiner (born 1998), racing driver

== Gallery ==
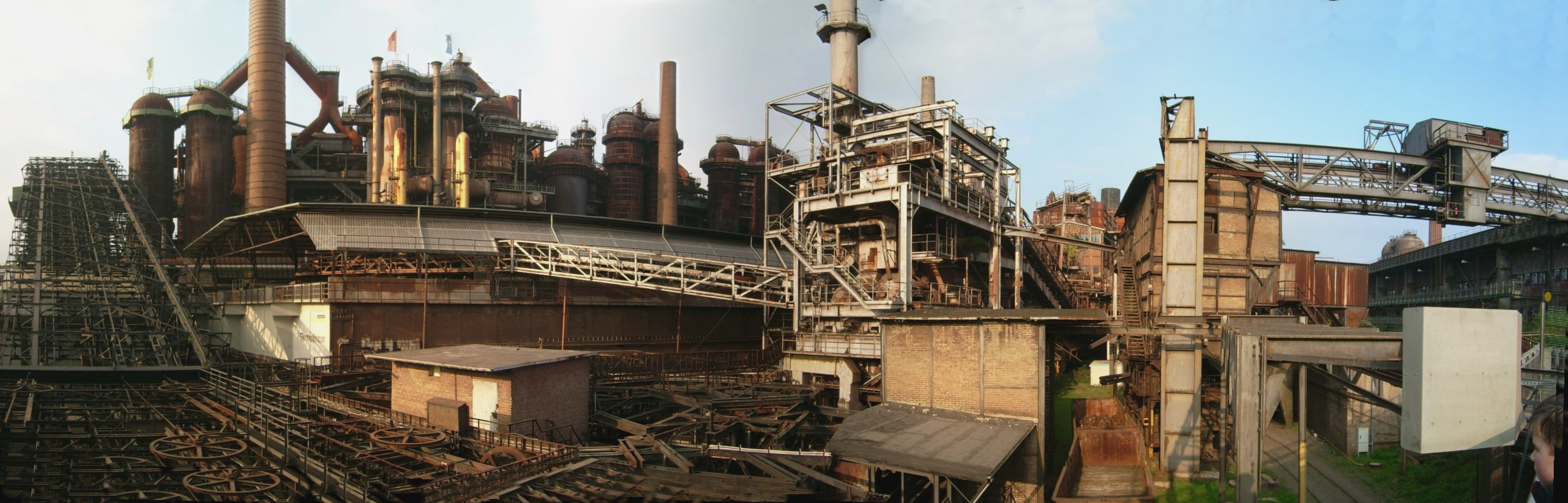
Völklinger Hütte panorama
