= Riegelsberg =

- Municipality
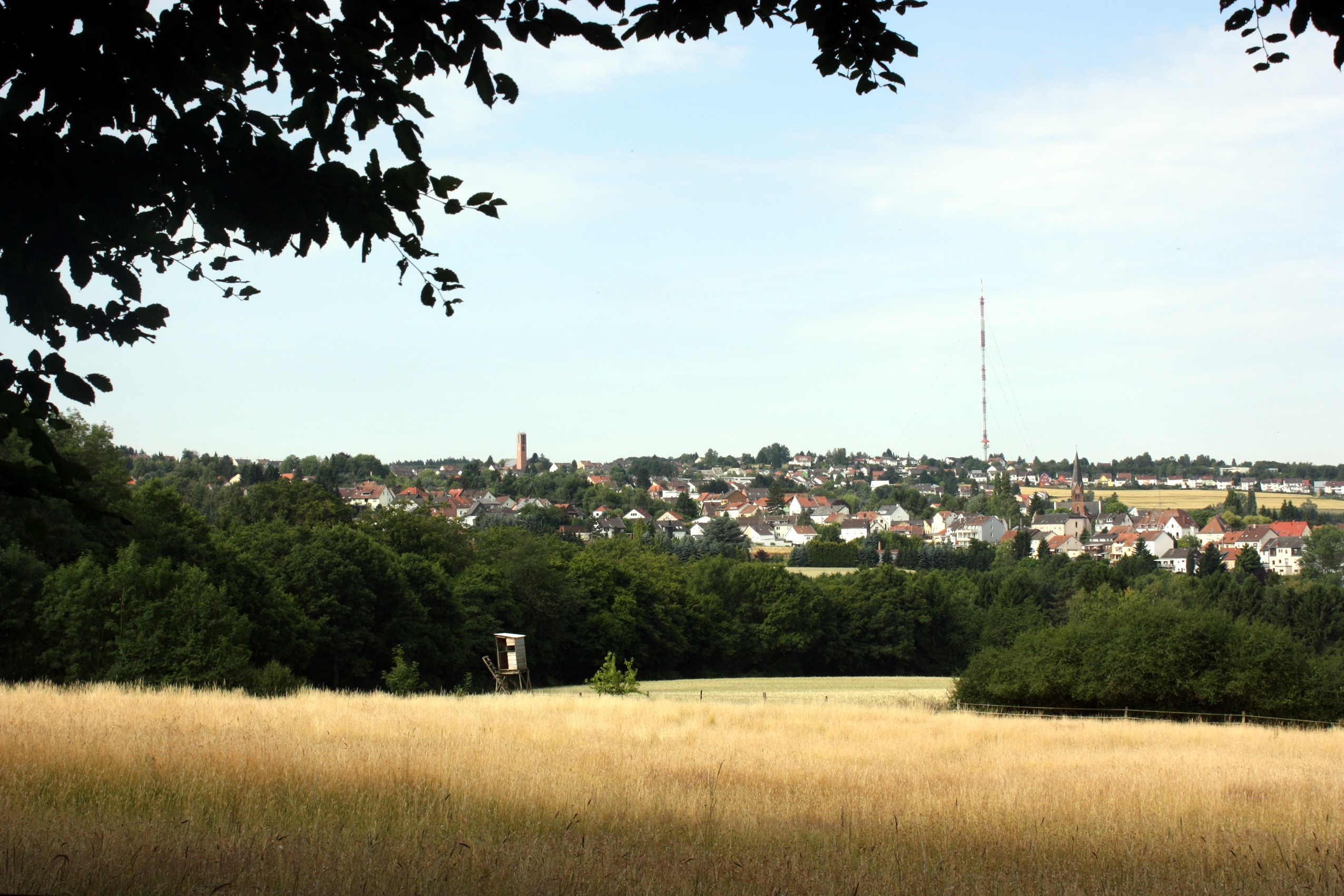
- General view of Riegelsberg

- Coat of arms

- Location of Riegelsberg within Saarbrücken district
- Interactive map of Riegelsberg
- Location within Germany Location within Saarland
- Coordinates: 49°17′N 6°55′E
- Country: Germany
- State: Saarland
- District: Saarbrücken
- Subdivisions: 2

Government
  - Mayor (2019–29): Klaus Häusle (SPD)

Area
  - Total: 14.65 km^{2} (5.66 sq mi)
- Elevation: 337 m (1,106 ft)

Population (2025-12-31)
  - Total: 14,255
  - Density: 973.0/km^{2} (2,520/sq mi)
- Time zone: UTC+01:00 (CET)
  - Summer (DST): UTC+02:00 (CEST)
- Postal codes: 66292
- Dialling codes: 06806
- Vehicle registration: SB
- Website: www.riegelsberg.eu

Riegelsberg (German pronunciation: [ˈʁiːɡl̩sbɛʁk]) is a municipality in the District of Saarbrücken, Saarland, Germany. It is situated approximately 9 km northwest of Saarbrücken.
