= Petite-Rosselle =

- Commune
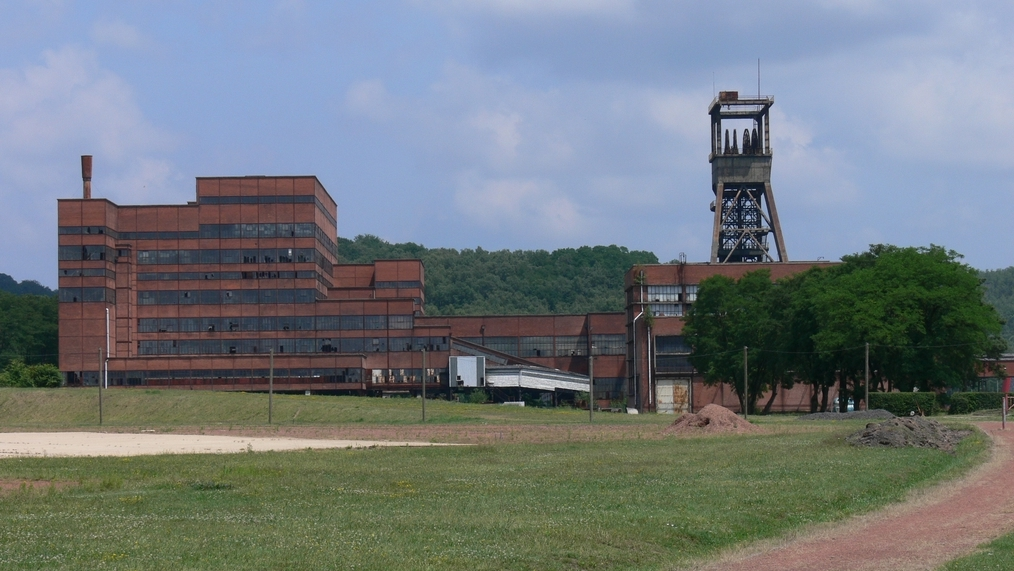
- Musée du carreau Wendel, a coal mining museum in Petite-Rosselle

- Coat of arms
- Location of Petite-Rosselle
- Location within France Location within Grand Est
- Coordinates: 49°12′44″N 6°51′30″E
- Country: France
- Region: Grand Est
- Department: Moselle
- Arrondissement: Forbach-Boulay-Moselle
- Canton: Forbach
- Intercommunality: CA Forbach Porte de France

Government
  - Mayor (2020–2026): Eric Federspiel
- Area^{1}: 5.05 km^{2} (1.95 sq mi)
- Elevation: 310 m (1,020 ft)
- Highest elevation: 313 m (1,027 ft)
- Lowest elevation: 190 m (620 ft)
- Population (2023): 6,171
  - Density: 1,220/km^{2} (3,160/sq mi)
- Time zone: UTC+01:00 (CET)
  - Summer (DST): UTC+02:00 (CEST)
- INSEE/Postal code: 57537 /57540
- ^{1} French Land Register data, which excludes lakes, ponds, glaciers > 1 km^{2} (0.386 sq mi or 247 acres) and river estuaries.

Petite-Rosselle (French pronunciation: [pətit ʁɔsɛl], lit. 'Little Rosselle', in contrast to "Big Rosselle"; German: Kleinrosseln; Palatine German: Klänrossle) is a commune in the Moselle department of the Grand Est region in north-eastern France. The commune is separated from neighbouring Großrosseln to its west by the small river Rossel, which forms the border between France and Germany.

== History ==
From the year's 843 signing of the Treaty of Verdun, the location of the present commune fell within the territory of Middle Francia. Between 925–1542, it was part of the Duchy of Lorraine, within the Holy Roman Empire. From 1542-1766 it was in the independent Duchy of Lorraine. Between 1766-1871 it was incorporated into France.

Periodic wars between France and Germany led to the establishment of the frontier along the river Moselle. Between 1871–1918 the Imperial Territory of Alsace-Lorraine, including Petite-Rosselle, was annexed by the German Empire.

Following the Treaty of Versailles, Petite-Rosselle returned to French control and remained so until Nazi Germany again annexed the Moselle on 25 July 1940, incorporating it as CdZ-Gebiet Lothringen into the Gau Westmark.

Petite-Roselle shares most of its history with Großrosseln (French: Grande-Rosselle). The united commune of Rosselle was founded in 1290, and the lesser and greater parts of the commune on either side of the river were legally separated in 1326. The river Rosselle marks the border between France and Germany.

== Mining ==
Coal was discovered in the vicinity of the town in 1856 by the de Wendel family. Mining became the principal economic activity in the commune. Today all mining operations have closed, though several mines have been conserved for historical purposes as part of the Carreau Wendel Museum.

== Population ==
Historical population
Year	Pop.	±% p.a.
1968	8,301	—
1975	7,794	−0.90%
1982	7,160	−1.20%
1990	6,944	−0.38%
1999	6,785	−0.26%
2007	6,628	−0.29%
2012	6,507	−0.37%
2017	6,338	−0.52%
2023	6,171	−0.44%
Source: INSEE

== Twin towns ==
- Großrosseln (Germany)

== See also ==
- Communes of the Moselle department
