= Longeville-lès-Saint-Avold =

- Commune
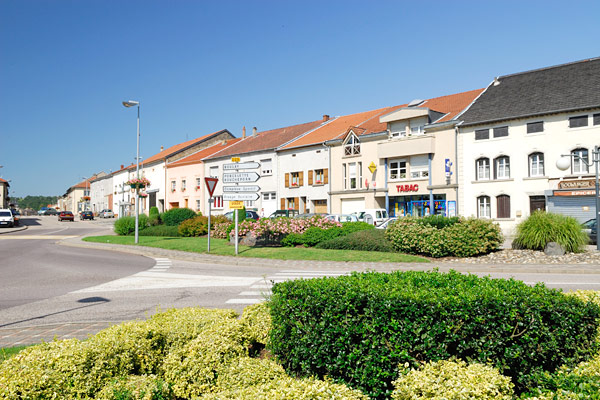
- A street in Longeville-lès-Saint-Avold

- Coat of arms
- Location of Longeville-lès-Saint-Avold
- Location within France Location within Grand Est
- Coordinates: 49°07′00″N 6°38′23″E
- Country: France
- Region: Grand Est
- Department: Moselle
- Arrondissement: Forbach-Boulay-Moselle
- Canton: Faulquemont
- Intercommunality: District Urbain de Faulquemont

Government
  - Mayor (2020–2026): Emmanuel Thiry
- Area^{1}: 24.54 km^{2} (9.47 sq mi)
- Elevation: 410 m (1,350 ft)
- Highest elevation: 411 m (1,348 ft)
- Lowest elevation: 228 m (748 ft)
- Population (2023): 3,572
  - Density: 145.6/km^{2} (377.0/sq mi)
- Time zone: UTC+01:00 (CET)
  - Summer (DST): UTC+02:00 (CEST)
- INSEE/Postal code: 57413 /57740
- ^{1} French Land Register data, which excludes lakes, ponds, glaciers > 1 km^{2} (0.386 sq mi or 247 acres) and river estuaries.

Longeville-lès-Saint-Avold (French pronunciation: [lɔ̃ʒvil lɛ sɛ̃.t‿avɔld], literally Longeville near Saint-Avold; German: old: Lungenfeld, official: Lubeln 1870-1918, Langsdorf 1940-44) is a commune in the Moselle department in Grand Est in north-eastern France.

== Population ==
Historical population
Year	Pop.	±% p.a.
1968	3,170	—
1975	3,372	+0.89%
1982	3,664	+1.19%
1990	3,690	+0.09%
1999	3,750	+0.18%
2007	3,760	+0.03%
2012	3,775	+0.08%
2017	3,666	−0.58%
2023	3,572	−0.43%
Source: INSEE

== See also ==
- Communes of the Moselle department
