= Morsbach, Moselle =

Morsbach
- Commune
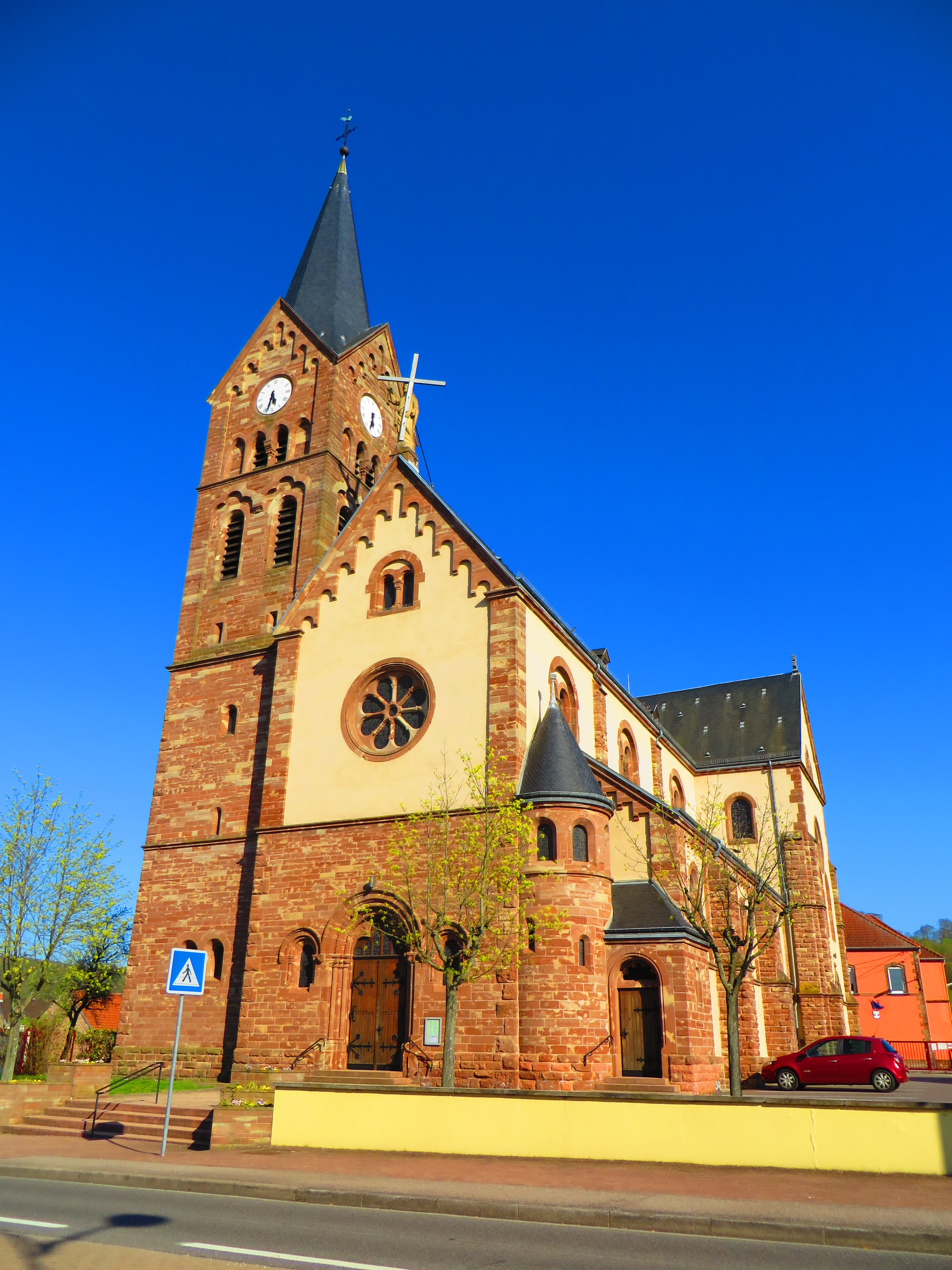
- The church in Morsbach

- Coat of arms
- Location of Morsbach
- Location within France Location within Grand Est
- Coordinates: 49°10′04″N 6°52′18″E
- Country: France
- Region: Grand Est
- Department: Moselle
- Arrondissement: Forbach-Boulay-Moselle
- Canton: Forbach
- Intercommunality: CA Forbach Porte de France

Government
  - Mayor (2020–2026): Gilbert Schuh
- Area^{1}: 5.09 km^{2} (1.97 sq mi)
- Elevation: 215 m (705 ft)
- Highest elevation: 320 m (1,050 ft)
- Lowest elevation: 197 m (646 ft)
- Population (2023): 2,635
  - Density: 518/km^{2} (1,340/sq mi)
- Time zone: UTC+01:00 (CET)
  - Summer (DST): UTC+02:00 (CEST)
- INSEE/Postal code: 57484 /57600
- ^{1} French Land Register data, which excludes lakes, ponds, glaciers > 1 km^{2} (0.386 sq mi or 247 acres) and river estuaries.

Morsbach (French pronunciation: [mɔʁsbak]) is a commune in the Moselle department in Grand Est in north-eastern France.

== Population ==
Historical population
Year	Pop.	±% p.a.
1968	2,497	—
1975	2,573	+0.43%
1982	2,452	−0.69%
1990	2,464	+0.06%
1999	2,449	−0.07%
2007	2,572	+0.61%
2012	2,619	+0.36%
2017	2,686	+0.51%
2023	2,635	−0.32%
Source: INSEE

== See also ==
- Communes of the Moselle department
