= Großrosseln =

- Municipality
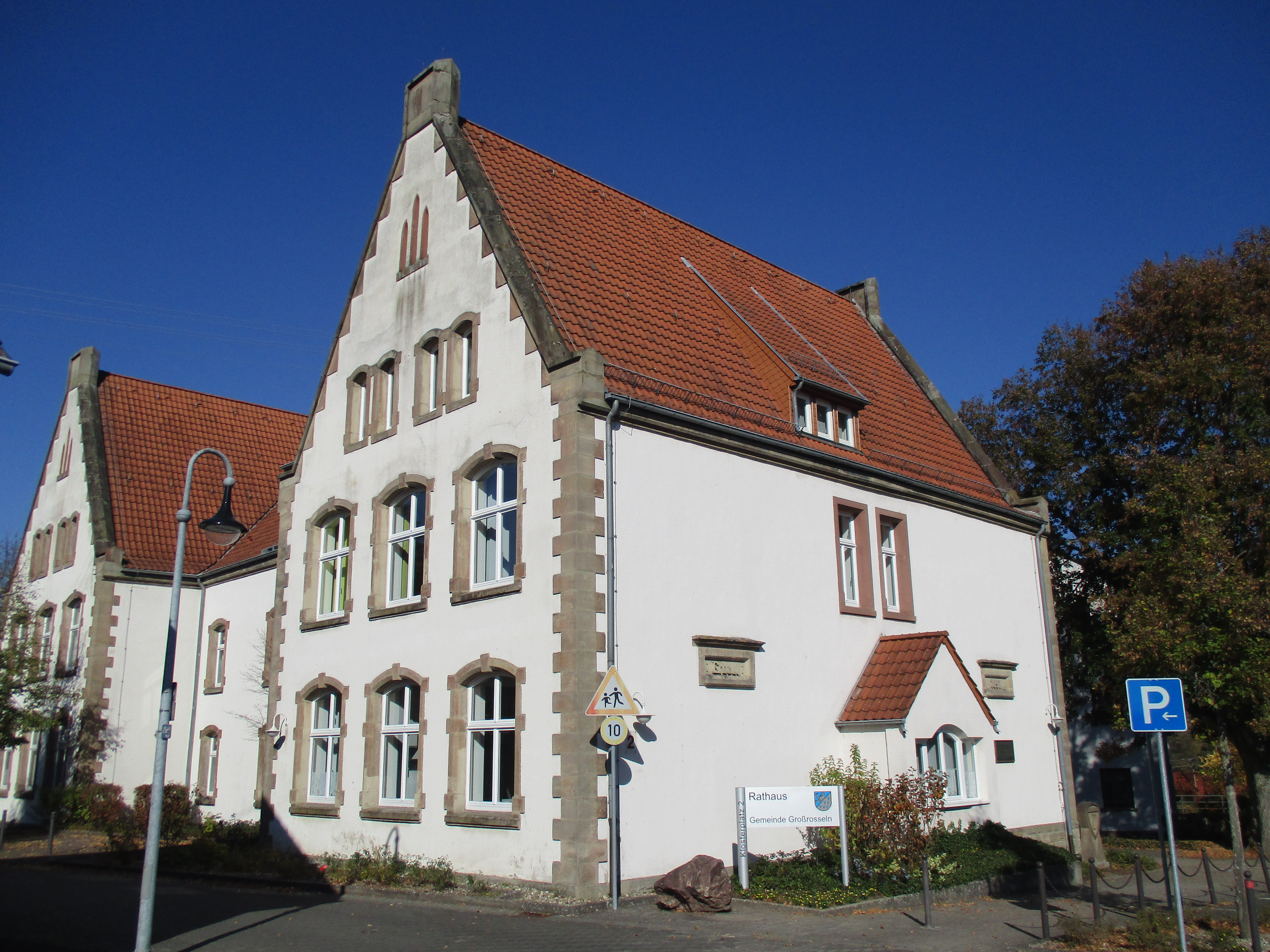
- Town hall

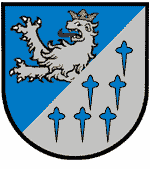
- Coat of arms

- Location of Großrosseln within Saarbrücken district
- Interactive map of Großrosseln
- Location within Germany Location within Saarland
- Coordinates: 49°12′N 6°50′E
- Country: Germany
- State: Saarland
- District: Saarbrücken
- Subdivisions: 6

Government
  - Mayor (2019–29): Dominik Jochum (CDU)

Area
  - Total: 25.26 km^{2} (9.75 sq mi)
- Elevation: 229 m (751 ft)

Population (2025-12-31)
  - Total: 7,844
  - Density: 310.5/km^{2} (804.3/sq mi)
- Time zone: UTC+01:00 (CET)
  - Summer (DST): UTC+02:00 (CEST)
- Postal codes: 66347–66352
- Dialling codes: 06898; 06809
- Vehicle registration: SB
- Website: www.grossrosseln.de

Großrosseln (German pronunciation: [ˈɡʁoːsˌʁɔsln̩]; French: Grande-Rosselle, pronounced [ɡʁɑ̃d ʁɔsɛl], lit. 'Big Rosselle', in contrast to "Little Rosselle") is a village and a municipality in the district of Saarbrücken, in Saarland, Germany. It is situated on the border with France, approximately 12 km west of Saarbrücken. The neighbouring municipality in France is Petite-Rosselle.

== Geography ==
The Gemeinde (municipality) of Großrosseln is divided into 6 Gemeindebezirke (municipal districts): the main one Großrosseln, is where the Rathaus (town hall), Dorf im Warndt, Emmersweiler, Karlsbrunn, Naßweiler and the church of Sankt Nikolaus are found.

== Economy and Infrastructure ==
- Hammerschmitt (fashion store)
- Funeral Karl Fuss
- Megro GmbH & Co. KG (hulling mill, Juchem-Group)
- Natursteine Herz (virgin stone business)

== Culture ==
- Carnival association KV Doll Doll.

== Personalities ==
- Karlsbrunn was the birthplace of Dwight D. Eisenhower's early ancestor Hans Nicolas Eisenhauer, who emigrated to Pennsylvania in 1741.
- The football players Manuel Zeitz, Hendrick Zuck and Christian Weber played also for SC Großrosseln.

== Twin towns ==
- Morsbach (Germany)
- Petite-Rosselle (France)
- Rosbruck (France)

== Gallery ==
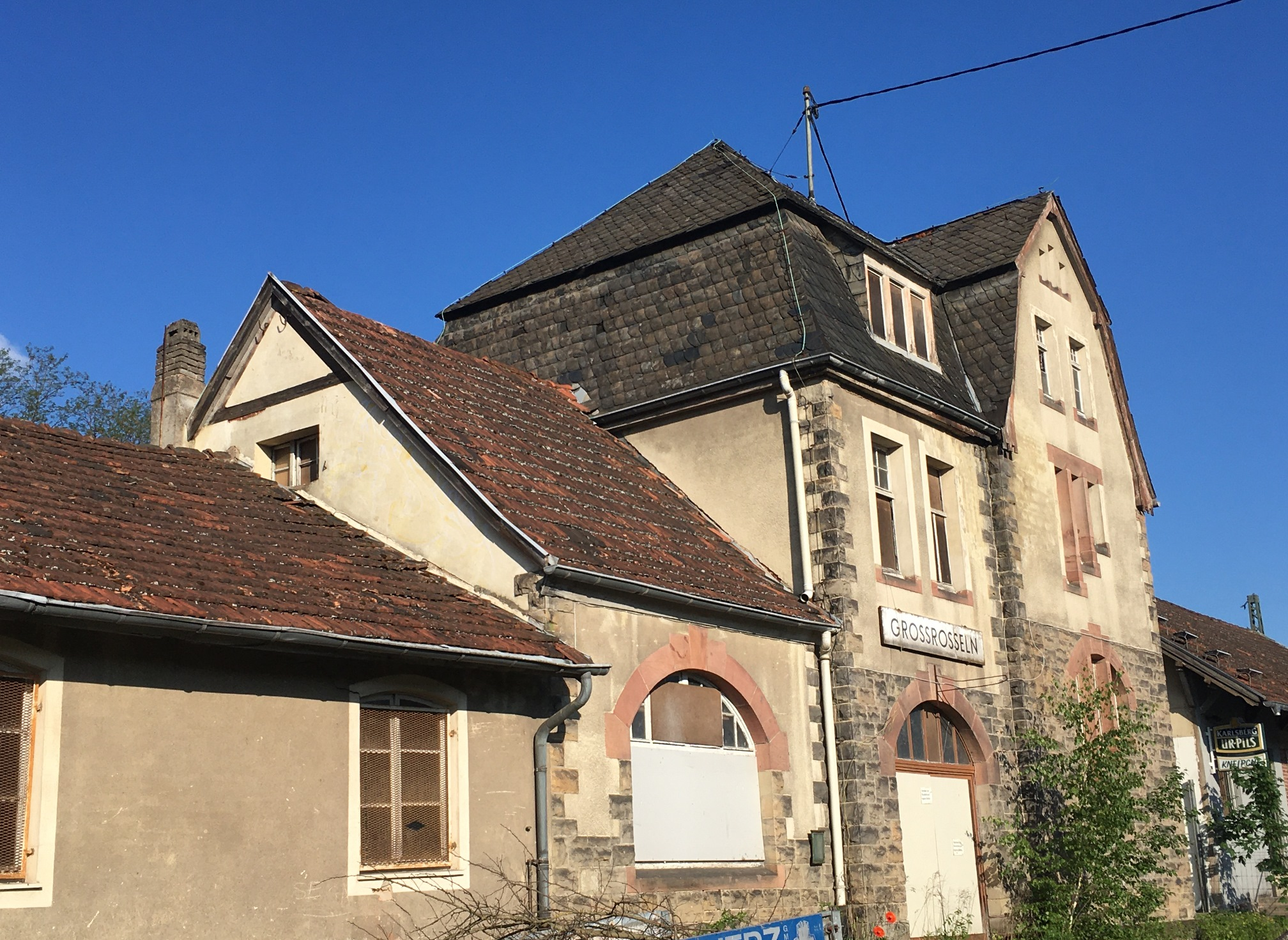
Old station Großrosseln

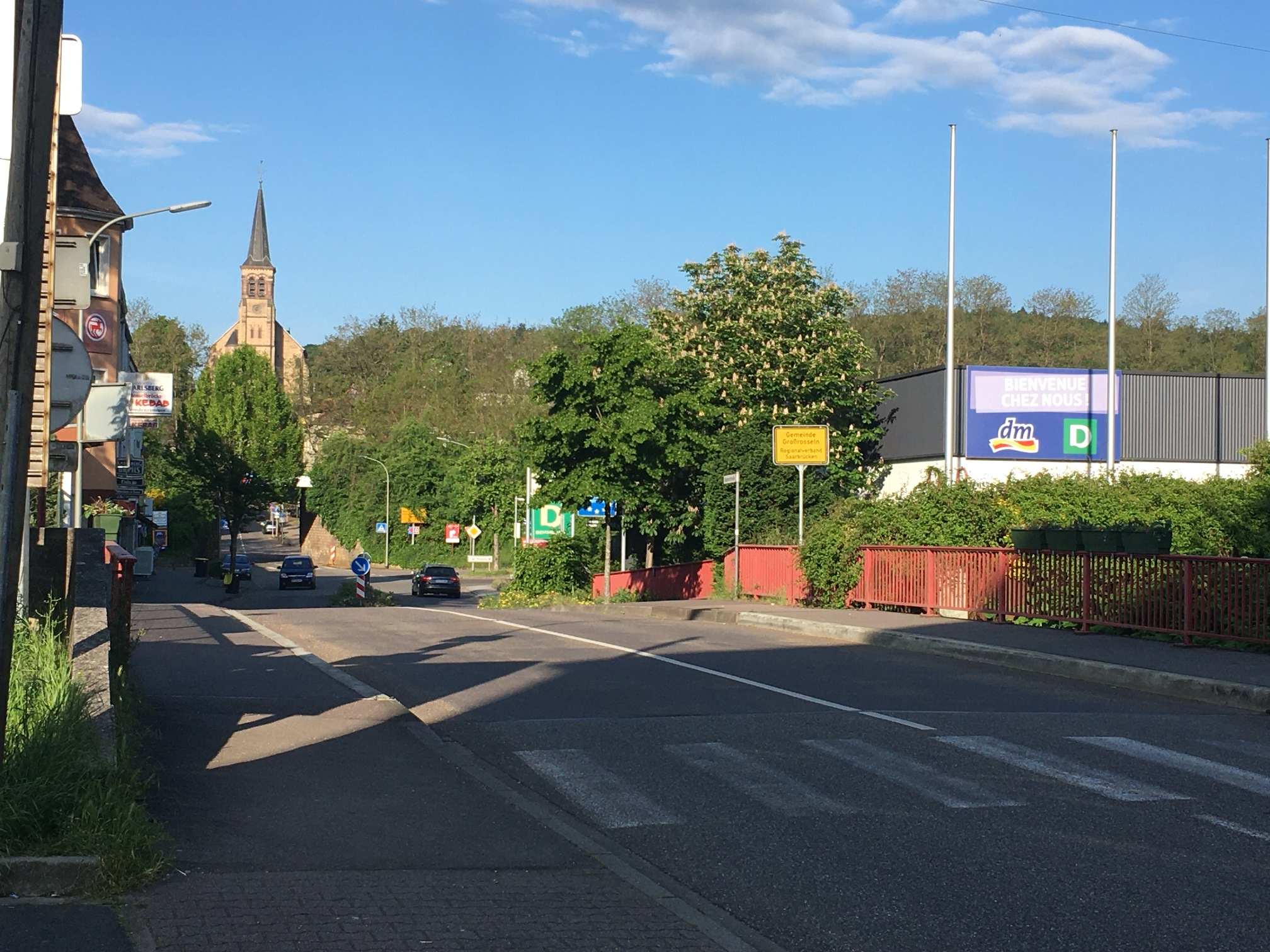
Border crossing Petite-Rosselle - Großrosseln

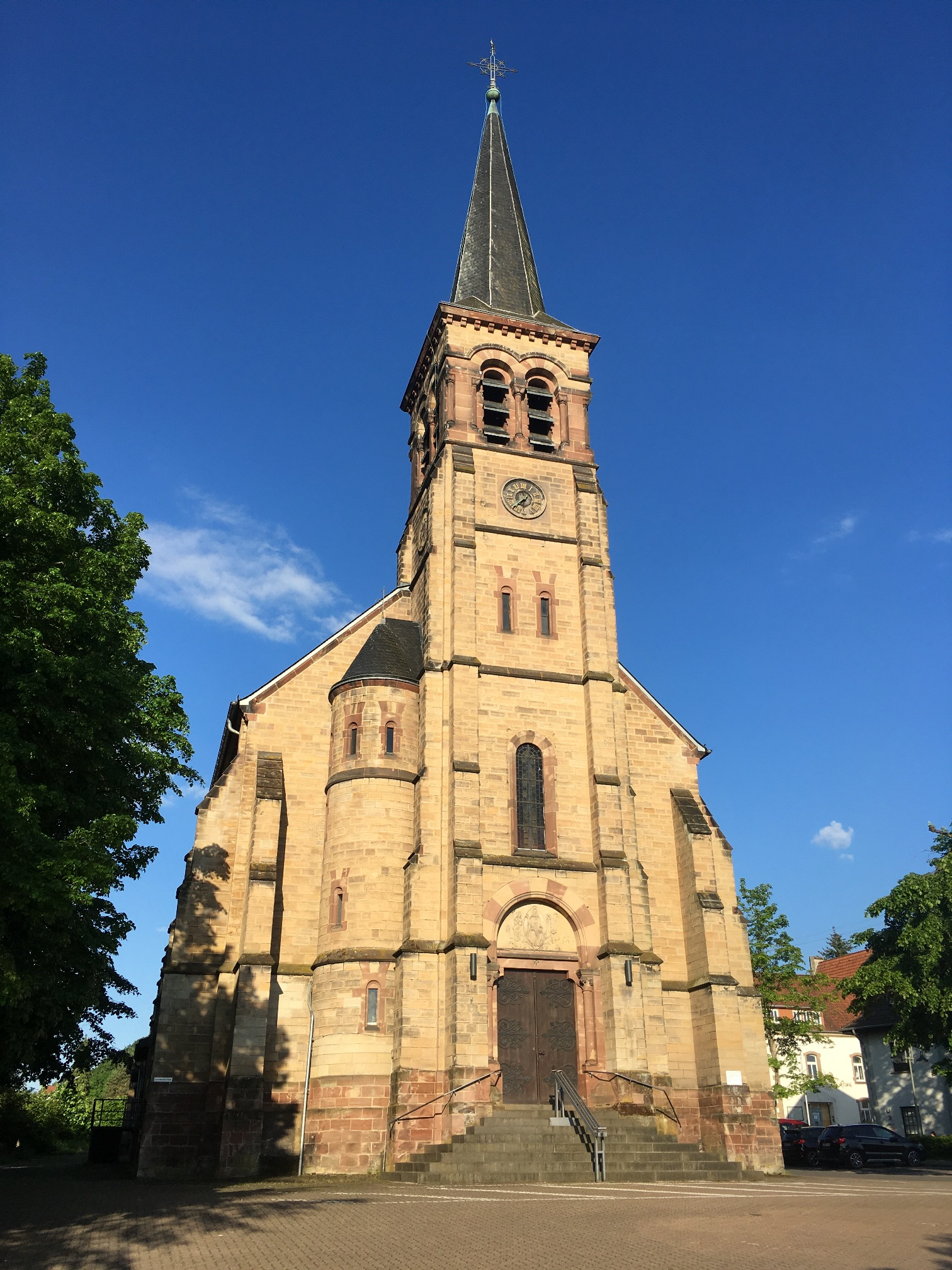
Catholic church St. Wendalinus Großrosseln

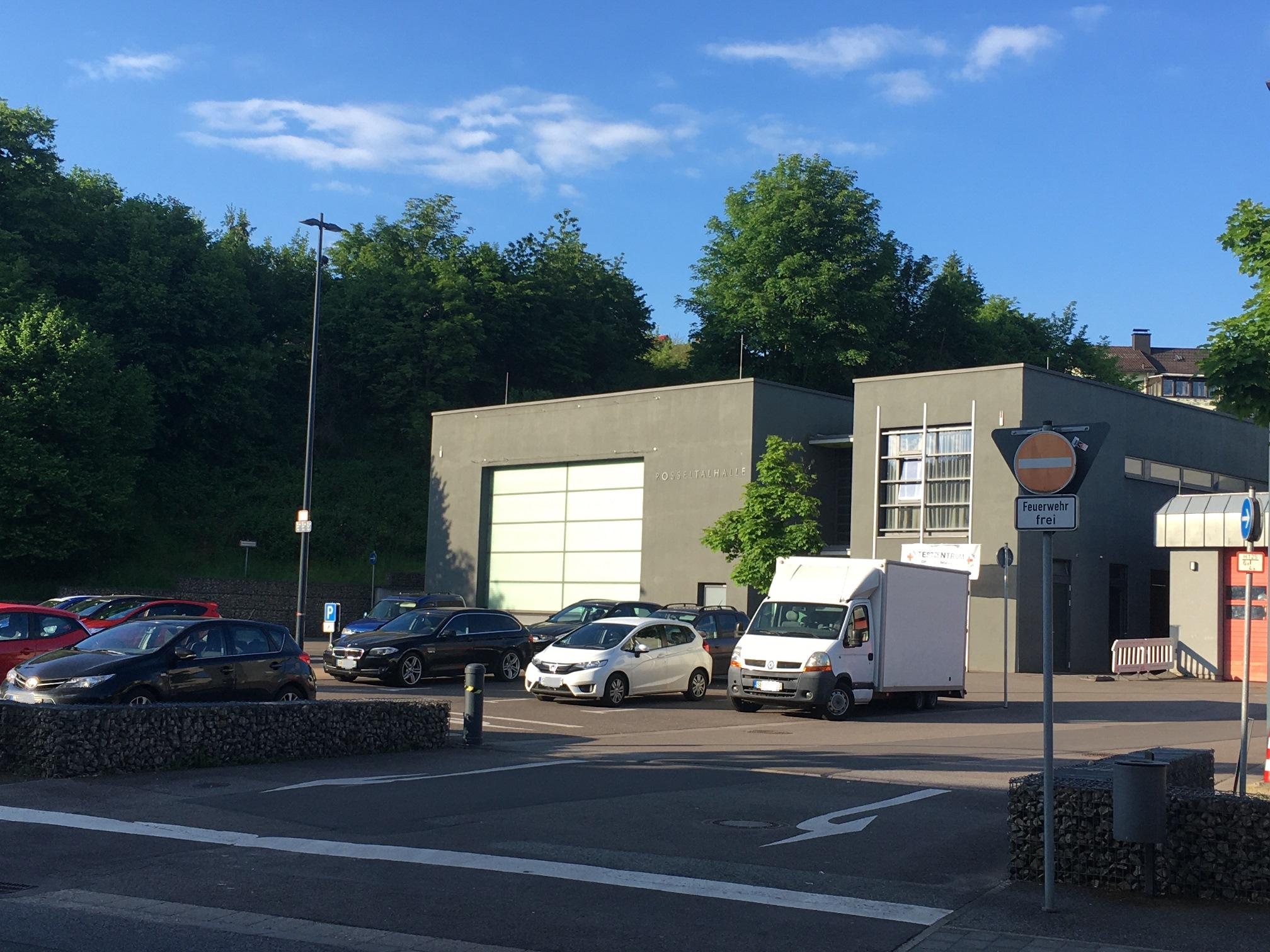
Rosseltalhalle Großrosseln

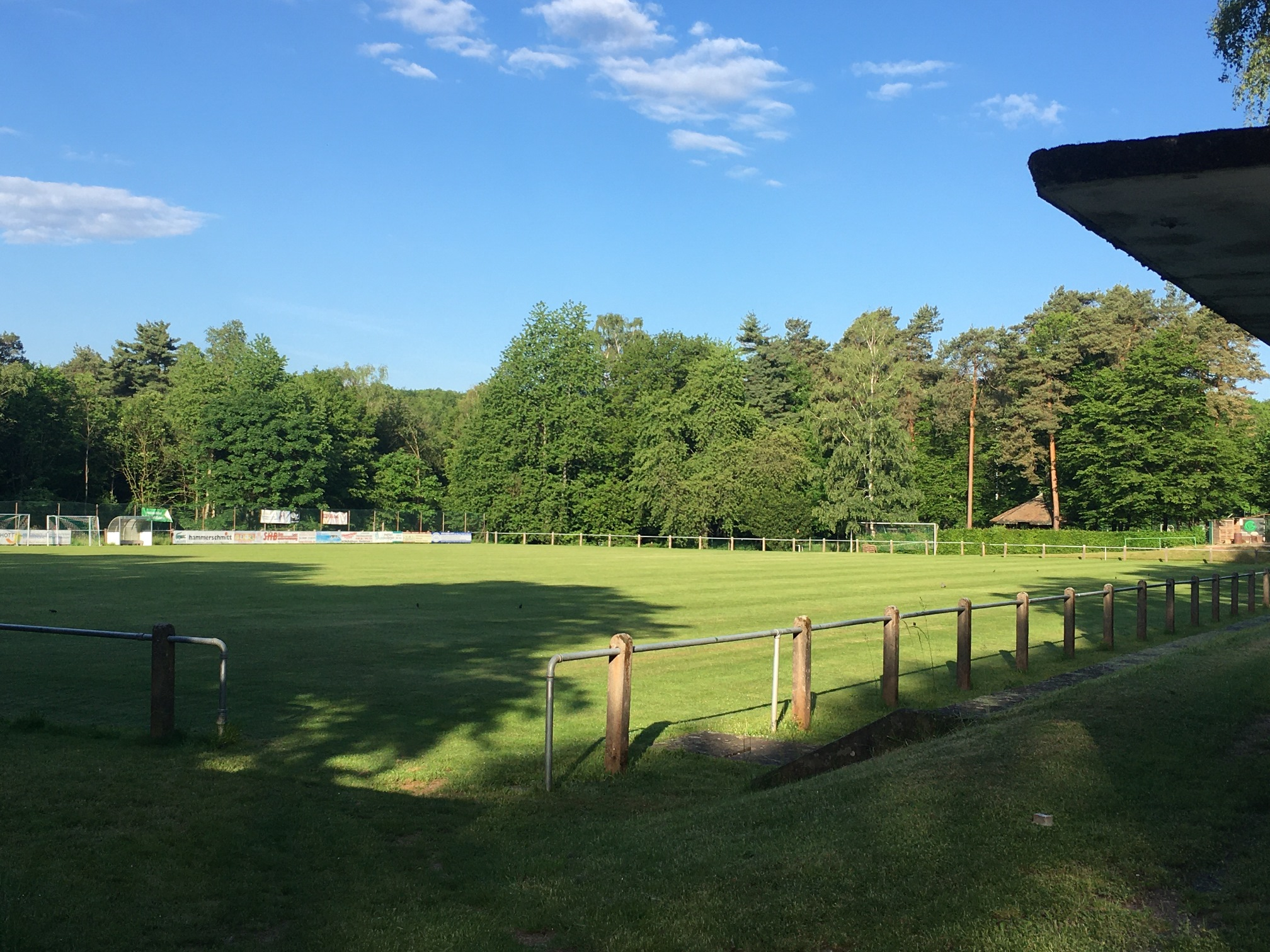
Sports field Nachtweide Großrosseln
