= Béning-lès-Saint-Avold =

- Commune
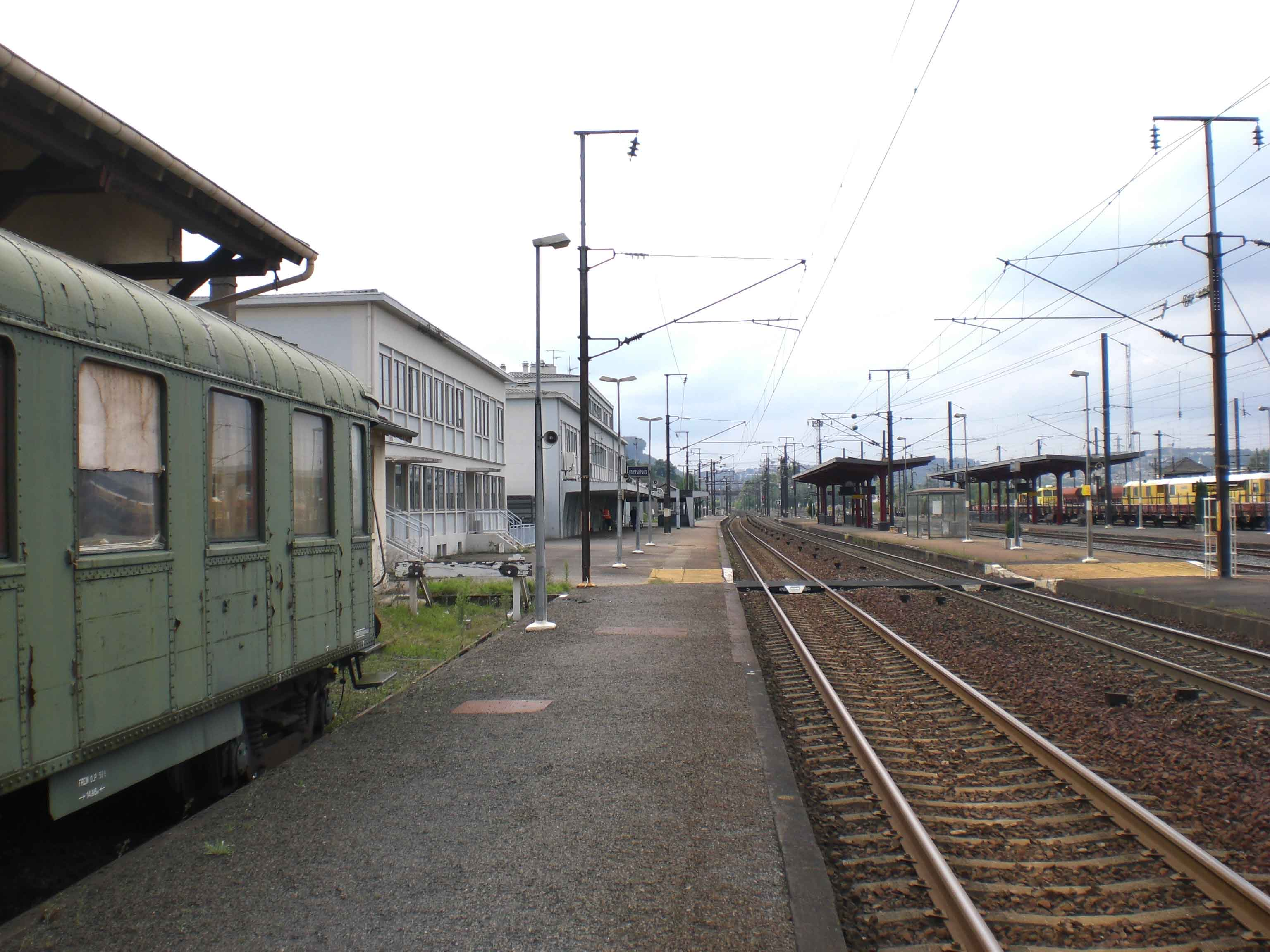
- The railway station in Béning-lès-Saint-Avold

- Coat of arms
- Location of Béning-lès-Saint-Avold
- Location within France Location within Grand Est
- Coordinates: 49°07′58″N 6°50′24″E
- Country: France
- Region: Grand Est
- Department: Moselle
- Arrondissement: Forbach-Boulay-Moselle
- Canton: Freyming-Merlebach
- Intercommunality: Freyming-Merlebach

Government
  - Mayor (2020–2026): Simone Ramsaier
- Area^{1}: 3.69 km^{2} (1.42 sq mi)
- Highest elevation: 337 m (1,106 ft)
- Lowest elevation: 202 m (663 ft)
- Population (2023): 1,095
  - Density: 297/km^{2} (769/sq mi)
- Time zone: UTC+01:00 (CET)
  - Summer (DST): UTC+02:00 (CEST)
- INSEE/Postal code: 57061 /57800
- ^{1} French Land Register data, which excludes lakes, ponds, glaciers > 1 km^{2} (0.386 sq mi or 247 acres) and river estuaries.

Béning-lès-Saint-Avold (French pronunciation: [benɛ̃ lɛ sɛ̃.t‿avɔld], literally Béning near Saint-Avold; German: Beningen bei Sankt Avold) is a commune in the Moselle department in Grand Est in northeastern France.

== Population ==
Historical population
Year	Pop.	±% p.a.
1968	1,203	—
1975	1,328	+1.42%
1982	1,368	+0.42%
1990	1,256	−1.06%
1999	1,231	−0.22%
2007	1,226	−0.05%
2012	1,216	−0.16%
2017	1,140	−1.28%
2023	1,095	−0.67%
Source: INSEE

== See also ==
- Communes of the Moselle department
