= Saarbrücken (district) =

Coordinates: 49°15′N 7°00′E

- District
- Flag Coat of arms
- Country: Germany
- State: Saarland
- Founded: 1816
- Capital: Saarbrücken

Government
  - District admin.: Peter Gillo (SPD)

Area
  - Total: 410.62 km^{2} (158.54 sq mi)

Population (31 December 2024)
  - Total: 333,149
  - Density: 811.33/km^{2} (2,101.3/sq mi)
- Time zone: UTC+01:00 (CET)
  - Summer (DST): UTC+02:00 (CEST)
- Vehicle registration: SB (Völklingen: VK)
- Website: regionalverband-saarbruecken.de

The Regionalverband Saarbrücken is a Kommunalverband besonderer Art, an integration of a district (Kreis) and a district-free city. It is located in the south of the Saarland, Germany. Neighboring districts are Saarlouis, Neunkirchen, Saar-Pfalz, and Forbach-Boulay-Moselle and Sarreguemines in the French département Moselle.

== History ==
The district Saarbrücken was originally created in 1816. In 1974, the district and the district-free city Saarbrücken were merged, and the new administrative body was named Stadtverband Saarbrücken. Although it's not a district like others, most of its administrative tasks are the same as those of a district.

On November 21, 2007, the governing majority of the CDU in the parliament of Saarland passed a law which transformed the Stadtverband Saarbrücken into the Regionalverband Saarbrücken on January 1, 2008. The most striking change by this transformation was the introduction of the Kooperationsrat, a council of officials of the towns and municipalities which exercises some of the powers of Municipal corporation alongside the district council (Regionalversammlung, the local equivalent of the Kreistag). As the directly elected Regionalversammlung represents the population, while the members of the Kooperationsrat are picked by the towns or municipalities which they represent, there is a debate whether the competences of the not-directly-elected Kooperationsrat infringe on the constitutional right of the directly elected Regionalversammlung to exert all powers of Municipal corporation. (Note: Regionalverband Saarbrücken#Geschichte (in German), Retrieved July 12, 2013)

== Geography ==
The river Saar flows through the district, through the city Saarbrücken in the center of the district.

== Coat of arms ==
The original district had no coat of arms, the Regionalverband uses a coat derived from that of the Counts of Nassau-Saarbrücken. The silver lion is taken from the County of Saarbrücken, the golden lion is the lion of Nassau.

== Towns and municipalities ==
Clickable map of towns and municipalities in the district

Towns
1. Friedrichsthal
2. Püttlingen
3. Saarbrücken
4. Sulzbach
5. Völklingen
Municipalities
1. Großrosseln
2. Heusweiler
3. Kleinblittersdorf
4. Quierschied
5. Riegelsberg

== Politics ==
The bodies of the district Regionalverband are the administrator Regionalverbandsdirektor, the district council Regionalversammlung and the additional council Kooperationsrat, which is mainly composed of officials of the towns and municipalities. (Note: Regionalverband Saarbrücken#Politik (in German), Retrieved July 12, 2013)

=== District administration ===
On January 1, 2008, Ulf Huppert (FDP) became Beauftragter für das Amt des Regionalverbandsdirektors, temporarily acting as Regionalverbandsdirektor. (Note: Regionalverband Saarbrücken#Regionalverbandsdirektor (in German), Retrieved July 12, 2013)

The first ever election of the Regionalverbandsdirektor was held on June 7, 2009. As no candidate gained an absolute majority in the first round, run-off elections were held On June 21, 2009, which were won by Peter Gillo (SPD) with 60.22%, with Rainer Grün (CDU) taking 39.78% of the votes. Gillo beat Grün in all towns and municipalities except Püttlingen. The turnout rate of the run-off elections was just 21.2%.

=== District council (Regionalversammlung) ===
CDU	33.0%	16 seats
SPD	31.9%	15 seats
Die Linke	10.3%	5 seats
GRÜNE	8.3%	4 seats
AFD	5.6%	2 seats
FDP	3.4%	1 seat
PIRATEN	2.9%	1 seat
NPD	2.1%	1 seat
FW/BB Saarbrücken	1.7%	-
Saarland für Alle	0.8%	-
total	100%	45 seats

(Result of the elections of 2014)

== International relations ==
Saarbrücken is a fellow member of the Eurodistrict SaarMoselle.

=== International partnerships ===
Saarbrücken has a partnership with:

- Province of Agrigento, Italy
- Kayseri, Turkey
- (United States) Lehigh County, Pennsylvania, USA
- Malatya, Turkey
