= Rosbruck =

- Commune
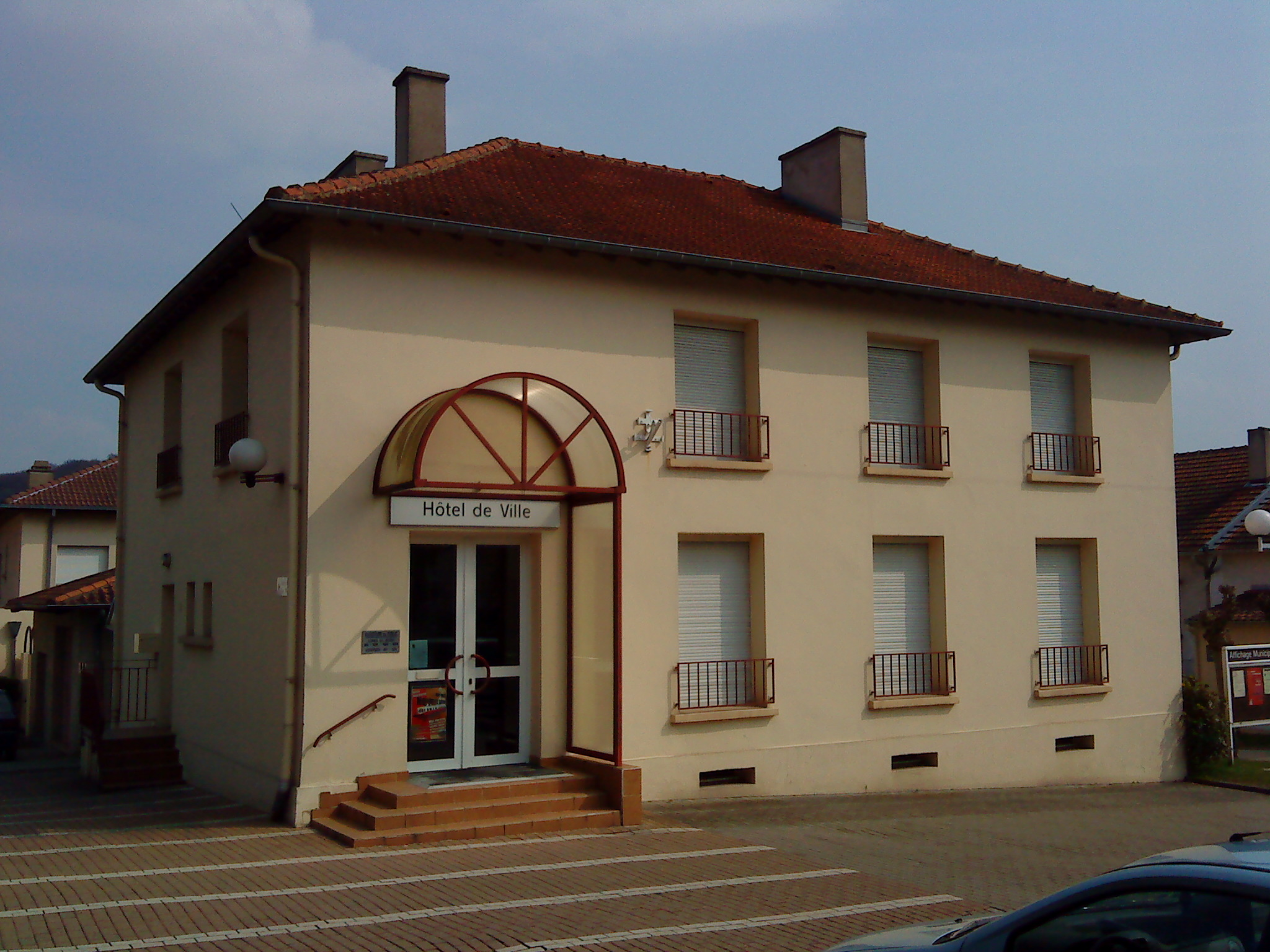
- The town hall in Rosbruck

- Coat of arms
- Location of Rosbruck
- Location within France Location within Grand Est
- Coordinates: 49°09′34″N 6°51′06″E
- Country: France
- Region: Grand Est
- Department: Moselle
- Arrondissement: Forbach-Boulay-Moselle
- Canton: Forbach
- Intercommunality: CA Forbach Porte de France

Government
  - Mayor (2020–2026): Bernard Betker
- Area^{1}: 1.41 km^{2} (0.54 sq mi)
- Highest elevation: 320 m (1,050 ft)
- Lowest elevation: 198 m (650 ft)
- Population (2023): 740
  - Density: 520/km^{2} (1,400/sq mi)
- Time zone: UTC+01:00 (CET)
  - Summer (DST): UTC+02:00 (CEST)
- INSEE/Postal code: 57596 /57800
- ^{1} French Land Register data, which excludes lakes, ponds, glaciers > 1 km^{2} (0.386 sq mi or 247 acres) and river estuaries.

Rosbruck (French pronunciation: [ʁɔsbʁyk]; German: Rossbrücken; Lorraine Franconian: Rossbrigg) is a commune in the Moselle department in Grand Est in north-eastern France.

== Twin towns ==
- Großrosseln (Germany)

== See also ==
- Communes of the Moselle department
