= 275th Infantry Regiment (United States) =

Infantry Regiment of the United States

- Active: 1943-1945
- Country: United States
- Branch: United States Army
- Type: Infantry
- Size: Regiment
- Nickname: "The Eagle Regiment"
- Engagements: World War II; Rhineland; Ardennes-Alsace; Central Europe

Commanders
- Colonel: Charles S. Pettee

The 275th Infantry Regiment was an infantry regiment of the United States Army during World War II. The 275th Infantry Regiment was deployed to the European Theater of Operations during the war as part of the 70th Infantry Division.

== World War II ==
The 275th Infantry Regiment was activated on July 15, 1943 at Camp Adair in Oregon.^{238} The regiment was originally commanded by Colonel Peter T. Wolfe in 1943, however by August 20, 1944 the regiment was commanded by Colonel Charles S. Peetee.^{3,59}^{238} The regiment was nicknamed "The Eagle Regiment".

The 275th Infantry Regiment trained at Camp Adair until July 29, 1944 when it was transferred to Fort Leonard Wood in Missouri.^{238} The 275th Infantry Regiment was eventually moved to Camp Myles Standish in Taunton, Massachusetts on November 19, 1944 where it awaited deployment to the European Theatre of Operations.^{23}^{238}

The 275th Infantry Regiment landed in Marseille on December 15, 1944 where it was initially attached to the 45th Infantry Division. The 275th eventually joined the rest of the 70th Infantry Division where it fought as part of Task Force Herren under Brig. Gen. Thomas W. Herren at Brumath, Bischwiller, and the low Vosges before taking part in Operation Nordwind . The regiment later took part in operations near Philippsbourg, Falkenberg Ridge, and Schwarzenberg. The 275th Infantry Regiment later occupied the Saar Basin until May 7, 1945.^{140}

The 275th Infantry Regiment was deactivated on October 11, 1945 at Camp Kilmer with the rest of the 70th Infantry Division upon its return to the United States.^{238}

== Commanders ==
- Colonel Charles S. Peetee.^{59}
- Lieutenant Colonel "Jack" Malloy^{61}

== Campaigns ==
- Ardennes-Alsace Campaign^{238}
- Rhineland Campaign^{238}
- Central Europe Campaign^{238}

== See also ==
- 70th Infantry Division (United States)
- Seventh United States Army
- Third United States Army
