= John E. Dahlquist =

United States Army general

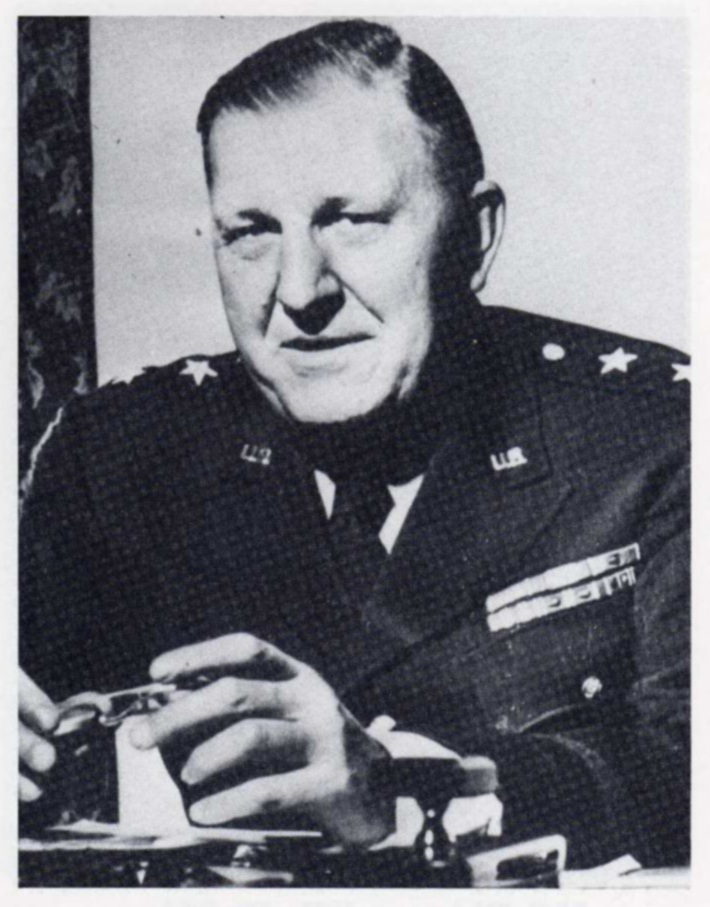
- Born: 12 March 1896; Minneapolis, Minnesota, U.S.
- Died: 30 June 1975 (aged 79); Fort Lauderdale, Florida, U.S.
- Burial place: Arlington National Cemetery, Virginia, United States
- Military career
- Allegiance: United States
- Branch: United States Army
- Service years: 1917–1956
- Rank: General
- Service number: 0-7120
- Unit: Infantry Branch
- Commands: 70th Infantry Division; 36th Infantry Division; 1st Infantry Division; V Corps; Fourth Army; Continental Army Command; Army Field Forces
- Conflicts: World War II; Cold War
- Awards: Distinguished Service Cross; Army Distinguished Service Medal (2); Silver Star; Legion of Merit; Bronze Star (2)

General John Ernest Dahlquist (12 March 1896 – 30 June 1975) was a senior United States Army officer. In the course of his military career, Dahlquist commanded three different army divisions, commanded at the corps and field army level and rose to the rank of four-star general. He is well known for making a series of poor tactical decisions which led to the entrapment of the Lost Battalion, which was surrounded by German forces in the Vosges Mountains on 24 October 1944, subsequently leading to the rescue operation by the 442nd RCT and its becoming the most highly decorated unit in the history of the United States Armed Forces.

== Early life and military career ==
Born on 12 March 1896, in Minneapolis, Minnesota, the youngest of four children, Dahlquist's parents were immigrants from Dalsland, Sweden. He graduated from the University of Minnesota and received a direct commission as a second lieutenant into the Infantry Branch of the United States Army in August 1917, shortly after the American entry into World War I on 6 April 1917. Unable to serve overseas, he served in the Allied occupation of the Rhineland after the war.

Remaining in the army during the interwar period he returned to the United States and served as an instructor at the U.S. Army Infantry School from 1924 to 1928. After graduating from the U.S. Army Command and General Staff School in 1931, he was assigned to the Philippines. From 1935 to 1936 he was a student at the U.S. Army War College, serving on the U.S. Army General Staff, Personnel Division after graduation.

== World War II ==
With the American entry into World War II in December 1941, Dahlquist was sent to England and assigned as deputy chief of staff to Major General Dwight David Eisenhower in early 1942, and, later that year, with the one-star rank of brigadier general, became the assistant division commander (ADC) of the 76th Infantry Division. In June 1943, promoted to the two-star rank of major general, Dahlquist became the first commanding general (CG) of the 70th Infantry Division, becoming one of the youngest division commanders in the U.S. Army. In July 1944, he took command of the 36th Infantry Division, a National Guard formation from Texas that had fought in many difficult battles in the Italian Campaign under Major General Frederick Walker and had recently taken part in Operation Dragoon, the Allied invasion of Southern France. It was during this period that saw Dahlquist receive the first of two Army Distinguished Service Medals. The citation for the first Army DSM reads:

The President of the United States of America, authorized by Act of Congress 9 July 1918, takes pleasure in presenting the Army Distinguished Service Medal to Major General John Ernest Dahlquist (ASN: 0-7120), United States Army, for exceptionally meritorious and distinguished services to the Government of the United States, in a duty of great responsibility as Commanding General of the 36th Infantry Division during the period from 14 July to 14 September 1944.

Dahlquist was criticized for his overuse of the Japanese-American 442nd Regimental Combat Team (442nd RCT), which had been attached to his 36th Division. Many believed his poor decisions led to the 442nd RCT becoming the most highly decorated unit in the history of the United States Armed Forces. Over a third of the men in the 442nd were either killed or wounded when Dahlquist ordered the unit to rescue another unit that had been surrounded by the enemy. It is not the surviving Nisei soldiers of the 442nd but their officers (most of them non Japanese-American) who are most often quoted in criticism of Dahlquist.

On 24 October 1944, the 1st and 2nd Battalions of the 141st Infantry Regiment, part of Dahlquist's 36th Division, moved to secure the right flank of the 3rd Division near the French town of St-Die. When the German forces counterattacked, the 1st Battalion was separated and cut off. After two days of attempted rescue by the other two battalions of the 141st Infantry, Dahlquist sent in the 442nd RCT, which had borne the brunt of the 36th Division's fighting for the previous eight days. The 442nd would suffer 800 casualties, including 121 dead, during the five days it took to rescue 211 men of the 1st Battalion, 141st Infantry. Major General Lucian Truscott, commanding the VI Corps (under which unit the 36th Division was serving), considered relieving him of his command.

On 12 November, General Dahlquist announced he wanted to review the 442nd, to thank them for what they had done. When the battered unit appeared, Dahlquist grew irritated at their sparse numbers, ignorant at how much they had sacrificed.

— Christopher C. Meyers, The War: Vosges Mountains (The Lost Battalion), PBS.org

Dahlquist continued to lead the 36th Division throughout the campaign in Western Europe. On May 8, 1945, Victory in Europe Day, Hermann Göring surrendered to Brigadier General Robert I. Stack, the 36th Infantry Division's assistant division commander (ADC), after a ceasefire was declared between the German Army Group G and the U.S. Seventh Army. Stack transported Göring to the division command post. Because he spoke German, Dahlquist dismissed his translator, and so it was Dahlquist who became the first person to question Göring. Press photos of Dahlquist and Stack, in seemingly casual conversation with Göring, were released for publication in the United States and resulted in criticism of Dahlquist from the American public and from General Eisenhower, the Supreme Allied Commander in the European Theater of Operations (ETO).

== Postwar ==
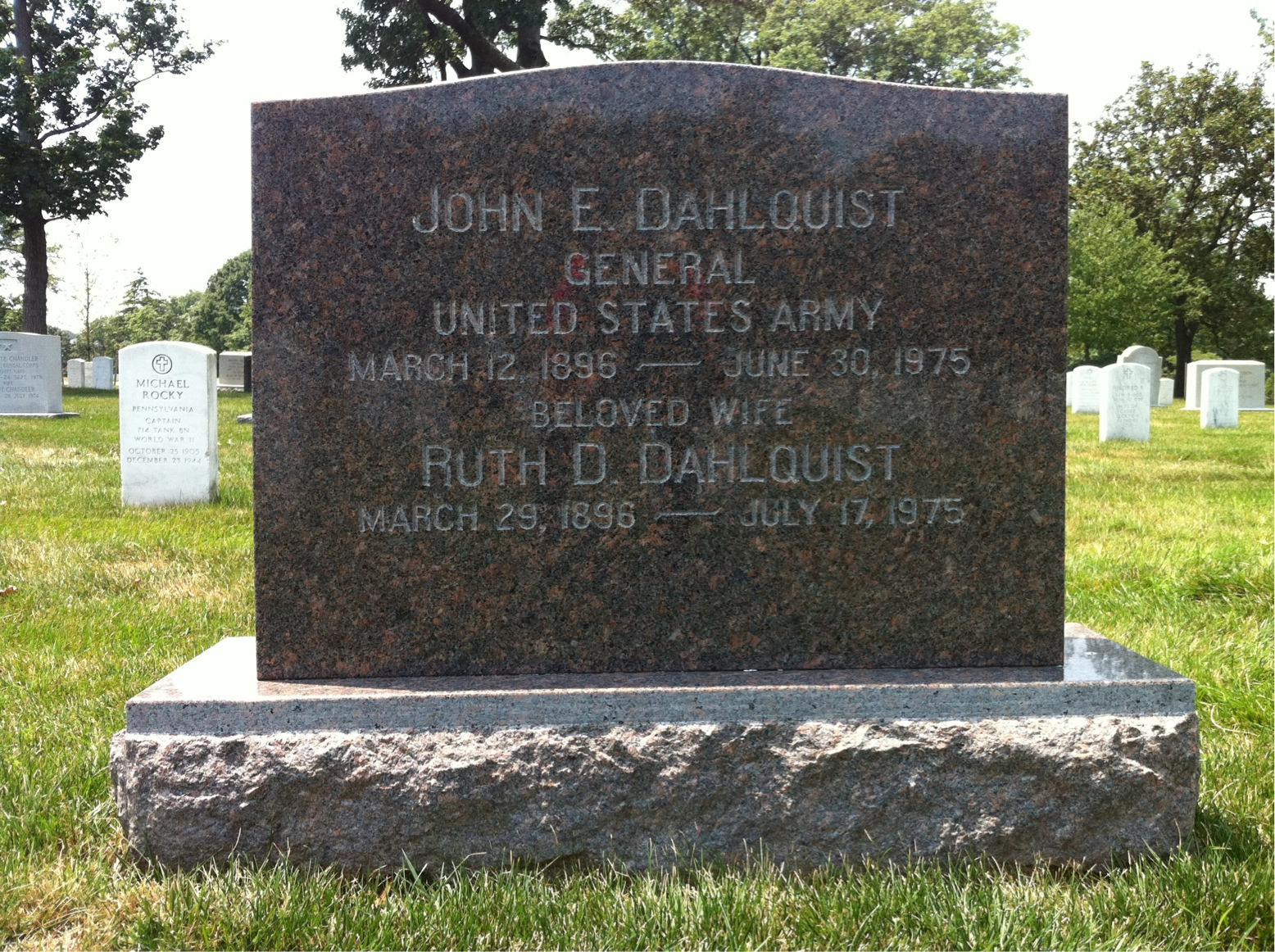
The grave of General John E. Dahlquist at Arlington National Cemetery.

Following the war, Dahlquist returned to the United States, serving in various administrative and personnel jobs. He took command of his third division, the 1st Infantry, in 1949. This was followed by command of V Corps from 1952 to 1953 and the Fourth Army in 1953. He then served as Chief of Army Field Forces from 1953 to 1955, during which he was promoted to the four-star rank of general on 18 August 1954. He finished his career as Commander-in-Chief, Continental Army Command, retiring in 1956, and receiving his second Army DSM for his services during a two-and-a-half year period, with the medal's citation reading:

The President of the United States of America, authorized by Act of Congress 9 July 1918, takes pleasure in presenting a Bronze Oak Leaf Cluster in lieu of a Second Award of the Army Distinguished Service Medal to General John Ernest Dahlquist, United States Army, for exceptionally meritorious and distinguished services to the Government of the United States, in a duty of great responsibility from 24 August 1953 to 29 February 1956.

Dahlquist died on 30 June 1975, aged 79, and was buried in Arlington National Cemetery, Virginia.

== Marriage ==
Dahlquist was married to Ruth D. Dahlquist, who was born 17 days after him and died 17 days after him. She was buried with him at Arlington National Cemetery. They had a son, Donald John Dahlquist, born on 9 March 1932, who died on 22 November 1993, and was buried in Arlington next to his parents. Dahlquist had two grandchildren, John William and Donette Ruth.

== Awards and decorations ==
Dahlquist's awards and decorations include the Distinguished Service Cross, the Army Distinguished Service Medal, the Silver Star, the Legion of Merit and the Bronze Star. In 1954, he received an honorary Master of Arts from the University of Minnesota.

- Distinguished Service Cross
- Army Distinguished Service Medal
- Silver Star
- Legion of Merit
- Bronze Star
- World War I Victory Medal
- Army of Occupation of Germany Medal
- American Defense Service Medal
- American Campaign Medal
- European-African-Middle Eastern Campaign Medal
- World War II Victory Medal
- Army of Occupation Medal
- National Defense Service Medal

== See also ==
- Lost Battalion (World War II)

Military offices
Preceded by Newly activated organization	Commanding General 70th Infantry Division; 1943–1944	Succeeded by Allison J. Barnett
Preceded by Fred L. Walker	Commanding General 36th Infantry Division; 1944–1945	Succeeded by Post deactivated
Preceded by Ralph Canine	Commanding General 1st Infantry Division; 1949–1951	Succeeded by Thomas S. Timberman
Preceded by Boniface Campbell	Commanding General V Corps; 1951–1953	Succeeded by Ira P. Swift
Preceded by LeRoy Lutes	Commanding General Fourth Army; 1953–1955	Succeeded by Samuel T. Williams
