= 274th Infantry Regiment (United States) =

Military unit during World War II of the United States Army

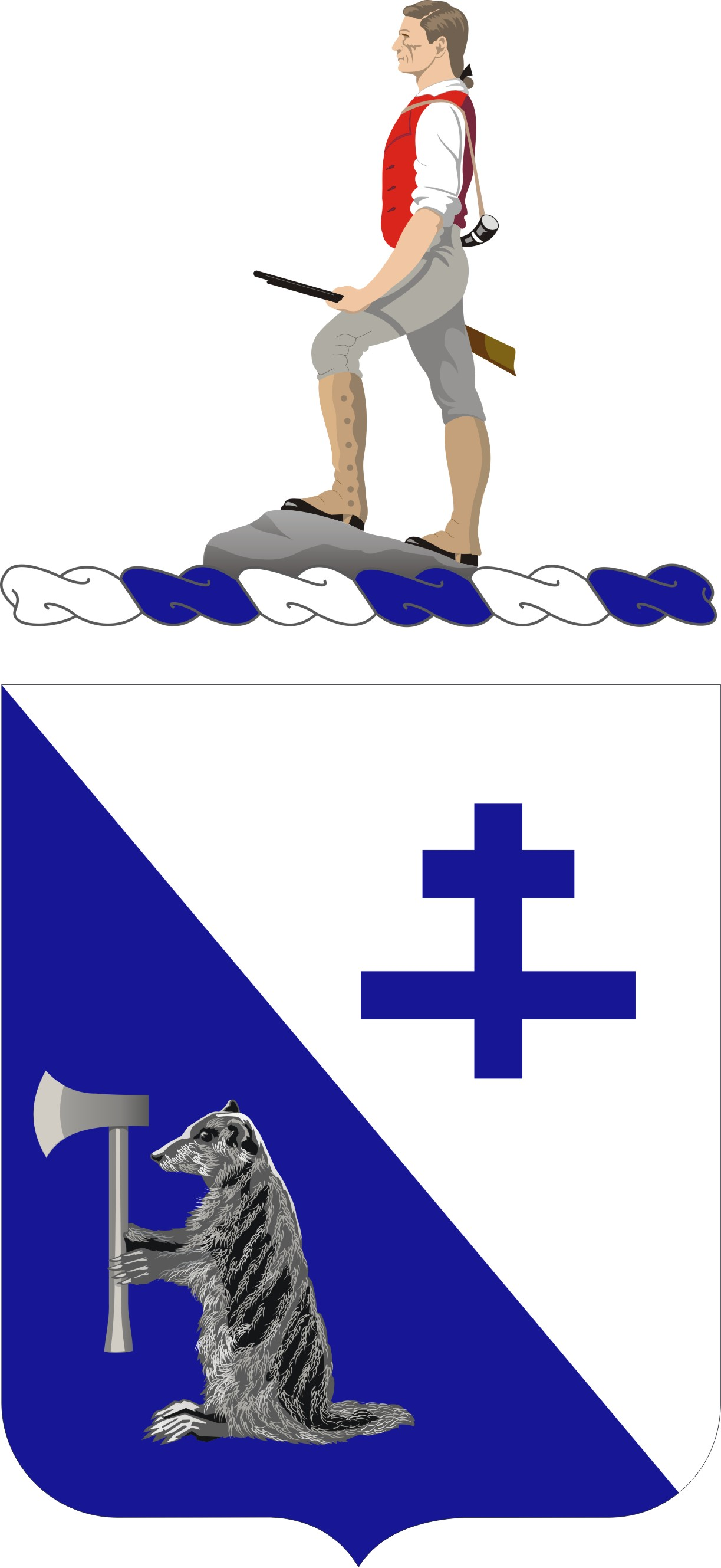
- Coat of Arms of the 274th Infantry Regiment
- Active: 1943-1945
- Country: United States
- Branch: United States Army
- Type: Infantry
- Size: Regiment
- Nickname: "The Battle Axe Regiment"
- Motto: "L'Avant Garde"
- Engagements: World War II: Rhineland; Ardennes-Alsace; Central Europe

Commanders
- Colonel: Samuel Glenn Conley

Insignia
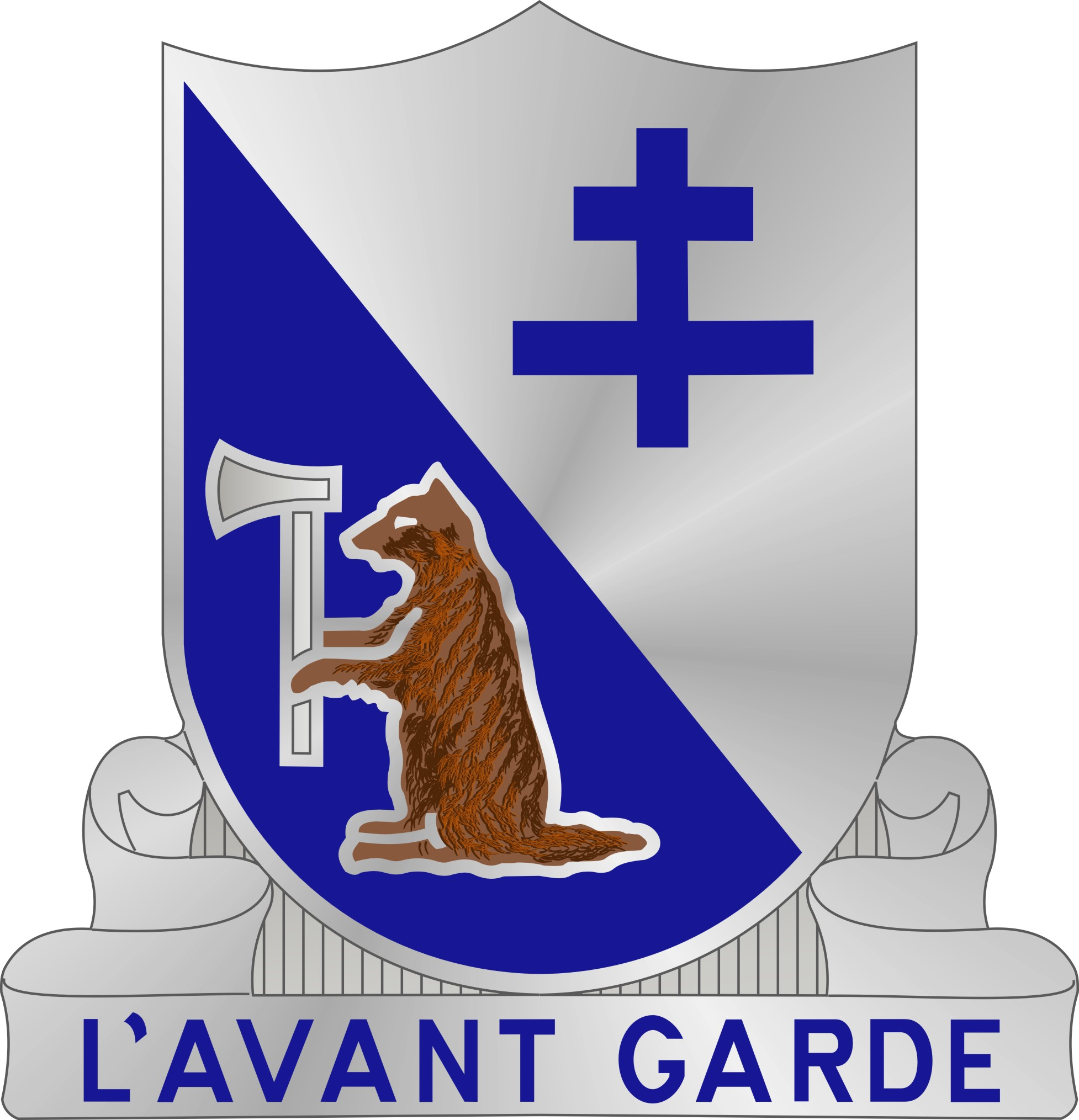
- Distinctive unit insignia

The 274th Infantry Regiment was an infantry regiment of the United States Army during World War II. The 274th Infantry Regiment was deployed to the European Theater of Operations as part of the 70th Infantry Division which took part in the Rhineland Offensive, the Ardennes Offensive, the Central Europe Campaign, and the occupation of Germany.

== World War II ==
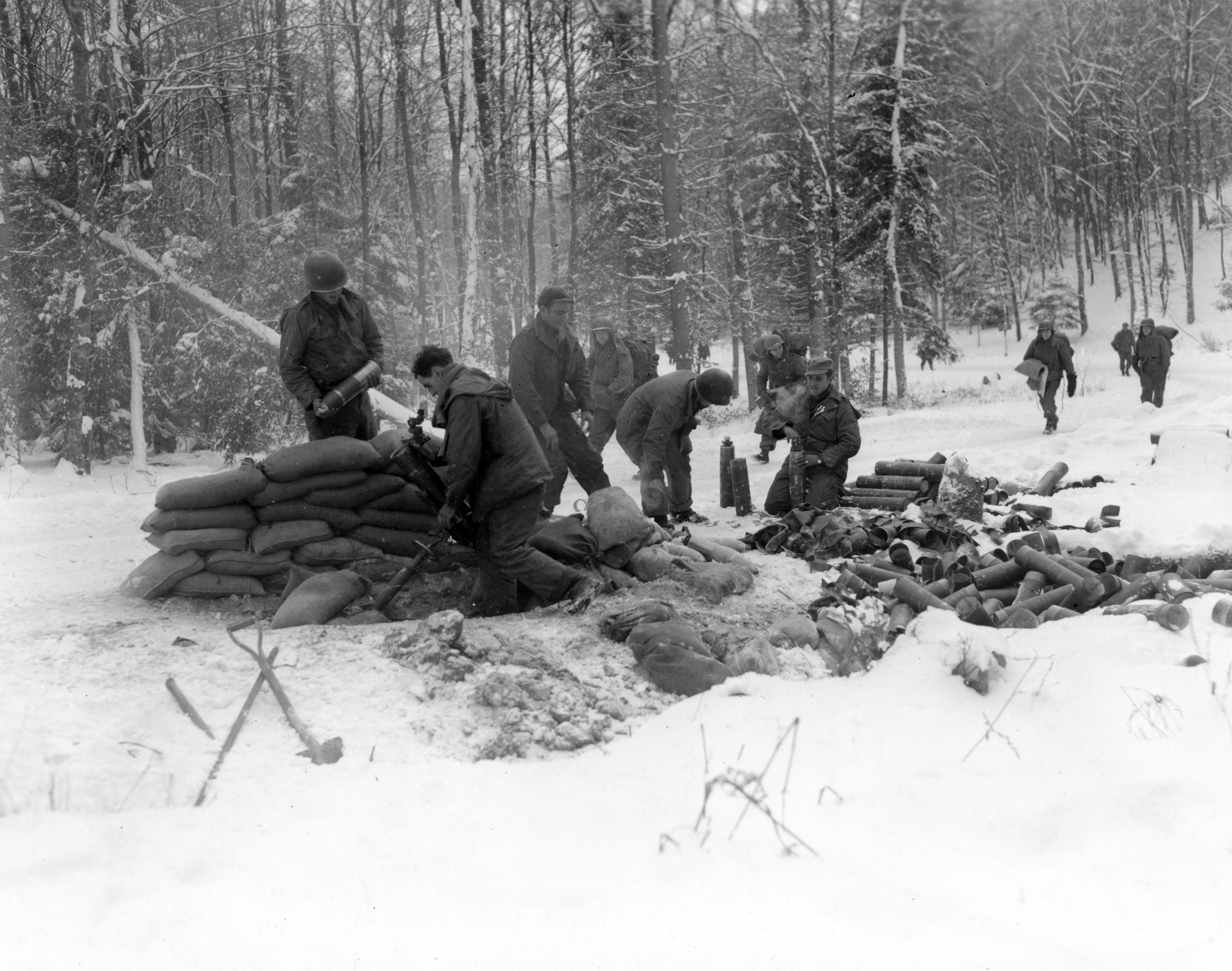
83rd Chemical Mortar Battalion, 274th Infantry Regiment, 70th Infantry Division. Wimmenau, France. January 25, 1945.

The 274th Infantry Regiment was activated on June 15, 1943, at Camp Adair in Oregon as part of the 70th Infantry Division. The regiment was commanded by Colonel Samuel Glenn Conley of Van Wert, Ohio. The regiment moved to Fort Leonard Wood in Missouri for further training on July 29, 1944. The regiment was later moved with the rest of the division to Camp Myles Standish in Massachusetts for departure on November 18, 1944. The regiment landed in Marseille, France on December 1, 1944, where it took part in the Rhineland Offensive, the Battle of the Bulge, and the Central Europe Campaign, most notably at the Battle of Forbach, the Battle of Wingen-sur-Moder, and the Battle of Saarbrücken during the latter stages of Operation Northwind.

The 274th Infantry Regiment was attached to the following divisions in 1945 during the Rhineland, Ardennes-Alsace, and Central Europe Campaigns:

- 79th Infantry Division: January 1–2, 1945,
- 45th Infantry Division: January 3–17, 1945.
- 103rd Infantry Division: January 17–22, 1945.
- 45th Infantry Division: January 22–29, 1945.
- 100th Infantry Division: January 29 – February 5, 1945.

The 274th Infantry Regiment was deactivated on October 11, 1945, at Camp Kilmer, New Jersey along with the rest of the division following its return to the United States.

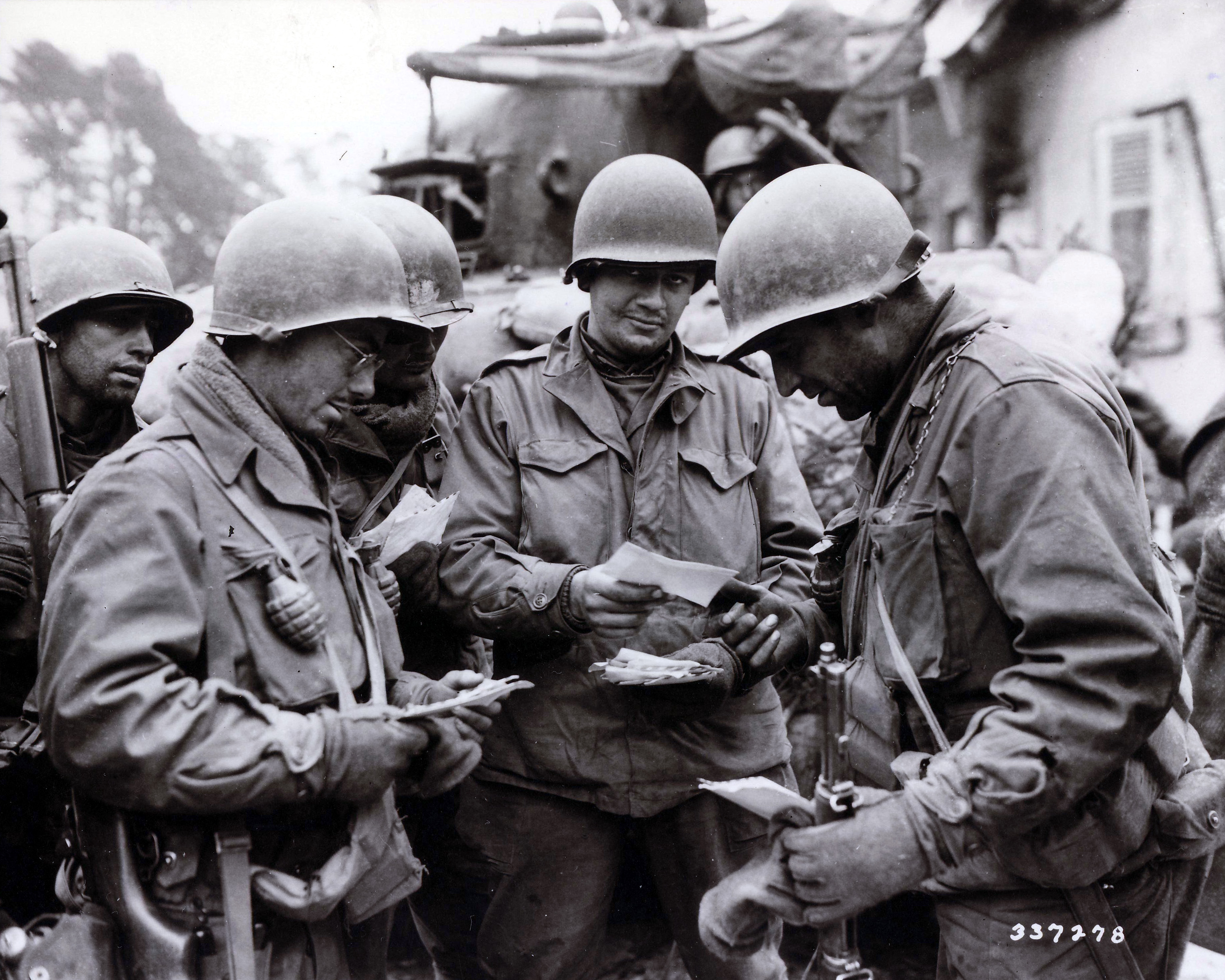
"Mail call for 70th Division Infantrymen who fought to retake the French town of Wingen after the Nazi counterattack gained control of the town". January 7, 1945.

== Command ==
=== Commander ===
- Colonel Samuel "Sam" Glenn Conley.

=== Executive Officers ===
- Lieutenant Colonel John R. McCann.

=== Staff Officers ===
- Captain Jay C. Underwood - Battalion S1 (Service).
- Major Paul J. Durbin - Battalion S2 (Intelligence).
- Major Walter W. Greenhalgh - Battalion S3 (Operations).
- Captain Lewis M. Botterff - Battalion S4 (Supply & Logistics).

=== Battalion Commanders ===
- Lieutenant Colonel James T. Willis - 1st Battalion.
- Lieutenant Colonel Wallace R. Cheves - 2nd Battalion.
- Lieutenant Colonel Karl S. Landstorm - 3rd Battalion.

=== Company Commanders ===
- Headquarters Company: Captain John R. Clark.
- Service Company: Captain Herbert F. Wickham.
- Cannon Company: Captain Roy H. Meiners.
- Anti-Tank Company: First Lieutenant Ray Stieff.
- Medical Detachment: Major William F. Gassaway.
- Company A: William R. Hughes.
- Company B: Wilson H. DeCamp.
- Company C: George S. Blanchard.
- Company D: Brandon H. Kellogg.
- Company E: Eugene A. Sisson.
- Company F: Robert J. Davenport.
- Company G: Fred J. Cassidy.
- Company H: James D. Kidder.
- Company I: Edwin B. Keith.
- Company K: Francis L. Thompson.
- Company L: Ernest C. Murphy.
- Company M: Charles E. McFarland.

== Awards ==
The 2nd Battalion, 274th Infantry Regiment received a Presidential Unit Citation for action at Wingen-sur-Moder in France from January 4–7, 1945. Later, while attached to the 45th Infantry Division the 274th Infantry Regiment received a letter of commendation from the division's commander.

== Notable people ==
- Samuel Glenn Conley, was the commanding officer of the 274th Infantry Regiment, he later fought in the Korean War. By the end of his military career Conley held the rank of Brigadier General. He is buried in Arlington National Cemetery
- Raymond E. Evans, Staff Sergeant of Company G. Awarded the Silver Star for actions on February 21, 1945, near Etzling and Stiring-Wendel. Evans actions led to the surrender of 32 German soldiers and their subsequent capture
- Felix Benjamin Treviño, San Antonio city council member and political official. Treviño served in Company E of the 274th Infantry Regiment during the war and later was a prominent community leader in San Antonio
- William E. Lehman, Staff Sergeant of Company E, 2nd Battalion, 274th Infantry Regiment was posthumously awarded the Distinguished Service Cross for covering a grenade with his own body after accidentally pulling the pin and safety catch, in the process saving the lives of five of his comrades at the cost of his own

== See also ==
- 70th Infantry Division (United States)
- Seventh United States Army
- Third United States Army
