= 884th Field Artillery Battalion (United States) =

"American Military Unit"

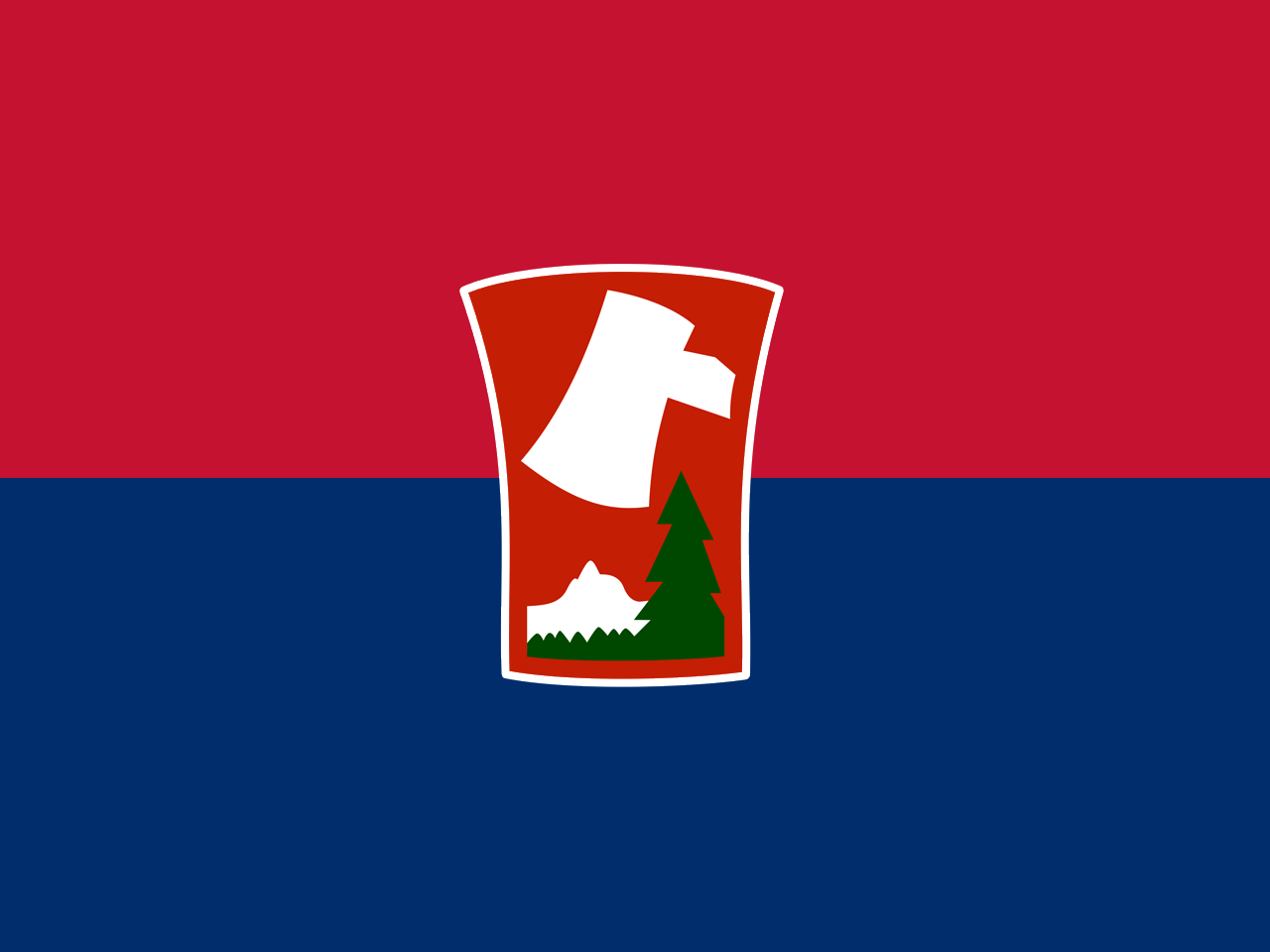
- Flag of the United States Army 70th Infantry Division
- Active: 1943-1945
- Country: United States
- Branch: United States Army
- Type: Infantry
- Role: Fire support
- Size: Battalion
- Engagements: World War II: Rhineland; Central Europe

Commanders
- Lieutenant Colonel: John S. Zimmerman
- Major: Walter Alexander Edens
- Major: Will C. Gipple

The 884th Field Artillery Battalion (often abbreviated as 884th FAB) was an artillery battalion in the United States Army. The unit was activated during World War II at Camp Adair on June 15, 1943, the battalion saw action in the European Theater of Operations as part of the 70th Infantry Division, at the time a part of the Seventh United States Army. The unit was deactivated on October 11, 1945, at Camp Kilmer, New Jersey along with the rest of the division following its return to the United States.

== World War II ==
The 884th Field Artillery Battalion was activated on June 15, 1943, at Camp Adair in Oregon. The battalion was composed of four artillery batteries of M101 howitzers (105mm) with D Tractors, and one service and logistics battery. The battalion was commanded by Lieutenant Colonel John S. Zimmerman of Belleville, New Jersey.

From June 15, 1943, until July 25, 1944, the battalion would train at Camp Adair before being sent to Fort Leonard Wood in Missouri. The battalion went through further artillery drills and training at Fort Leonard Wood until December 18, 1944. The battalion, along with the rest of the 70th Infantry Division was later sent to Camp Myles Standish in Taunton, Massachusetts while waiting to be sent overseas.

The 884th departed Boston on January 8, 1945, aboard the SS Mariposa and arrived at Marseille in southern France by January 18, 1945. From January 18 to February 4, 1945, the battalion was garrisoned at Marseille. The battalion moved to the frontlines from February 4–7. The battalion's first day of combat was on February 7, 1945, near Ohlungen where it provided fire support for the 276th Infantry Regiment which had encountered two German tanks or self-propelled artillery, along with a company of German infantry near the border of France and Germany. During the altercation the battalion fired 376 rounds of ammunition. It should be clarified that the 884th often provided direct fire support to the 276th Infantry Regiment, nicknamed the "Bloody Axe Regiment", as the two units were part of a combat team which supported one another.

From February to March the battalion took part in supporting infantry elements of the 70th Division and its capture of both Forbach and Saarbrücken during the cleanup stages of Operation Nordwind. The battalion would eventually garrison in Kronberg im Taunus from April–May before being moved to Gaubivingen (sometimes spelled as Gaubivinzen) in Alsace–Lorraine from March 1–14. The battalion later moved to Petite-Rosselle from March 15–25. From March 25 to August 1, 1945, the battalion was garrisoned in various cities in western Germany including; Ramstein-Miesenbach, Schweppenhausen, Bad Kreuznach, Bad Soden-Salmünster, and lastly in Gelnhausen.

Beginning on April 1, 1945, the 884th was placed in its first non-combative role as military police and security forces for the military government of the Rhine. Various batteries of the battalion were scattered around the Bad Kreuznach district in Rhineland-Palatinate. The battalion Headquarters Battery was garrisoned in Hackenheim, Battery A at Pfaffen-Schwabenheim, Battery B at Hochstätten, Battery C at Alsenz, and the Service Company at Wonsheim. The battalion later moved back to Gelnhausen in August 1945 where they would be garrisoned until the end of their occupation service. The batteries were located in the following towns: Headquarters in Wallrabenstein, Battery A in Esch, Battery B in Burbach, Battery C in Bad Camberg (Würges), and the Service Battery in Wörsdorf. On August 31, 1945, the battalion consisted of 38 officers, 3 warrant officers, and 517 enlisted men.

By August 1945 the battalion had started to send officers and enlisted men home with various field artillery battalions, and regiments as American servicemen were slowly mustered out of service. The 884th was officially deactivated on October 11, 1945, at Camp Kilmer, New Jersey after the entire 70th Infantry Division returned to the United States.

== Command ==
=== Commander ===
- Lieutenant Colonel John S. Zimmerman.

=== Executive Officers ===
- Major Walter Alexander Edens (until April 13, 1945, transferred to Division HQ).
- Major Will C. Gipple.

=== Staff Officers ===
- Major William S. Ellis - Battalion S3 (Operations).
- Captain Roy G. Zittelman - Battalion S2 (Intelligence).
- Captain Arno H. Denecke - Assistant S3.
- Lieutenant Jo Bailey Howard - Assistant S2.
- Captain George L. Wickersham - Liaison Officer I.
- Captain Woosley Carmal - Liaison Officer II.
- Captain Robert H. Miller - Liaison Officer III.
- Captain Umbert A. Melaragno - Battalion Surgeon.

=== Battery Commanders ===
- Captain John Cooper Godbold - Headquarters Battery.
- Captain Walter J. Hoddinott - Battery A.
- Captain Peter G. Zager - Battery B.
- Captain Douglas M. Johnson - Battery C.
- First Lieutenant William Sikorski - SV (Service) & S4 (Logistics/ Supply).

=== Medical Detachment ===
- Staff Sergeant Vernus L. Loberg.
- Staff Sergeant Alfred P. Pellegrini.

== Casualties ==
The 884th Field Artillery Battalion suffered a total of 10 casualties during the war: 2 enlisted men were killed in action, 6 enlisted men and 1 officer were wounded, and 1 enlisted man was seriously injured in action.

== Battalion newspaper ==
During its occupation of Gelnhausen the 884th Artillery Battalion developed an independent battalion newspaper nicknamed Hot Poop on March 28, 1945. The newspaper was produced by technician fifth grade Edwin Arnowitt and Corporal Jack Little. The newspaper was a four paged daily issue and included six pages on Sunday issues. The newspaper featured comics by Milton Caniff and Bill Mauldin and kept servicemen of the 884th informed on American politics, sports, and the news. The term "hot poop" is an American military slang term used during the Second World War in the Army for gossip or news, similar to the period use of the word scuttlebutt in the United States Navy and United States Marine Corps.

== Notable people ==
- John Cooper Godbold: Godbold was a United States circuit judge from Alabama. Godbold later served in the United States Court of Appeals for the Eleventh Circuit and the United States Court of Appeals for the Fifth Circuit. While serving in the 884th Field Artillery Battalion Godbold served as the Captain of the Headquarters Battery.
- Arno H. Denecke: Denecke was an American jurist from Illinois. During his legal career Denecke was the 37th Chief Justice of the Oregon Supreme Court and later the 73rd Justice of the Oregon Supreme Court. While serving in the 884th Field Artillery Battalion Denecke served as the assistant officer to the battalion's S3 section (Operations).

== See also ==
- 70th Infantry Division (United States)
- Seventh United States Army
- Third United States Army
