= Korean Communications Zone =

Korean Communication Zone (KComZ)
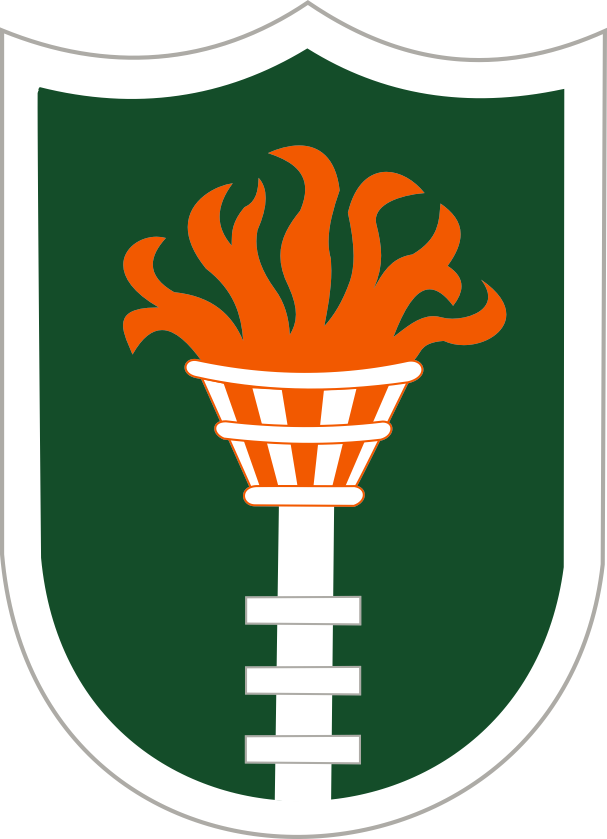
- Active: 21 August 1952 - July 1956
- Disbanded: July 1956
- Country: United States
- Allegiance: United Nations
- Role: Communications Zone
- Size: 34,280 personnel (1953)
- Nickname(s): KComZ
- Decorations: ROK Presidential Unit Citation (1954)

Commanders
- Notable commanders: Maj. Gen. Thomas W. Herren

The Korean Communications Zone, abbreviated to KComZ or KCOMZ, was a military formation of the United States during the Korean War. It had overall responsibility for the communications zone behind the front line including communications, supply, and administration. It also dealt with relations with the South Korean government and care of civilian refugees and prisoners of war.

KComZ was formed in June 1952 as an amalgamation of 2nd and 3rd Logistical Commands, both of which had previously shared responsibility for supply operations in Korea. It became operational on 21 August 1952 and was responsible for military logistical support to UN and South Korean forces, as well as political and economic relations with the South Korean government, the operation of Korean National Railways, and the control of North Korean and Chinese prisoners of war. Following the end of hostilities in Korea in 1953, KComZ became the Eighth US Army Support Command in July 1956 and was later re-designated US Army Area Command and finally the 7th Logistical Command.

The most common unit insignia worn by KComZ personnel depicted an orange flame in a white bracket at the centre of a green shield. A less common variant, also shaped like a shield, depicted the letters KCOMZ diagonally in white on a green background.
