= 70th Infantry Division (United States) =

- 70th Infantry Division shoulder sleeve insignia
- Active: 18 January 1943–11 October 1945 (70th Inf. Div.); 13 February 1952–15 November 1996 (70th Training Div.); 16 November 1996–7 September 2008 (70th Regional Support Command)
- Country: United States
- Branch: United States Army
- Type: Infantry
- Size: Division
- Nickname: Trailblazers (special designation)
- Engagements: World War II; Rhineland; Ardennes-Alsace; Central Europe

Commanders
- Notable commanders: John E. Dahlquist, Allison J. Barnett, Thomas W. Herren, Stanley W. Connelly

Insignia
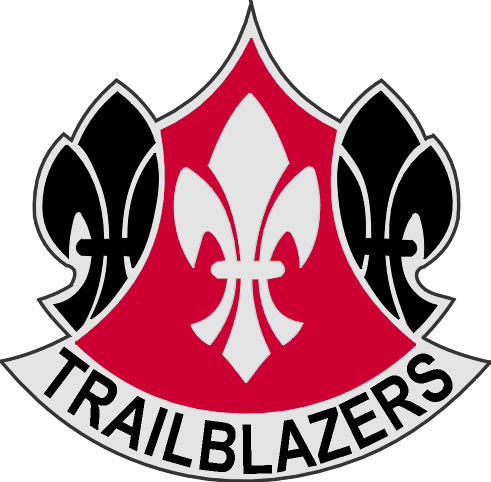
- Distinctive unit insignia

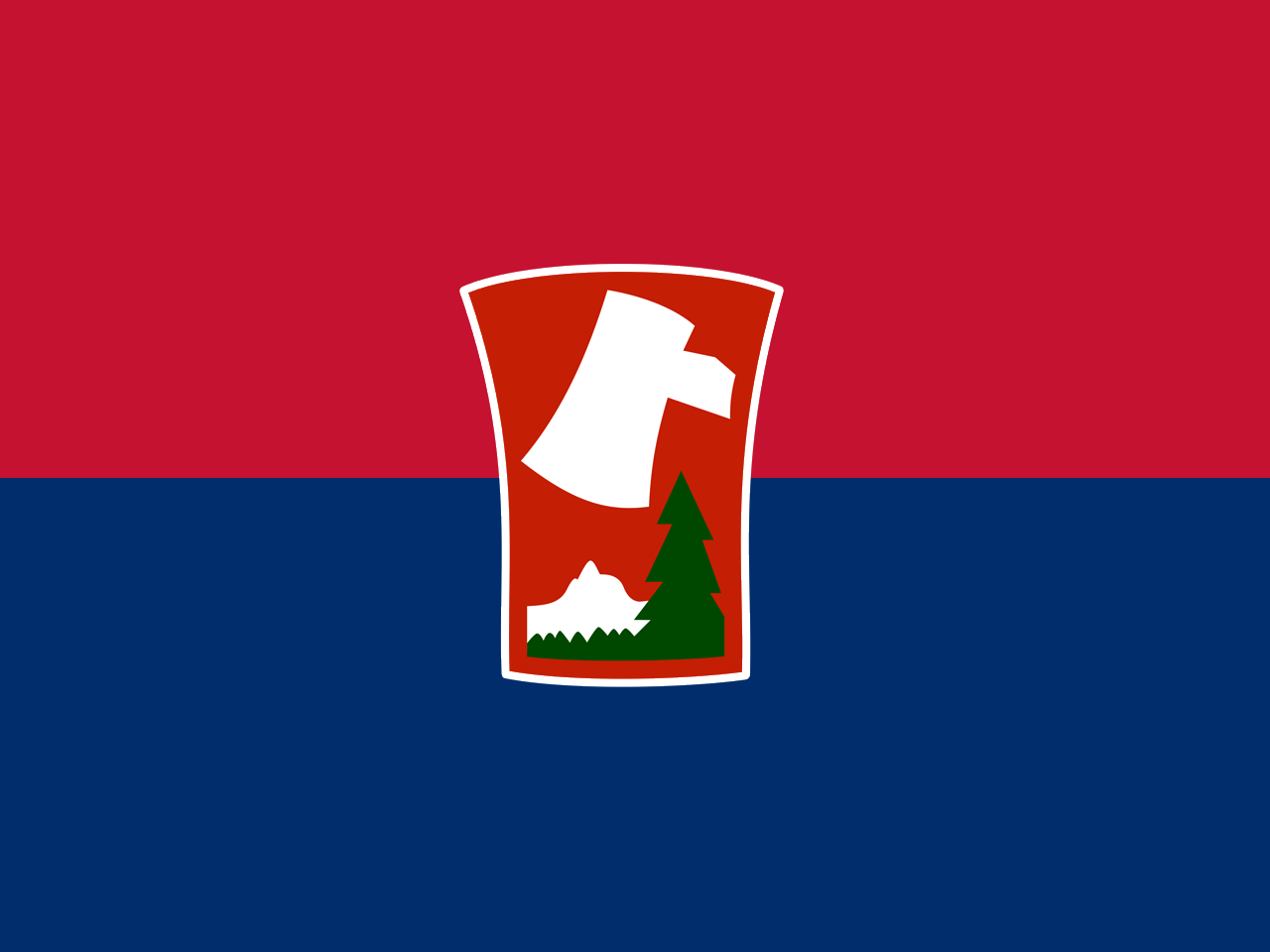
- Flag of the United States Army 70th Infantry Division

The 70th Infantry Division ("Trailblazers") was a unit of the United States Army in World War II, spearheading the Seventh United States Army's drive into Germany, south of Saarbrücken.

Activated at Camp Adair, Oregon, in 1943, the 70th Division served in the European Theater of Operations during the latter part of World War II. The division was inactivated in October 1945 at Camp Kilmer, New Jersey following its return to the United States.

== History ==
=== World War II ===
- Activated: 15 June 1943.
- July 1944 moved to Fort Leonard Wood, Missouri
- Overseas: Task Force Herren-December 1944; Support Troops-8 January 1945.
- Campaigns: Ardennes-Alsace, Rhineland, Central Europe.
- Days of combat: 86.
- Distinguished Unit Citations: 1.
- Awards: DSC-12; SS-228 (4 clusters); LM-7; SM-16; BS-430 (14 clusters); Military Cross (UK)-1; AM-20; Meritorious Unit Citation-3.
- Commanders: Major General John E. Dahlquist (June 1943 – July 1944), Major General. Allison J. Barnett (July 1944 – July 1945), Brigadier General Thomas W. Herren (July 1945 – October 1945).
- Returned to U.S.: 10 October 1945.
- Inactivated: 11 October 1945 at Camp Kilmer, New Jersey

==== Formation and training ====
The 70th Infantry Division was activated in the Army of the United States on 15 June 1943. The division's nickname, "Trailblazers," originated from the pioneers moving west into Oregon and "blazing" trails through the thick evergreen forests of the Pacific Northwest. The enlisted fillers represented all forty-eight states, the District of Columbia, the territories, and forty foreign countries, including every Axis power. The states of the original Oregon Country (California, Idaho, Montana, Oregon, and Wyoming), contributed around 1,200 men combined, however, the largest number of men from any one state (1,165) came from Missouri, while Minnesota, Illinois, Pennsylvania, and Texas contributed over 1,000 men each.

==== Division organization ====
The 70th Infantry Division consisted of the following units.

70th Infantry Division organization (click to enlarge)

- 70th Infantry Division
  - 70th Infantry Division Headquarters
  - 70th Cavalry Reconnaissance Troop (Mechanized) (M3 scout cars and then M8 Greyhound armored cars)
  - 274th Infantry Regiment
    - Headquarters and Headquarters Company
    - 3× Infantry battalions
      - each battalion consists of: 1× Headquarters and Headquarters Company, 3× Rifle companies, 1× Heavy Weapons Company
    - Cannon Company (T12 Gun Motor Carriages and T19 Howitzer Motor Carriages, later replaced by either M3 105mm towed howitzers or M7 Priest self propelled howitzers)
    - Anti-Tank Company (M3 37mm anti-tank guns, which were replaced by 1944 with M1 57mm anti-tank guns)
    - Service Company
  - 275th Infantry Regiment
    - same organization as 274th Infantry Regiment
  - 276th Infantry Regiment
    - same organization as 274th Infantry Regiment
  - 70th Infantry Division Artillery
    - Headquarters and Headquarters Battery
    - 725th Field Artillery Battalion
      - Headquarters and Headquarters Battery
      - 3× Batteries (M1 155mm towed howitzers)
      - Service Battery
    - 882nd Field Artillery Battalion
      - Headquarters and Headquarters Battery
      - 3× Batteries (M2 105mm towed howitzers)
      - Service Battery
    - 883rd Field Artillery Battalion
      - same organization as 882nd Field Artillery Battalion
    - 884th Field Artillery Battalion
      - same organization as 882nd Field Artillery Battalion
  - Headquarters Special Troops
    - Headquarters Company, 70th Infantry Division
    - 570th Signal Company
    - 70th Quartermaster Company
    - 770th Ordnance Light Maintenance Company
    - Military Police Platoon
    - 70th Infantry Division Band (attached)
  - 270th Engineer Combat Battalion
    - Headquarters and Headquarters and Service Company
    - 3× Engineer combat companies
  - 370th Medical Battalion
    - Headquarters and Headquarters Detachment
    - 3× Collecting companies
    - Clearing Company

==== Combat chronicle ====
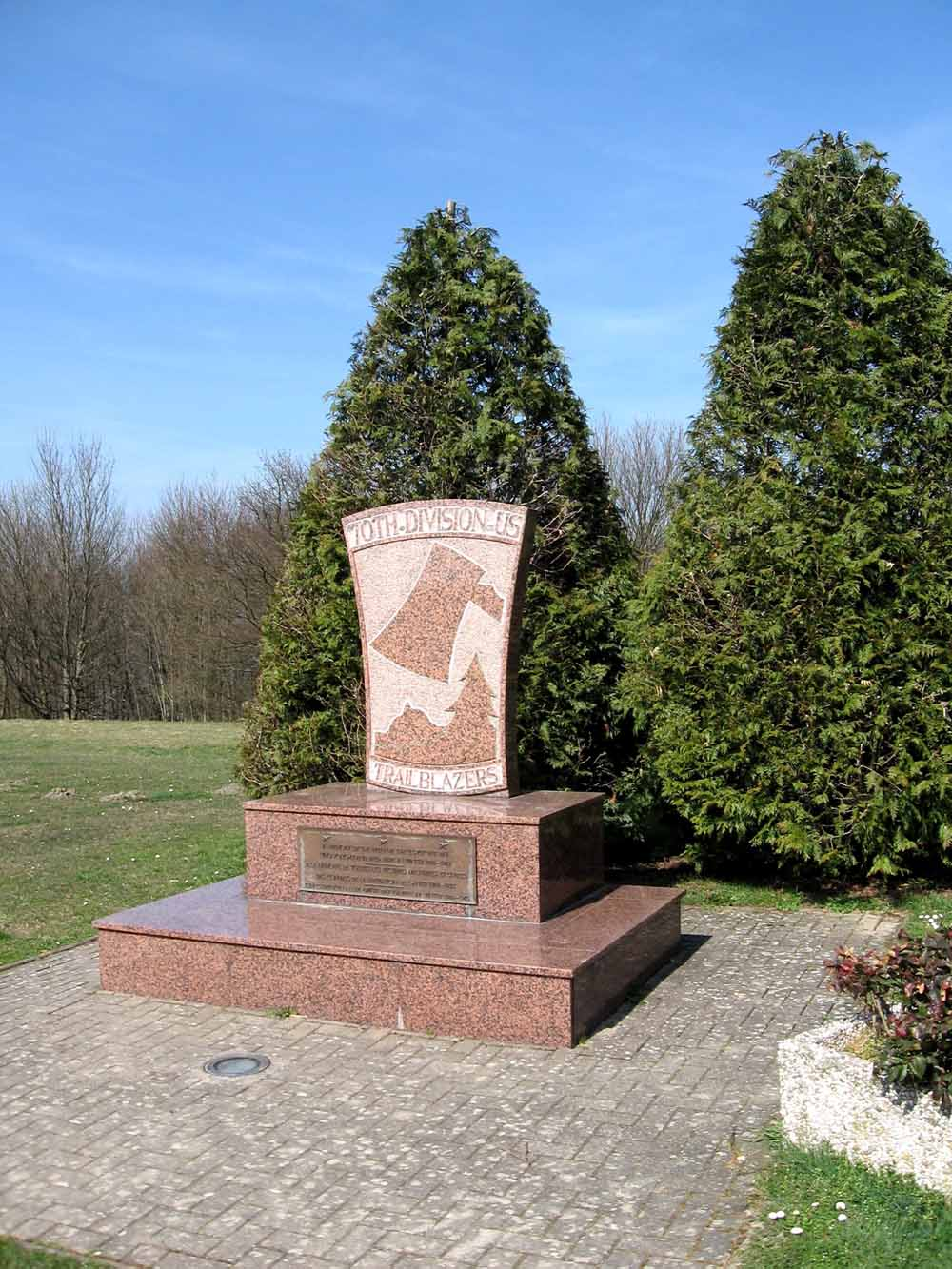
Memorial for fallen soldiers of the 70th at Spicheren Heights, near Stiring-Wendel

The three infantry regiments of the 70th Infantry Division, the 274th, 275th and 276th, landed at Marseille, France, 10–15 December 1944, and were formed into Task Force Herren under command of deputy division commander, Thomas W. Herren, before the arrival of the remainder of the division on 18 January 1945. Task Force Herren took over defensive positions along the west bank of the Rhine, 28 December 1944, in the vicinity of Bischwiller, south of Haguenau Forest. Elements took part in the fight to stop the German Operation Nordwind, and struck at the enemy at Philippsbourg and at Wingen between Bitche and Hagenau. In mid-January 1945, the task force moved to an area directly south of Saarbrücken, where it carried out reconnaissance and combat patrols, and improved its defensive positions. Upon the arrival of the remainder of the division, Task Force Herren was dissolved.

The division continued patrolling and combat raids as it made preparations for an offensive drive in mid-February. On 17 February 1945, the division attacked just below the Saar River. The 70th drove onto high ground overlooking Saarbrücken, smashed into Forbach, took Stiring-Wendel, and continued across the Saar to take Saarbrücken, 20 March 1945. Pushing through Siegfried Line defenses along the north bank of the Saar, the division took Völklingen and other Saarland cities and towns. On 31 March it was reassigned to the Third Army. In April it took part in the reduction of the Saar Basin, and after VE-day was engaged in occupational duties, with command posts at Otterberg, Bad Kreuznach, Frankfurt, and Oranienstein in Germany.

==== Casualties ====
- Total battle casualties: 3,919
- Killed in action: 755
- Wounded in action: 2,713
- Missing in action: 54
- Prisoner of war: 397

==== Assignments in ETO ====
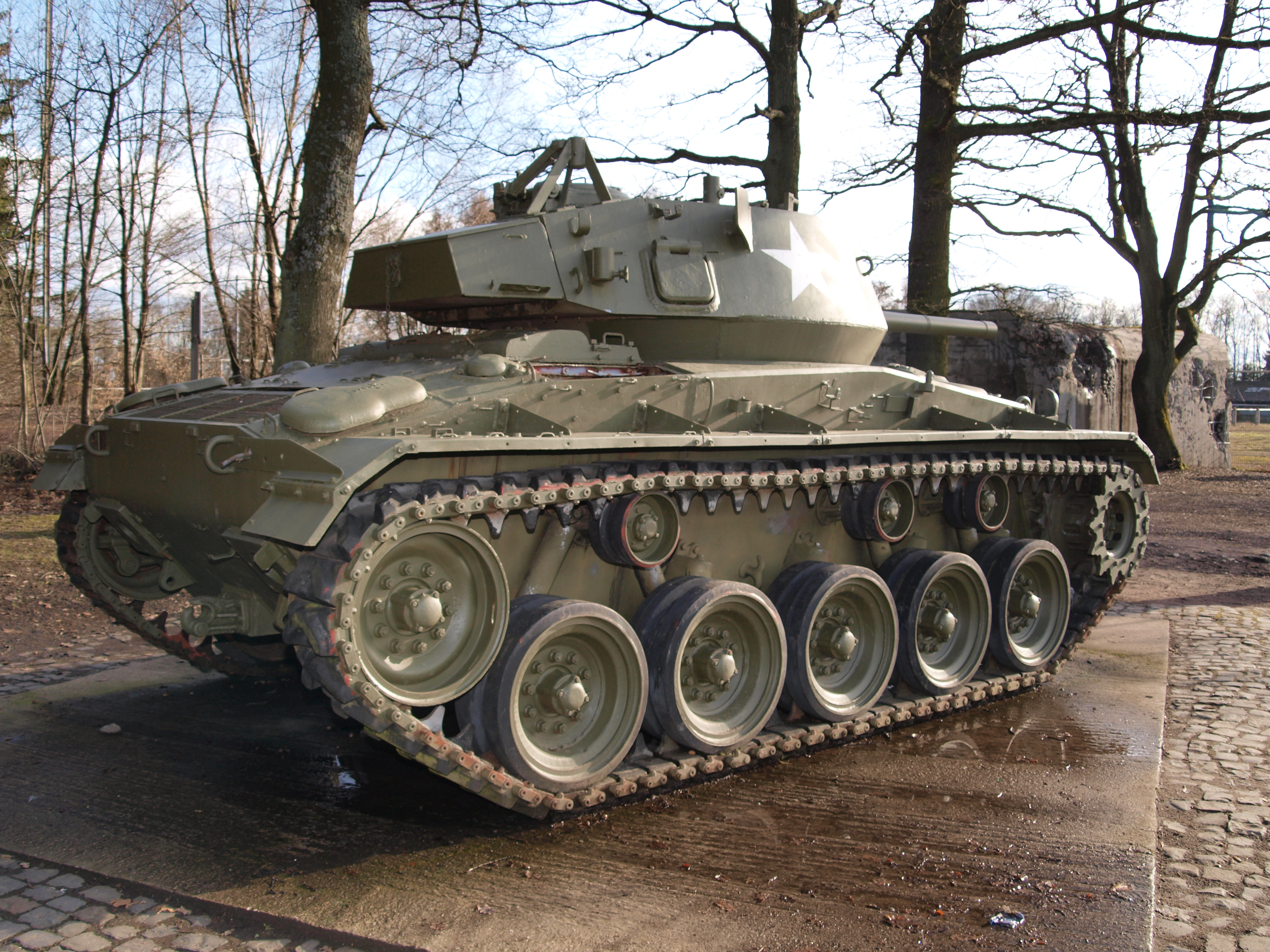
M24, donated by veterans of the 70th, facing ruins of fortifications at Spicheren Heights

- 20 December 1944: Seventh Army, 6th Army Group.
- 28 December 1944: VI Corps.
- 3 February 1945: XV Corps.
- 25 February 1945: XXI Corps.
- 22 March 1945: Seventh Army, 6th Army Group.
- 31 March 1945: 12th Army Group.
- 8 April 1945: Third Army, 12th Army Group.

=== Cold War ===
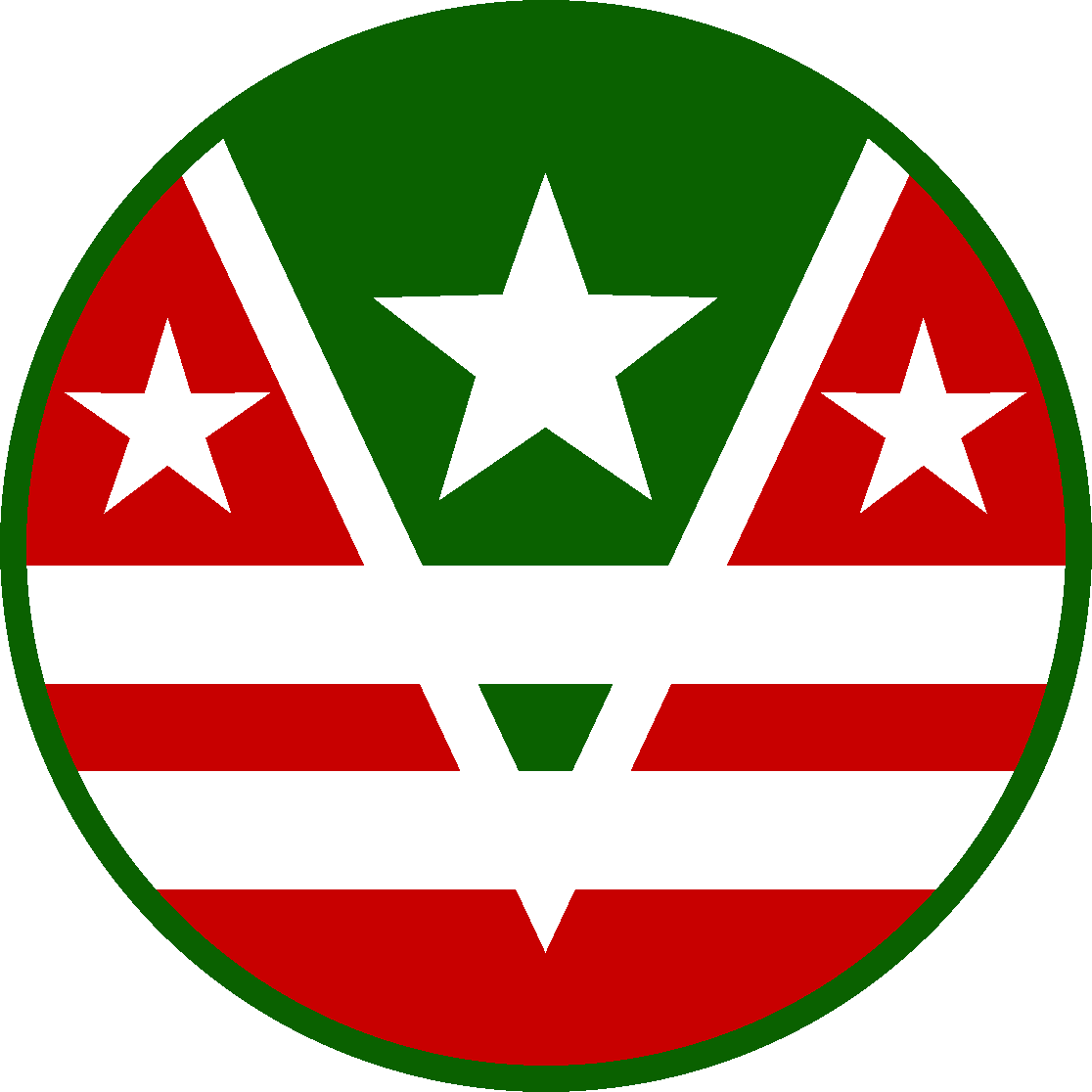
124th Army Reserve Command / ARCOM SSI

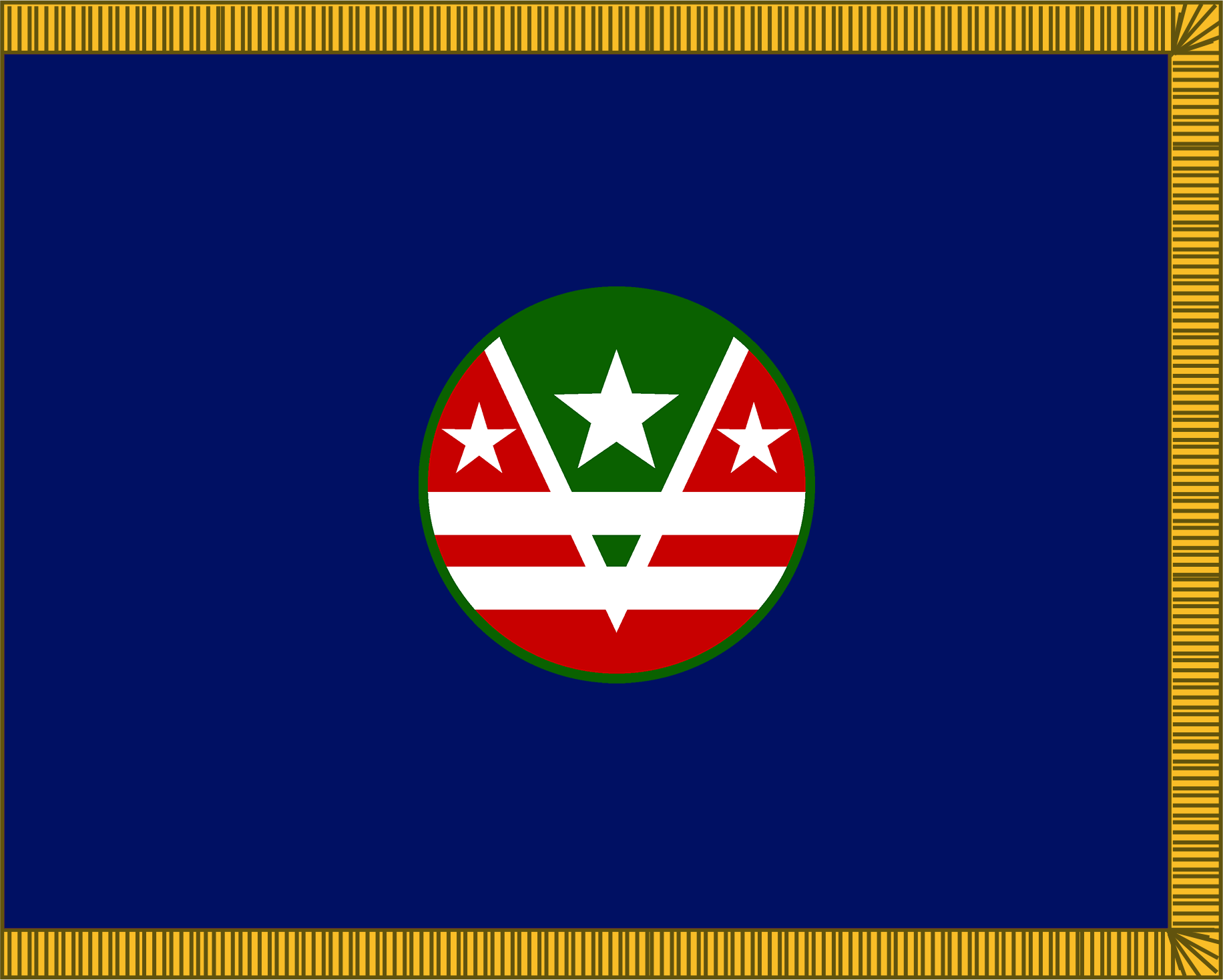
124th Army Reserve Command Flag

In 1952 it was allotted to the Organized Reserve Corps, now known as the Army Reserve. Later the same year the 70th was redesignated as the 70th Division (Training). It remained in Detroit until 1968, when it was moved to Livonia, Mich. The 70th Division (Training) was formally inactivated in Michigan on 15 Nov. 1996. The very next day, the 70th Regional Support Command was activated at Fort Lawton, Wash., bringing the name of the 70th back to the Northwest

In 1979 the command was redesignated as the 70th Regiment (Infantry One Station Unit Training), 70th Division (Training). During Desert Storm in 1991 the 70th took over Infantry School operations at Fort Benning, Georgia. The command was formally inactivated in Michigan on 15 Nov. 1996 and the 124th Army Reserve Command (ARCOM) adopted the division title and history the next day. In 2000 the 70th Regional Support Command became the 70th Regional Readiness Command and began developing a history and relationship with the 70th ID soldiers and association.

Based upon the 2005 BRAC recommendations, Fort Lawton was closed and the 70th Regional Support Command inactivated 7 September 2008.

== Division insignia ==
- Nickname: Trailblazers.
- Shoulder patch: Red, in shape of axe-blade with white axe-head superimposed on red background; below the axe, in white is a replica of Oregon's Mount Hood, beside which is a green fir tree. The green fir tree symbolizes the 91st Infantry Division from which officers and NCOs of the 70th were drawn prior to its activation.

== See also ==
- 289th Engineer Combat Battalion (United States)
- 549th Engineer Light Ponton Company
- Bernard W. Rogers
