= Allison J. Barnett =

U.S. army general (1892–1971)

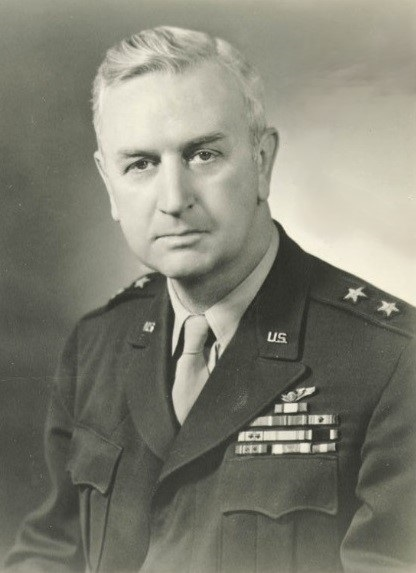
- Barnett as a major general, c. 1945
- Born: April 2, 1892; Owensboro, Kentucky, U.S.
- Died: October 7, 1971 (aged 79); San Antonio, Texas, U.S.
- Burial place: Fort Sam Houston National Cemetery
- Education: University of Kentucky (attended); United States Army Command and General Staff College
- Spouse: Mary Elizabeth Collins (m. 1927–1971)
- Relatives: Edgar T. Collins (father-in-law)
- Military career
- Service: Kentucky National Guard; United States Army
- Service years: 1906–1913 (National Guard); 1917–1920 (National Guard); 1920–1947 (Army)
- Rank: Captain (National Guard); Major General (Army)
- Service number: 05364
- Unit: U.S. Infantry Branch
- Commands: Company H, 3rd Kentucky Infantry Regiment; Company H, 158th Infantry Regiment; Company 1, 139th Machine Gun Battalion; Company D, 39th Infantry Regiment; Howitzer Company, 29th Infantry Regiment; 3rd Battalion, 34th Infantry Regiment; 378th Infantry Regiment; 70th Infantry Division; 94th Infantry Division
- Conflicts: World War I Occupation of the Rhineland; World War II; Allied-occupied Germany
- Awards: Army Distinguished Service Medal; Legion of Merit; Bronze Star Medal; Order of the White Lion (Czechoslovakia); Order of the Red Banner (USSR)

Allison J. Barnett (April 2, 1892 – October 7, 1971) was a career officer in the United States Army. A veteran of World War I and World War II, he served from 1917 to 1927 and attained the rank of major general. Barnett's Second World War commands included the 70th Infantry Division and 94th Infantry Division, and his awards and decorations included the Army Distinguished Service Medal, Legion of Merit, and Bronze Star Medal from the United States and the Order of the White Lion from Czechoslovakia.

A native of Owensboro, Kentucky, Barnett was raised and educated in Hartford and attended the University of Kentucky. He served in the National Guard from 1906 to 1913, and also worked as associate editor of the Hartford Republican newspaper. he rejoined the National Guard at the start of World War I, was commissioned as a captain, and commanded his old company during its initial wartime training and reorganization. He went on to command other companies during combat in France, and after the war obtained a commission in the regular army.

Following the First World War, Barnett served in the United States and was posted to the Philippines as he carried out command and staff assignments. He graduated from the United States Army Command and General Staff College in 1933, and was trained as an aerial observer. As the U.S. prepared to enter World War II, Barnett commanded a battalion and a regiment, then served as assistant division commander of the 93rd Infantry Division with the temporary rank of brigadier general. He subsequently served as chief of staff for U.S. Army Forces, South Pacific Area and was credited with planning and overseeing execution of battles in the Guadalcanal campaign and Solomon Islands campaign. As a temporary major general, he commanded the 70th Infantry Division during combat in Europe in early to mid-1945, after which he returned to the United States to command the 94th Infantry Division, which was reorganizing after fighting in Europe and being readied for deployment to Japan. The Japanese surrender ended the need for U.S. troops including the 94th Division to fight in the Pacific area, and Barnett led the division until it was inactivated in early 1946.

After World War II, Barnett was reduced in rank to temporary brigadier general and served as assistant chief of staff for First U.S. Army at Governors Island, New York. He retired as a major general in 1947 and became a resident of San Antonio, Texas. Barnett died in San Antonio on October 7, 1971. He was buried at Fort Sam Houston National Cemetery.

== Early life ==
Allison Joseph Barnett was born in Owensboro, Kentucky on April 9, 1892, a son of Cicero Maxwell Barnett and Alice Dee (Bennett) Barnett. His father was the publisher of the Hartford Republican newspaper, and Barnett was raised and educated in Hartford, Kentucky. After attending the local schools, he was a student at the Vanderbilt Training School in Elkton, Kentucky and Hartford's Hartford College and Business Institute. He then went on to attend the University of Kentucky in Lexington, Kentucky, after which he returned to Hartford to become associate editor of the Hartford Republican.

In June 1906, Barnett enlisted in the Kentucky National Guard as a private in the newly organized Company H of the 3rd Kentucky Infantry Regiment. Assigned to the company's 4th squad, he was subsequently appointed one of the company's two musicians. He continued to serve until 1913, when he was discharged with the rank of sergeant.

With American entry into World War I in April 1917, the 3rd Kentucky Infantry was mobilized in anticipation of being called up for federal service, and Barnett rejoined Company H as a private. The company commander subsequently resigned, and on May 1, Barnett was commissioned as a captain and appointed to replace him.

== Start of career ==
After assuming command of Company H, Barnett led the unit to Camp Shelby, Mississippi. As units were organized and trained, Barnett transferred to command of Company H, 158th Infantry Regiment. He was subsequently assigned to command Company 1, 139th Machine Gun Battalion, a subordinate command of the 38th Division. After this assignment, he was appointed to command Company D, 39th Infantry Regiment, a unit of the 4th Division. He arrived in France in September 1918, and the 4th Division took part in the Battle of Saint-Mihiel and Meuse–Argonne offensive from September until the Armistice of November 11, 1918 ended the war. Barnett remained in Europe during the Occupation of the Rhineland, and was the regimental plans, operations, and training officer (S-3) of the 39th Infantry when the unit returned to the United States in September 1919 and reorganized at Camp Dodge, Iowa.

On July 1, 1920, Barnett was commissioned as a first lieutenant in the regular army, and he was promoted to captain on the same day. He continued to serve with the 39th Infantry at Camp Lewis, Washington. In June 1921, he graduated from the basic course for officers at the Fort Benning, Georgia Infantry School, after which he rejoined the 39th Infantry as S-3. When the 4th Division was inactivated, Barnett was assigned to the 4th Infantry Regiment at Fort George Wright, then to the 5th Infantry Brigade at Vancouver Barracks, Washington, where he served as the S-3. In June 1923, he graduated from the basic course for officers at Fort Sill, Oklahoma Field Artillery School. After graduating, Barnett joined the 29th Infantry Regiment at Fort Benning and was assigned as commander of the regiment's Howitzer Company. In July 1925, he was assigned to the Department of Experiment on the staff of the Infantry School, and he remained there until October 1928.

== Continued career ==
From October 1928 to November 1930, Barnett served with the 57th Infantry at Fort William McKinley, Philippines, and with the 34th Infantry at Fort Eustis, Virginia until June 1931. He was then enrolled as a student at the Fort Leavenworth, Kansas United States Army Command and General Staff College, from which he graduated in June 1933. Barnett was promoted to major after his Staff College graduation, then assigned as a student at Air Corps Tactical School (Maxwell Field, Alabama), where he qualified as an aerial observer. He then performed staff duty with the Organized Reserve Corps in Denver, Colorado. From August 1938 to August 1940, he was an instructor at the Air Corps Tactical School.

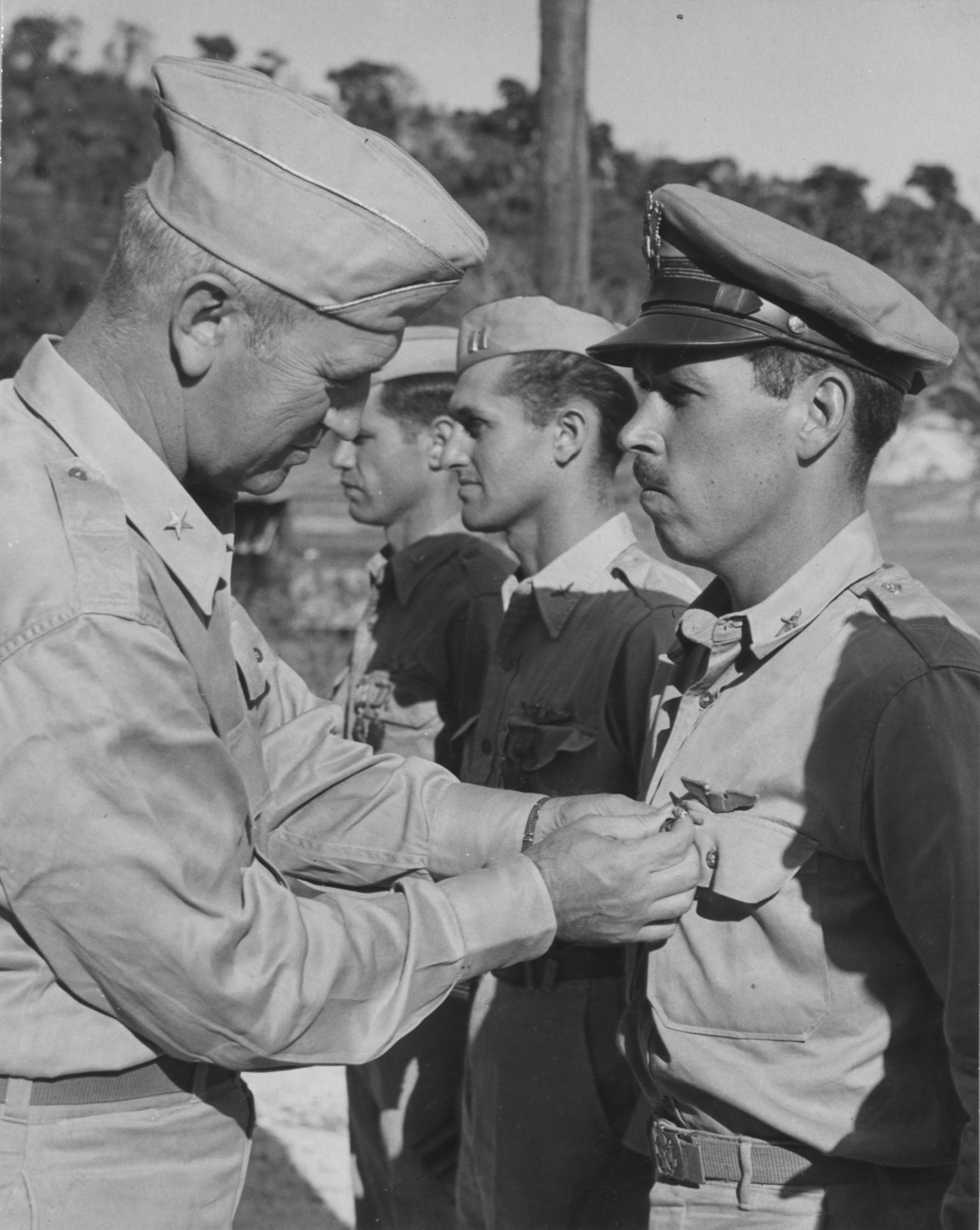
Barnett presents Air Medal to Capt. Gilbert G. Smith Jr., 1943

In anticipation of U.S. entry into World War II, in July 1940, Barnett was promoted to lieutenant colonel, and in August 1940, he was assigned to command 3rd Battalion, 34th Infantry Regiment at Fort Jackson, South Carolina. From December 1940 to August 1941, he served at the Camp Croft, South Carolina Replacement Training Center, first as executive officer and later as Plans, Operations, and Training Officer (S-3). From August 1941 to May 1942, Barnett served on the Air Support Command staff at Bolling Field, District of Columbia and its successor unit, the Air Support Section at Army Air Forces Headquarters in Washington, D.C. He was promoted to temporary colonel in December 1941.

In May 1942, Barnett was assigned to Camp Swift, Texas as commander of the 378th Infantry Regiment. In July 1942, he was promoted to temporary brigadier general and assigned as assistant division commander of the 93rd Infantry Division at Fort Huachuca, Arizona. In December 1942, Barnett was appointed chief of staff of U.S. Army Forces, South Pacific Area. He was promoted to temporary major general in January 1944. As chief of staff, Barnett oversaw planning of U.S. military activities for several campaigns and battles, including the Guadalcanal campaign and Solomon Islands campaign.

== Later career ==
Barnett returned to the United States in August 1944 and assumed command of the 70th Infantry Division. The division arrived in Marseille, France during December 1944 and January 1945, after which it moved north and carried out defensive operations along the west bank of the Rhine in the vicinity of Bischweiler. In mid-January 1945, the division's Infantry regiments moved to an area near Saarbrücken, where it conducted reconnaissance patrols and improved defensive positions. When the division was consolidated in February 1945, it began offensive operations and it captured Saarbrücken on March 20. After penetrating Germany's Siegfried Line defenses along the north bank of the Saar, the 70th Division captured Völklingen, Saarland, and several other cities and towns. In April, Barnett's division took part in reducing German defenses in the Saar Basin. After the European war ended in May 1945, the 70th Infantry Division took part in occupation duties, with posts in Otterberg, Bad Kreuznach, Frankfurt, and Diez.

In August 1945, Barnett returned to the United States and assumed command of the 94th Infantry Division, which had returned from combat in Europe and was reorganizing and training for combat against Japan. The surrender of Japan later that month ended the need for additional combat troops for the Pacific War, and Barnett remained in command until the 94th Division was inactivated at Camp Kilmer, New Jersey in February 1946. In April 1946, Barnett's temporary major general's rank was terminated, and he continued to serve as a temporary brigadier general. After the 94th Division's inactivation, he served as assistant chief of staff for First U.S. Army at Governors Island, New York. Barnett retired as a major general on October 31, 1947.

== Retirement and death ==
In retirement, Barnett was a resident of San Antonio, Texas. He died in San Antonio on October 7, 1971. He was buried at Fort Sam Houston National Cemetery, Section 2B, Site 2910.

== Awards ==
Barnett's awards included the Army Distinguished Service Medal, Legion of Merit, and Bronze Star Medal. His foreign decorations included the Order of the White Lion from Czechoslovakia and the Order of the Red Banner from the Union of Soviet Socialist Republics.

=== Distinguished Service Medal citation ===
Major General Allison J. Barnett (ASN: 0-5364), United States Army, is awarded the Army Distinguished Service Medal for exceptionally meritorious and distinguished services to the Government of the United States, in a duty of great responsibility as chief of staff, United States Army Forces, South Pacific Area from January 13 to September 21, 1943. He not only coordinated the work incident to the successful campaigns in Guadalcanal, New Georgia and Vella Lavella, but he also personally observed the operation of these movements and was credited with many of the successful tactical decisions.

Service: Army Rank: Major General General Orders: War Department, General Orders No. 45 (1944)

=== Legion of Merit citation ===
The President of the United States of America takes pleasure in presenting the Legion of Merit (Navy Award) to Major General Allison J. Barnett (ASN: 0-5364), United States Army, for exceptionally meritorious conduct in the performance of outstanding services to the Government of the United States while serving as Chief of Staff to the Commanding General, United States Army Air Forces in the South Pacific Area from 22 September 1943 to 5 June 1944. During this period, Major General Barnett worked closely and effectively with the Commander South Pacific Area and South Pacific Force and with the South Pacific Joint Staff in the conception and successful execution of the many offensive operations carried out in the Solomon Islands and Bismarck Archipelago areas. His efficient coordination of the activities of the Army with those of the Navy and Marine Corps contributed greatly to the ability of our forces to exert their greatest strength against the enemy and administer a series of crushing defeats. His initiative, forceful leadership, and broad understanding of combined operations were in keeping with the highest traditions of the United States Military Service.

Service: Army Rank: Major General General Orders: Commander South Pacific, Serial 2772 (June 12, 1944)

== Family ==
In October 1927, Barnett married Mary Elizabeth "Betty" Collins. She was the daughter of Major General Edgar T. Collins. They were married until his death, and had no children.

== Effective dates of promotion ==
- Private (National Guard), 1906
- Sergeant (National Guard), 1909 (Resigned 1913)
- Private (National Guard), April 19, 1917
- Captain (National Guard), May 1, 1917
- First Lieutenant (Army), July 1, 1920
- Captain (Army), July 1, 1920
- Major (Army), June 1, 1933
- Lieutenant Colonel (Army), July 1, 1940
- Colonel (Army of the United States), December 11, 1941
- Brigadier General (AUS), July 28, 1942
- Major General (AUS), January 15, 1944
- Brigadier General (AUS), April 30, 1946
- Major General (Retired), October 31, 1947
