= Thomas W. Herren =

United States Army general

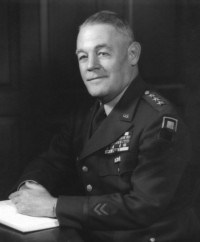
- Born: August 9, 1895; Dadeville, Alabama
- Died: June 4, 1985 (aged 89); Washington, D.C.
- Burial place: Arlington National Cemetery
- Military career
- Allegiance: United States
- Branch: United States Army
- Service years: 1917–1957
- Rank: Lieutenant general
- Commands: First United States Army; Military District of Washington; Northern Area Command – United States Army of Occupation, Germany; Korean Communications Zone; 70th Division; United States Army Cavalry School; 106th Cavalry Regiment
- Conflicts: World War I World War II; Korean War
- Awards: Army Distinguished Service Medal; Legion of Merit

Thomas Wade Herren (August 9, 1895 – June 4, 1985) was a United States Army officer and combat commander whose career spanned from World War I to the post-Korean War era.

== Early years and World War I ==
Herren was born in Dadeville, Alabama, on August 9, 1895. He was graduated from Tallapoosa Country High School in 1914 and from the University of Alabama in 1917. After a few months as a high school teacher in Gadsden, Alabama, he enrolled as an officer candidate in the first officers training camp at Fort McPherson, Georgia in May 1917. He was commissioned a provisional second lieutenant in the Regular Army on August 15, 1917, and assigned to the 78th Field Artillery at Fort Bliss, Texas. After a brief course at the Field Artillery School, he accompanied his regiment to France as a battery executive officer and then commander until it was demobilized.

== Inter-war years ==
After World War I, Herren was troop commander (Troop A) in the 3rd Cavalry Regiment, and then a recruiting officer in Springfield, Massachusetts. His area included all of New England within the First Corps Area, headquartered in Boston.

Herren attended the Troop Officer Course at the United States Army Cavalry School in 1926–27. After graduation he returned to Fort Bliss, assigned to the 8th Cavalry Regiment, serving as a troop commander and regimental adjutant. Additionally, he was captain of the horse show team and a noted member of the post's pre-war polo team. He participated in maneuvers in the Big Bend area of Texas, trained remounts and cavalry recruits and assisted in the care and feeding of thousands of Mexicans whose homes has been inundated in the 1927 flood of the Rio Grande. It was while serving here that he met and married his wife, Lillian Hague Corcoran, the daughter of a cavalry officer.

From 1930 to 1935 Herren was assigned to the 6th Cavalry Regiment at Fort Oglethorpe, Georgia, again as a troop commander (Troop F) and regimental adjutant. He continued his participation in this regiment's horse show team (as its captain) and polo team. He participated with his troop in annual maneuvers with the United States Army Infantry School students at Fort Benning, Georgia.

== Civilian Conservation Corps ==
In 1933, during the Great Depression, the United States Army provided logistical support to the federal Emergency Conservation Work program, later known as the Civilian Conservation Corps (CCC). Herren, as part of that effort, moved to Gatlinburg, Tennessee, where he organized and supervised the construction, supply and operation of 17 CCC camps in the Great Smoky Mountains National Park. At the Smokies, local citizens or "local experienced men" (LEM) were employed to cut the dead chestnut timber and snake it clown the mountains, saw it into lumber and construct the camps for young male enrollees from urban areas. After the camps were built and occupied, he returned to Fort Oglethorpe to become CCC district supervisor for Tennessee and North Carolina. During this period he attended short courses in Chemical Warfare, Sanitation, Food Service, Public Relations and other subjects of value to military officers. His sons, Lt. Col. Thomas W Herren Jr. (August 17, 1933 – August 12, 2017), and Col. John D. Herren (September 10, 1934 - February 7, 2026), were born during his tour at Fort Oglethorpe and would both later go on to graduate from the United States Military Academy. Col. John D. Herren later served as a captain on the infamous Battle of Ia Drang depicted in the book We Were Soldiers Once and Young.

== Advanced Officer Training ==
In 1935, Herren was promoted to major and attended the Command and General Staff School at Fort Leavenworth, Kansas. Upon the completion of that course in 1936, he returned to the United States Army Cavalry School, at Fort Riley, Kansas as an instructor in the Department of Tactics from 1937 to 1938. At that time "Mechanization" was introduced into the school curriculum and the tactics and techniques developed by Herren's department were later used by General George Patton and his armored units in World War II.

During the summer of 1938 Herren was assigned to the United States Army Infantry School at Fort Benning, Georgia where he was a cavalry instructor and chairman of the animal management and transportation committee. At the school, he was responsible for all activities involving the use of horses and reconnaissance vehicles, developing and demonstrating tactics of scout cars and light reconnaissance vehicles of all types. He worked with infantry instructors to develop the use of light tanks, armored cars and other mechanized equipment. The use of anti-tank battalions was first introduced at this time. The Infantry School had a stable of horses used for tactical rides and mobility in heavy terrain and its horse show team and polo teams provided recreation for students and members of the regular garrison.

== World War II ==
In 1942 Herren was promoted to colonel and assigned to the 106th Cavalry Regiment of the Illinois National Guard then in training at Camp Livingston, Louisiana. This regiment was one of the first to receive mechanized equipment and was being prepared for overseas duty in a crash program. Every individual had to be retrained, new subjects taught and tactics and techniques developed and perfected. As commander, he prepared this regiment for combat by intensive training which included two of the famous Louisiana Maneuvers. As the regiment was deployed to Europe in 1943, Herren returned to the Cavalry School at Fort Riley as its commandant and was promoted to brigadier general in 1944.

Herren joined the 70th Infantry Division at Fort Leonard Wood, Missouri as assistant division commander in the fall of 1944, near the end of its pre-deployment training. With three infantry regiments— 274th 275th and 276th – the incomplete division, minus special troops, deployed to Marseilles, France in December 1944. As Task Force HERREN it undertook combat missions with the Seventh United States Army in northeast France, mostly in the Alsace-Lorraine region. Task Force HERREN fought in numerous engagements in Operation Nordwind and along the Rhine until remaining units of 70th Division arrived. Herren remained with the 70th Division until it returned to the States and demobilized.

== Cold War and Korea ==
Upon his return to the United States, Herren was assigned to Fort Sam Houston, Texas as Chief of Staff G-3 for planning of the Fourth United States Army in San Antonio, Texas. There he planned and supervised post war training programs in the Fourth Army area. In the summer of 1946 he was ordered to Korea as XXIV Corps chief of staff under the command of General John R. Hodge. In subsequent assignments as Eighth United States Army deputy commanding general for civil affairs and commanding general of Korean Communications Zone, Herren planned and initiated the economic rehabilitation and the restoration of civil government in Korea. He arranged accommodations for dependents of Army personnel, set up schools for children of introduced English language courses in Korean schools. He also supervised the organization of the military/civilian government — saw to it that Korean officials were trained to function in governmental positions. He supervised the elections in 1949 which resulted in the government of the Republic of Korea. He arranged and supervised the conferences between the Soviet Union and the United States to discuss the unification of Korea, and provided guidance to United Nations Committee on Korea.

In late 1949 Herren became 2nd Brigade commander for the 1st Cavalry Division in Tokyo for six months before returning to the United States where he was promoted to major general and appointed to staff for the Secretary of Defense as Chief of Special Services in 1950. In this position he directed and supervised all United States Armed Forces Institute education programs throughout the Army, arranged for off duty classes and overseas instruction. He supervised the Army athletic and recreation programs in the U.S. and overseas, including the Army's participation in the Olympic Games of 1952. When the office of Chief of Special Services was absorbed by the Adjutant General's office, he assumed command of the Military District of Washington. The Army, as the senior service, is the lead participant in public ceremonies and other events that occur continuously in the Washington, D.C., area.

During the Korean War, Herren was deputy commanding general for Eighth United States Army. Then as an effort to focus Eighth Army efforts on combat, Herren was appointed commanding general of the Korean Communications Zone and Economic Adviser, Republic of Korea, a vital rear echelon command responsible for U.S. Army activities in the southern two thirds of South Korea. He oversaw the handling of prisoners of war, refugees and logistical support and supply of combat units of Eighth Army. He received the repatriated U.S. prisoners of war and facilitated their return to the United States. Conversely, his responsibilities included the detention and later, the return of Communist prisoners of war to North Korea.

In 1953 Herren became commanding general of a newly established Northern Area Command of United States Army Europe headquartered in Frankfurt, Germany. Again Herren commanded logistical support and supply for U.S. Army forces and military dependents in over two dozen posts, sub-posts and training areas in northern Germany. NORCOM consisted of the former Frankfurt and Wuerzburg districts and military posts, Bamberg subpost for Nuernberg, and the airbases at Rhine-Main and Wiesbaden. His close liaison with West German authorities allowed for the construction and leasing of housing- acquisition of buildings for schools, organization of a school system for American children, provision of teachers, and supervision of the educational programs. Over 6000 dependent housing units and facilities costing over one billion dollars were built in his tenure there.

== Final command and retirement ==
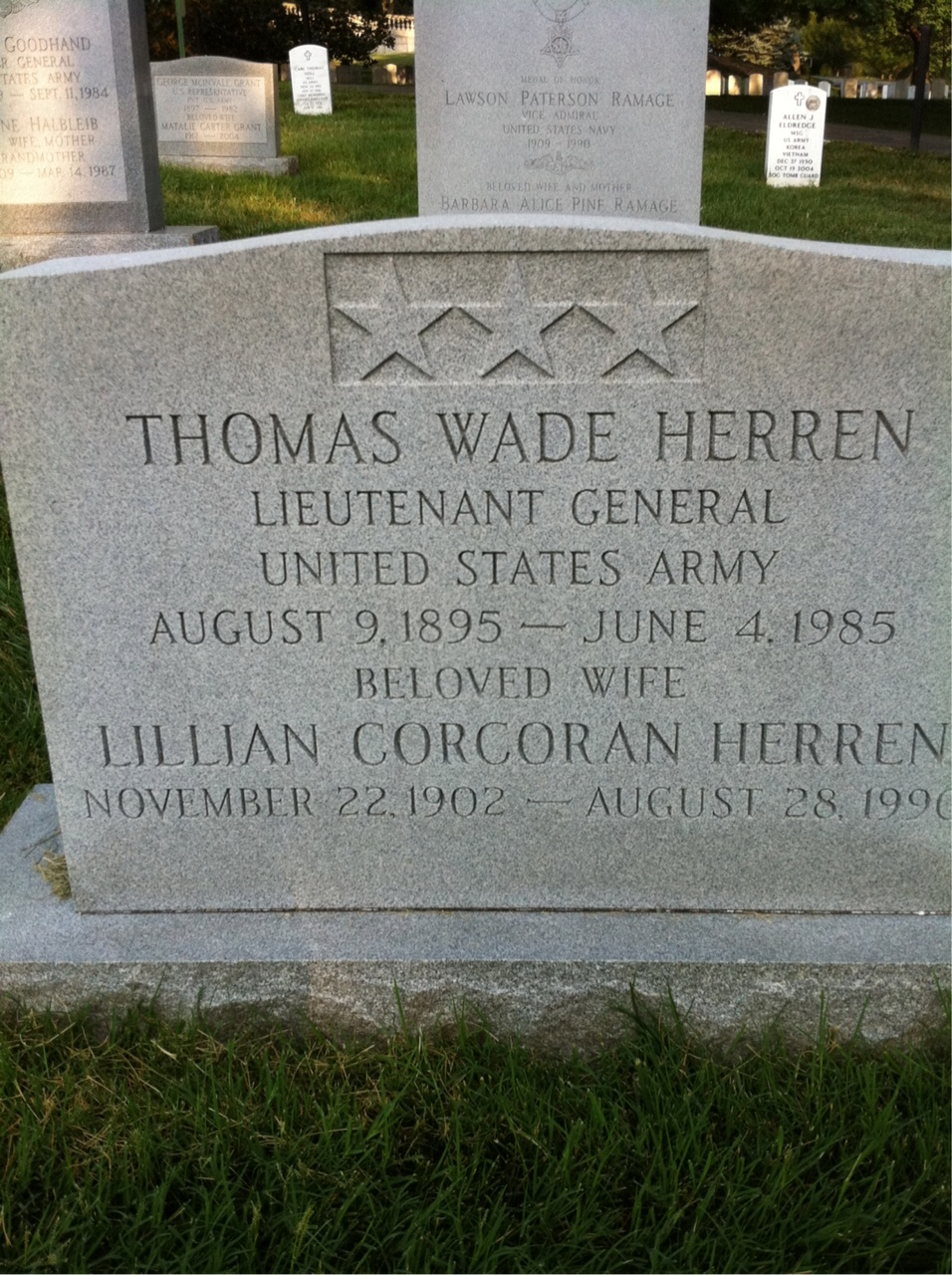
Grave at Arlington National Cemetery

Herren was promoted to lieutenant general in 1954 and assumed his final command as commanding general of First United States Army at Fort Jay, Governors Island, New York. His responsibilities included all operations in the First Army area, including training, morale and supply. He supervised the operation of the Army ROTC programs in 50 schools, colleges, and 4 military institutes. He represented the United States on the Military Committee of the United Nations. Herren retired from the Army at Governors Island on July 31, 1957, after 40 years of active duty.

After the end of his military career, Herren moved to Washington, D.C., working in the private sector until 1967. Herren maintained close ties with his family and friends in and around Birmingham, Alabama and enjoyed vacations at his lake cabin on Lake Martin near his hometown of Dadeville, Alabama.

Herren died on June 4, 1985, at his home in Washington, D.C., at the age of 89. His wife, Lillian Herren, died on August 28, 1990, at the age of 87. Both are interred at Arlington National Cemetery.

Military offices
Preceded by Withers A. Burress	Commanding General – First United States Army; December 1, 1954 – July 31, 1957	Succeeded by Blackshear M. Bryan
