= Hohenahr =

- Municipality
- Flag Coat of arms

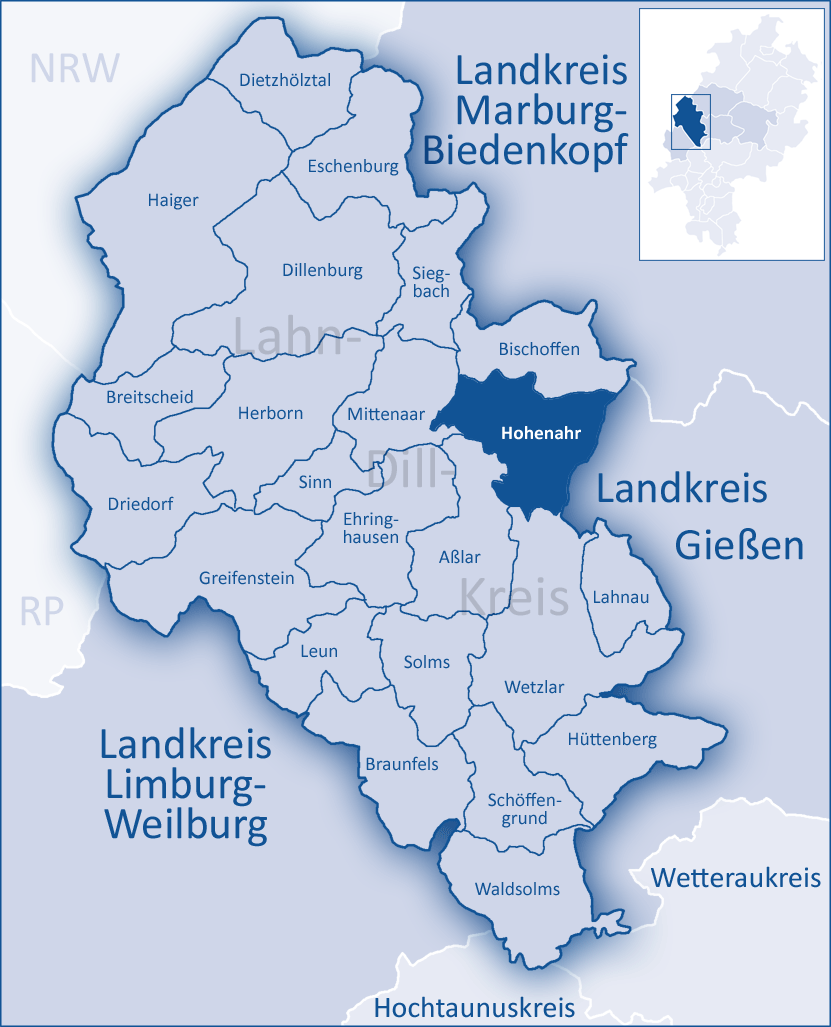
- Location of Hohenahr within Lahn-Dill-Kreis district
- Interactive map of Hohenahr
- Location within Germany Location within Hesse
- Coordinates: 50°40′N 08°31′E
- Country: Germany
- State: Hesse
- Admin. region: Gießen
- District: Lahn-Dill-Kreis

Government
  - Mayor (2022–28): Markus Ebertz (Ind.)

Area
  - Total: 45.67 km^{2} (17.63 sq mi)
- Elevation: 305 m (1,001 ft)

Population (2025-12-31)
  - Total: 4,944
  - Density: 108.3/km^{2} (280.4/sq mi)
- Time zone: UTC+01:00 (CET)
  - Summer (DST): UTC+02:00 (CEST)
- Postal codes: 35644
- Dialling codes: 06446
- Vehicle registration: LDK, DIL, WZ
- Website: www.hohenahr.de

Hohenahr (German pronunciation: [ˈhoːənˌʔaːɐ̯]) is a municipality in the Lahn-Dill-Kreis in Hesse, Germany.

== Geography ==
=== Location ===
Hohenahr lies in the Lahn-Dill Highland at a height of between 260 and 440 m above sea level. Its constituent communities of Ahrdt and Mudersbach are on the shores of the Aartalsee (lake).

=== Neighbouring communities ===
Hohenahr borders in the north on the community of Bischoffen (Lahn-Dill-Kreis), in the east on the community of Biebertal (Gießen district), in the south on the town of Wetzlar, in the southwest on the town of Aßlar, and in the west on the community of Mittenaar (all in the Lahn-Dill-Kreis).

=== Constituent communities ===
The centres of Ahrdt, Altenkirchen, Erda (administrative seat), Großaltenstädten, Hohensolms and Mudersbach are all part of the community.

== History ==
The constituent community of Erda had its first documentary mention in 771. It is supposed, however, that the constituent community of Altenkirchen, with its much older church, is some years older than Erda and that owing to its smallness was not mentioned earlier. In the 14th century, the Counts of Solms built Hohensolms Castle.

As part of Hesse's municipal reforms, the constituent communities of Erda, Hohensolms and Ahrdt first merged voluntarily in 1972, followed a few months later by Großaltenstädten. Altenkirchen and Mudersbach were amalgamated with the greater community in 1977 by state law.

== Politics ==
=== Municipal council ===
The municipal elections on 26 March 2006 yielded the following results:

SPD	11 seats
CDU	10 seats
Greens	2 seats

Note: The FWG citizens' coalition lost both its seats from the 2001 election to the CDU.

=== Coat of arms ===
Hohenahr's civic coat of arms might heraldically be described thus: In Or an oak azure with six leaves and three acorns gules overlaid below with a concave point gules, therein a lion's head Or.

The thickly wooded community lies in the area of the former Solms Counties, which gave the arms the gold and blue. The six oak leaves stand for Hohenahr's six constituent communities.
