= Waldsolms =

- Municipality
- Coat of arms

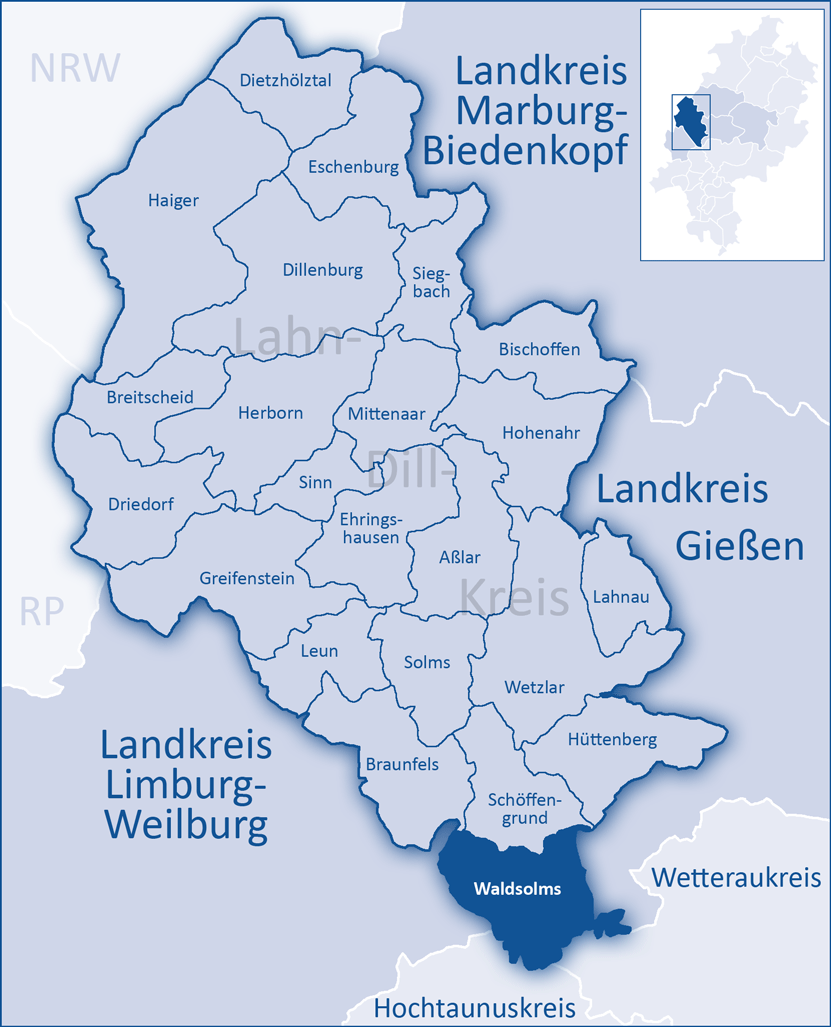
- Location of Waldsolms within Lahn-Dill-Kreis district
- Interactive map of Waldsolms
- Location within Germany Location within Hesse
- Coordinates: 50°25′N 08°31′E
- Country: Germany
- State: Hesse
- Admin. region: Gießen
- District: Lahn-Dill-Kreis

Government
  - Mayor (2023–29): Roland Hörster

Area
  - Total: 44.75 km^{2} (17.28 sq mi)
- Elevation: 277 m (909 ft)

Population (2025-12-31)
  - Total: 4,663
  - Density: 104.2/km^{2} (269.9/sq mi)
- Time zone: UTC+01:00 (CET)
  - Summer (DST): UTC+02:00 (CEST)
- Postal codes: 35647
- Dialling codes: 06085
- Vehicle registration: LDK
- Website: www.waldsolms.de

Waldsolms is a municipality located in the Lahn-Dill-Kreis in Hesse, Germany.

== Geography ==
=== Location ===
Waldsolms lies in the Hochtaunus Nature Park between Wetzlar and Usingen.

=== Neighbouring communities ===
Waldsolms is bordered on the north by the town of Braunfels and the community of Schöffengrund (both in the Lahn-Dill-Kreis), on the east by the community of Langgöns (Gießen district), on the southeast by the town of Butzbach (Wetteraukreis), on the south by the community of Grävenwiesbach (Hochtaunuskreis) and on the west by the community of Weilmünster (Limburg-Weilburg).

=== Constituent communities ===
The community consists of the six centres of Brandoberndorf (administrative seat), Griedelbach, Hasselborn, Kraftsolms, Kröffelbach and Weiperfelden.

== History ==
As part of Hesse's municipal reform, the aforesaid communities voluntarily joined together on 1 January 1972 to form the new greater community.

== Politics ==
=== Partnerships ===
Waldsolms maintains a partnership with the following place:

- Laudun-l'Ardoise in the département of Gard, France, in the Rhône Valley

== Economy and infrastructure ==
=== Transport ===
Since 2000, Brandoberndorf has been the terminus of the Taunusbahn railway, run as Rhein-Main-Verkehrsverbund line 15 by the Hessische Landesbahn GmbH. It is part of a once abandoned Deutsche Bahn line that now sees new life as a commuter railway. The stretch from Grävenwiesbach to Brandoberndorf was brought back into service in 2000 after the line's great success since 1993, when service began.
