= Bischoffen =

- Municipality
- Coat of arms

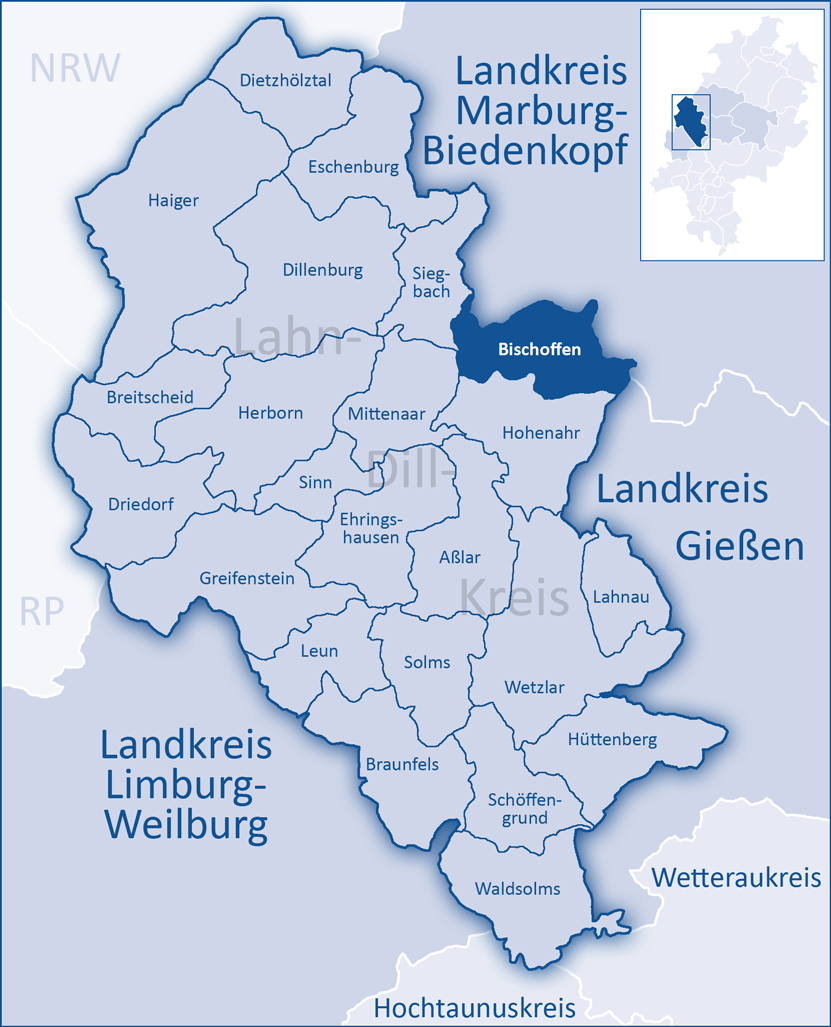
- Location of Bischoffen within Lahn-Dill-Kreis district
- Interactive map of Bischoffen
- Location within Germany Location within Hesse
- Coordinates: 50°42′N 08°23′E
- Country: Germany
- State: Hesse
- Admin. region: Gießen
- District: Lahn-Dill-Kreis

Government
  - Mayor (2022–28): Marco Herrmann

Area
  - Total: 35.37 km^{2} (13.66 sq mi)
- Elevation: 307 m (1,007 ft)

Population (2025-12-31)
  - Total: 3,093
  - Density: 87.45/km^{2} (226.5/sq mi)
- Time zone: UTC+01:00 (CET)
  - Summer (DST): UTC+02:00 (CEST)
- Postal codes: 35649
- Dialling codes: 06444
- Vehicle registration: LDK
- Website: www.bischoffen.de

Bischoffen (German pronunciation: [ˈbɪʃɔfn̩]) is a municipality in the Lahn-Dill-Kreis in Hesse, Germany.

== Geography ==
=== Location ===
Bischoffen lies in the Lahn-Dill Highland at the Aar Dam (Aartalsperre). This dam holds back the river Aar, a tributary to the Dill, forming a 57-ha lake whose purpose is mainly flood control, although of course it also has its recreational uses.

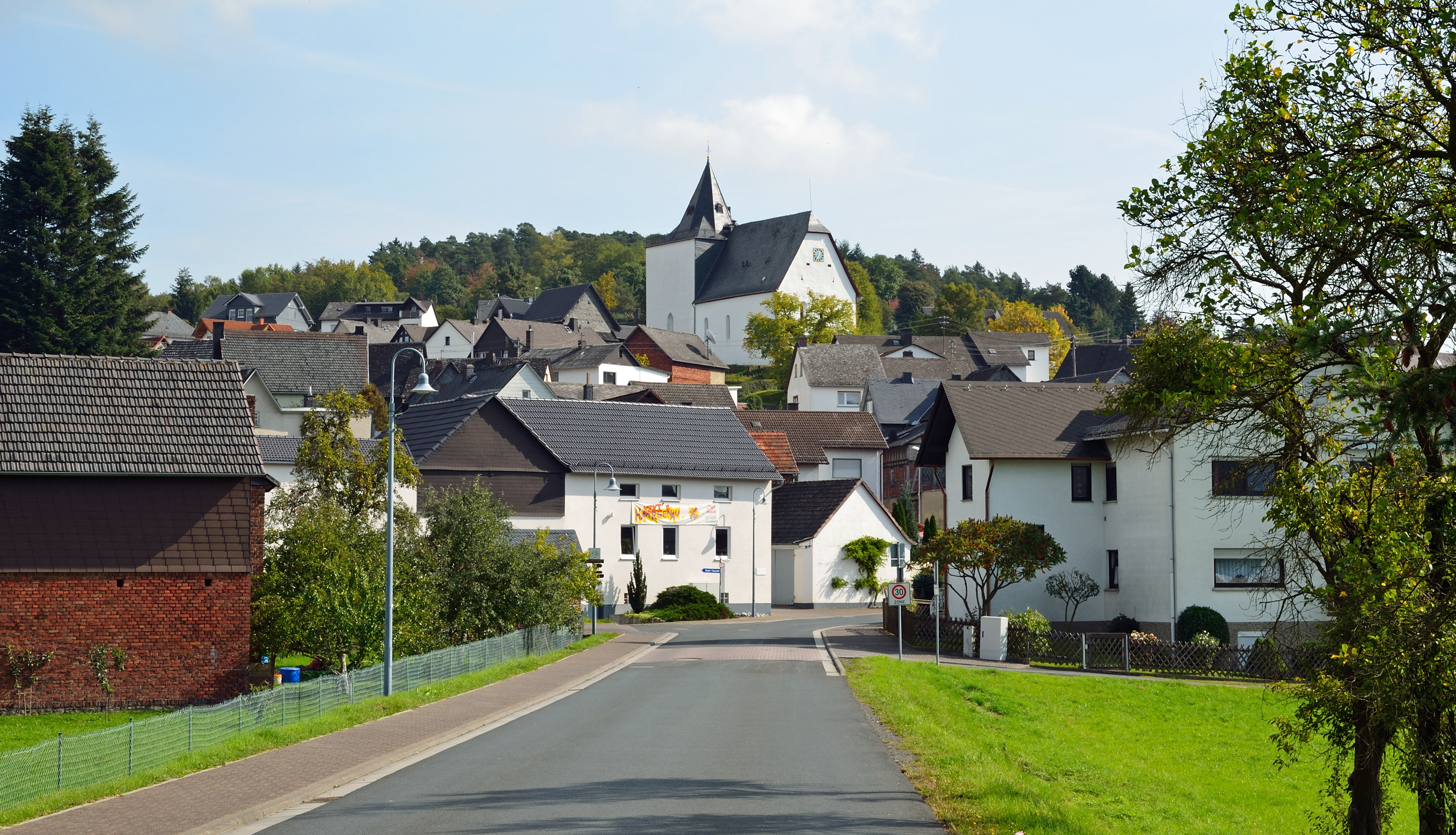
Niederweidbach with the Marienkirche

==== Niederweidbach ====
Lying among the villages of Bischoffen (itself a constituent municipality, and indeed the municipality's namesake, but not the biggest centre therein), Oberweidbach, Roßbach, Mudersbach and Ahrdt, Niederweidbach is found right on the shore of the Aartalsee, the man-made lake created by the Aar Dam. It is also on the stretch of Federal Highway (Bundesstraße) B 255 between Herborn and Gladenbach.

q.v. Niederweidbach's history

=== Neighbouring municipalities ===
Bischoffen borders in the north on the municipality of Bad Endbach and the town of Gladenbach, in the east on the municipality of Lohra (all three in Marburg-Biedenkopf), in the southeast on the municipality of Biebertal (Gießen district), in the south on the municipality of Hohenahr, in the southwest on the municipality of Mittenaar, and in the west on the municipality of Siegbach (all three in the Lahn-Dill-Kreis).

=== Constituent municipalities ===
The municipality consists of the centres of Bischoffen, Niederweidbach, Oberweidbach, Roßbach and Wilsbach.

Niederweidbach is Bischoffen's biggest municipality, and its administrative seat.

== History ==
Niederweidbach and Oberweidbach were mentioned in the Fulda Monastery's Codex Eberhardi quite early on, in 802. The other municipalities' first documentary mentions followed lin the late 13th or early 14th century. The villages belonged to various ecclesiastical and secular rulers, but a great deal of the current municipal area came to be part of the County of Solms as time went by, through estate division, pledges and feuds.

Among the four local powers, namely the Landgraves of Hesse, the Electors of Mainz, the Free Imperial City of Wetzlar and the Counts of Nassau, the political climate was seldom calm. In the Thirty Years' War, the inhabitants suffered neediness, hardship and destruction. The villages only slowly recovered from all this.

Today's Bischoffen was, in the Middle Ages, split into the two municipalities of Oberbischoffen and Niederbischoffen (Ober– = Upper; Nieder– = Lower). Oberbischoffen died out during the Plague and other epidemics and was forsaken. Niederbischoffen was then, in later documents, called simply Bischoffen. Bischoffen earned itself special importance with the building of the Cologne-Leipzig commercial road, along whose route the Aar-Salzböde railway and Federal Highway (Bundesstraße) B 255 were later built.

With the onset of the 19th century, the area was once again divided: Bischoffen, Niederweidbach and Roßbach passed to the Grand Duchy of Hesse, and Ahrdt and Mudersbach to the Kingdom of Prussia. Up until municipal reform in 1972, the municipality's outlying centres belonged to the Biedenkopf district, but given their location and economic orientation, they were assigned to the new Lahn-Dill-Kreis.

=== Niederweidbach's history ===
After its first documentary mention in the Codex Eberhardi in 802 as "Weidenbach", the village was divided into two, Oberweidbach and Niederweidbach, in the 14th century, much as had been done with neighbouring Bischoffen. In 1432, the villages were granted to the House of Solms-Hohensolms, and passed to the Count of Solms-Hohensolms in 1606. As of 1628, they belonged to the Landgraviate of Hesse-Darmstadt.

== Politics ==
=== Municipal council ===
The municipal elections on 26 March 2006 yielded the following results:

CDU	9 seats
FWG	7 seats
SPD	4 seats
Kommunal Direkt	3 seats

Note: FWG is a citizens' coalition.

=== Coat of arms ===
Bischoffen's civic coat of arms might heraldically be described thus: A bend wavy argent, above, in azure the crook of a bishop's crozier sinister Or, below, in vert an inverted scallop shell Or.

The wavy bend stands for the river Aar, which flows through the municipality. The crook stands for the municipality's name (from German Bischof – bishop). The scallop shell stands for Saint James the Great, Niederweidbach's patron saint, whose traditional symbol is this shell.

== Sightseeing ==
=== Marienkirche ===
The wall tower in Niederweidbach, built out of parts of the town wall, itself built in the 11th century, was converted into a chapel – as Niederweidbach belonged to Altenkirchen Parish – by the Reverend Hartong, and further expanded in 1498 on the west side with a proper church nave.

== Literature ==
- 802–2002 – Weidbach 1200 Jahre – Ein Heimatbuch, published by the Interessensgemeinschaft Weidbacher Vereine e.V. in 2002 for Niederweidbach's and Oberweidbach's 1200-year jubilee.
