= Lahn-Dill-Kreis =

Coordinates: 50°39′N 8°22′E

- District
- Flag Coat of arms
- Country: Germany
- State: Hesse
- Adm. region: Gießen
- Founded: 1977
- Capital: Wetzlar

Government
  - District admin.: Wolfgang Schuster (SPD)

Area
  - Total: 1,066.51 km^{2} (411.78 sq mi)

Population (31 December 2025)
  - Total: 253,439
  - Density: 237.634/km^{2} (615.469/sq mi)
- Time zone: UTC+01:00 (CET)
  - Summer (DST): UTC+02:00 (CEST)
- Vehicle registration: LDK, DIL, WZ (Wetzlar only), before 1991: L
- Website: www.lahn-dill-kreis.de

Lahn-Dill is a Kreis (district) in the west of Hesse, Germany. Neighboring districts are Siegen-Wittgenstein, Marburg-Biedenkopf, Gießen, Wetteraukreis, Hochtaunuskreis, Limburg-Weilburg, Westerwaldkreis.

== History ==
The southern district belonged to the Princes of Solms-Braunfels and the Free Imperial City of Wetzlar. The latter had to give up its imperial freedom in 1803 as a result of the Imperial Deputation, then as the county of Wetzlar, in favor of the newly created Grand Duchy of Frankfurt of the prince primate (in the old empire Reichserzkanzler) Karl Theodor von Dalberg. The former Solmsian territories came to the Duchy of Nassau in 1806 and in 1815 also to Prussia in an exchange. In 1816, the Prussian districts of Wetzlar and Braunfels were created, which were united in 1822 to form the district of Wetzlar. The district belonged to the Prussian Rhine Province as an exclave until 1932. Since the Middle Ages, the northern part of the district belonged to the principality of Nassau-Dillenburg, which was part of the French-occupied Grand Duchy of Berg between 1806 and 1813, and to the principality of Nassau-Oranien between 1813 and 1815, which was absorbed into the Duchy of Nassau in 1816. This formed the two offices of Herborn and Dillenburg. After the Prussian annexation of the Duchy of Nassau in September 1866, both offices were united to form the Dillkreis.

After World War II, the entire district area as it is today became part of the state of Hesse. In the course of the territorial reform in Hesse, the Lahn-Dill district was formed on 1 January 1977. The new district consisted of

- the entire area of the dissolved Dillkreis with the cities of Dillenburg, Haiger and Herborn as well as the municipalities of Breitscheid, Dietzhölztal, Driedorf, Eschenburg, Greifenstein, Mittenaar, Siegbach and Sinn
- the largest part of the dissolved district of Giessen with the towns of Allendorf (Lumda), Grünberg, Hungen, Laubach, Lich, Linden and Staufenberg as well as the municipalities of Buseck, Fernwald, Langgöns, Lollar, Pohlheim, Rabenau and Reiskirchen
- part of the dissolved district of Wetzlar with the towns of Braunfels and Leun and the municipalities of Aßlar, Biebertal, Bischoffen (formerly Biedenkopf district), Ehringshausen, Hohenahr, Hüttenberg, Schöffengrund, Solms and Waldsolms.

The new district had an area of 1,695 km^{2} (654 sq mi) and included a total of 36 municipalities. The seat of the district administration became the simultaneously formed district-free city Lahn. This was created by uniting the district-free city of Giessen with the city of Wetzlar, 13 other municipalities from the district of Wetzlar and the municipality of Heuchelheim from the district of Giessen.

Due to strong protests, mainly from the people of Wetzlar, the territorial reform was partially reversed. As from 1 August 1979 the city of Lahn was dissolved again and the Lahn-Dill district was reorganized:

- The restored city of Wetzlar and the newly formed municipality of Lahnau were incorporated into the Lahn-Dill district.
- The municipality of Biebertal as well as all municipalities belonging to the district of Giessen until 1976 left the Lahn-Dill district and came to the newly established district of Giessen.

Since then, the Lahn-Dill district has comprised 23 towns and municipalities on an area of 1,066.5 km^{2} (411.8 sq mi).

== Geography ==
The main rivers of the district are the Lahn and the Dill, which also gave it the name. It is mountain landscape with the Westerwald in the west, the Taunus in the south, the Lahn-Dill-Bergland in the east and the Rothaargebirge of the Sauerland in the north. The highest elevation with 671 m (2,201 ft) is near Rittershausen (part of Dietzhölztal), the lowest with 135 m (443 ft) is in the Lahn valley in Biskirchen (part of the town of Leun).

== Coat of arms ==
The coat of arms shows the imperial eagle in the top, a sign for the imperial city Wetzlar. The bottom part – taken from the arms of the previous Dillkreis – shows the lion of Nassau and the horn of the princes of Orange-Nassau, which later became the Dutch royal family. Dillenburg was the capital of the county of Nassau and later of Nassau-Orange.

== Towns and municipalities ==
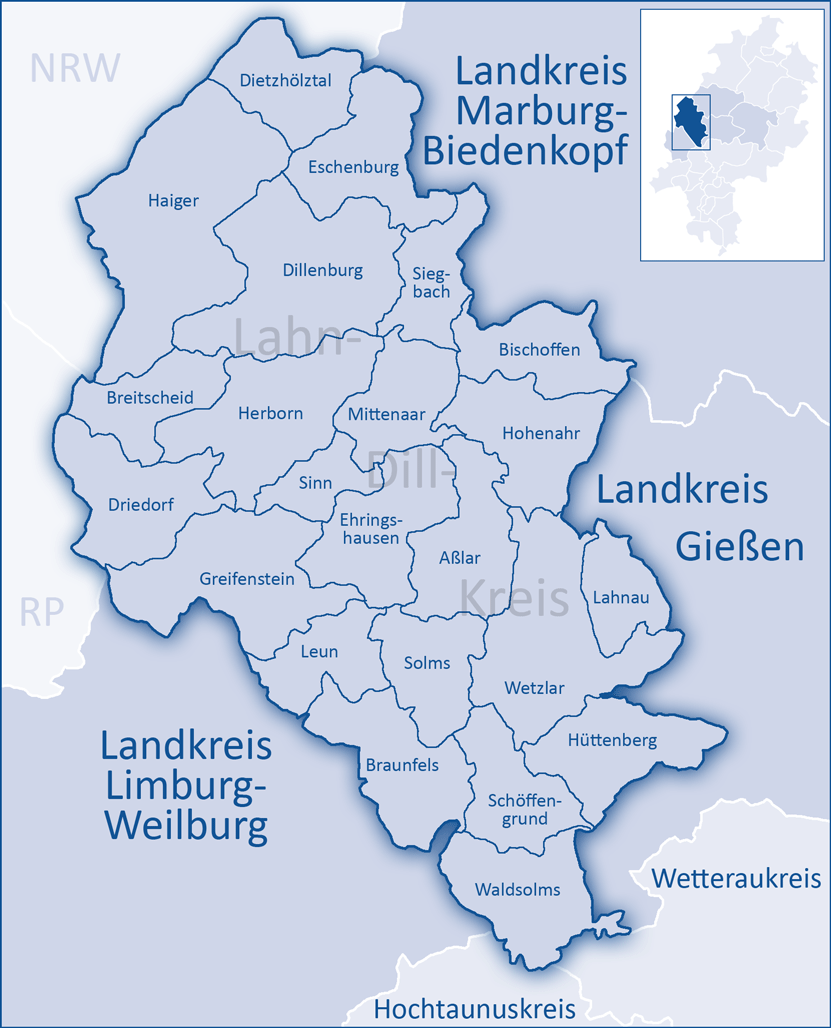
Clickable map of towns and municipalities in the district

Towns
1. Aßlar
2. Braunfels
3. Dillenburg
4. Haiger
5. Herborn
6. Leun
7. Solms
8. Wetzlar
Municipalities
1. Bischoffen
2. Breitscheid
3. Dietzhölztal
4. Driedorf
5. Ehringshausen
6. Eschenburg
7. Greifenstein
8. Hohenahr

9. Hüttenberg
10. Lahnau
11. Mittenaar
12. Schöffengrund
13. Siegbach
14. Sinn
15. Waldsolms

== Transport ==
Rhein-Main-Verkehrsverbund (RMV)

Railway lines in service and partly located in the Lahn-Dill district are the Dill railway, the Heller Valley railway and the Lahn Valley Railway.

The Cross Westerwald Railway (Montabaur - Wallmerod - Westerburg - Rennerod - Herborn) also is located partly in the Lahn-Dill district, although it is only in service for freight transport between Montabaur and Wallmerod. The interest group IG Westerwald-Querbahn e. V. (IWQ) also uses it for touristic draisine rides between Fehl-Ritzhausen and Rennerod.

The Lahn-Dill district is located in the area of the transport association Rhein-Main-Verkehrsverbund (RMV).
