= Schöffengrund =

- Municipality
- Coat of arms

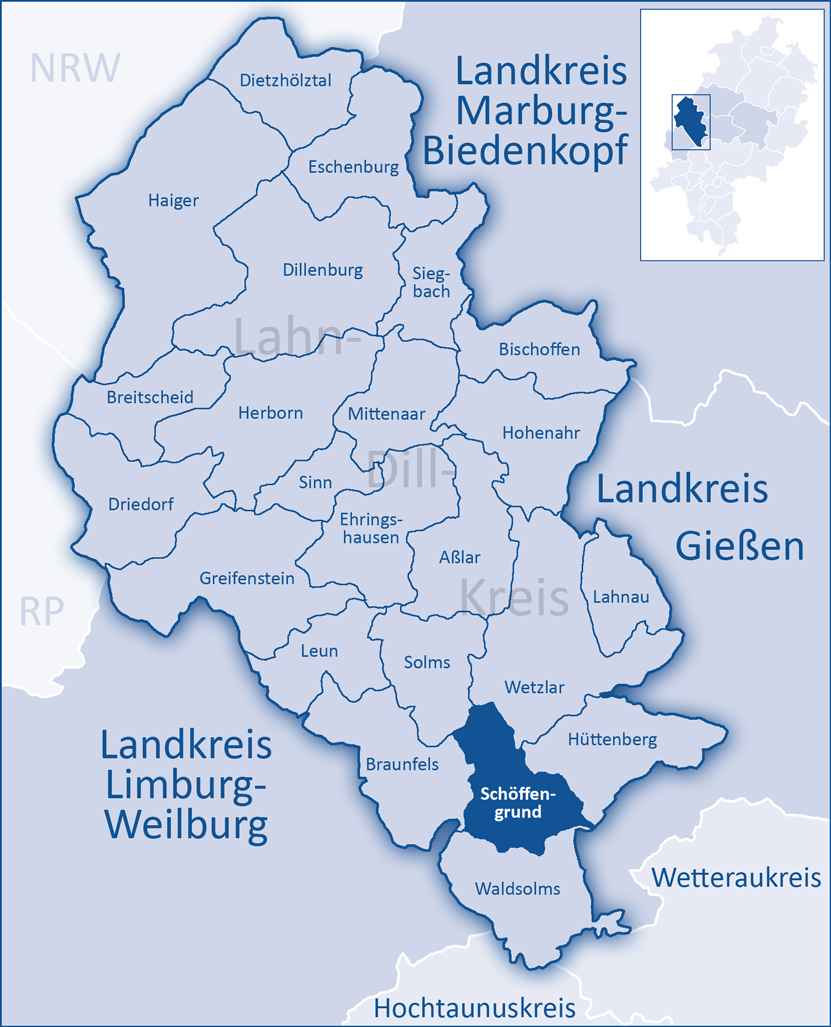
- Location of Schöffengrund within Lahn-Dill-Kreis district
- Interactive map of Schöffengrund
- Location within Germany Location within Hesse
- Coordinates: 50°29′N 08°29′E
- Country: Germany
- State: Hesse
- Admin. region: Gießen
- District: Lahn-Dill-Kreis

Government
  - Mayor (2022–28): Michael Peller

Area
  - Total: 34.11 km^{2} (13.17 sq mi)
- Elevation: 285 m (935 ft)

Population (2025-12-31)
  - Total: 6,573
  - Density: 192.7/km^{2} (499.1/sq mi)
- Time zone: UTC+01:00 (CET)
  - Summer (DST): UTC+02:00 (CEST)
- Postal codes: 35641
- Dialling codes: 06445
- Vehicle registration: LDK
- Website: www.schoeffengrund.de

Schöffengrund (German pronunciation: [ˈʃœfn̩ˌɡʁʊnt]) is a municipality in the Lahn-Dill-Kreis in Hesse, Germany.

== Geography ==
=== Location ===
Schöffengrund lies only a few kilometres south of Wetzlar in the Hochtaunus Nature Park.

=== Neighbouring municipalities ===
Schöffengrund borders in the north on the towns of Solms and Wetzlar, in the east on the municipality of Hüttenberg (all three in the Lahn-Dill-Kreis), in the southeast on the municipality of Langgöns (Gießen district), in the south on the municipality of Waldsolms, and in the west on the town of Braunfels (both in the Lahn-Dill-Kreis).

=== Constituent municipalities ===
The municipality consists of the centres of Laufdorf, Niederquembach, Niederwetz, Oberquembach, Oberwetz and Schwalbach.

== History ==
As part of Hesse's municipal reforms, the municipalities of Schwalbach, Laufdorf, Niederquembach, Niederwetz, Oberquembach and Oberwetz merged on 1 January 1972 and chose the historic name Schöffengrund, which does back to the old court region, the so-called "Quembacher Gericht", which was held at the "stone" near Oberquembach. This was where the Schöffen ("jurymen") from distinguished families in the villages that belonged to the court met for the court's sittings. Grund is German for "ground".

== Politics ==
=== Municipal council ===
The municipal elections in 2011 yielded the following results:

SPD	8 seats
FWG	11 seats
CDU	5 seats
Greens	5 seats
UWG	2 seats

Note: FWG and UWG are citizens' coalitions.

=== Partnerships ===
The municipality of Schöffengrund maintains partnerships with the following places:

- Chauray in the département of Deux-Sèvres, France since 1990
- (Germany) Langewiesen, Thuringia since 1992.
