= Hüttenberg =

- Municipality
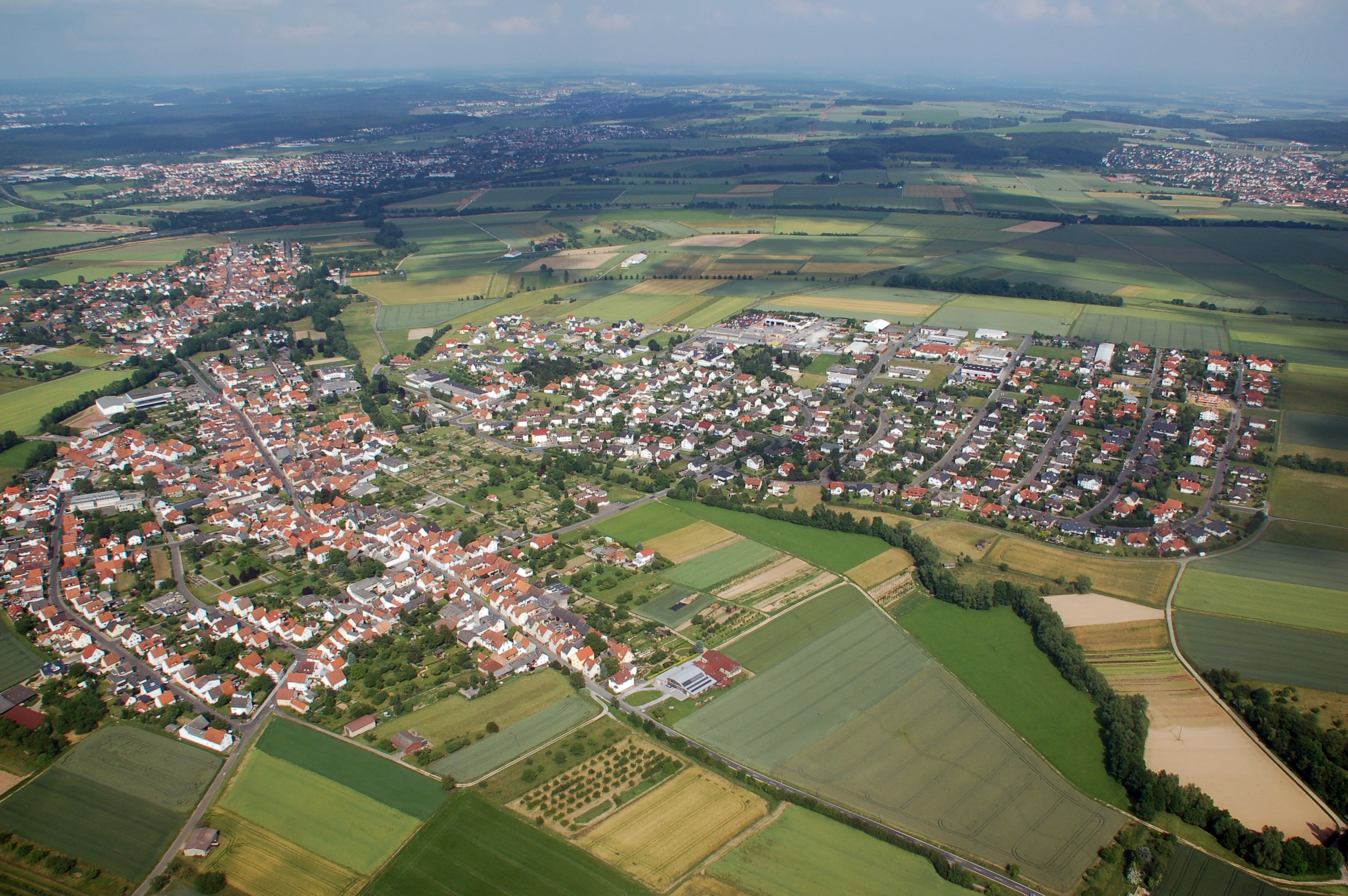
- Aerial view

- Coat of arms

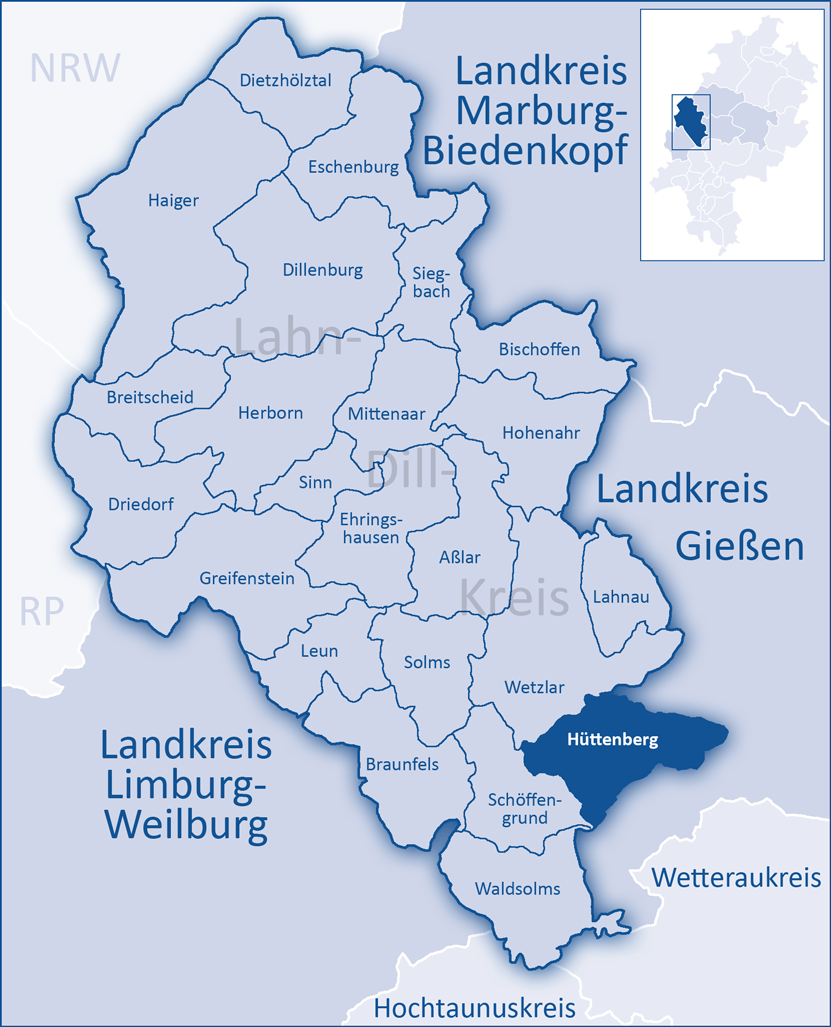
- Location of Hüttenberg within Lahn-Dill-Kreis district
- Interactive map of Hüttenberg
- Location within Germany Location within Hesse
- Coordinates: 50°30′N 08°37′E
- Country: Germany
- State: Hesse
- Admin. region: Giessen
- District: Lahn-Dill-Kreis

Government
  - Mayor (2023–29): Oliver David Holz (FW)

Area
  - Total: 40.74 km^{2} (15.73 sq mi)
- Elevation: 296 m (971 ft)

Population (2025-12-31)
  - Total: 10,512
  - Density: 258.0/km^{2} (668.3/sq mi)
- Time zone: UTC+01:00 (CET)
  - Summer (DST): UTC+02:00 (CEST)
- Postal codes: 35625
- Dialling codes: 06441, 06445, 06447, 06403
- Vehicle registration: LDK
- Website: www.huettenberg.de

Hüttenberg (German pronunciation: [ˈhʏtn̩bɛʁk]) is a municipality in the Lahn-Dill-Kreis in Hesse, Germany.

== Geography ==
=== Location ===
Hüttenberg lies about 6 km southeast of Wetzlar and 10 km southwest of Giessen south of the river Lahn.

=== Neighbouring municipalities ===
Hüttenberg borders in the west on the municipality of Schöffengrund, in the north on the town of Wetzlar (both in the Lahn-Dill-Kreis) and the town of Giessen, in the northeast on the town of Linden, and in the east and south on the municipality of Langgöns (both in Giessen district).

=== Constituent municipalities ===
The municipality consists of the centres of Hüttenberg (earlier Hochelheim and Hörnsheim), Rechtenbach, Reiskirchen, Vollnkirchen, Volpertshausen and Weidenhausen.

== History ==
On 1 August 1968, Groß-Rechtenbach and Klein-Rechtenbach formed the new municipality of Rechtenbach, while Hochelheim and Hörnsheim formed the new municipality of Hüttenberg. On 1 January 1971, Rechtenbach, Vollnkirchen and Weidenhausen merged into the new municipality of Schwingbach. On 1 January 1977, the new greater municipality of Hüttenberg was formed out of Hüttenberg, Reiskirchen, Schwingbach and Volpertshausen.

In the years from 1910, Paul Schneider spent his youth in Hochelheim. He was later Hochelheim's and Dornholzhausen's Evangelical minister from 1926 to 1934. In 1939, he was murdered by the Nazis in Buchenwald concentration camp. A street and an Evangelical parish house in Hüttenberg are named after him. After the Second World War, many people driven out of the Sudetenland came here and contributed considerably to the municipality's economic growth, its cultural modernization and to changes in the municipality.

Hüttenberg has become well known for team handball and the municipality's gustatory speciality, Handkäse (literally "hand cheese", so called from its originally being shaped by hand), a pungent, sour-milk cheese. It is still produced in Hüttenberg today and sold all over Germany.

Hüttenberg is somewhat less well known – and somewhat more laid back as a result – for being a small recreation destination in the Taunus foothills. In summer, country parties and many traditional festivals take place around Hüttenberg.

== Politics ==
=== Municipal council ===
The municipal elections on 27 March 2011 yielded the following results:

FWG	9 seats, 27.4%
CDU	8 seats, 26.2%
SPD	8 seats, 25.9%
Greens	5 seats, 14.6%
FÖBH	1 seat, 4.5%

Note: The FÖBH (Free Ecological Citizens List of Hüttenberg) is a citizens' coalition politically close to the Greens.

=== Partnerships ===
Hüttenberg maintains partnerships with the following places:

- the market municipality of Göstling an der Ybbs, Lower Austria since 1991,
- (Germany) Oberschönau, Thuringia since 1992
- (France) the French municipality of Crémieu east of Lyon, since 1993.

== Personalities ==
- Horst Spengler, handball world champion of 1978.
- Samuel Harfst, musician
