= Dernbach Feud =

Military conflict

The Dernbach Feud (German: Dernbacher Fehde) was an over 100-year-long (c. 1230 – 1333) ongoing dispute in present-day Germany between the House of Nassau, several knightly families, and the Landgrave of Hesse. The conflict erupted mainly over property rights in Herborn and the surrounding area (the Herborner Mark).

The feud was named after the knightly House of Dernbach, a powerful Ganerbschaft (jointly owned inheritance) with almost sovereign rights. The Dernbachers, along with the Lords of Bicken (the present-day administrative center of Mittenaar), carried the primary burden of opposing Nassau’s quest for the territorial dominion of the area.

== Beginning of the feud ==
In the middle of the 12th century, the emerging House of Nassau greatly expanded its possessions. In 1231, it received the sovereignty over the Herborner Mark as a sub-fief from the Landgrave of Thuringia, who had been awarded it by Emperor Frederick I Barbarossa. As early as 1230, violent incidents between the local nobility and Nassau were reported. By the death of Count Henry (Heinrich) II, the Rich in 1251, the feud was already in full swing.

The cause of the feud was the ambition of Nassau to curtail or take away the rights (including mining, hunting, and customs rights) and possessions (forests and ore mines in the Schelderwald) of the local aristocracy. The Landgraves of Thuringia and later of Hesse supported the local nobility. The leading figures of the lower nobility against Nassau were the Lords of Dernbach. Parallel with this conflict, Count Henry II was also fighting a vendetta against the Knight of Wilnsdorf in the Siegerland, who soon allied himself with the Dernbachers.

Not much is known about the fighting itself, but presumably it followed the usual pattern of feuds: essentially the looting and devastation of enemy possessions. At the beginning of the feud, according to tradition, Nassau destroyed a castle of the Dernbachers near Herborn, in the territory of the present-day borough of Seelbach, and the small Hessian castle of Lixfeld. However, historians cannot substantiate this allegation. In connection with the feud, Nassau constructed their first castle near Dillenburg and the Herborn Castle.

When the Countship of Nassau was divided in 1255 under Henry II’s sons Walram II and Otto I, the Dernbacher Feud had its first mention in the corresponding document. There are reports that sporadic fighting continued during the reign of Henry I of Nassau-Siegen (1270–1343). It must have been during this time that the Dernbachers received support from neighboring Lords of Bicken, who came to Hainchen.

By around 1250 the Landgraves of Hesse, who in regard to the Herborner Mark were the feudal lords of the Counts of Nassau, had also become involved in the feud. This was possibly in connection with the War of the Thuringian Succession. Landgrave Henry I built a castle at Eisemroth (the present-day administrative center of Siegbach) in 1307-1308 for protection against Nassau. On 9 November 1309, the Dernbachers sold their home castle, the small water castle Alt-Dernbach, to the new Landgrave Otto I and received it back as a fiefdom. This was presumably because its finances were heavily affected by the feud.

Otto undertook to further expand the castle, to bring the city under its protection to prevent it from falling into the hands of Nassau. Apparently, this allowed the Dernbachs to strongly assert themselves against Nassau again.

On June 26, 1312, Landgrave Otto I concluded an agreement with several members of the House of Nassau. It committed both sides in the future to no longer build castles against each other, and the Nassaus conceded that they could not restrict the rights are the Lords of Dernbach and Wilnsdorf. Afterwards the feud seems to have cooled somewhat, because by 1325 Nassau had bought some of the possessions of the Dernbachers, Bickeners, and the Bickeners of Hainchen, which brought them a stable power base, particularly in the court of Ebersbach (present-day Ewersbach in Dietzhölztal).

In 1325, the feud erupted anew with great hardship. In this time, among other things, the wooden castle of Nassau at Dillenburg was burnt down. Presumably in the same year Henry I of Nassau-Siegen destroyed the Castle (Alt-) Dernbach, the headquarters of the Dernbachers. The Castle Wallenfels, built by the Landgrave in 1320, was apparently surrendered in battle and came securely into Nassau’s possession (though later it had to be held “open” to the Landgrave). The Landgrave thus lost important bases in the disputed territory and so in 1326 built the new Hessenwald Castle, near the present site of Roth at the Heligenberg, strategically advantageously located on the remaining possessions of the Lords of Bicken, and likewise protecting the Breidenbacher area.

One of the major battles, lost by Hesse, took place in 1327 in Seibertshausen (a village on the Gladenbach Uplands, later abandoned and eventually incorporated into Weidenhausen, now part of Gladenbach). However, Landgrave Henry II of Hesse later won the battle on 10 August 1328 at Wetzlar, in which Count John of Nassau-Dillenburg (a son of Otto I) was killed.

== End of the Feud ==
With the loss of Dernbach Castle, the feud was lost for the knightly house based there. On 21 May 1333 it concluded a contract with Henry I of Nassau-Siegen, in which it sold all of rights in the Herborn and the Herborner Mark and many other rights in smaller settlements. The Dernbachers retained only the religious patronage rights and 13 courts in smaller villages. In 1334 Henry III of Nassau-Dillenburg was finally given Wallenfels Castle by Landgrave Henry II. On 30 July, a contract was once more concluded between Nassau and the Dernbachers, in which questions about the rights from the first peace treaty were clarified.

On 21 May 1336 an agreement was also concluded between the Lords of Bicken and Nassau, in which they sold Hainchen Castle (with the bulk of the property belonging to it) to the Count, but received rights to reign around Ebersbach.

In 1350, the Lords of Dernbach, with the help of the Lords of Bicken in Hainchen and with the support of the Landgrave, built the castle of New Dernbach in the Hessian territory of Blankenstein (Gladenbach). After the end of the feuds, the boundaries between Hessen and Nassau in the area were set, which remain still today as district boundaries.

On 21 April 1486, a Heidenrich of Dernbach sold his remaining serfs in the Nassau area to the local count for a low price. With this, the Lordship of Dernbach was finally transferred to Nassau.
