= Siegbach =

- Municipality
- Coat of arms

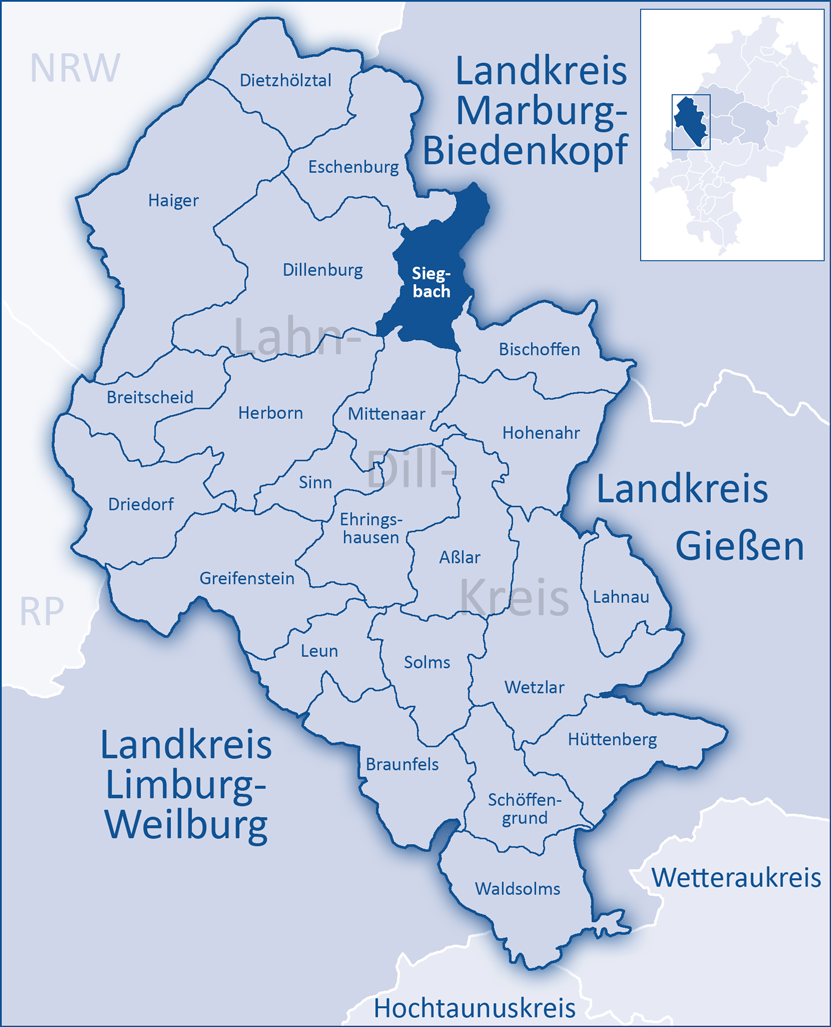
- Location of Siegbach within Lahn-Dill-Kreis district
- Interactive map of Siegbach
- Location within Germany Location within Hesse
- Coordinates: 50°44′N 08°25′E
- Country: Germany
- State: Hesse
- Admin. region: Gießen
- District: Lahn-Dill-Kreis

Government
  - Mayor (2021–27): Maik Trumpfheller

Area
  - Total: 29.08 km^{2} (11.23 sq mi)
- Elevation: 350 m (1,150 ft)

Population (2025-12-31)
  - Total: 2,496
  - Density: 85.83/km^{2} (222.3/sq mi)
- Time zone: UTC+01:00 (CET)
  - Summer (DST): UTC+02:00 (CEST)
- Postal codes: 35768
- Dialling codes: 02778
- Vehicle registration: LDK
- Website: www.siegbach.de

Siegbach is a municipality in the Lahn-Dill-Kreis in Hesse, Germany.

== Geography ==
=== Location ===
The community of Siegbach lies in the Lahn-Dill Highland in the valley of its namesake brook, the Siegbach, which empties into the Aar to the south at Bischoffen.

More than half of the municipal area is wooded.

=== Neighbouring communities ===
Siegbach borders in the north on the communities of Eschenburg (Lahn-Dill-Kreis) and Angelburg, in the south on the communities of Bischoffen and Mittenaar, in the southwest on the town of Herborn, and in the west on the town of Dillenburg (all in the Lahn-Dill-Kreis).

=== Constituent communities ===
The community consists of the five centres of Eisemroth (administrative seat), Oberndorf, Tringenstein, Übernthal and Wallenfels.

== History ==
As part of Hesse's municipal reforms, the formerly independent municipalities of Eisemroth, Tringenstein, Übernthal and Wallenfels merged on 1 January 1972 to form the greater community of Siegbach, after the communities of Oberndorf and Eisemroth had already been united for a year. The new community's namesake is the brook in whose valley the greater part of the community lies.

Within the municipal area once stood three castles, namely in Eisemroth (on whose site a church now stands), Wallenfels and Tringenstein. They came into being during the "Hundred Years' Dernbacher Feud", which was hard-fought in this area. It was a struggle waged between 1233 and 1333 between the Lords of Dernbach and the ambitious Counts of Nassau, who eventually won.

== Politics ==
=== Coat of arms ===
Siegbach's civic coat of arms might heraldically be described thus: In vert on ground Or a mine gallery sable with framework Or, therein, a crossed hammer and pick (the traditional mining tools or Gezähe) argent.

The arms refer to the municipal area's former mining industry.

== Sightseeing ==
The Wilhelmsteine ("William's Stones"), lying between Tringenstein and Wallenfels, are a group of pyrite monadnocks in the middle of the Schelderwald (a foothill of the Rothaargebirge range). Every year on Ascension Day, the Wilhelmsteine serve as a local pilgrimage place. A religious service is performed among them on this day.

The Wilhelmsteine, named after Count Wilhelm of Nassau, were in earlier times known as the Buschsteine. They were presumably the pre-Christian central holy place of the whole surrounding area. Nearby, at the Angelburg, from the early to high Middle Ages was an important crossroads of old long-distance trade roads. The Hohe Straße (High Road) or as it was also known Herborner Straße (Herborn Road) coming from the northeast crossed the great east-west trade road there, the Brabant Road, which ran from Leipzig by way of Cologne to the province of Brabant (nowadays in Belgium). Locally, it was also known as the Schelderwald Weg, and in old documents as strada publica (the public road). The Westfalen Weg (Westphalia Way) also joined the knot of log-distance roads here, following more or less today's Highway L3047 up to the Zollbuche ("Customs Beech" – a tree that marked a border in days of yore), and then reaching the Angelburg by way of Günterod and Salzbödesattel. Continuing north on this route, one could reach Bremen.

At the Angelburg, evidence of an important prehistoric settlement has been found.

Castle ruins can be found at Tringenstein and Wallenfels (only rubble heaps and dry moats).
