= Ehringshausen =

- Municipality
- Coat of arms

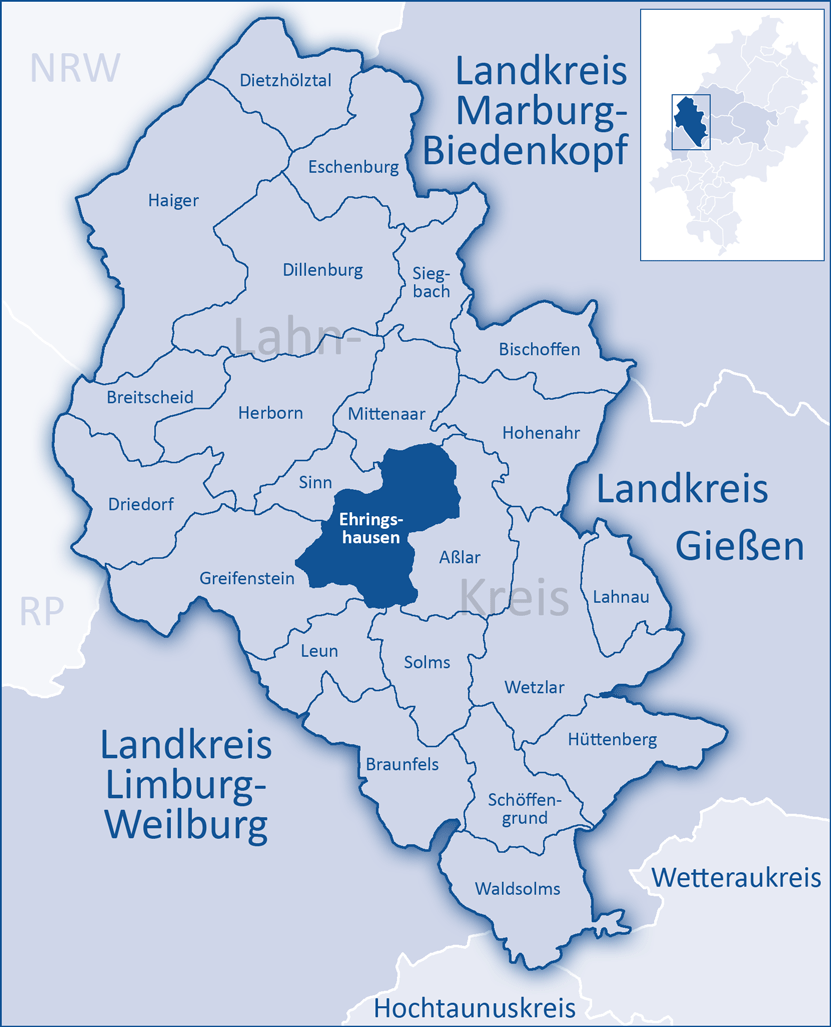
- Location of Ehringshausen within Lahn-Dill-Kreis district
- Interactive map of Ehringshausen
- Location within Germany Location within Hesse
- Coordinates: 50°36′N 08°23′E
- Country: Germany
- State: Hesse
- Admin. region: Gießen
- District: Lahn-Dill-Kreis

Government
  - Mayor (2021–27): Jürgen Mock (SPD)

Area
  - Total: 45.43 km^{2} (17.54 sq mi)
- Elevation: 186 m (610 ft)

Population (2025-12-31)
  - Total: 9,271
  - Density: 204.1/km^{2} (528.5/sq mi)
- Time zone: UTC+01:00 (CET)
  - Summer (DST): UTC+02:00 (CEST)
- Postal codes: 35630
- Dialling codes: 06443, 06440, 06449
- Vehicle registration: LDK
- Website: www.ehringshausen.de

Ehringshausen (German pronunciation: [eːʁɪŋsˈhaʊzn̩]) is a municipality in the Lahn-Dill-Kreis in Hesse, Germany.

== Geography ==
=== Location ===
Ehringshausen lies in the valley of the Dill between Wetzlar and Herborn.

=== Neighbouring communities ===
Ehringshausen borders in the north on the community of Mittenaar, in the east on the town of Aßlar, in the south on the towns of Solms and Leun, and in the northwest on the community of Sinn (all in the Lahn-Dill-Kreis).

=== Constituent communities ===
The community has nine centres named Breitenbach, Daubhausen, Dillheim, Dreisbach, Ehringshausen, Greifenthal, Katzenfurt, Kölschhausen and Niederlemp.

== History ==
Ehringshausen had its first documentary mention in 802 in a donation document in the Lorsch codex. According to this document, Inric gave the Lorsch Monastery a fortified yard in the Barcdorfer Mark in the Lahngau. Barcdorf lay near today's Ehringshausen on the Dill's right bank. Whether it can be regarded as Ehringshausen's direct forerunner is, however, unclear.

The oldest centre in the community is, however, not the namesake centre, but rather Breitenbach, which had its first documentary mention in 778.

== Politics ==
Ehringshausen was a stronghold of the extreme rightwing and nationalist National Democratic Party of Germany. For several decades, they have been represented on municipal council, even after the 2001 elections when their share of the vote fell from about 22% to 7.1%. In the 2006 municipal elections, they suffered a further setback when their share fell to only 4.9%. This still translated into two council seats.

=== Municipal council ===
The municipal elections on 27 March 2011 yielded the following results:

Parteien und Wählergemeinschaften		% 2011	Sitze 2011	% 2006	Sitze 2006
SPD	Sozialdemokratische Partei Deutschlands	37,7	12	35,4	11
CDU	Christlich Demokratische Union Deutschlands	35,1	11	36,4	11
FWG	Freie Wählergemeinschaft e.V. Ehringshausen	22,8	7	23,3	7
GRÜNE	Bündnis 90/Die Grünen	4,4	1	–	–
NPD	Nationaldemokratische Partei Deutschlands	–	–	4,9	2
gesamt		100,0	31	100,0	31
Wahlbeteiligung in %		43,0		45,1	

Note: FWG is a citizens' coalition.

=== Coat of arms ===
The two charges in the shield of Ehringshausen's civic coat of arms represent different aspects of the community's history, both dating back many centuries. The point, somewhat resembling a church steeple, stands for the local church, and the cogwheel for what was until 1956 the local industry – iron mining.

=== Partnerships ===
Ehringshausen maintains partnerships with the following places:

- Roquemaure, France since 28 April 1973
- Haverhill, United Kingdom since 16 April 1983
- (Germany) Neustadt am Rennsteig, Thuringia since 11 May 1991

== Transport ==
Through Ehringshausen run Autobahn A 45, with its Ehringshausen interchange, and the Siegen–Gießen railway line, with its Katzenfurt and Ehringshausen (Kr Wetzlar) stations. These are served hourly on workdays, and two-hourly Sundays and holidays by DB Regio Regionalbahn services between Dillenburg and Gießen.

== Personalities ==
- Frank Paulus (1978- ), German footballer
- Christoph Nix (1954- ), jurisprudential scholar and theatre manager
- Dominik Stroh-Engel (1985- ), German footballer
- Friedrich Weber (1949- ), state bishop
- Gesa Felicitas Krause, athlete
