= Herr, wir bitten: Komm und segne uns =

- Christian hymn
- English: Lord, we pray: Come and bless us
- Written: 1977
- Text: by Peter Strauch
- Language: German
- Melody: by Peter Strauch
- Composed: 1977
- Published: 1979

"Herr, wir bitten: Komm und segne uns" (Lord, we pray: Come and bless us) is a Christian hymn in German requesting blessing. Both text and music were written in 1977 by Peter Strauch. The song of the genre NGL, appeared in hymnals of several denominations and in many other hymnals and songbooks.

== History ==
Peter Strauch, who wrote both text and melody of "Herr, wir bitten: Komm und segne uns" in 1977, is a theologian of an Evangelical free church in Germany, He first worked as a tool maker and then studied theology at the Theologischea Seminar des Bundes Freier evangelischer Gemeinden Deutschlands in Ewersbach. He was a pastor in Hamburg-Sasel where he was responsible for young people from 1973 to 1983. Together with his brother Diethelm, he organised Singefreizeiten, two weeks of meetings of young people from different congregations, who afterwards took new songs home and passed them on to their parishes. "Herr, wir bitten: Komm und segne uns" was written for a meeting in 1977. Strauch would become Bundespfleger in the national Bund Freier evangelischer Gemeinden in Deutschland, and from 1991 to 2008 its president.

The song in five stanzas and a refrain deals with blessings in a challenging world. The refrain requests peace, blessing hands and the touch of God's power. The stanzas mention situations into which the singers are sent to be a blessing: night and sadness in the first stanza, guilt and mockery in the second, strife in the third and suffering in the fourth. The fifth stanza looks at life after the needs of the earth. The singers feel sent to bring joy, to forgive, to announce peace and to live God's love.

The song that appeared first in a songbook at a youth meeting in 1977 was first published in a song collection by Hänssler in 1979. It became part of the Protestant hymnal Evangelisches Gesangbuch as EG 590. It was included in several regional sections of the Catholic hymnal in German Gotteslob in 2013, such as GL 850 in the Diocese of Limburg, classified as suitable for children, as GL 843 in Münster, and GL 832 in Würzburg. It is also contained in many other hymnals and songbooks.
