= Breitscheid, Hesse =

Breitscheid
- Municipality
- Coat of arms

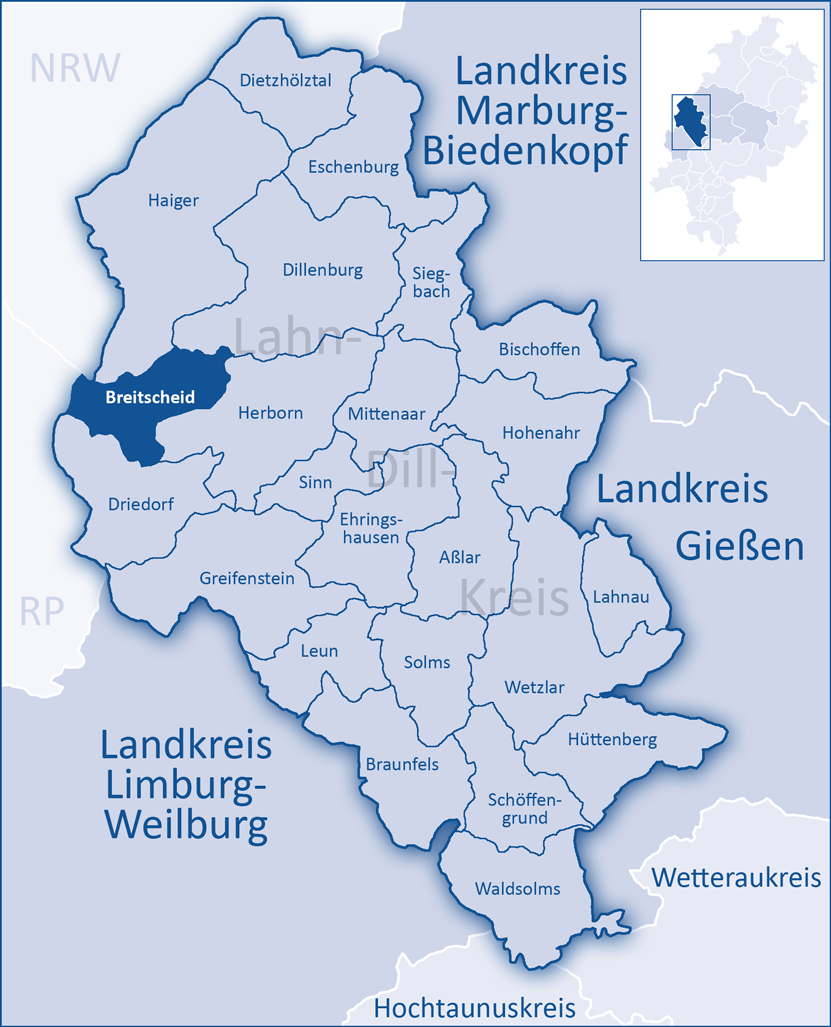
- Location of Breitscheid within Lahn-Dill-Kreis district
- Interactive map of Breitscheid
- Location within Germany Location within Hesse
- Coordinates: 50°41′N 08°12′E
- Country: Germany
- State: Hesse
- Admin. region: Gießen
- District: Lahn-Dill-Kreis

Government
  - Mayor (2019–25): Roland Lay

Area
  - Total: 31.71 km^{2} (12.24 sq mi)
- Elevation: 462 m (1,516 ft)

Population (2025-12-31)
  - Total: 4,495
  - Density: 141.8/km^{2} (367.1/sq mi)
- Time zone: UTC+01:00 (CET)
  - Summer (DST): UTC+02:00 (CEST)
- Postal codes: 35767
- Dialling codes: 02777
- Vehicle registration: LDK
- Website: www.gemeinde-breitscheid.de

Breitscheid (German pronunciation: [ˈbʁaɪtˌʃaɪt]) is a municipality in the Lahn-Dill-Kreis in Hesse, Germany.

== Geography ==
=== Location ===
Breitscheid lies from 266 to 600 m above sea level on the eastern slope of the Westerwald range at the point shared by three German states: Hesse, Rhineland-Palatinate and North Rhine-Westphalia.

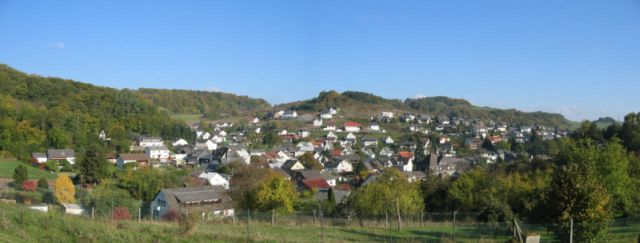
Panorama of Erdbach.

Erdbach, a constituent municipality, lies in an interesting place with regards to Earth's history, in the eastern part of the Westerwald, near that range's highest peak, Fuchskauten (657 m).

=== Geology ===
In the Erdbach area are noteworthy limestone deposits from various geological time periods. "Erdbach limestone" from Lower Carboniferous times gave an era the name "Erdbachium". The Erdbach – the village's namesake brook – disappears into a karst system, and does not appear again for 1.5 km where it can be seen in a quarry.

Not far from there, the "Homberg" fossil reserve was instituted, which serves some university institutes from Jena to the Rhine as a research area. The older limestone formation near Breitscheid (main centre) stems from a subtropical coral reef from the Devonian period (mid-Palaeozoic, 400,000,000 years ago).

In the "stone chambers" of the Rolsbach valley, some gravesites from Hallstatt times (about 550 BC) were unearthed in 1884. In archaeology, there is a special burial ornament called an "Erdbach coil torc" (Erdbacher Wendelhalsring). It is also believed that Neanderthal people once lived nearby, but this belief awaits further discovery.

=== Neighbouring municipalities ===
Breitscheid borders in the north on the municipality of Burbach (Siegen-Wittgenstein district in North Rhine-Westphalia), and the towns of Haiger and Dillenburg, in the east on the town of Herborn, in the south on the municipality of Driedorf (all in the Lahn-Dill-Kreis), and in the west on the municipalities of Willingen and Liebenscheid (both in the Westerwaldkreis in Rhineland-Palatinate).

=== Constituent municipalities ===
Aside from the main centre, which bears the same name as the whole, there are outlying centres called Erdbach, Gusternhain, Medenbach and Rabenscheid. The municipality came into being on 1 January 1977 as part of Hesse's municipal reforms. The constituent municipalities were formerly independent municipalities.

== Politics ==
=== Municipal council ===
The municipal elections on 14 March 2021 yielded the following results:

CDU	10 seats
FWG	9 seats
SPD	4 seats

Note: FWG is a citizens' coalition.

== Main sights ==
- Töpfermuseum Breitscheid (Breitscheid Pottery Museum) displays the development of pottery and has pottery products on display from the last 250 years.
- The old Fortress church in Breitscheid.
- Erdbacher Höhlen (caves), karst caves and a karst spring.
