= Eschenburg =

- Municipality
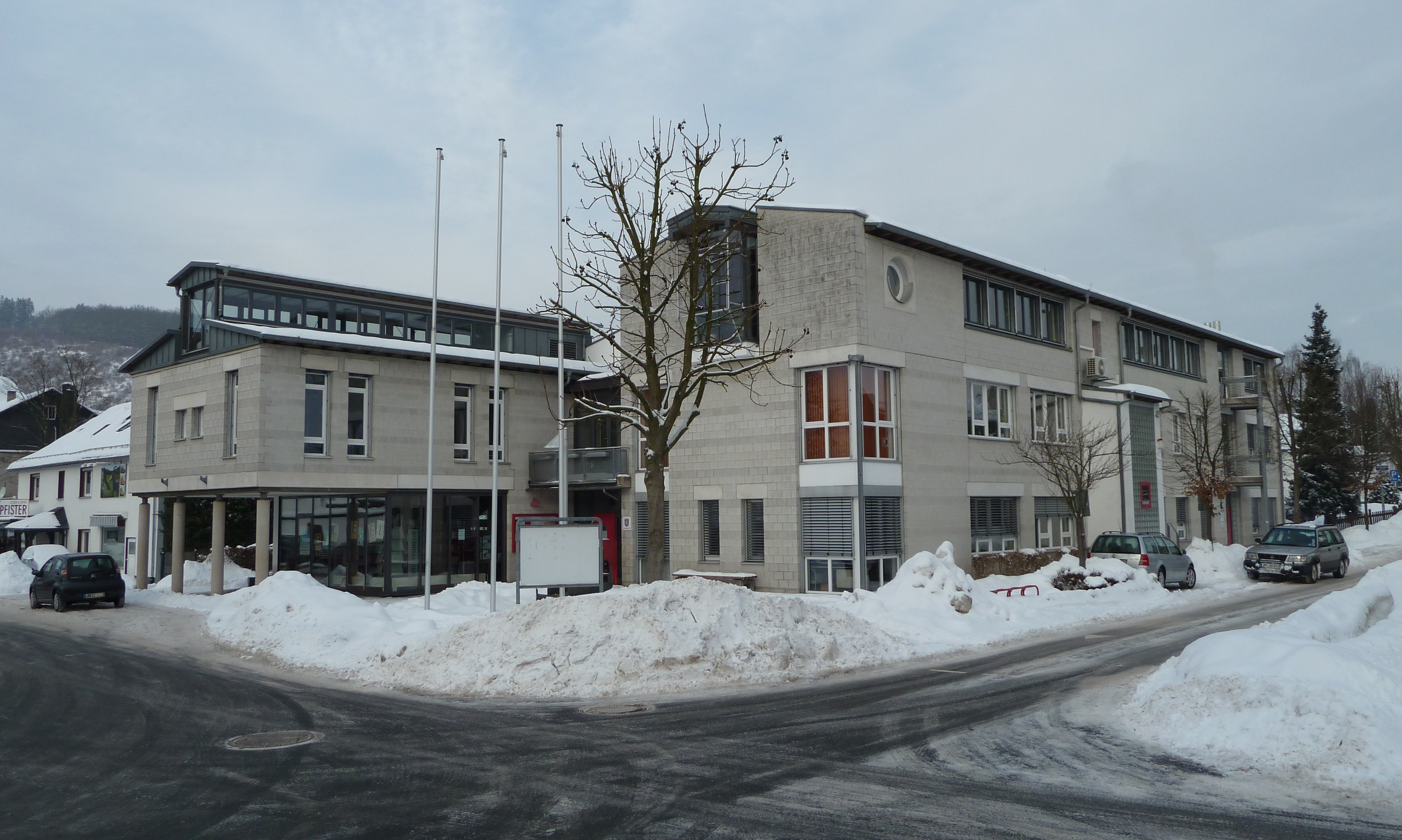
- Town hall

- Coat of arms

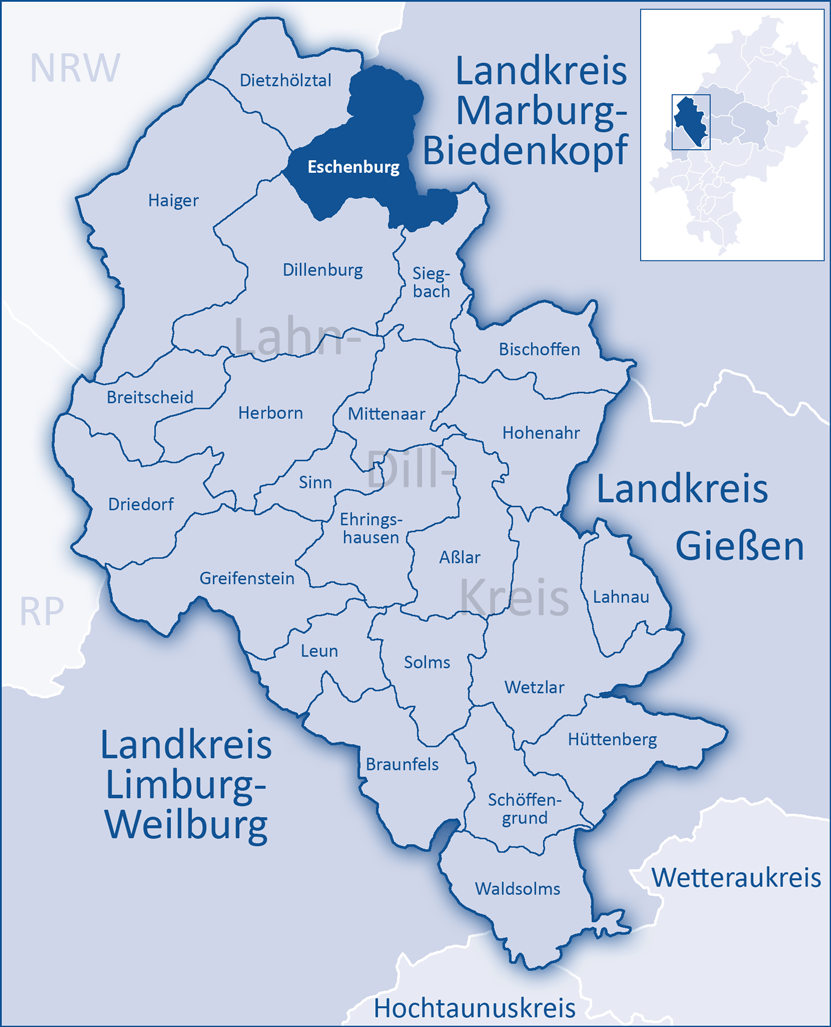
- Location of Eschenburg within Lahn-Dill-Kreis district
- Interactive map of Eschenburg
- Location within Germany Location within Hesse
- Coordinates: 50°49′N 08°22′E
- Country: Germany
- State: Hesse
- Admin. region: Gießen
- District: Lahn-Dill-Kreis

Government
  - Mayor (2022–28): Götz Konrad (Ind.)

Area
  - Total: 45.78 km^{2} (17.68 sq mi)
- Elevation: 425 m (1,394 ft)

Population (2025-12-31)
  - Total: 9,709
  - Density: 212.1/km^{2} (549.3/sq mi)
- Time zone: UTC+01:00 (CET)
  - Summer (DST): UTC+02:00 (CEST)
- Postal codes: 35713
- Dialling codes: 02774, 02770 Hirzenhain
- Vehicle registration: LDK, DIL
- Website: www.eschenburg.de

Eschenburg (German pronunciation: [ˈɛʃn̩bʊʁk]) is a municipality in the Lahn-Dill-Kreis in Hesse, Germany. The community inherited its name from nearby Eschenburg mountain.

== Geography ==
About 20 km², or 43.8%, of the municipal area is wooded, 9.85 km² of this being municipal forest, and the rest state forest.

=== Location ===
The individual communities within Eschenburg lie on the river Dietzhölze and in its side valleys and high dales in the Rothaargebirge's foothills. Eschenburg lies in the northern Lahn-Dill-Kreis, some 10 km northeast of Dillenburg and 23 km east of Siegen.

=== Neighbouring communities ===
Eschenburg borders in the north on the communities of Dietzhölztal (Lahn-Dill-Kreis) and Breidenbach, in the east on the communities of Steffenberg and Angelburg (all three in Marburg-Biedenkopf), in the south on the community of Siegbach, in the southwest on the town of Dillenburg, and in the west on the town of Haiger (all in the Lahn-Dill-Kreis).

=== Constituent communities ===
Eschenburg comprises the centres of Eibelshausen – which is also the administrative seat – Eiershausen, Roth, Simmersbach, Wissenbach, Hirzenhain Ort and Hirzenhain Bahnhof.

Centre	Population	Area (km²)	Area (%)	(31 December 2005)
Eibelshausen	4055	6.858	15.0%	
Eiershausen	992	5.487	12.0%	
Hirzenhain	2264	9.558	20.9%	
Roth	592	7.833	17.1%	
Simmersbach	1412	7.22	15.8%	
Wissenbach	1981	8.754	19.2%	
Eschenburg	11,296	45.71	100%	

== History ==
It is known from archaeological finds that there were settlers in what is today Eschenburg as far back as Celtic times. Eschenburg had its first documentary mention in the 13th century. Early on in its history, ores such as silver, nickel, copper and iron were being mined in various places, and slate and diabase were being quarried. This resulted in metalworking and hammering mills being established in the area. Recently, archaeological digs have shown the groundwork of a mediaeval forest smithy in Wissenbach.

The founding of the greater community came on 1 October 1971 through a voluntary merger of Eibelshausen, Eiershausen and Wissenbach. On 1 July 1974, the communities of Hirzenhain, Simmersbach and Roth, all from the former district of Biedenkopf, also joined, bringing today's greater community of Eschenburg into being two years before municipal reform. The 589 m-high mountain Eschenburg, seven kilometres northeast of Dillenburg, is the community's namesake.

Among the six constituent communities, Eibelshausen is the biggest. It serves as a centre point in the middle Dietzhölze Valley, is the administrative seat, and is the centre for secondary education with Haupt- and Realschule, and a gymnasial branch for ten villages in the communities of Eschenburg and Dietzhölztal.

== Culture, leisure and sightseeing ==
=== Museums ===
The Heimatmuseum (Local Museum) in Eibelshausen and Eschenburg-Dietzhölztal Culture Group offer many exhibits and a diverse cultural programme.

=== Sightseeing ===
Hirzenhain is a village more than 750 years old, with a glider airfield and a downhill skiing run. Its glider airfield is considered the second oldest in the world.

Glider flying is maintained by the Hirzenhain Gliding Club, but even non-members can take part for a small fee.

In the countryside around Simmersbach, the Philippsbuche ("Philip's Beech") recalls Landgrave Philip I's homecoming after a five-year Spanish-Dutch imprisonment on 10 September 1552.

=== Exercise, sport and leisure places ===
In Eschenburg there are many sport clubs in which one can practise almost any discipline, including football, handball, athletics, gymnastics, tennis, and so on.

- 3 gymnasia
- 1 ski run with lift
- 1 multi-purpose hall
- 7 sport fields
- 3 shooting ranges with clubhouse
- 5 tennis courts
- sports grounds
- fitness-studio
- football fields
- 2 long-distance cross-country skiing trails
- gliderport (gliding and hang-gliding)
- indoor swimming pool with outdoor basin and beach volleyball court

Barbecue areas and leisure facilities are available in the outlying centres. Nature trails through the woods, hiking trails, and protected areas for birds and scenery beckon hikers.

=== Historic personage ===
From Wissenbach came the violinist, violist, concert director and radical pietist religion founder Johann Daniel Müller, also known as Elias or Elias Artista first predicted by Paracelsus (born 10 February 1716 in Wissenbach, died sometime after 1785, presumably in Riga). His wife was a relative of Johann Wolfgang von Goethe.

== Economy and infrastructure ==
=== Established businesses ===
- BBT Thermotechnik GmbH Werk Eibelshausen
- Rittal Großschaltschränke GmbH & Co. KG Werk Wissenbach

=== Public institutions ===
- volunteer fire brigades in every centre
- indoor swimming pool
- Evangelical or open daycare centres in every centre
- Catholic daycare centre in Eibelshausen
- municipal library
- houses for public events in every centre
- Diakonie mobile care service

=== Education ===
- Primary schools in Eibelshausen, Wissenbach, Hirzenhain, Simmersbach and Eiershausen
- Holderbergschule (Hauptschule, Realschule, Gymnasium) in Eibelshausen
