= Aßlar =

- Town
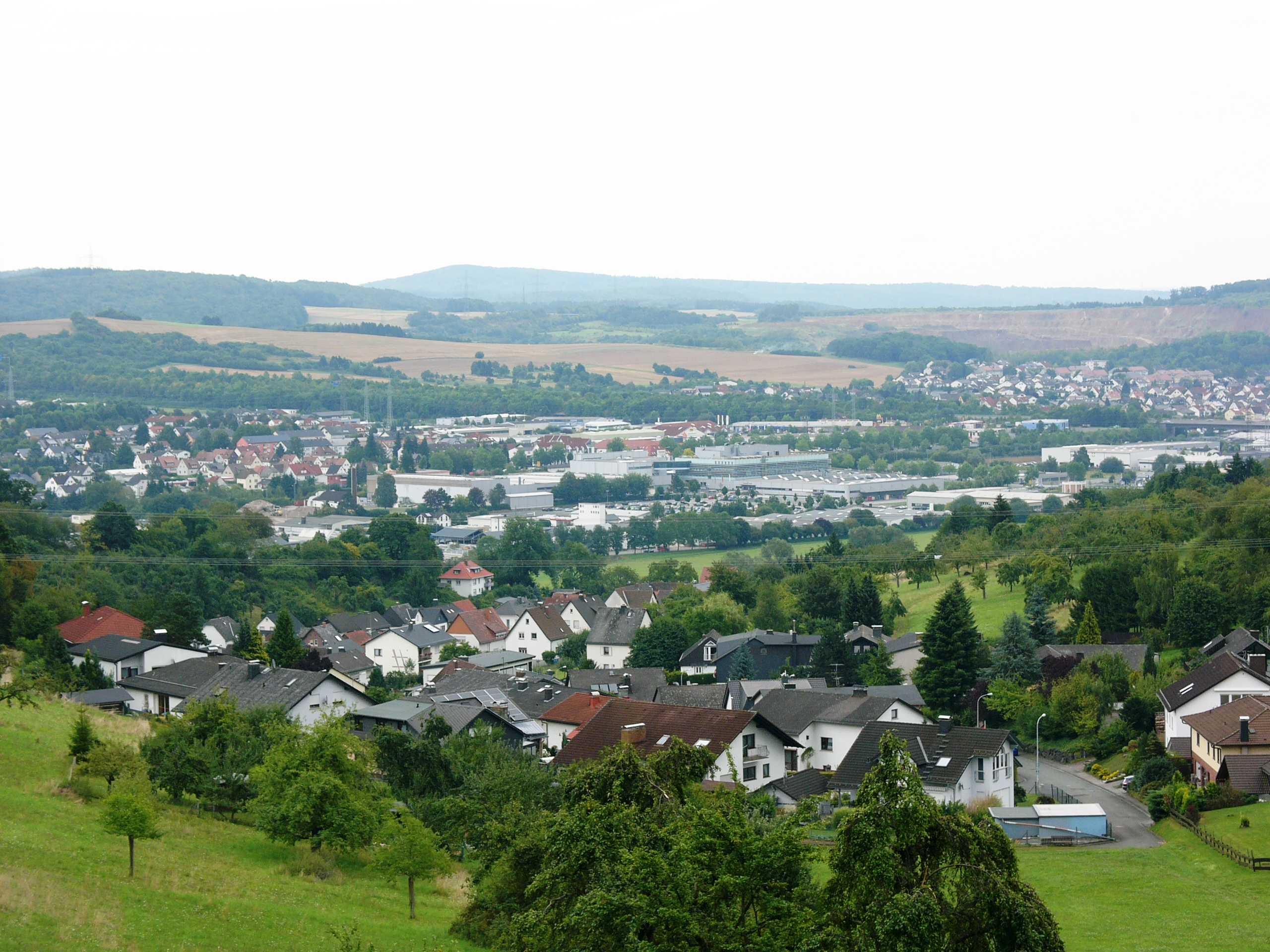
- General view

- Coat of arms

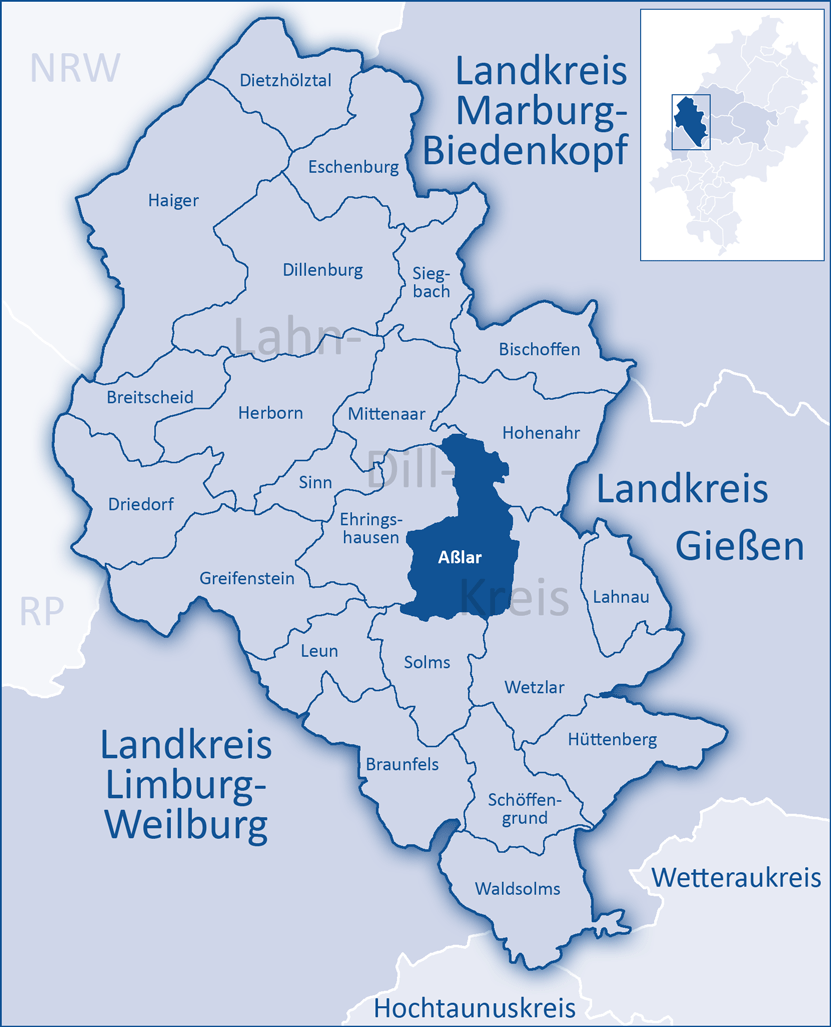
- Location of Aßlar within Lahn-Dill district
- Interactive map of Aßlar
- Location within Germany Location within Hesse
- Coordinates: 50°35′N 08°28′E
- Country: Germany
- State: Hesse
- Admin. region: Gießen
- District: Lahn-Dill
- Subdivisions: 6 Stadtteile/Stadtbezirke

Government
  - Mayor (2019–25): Christian Schwarz (FW)

Area
  - Total: 43.57 km^{2} (16.82 sq mi)
- Elevation: 175 m (574 ft)

Population (2025-12-31)
  - Total: 14,381
  - Density: 330.1/km^{2} (854.9/sq mi)
- Time zone: UTC+01:00 (CET)
  - Summer (DST): UTC+02:00 (CEST)
- Postal codes: 35614
- Dialling codes: 06441, 06443,06440, 06446
- Vehicle registration: LDK
- Website: www.asslar.de

Aßlar (or Asslar, [ˈaslaʁ]) is a town near Wetzlar in the Lahn-Dill-Kreis in Hesse, Germany.

== Geography ==
=== Location ===
Aßlar lies in the foothills of the Westerwald range and on the river Dill, which empties into the Lahn in neighbouring Wetzlar, about 5 km to the southeast. It is also not far from the "three-state-border", a geographical point common to the German states of Hesse, North Rhine-Westphalia and Rhineland-Palatinate, lying to the west.

The Aßlar community of Werdorf also lies on the River Dill, as do Klein-Altenstädten and Berghausen. Bechlingen, Oberlemp and Bermoll lie north of the main town, away from the river.

=== Neighbouring communities ===
Aßlar borders in the north on the communities of Mittenaar and Hohenahr, in the east on the town of Wetzlar, in the south on the town of Solms, and in the west on the community of Ehringshausen (all in the Lahn-Dill-Kreis).

=== Constituent communities ===
Aßlar is divided into the following communities or Stadtteile:

- Aßlar with Klein-Altenstädten
- Bechlingen
- Berghausen
- Bermoll
- Oberlemp
- Werdorf

The communities of Werdorf and Berghausen are so near each other that they merge one into the other, but are officially two Stadtteile, which may be considered "wards" or possibly "boroughs".

== History ==
Aßlar was first mentioned in A.D. 783 in a charter of an ecclesiastical grant copied into the Lorsch Codex (or Codex Laureshamensis in Latin).

Like many other places, Aßlar grew from a few great estates to about 5,000 by the time of the First World War, always forming a community with Klein-Altenstädten on the other side of the River Dill. Following the Second World War, a great number of refugees settled in the area from various lost German territories. The municipal reforms of 1977 led to its amalgamation with Bechlingen, Berghausen, Bermoll, Oberlemp and Werdorf to produce today's town of Aßlar.

Aßlar was granted town status in 1978.

=== Werdorf ===
In the Bronze Age, people settled on the Schönbach, which flowed through the area, as this stream was more easily forded than the broader River Dill. Werdorf was first mentioned in the historical record in A.D. 772.

"Werdorf" comes from an Old Germanic root "Wero", meaning "man". This root is common to many Germanic languages, and can also be seen in the English words "wergild" and "werewolf". Dorf is still the German word for a village, and has cognates in other Germanic languages, including "thorp" in English.

Tradition tells of a legend recounting how Werdorf got its name, namely:

There were once two countesses who were riding together along the Dill, when they found a place they rather liked, and they had a stately home built there. Since now the workmen were living here, one countess said "May it become a town!". The other answered "No, may it become a village!" (in German: "Nein, es werde ein Dorf!")

And so, from "Werd-Dorf" came the village's name.

== Politics ==
=== Town council ===
The municipal elections on 26 March 2006 yielded the following results:

FWG	14
SPD	11
CDU	9
Greens	2
FDP	1

Note: FWG is a citizens' coalition.

=== Coat of arms ===
Approval to bear a coat of arms and a flag was granted to the town in 1959 and 1960 by the Hessian government. The colors and heraldic composition of the arms, appear to originate with the Counts of Solms and the Lords of Bicken who are represented by the lion and the lozenge. They were the chief medieval noble families of the surrounding area. The hazelnut refers to that interpretation of the town's name, which derives it from the word "Haselare", where "Hasel" in "hazel" in German. This word was used in early medieval times for a sacred place separated from the profane by an enclosure of hazel rods. This sacred place was later appropriated by the local Christian bishop and a church was constructed on the site, which is still there today, and where Christian worship is conducted weekly.

=== Twin towns ===
Aßlar is twinned with Saint-Ambroix, France since 1966; and (Germany) Jüterbog, Brandenburg since 1991.

== Culture ==
=== Museums ===
There is the Museum of Local History at the Werdorfer Schloss in Werdorf, and the Grube Fortuna, a tourist mine outside Berghausen.

=== Buildings ===
The Werdorfer Schloss is a stately home built in Werdorf between 1680 and 1700 by the Counts of Solms-Greifenstein.

=== Music ===
The contemporary Christian band, Outbreakband, is based in Aßlar.

=== Clubs ===
There are some eighty clubs based in Aßlar.

== Economy and infrastructure ==
Aßlar is today a small industrial town with well-developed infrastructure, where the firms Pfeiffer Vacuum and Manfred Huck are established. The latter has its head office in Berghausen for the manufacture of quality nets and rope for sport, industry and education.

Also in Berghausen is a civic wireless local network using the 802.11g standard, for WiFi access to the Internet.

There are many public barbecues and hiking trails to be enjoyed in the surrounding area, as well as a public swimming pool.
