= Dominik Stroh-Engel =

German footballer

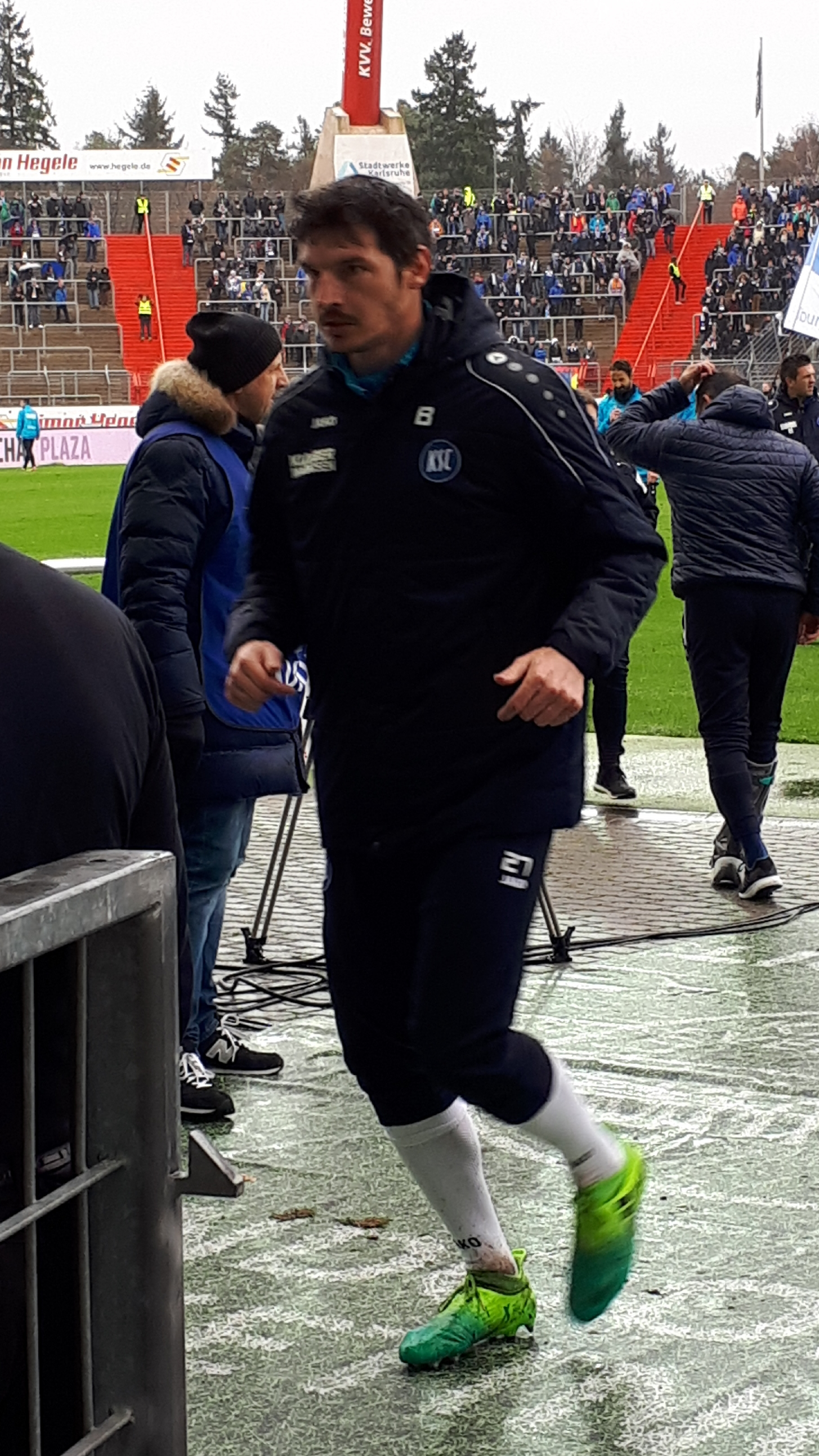
- Stroh-Engel in 2018

Personal information
- Date of birth: 27 November 1985 (age 40)
- Place of birth: Ehringshausen, West Germany
- Height: 1.97 m (6 ft 6 in)
- Position: Forward

Team information
- Current team: FC Memmingen
- Number: 9

Youth career
- 1992–2001: RSV Büblingshausen
- 2001–2003: FC Burgsolms

Senior career*
Years	Team	Apps	(Gls)
2003–2005	SC Waldgirmes	34	(14)
2005–2007	Eintracht Frankfurt II	36	(21)
2005–2007	Eintracht Frankfurt	3	(0)
2007–2010	Wehen Wiesbaden II	59	(30)
2007–2010	Wehen Wiesbaden	34	(8)
2010–2012	SV Babelsberg 03	71	(19)
2012–2013	Wehen Wiesbaden	34	(3)
2013–2017	Darmstadt 98	80	(36)
2017–2019	Karlsruher SC	27	(1)
2019–2021	SpVgg Unterhaching	62	(14)
2021	FC Kufstein	18	(14)
2022–2024	FC Memmingen	67	(18)
Total		525	(178)
- * Club domestic league appearances and goals

Dominik "Dodo" Stroh-Engel (born 27 November 1985) is a German professional former footballer who played as a forward.

== Career ==
Stroh-Engel was born in Ehringshausen. From 2005 until December 2006 he played for Eintracht Frankfurt. In the 2005–06 season he scored half of the goals of the reserves in the Oberliga. He played well at the indoor tournaments and made his first Bundesliga match against Hannover 96 when he came on as a substitute for Alexander Meier. He made three appearances before leaving in 2007 to sign for SV Wehen Wiesbaden. After the end of the 2009–10 season his contract with Wehen Wiesbaden was cancelled, and Stroh-Engel moved to SV Babelsberg 03. He returned to Wehen two seasons later, where he remained for one season.

In July 2013, Stroh-Engel joined Darmstadt 98. On 14 March 2014, he set a new 3. Liga record by scoring his 23rd goal of the season against Hansa Rostock. The previous record of 22 goals was set in the 2009–10 season by Régis Dorn of SV Sandhausen. He ended the season as the division's record top scorer, with 27 goals becoming a key factor in the surprise promotion of Darmstadt 98 into the German 2. Liga.

He scored a further nine goals in the 2. Bundesliga which helped in securing promotion to the Bundesliga.
