= Mittenaar =

- Municipality
- Coat of arms

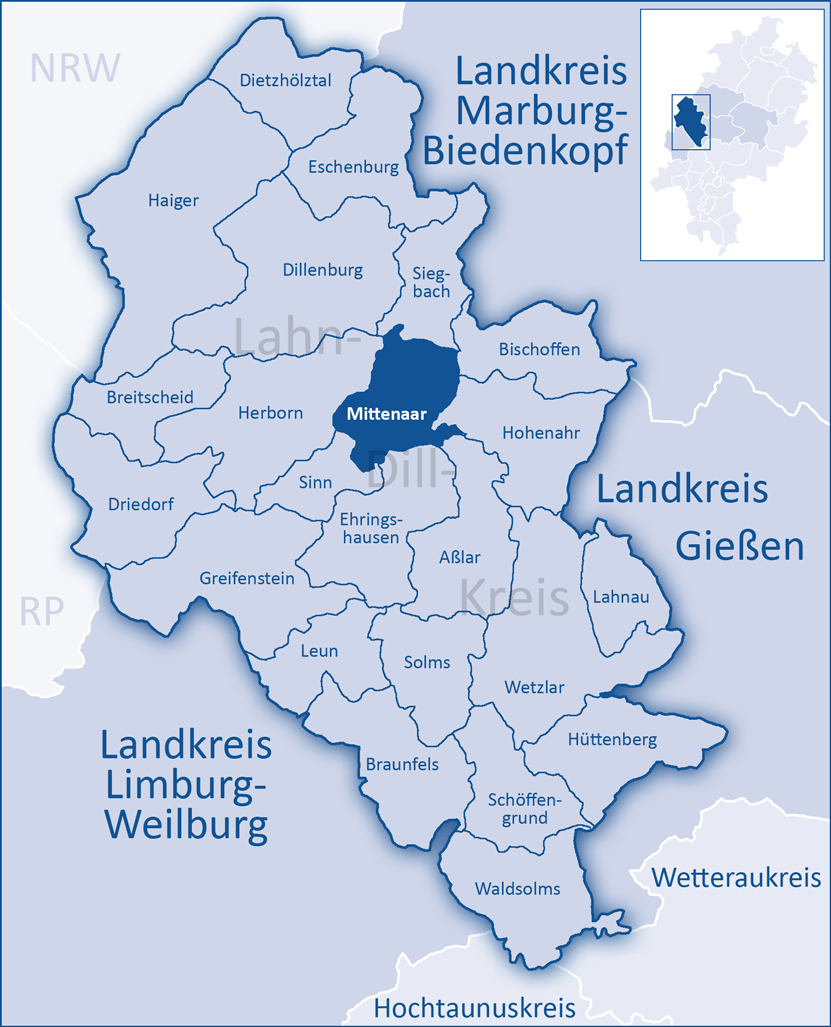
- Location of Mittenaar within Lahn-Dill-Kreis district
- Interactive map of Mittenaar
- Location within Germany Location within Hesse
- Coordinates: 50°42′N 08°23′E
- Country: Germany
- State: Hesse
- Admin. region: Gießen
- District: Lahn-Dill-Kreis

Government
  - Mayor (2019–25): Markus Deusing (SPD)

Area
  - Total: 35.17 km^{2} (13.58 sq mi)
- Elevation: 342 m (1,122 ft)

Population (2025-12-31)
  - Total: 4,623
  - Density: 131.4/km^{2} (340.4/sq mi)
- Time zone: UTC+01:00 (CET)
  - Summer (DST): UTC+02:00 (CEST)
- Postal codes: 35756
- Dialling codes: 02772 (Bicken, Ballersbach), 02778 (Offenbach), 06444 (Bellersdorf)
- Vehicle registration: LDK
- Website: www.mittenaar.de

Mittenaar (German pronunciation: [ˈmɪtn̩ˌʔaːɐ̯]) is a municipality in the Lahn-Dill-Kreis in Hesse, Germany.

== Geography ==
Mittenaar lies in the Lahn-Dill Highland. On Mittenaar's 3,518 ha (8,690 acres) live more than 5,000 people. About 45 km of roads connect the various centres. More than half the municipal area is wooded.

Mittenaar borders in the north on the community of Siegbach, in the northeast on the community of Bischoffen, in the east on the community of Hohenahr, in the southeast on the town of Aßlar, in the south on the community of Ehringshausen, in the southwest on the community of Sinn, and in the west on the town of Herborn (all in the Lahn-Dill-Kreis).

The community consists of the centres of Ballersbach, Bellersdorf, Bicken (administrative seat) and Offenbach.

== History ==
=== Mittenaar ===
The community of Mittenaar came into being on 1 January 1972 with the merger of the formerly independent municipalities of Ballersbach, Bicken and Offenbach. Bellersdorf was amalgamated on 1 April 1972.

=== Ballersbach ===
Ballersbach had its first documentary mention in 1270. The Ballersbach Church (Capelle zu Ballersbach) was also most likely built in this time. That the chapel had some special importance can clearly be seen in the much bigger village of Seelbach being placed under it.

Ballersbach grew together over time from two centres, one around the Baalerstaa (Balder- or Baldurstein; "Baldur Stone") and the other to the south.

About 1500, the church was painted with wonderful frescoes that eventually disappeared over time.

In the Thirty Years' War, the village was stricken with the then incurable Plague, which took 165 lives. In this dreadful time, only 85 villagers survived. It was more than one hundred years before Ballersbach recovered from this catastrophe.

In 1912 the church was heavily damaged when it was struck by lightning. As the church was being renovated, however, the frescoes came back to light. The pictures show, symbolically, mankind's history and Christianity's beginnings in a series of individual pictures.

In 1993, there was an extensive renovation of these artworks to ensure their continued existence for posterity.

=== Bellersdorf ===
Bellersdorf had its first documentary mention in 1294. For unknown reasons, the village was abandoned for about 200 years (about 1500-1699). It can only be assumed that the Plague struck here, too, or that war forced the villagers to flee.

Only in 1699 did some families settle in Bellersdorf again, with Count Ludwig von Hohensolms's permission.

Only after the Second World War, when improved transport connections eliminated the village's remote location as a problem did a great upswing begin. By participating in the contest "Unser Dorf soll schöner werden" ("Our village should become nicer"), Bellersdorf became known nationally. The advantageous location, the quiet and the lack of through traffic have made Bellersdorf into the constituent community with the highest quality of living.

=== Bicken ===
Bicken's coat of arms (as of 1952)

Bicken had its first documentary mention in a Cologne document in 1218. The village is, however, likely much older, as a castle from Frankish times reportedly once stood in Bicken.

The nobles of Bicken and Dernbach were subject to the Count of Nassau in the struggle for ascendancy in the Herborner Mark. As a result, various rights and estates had to be sold to the Nassauers.

Bicken's advantageous location (with connections to several long-distance roads) had both an upside and a downside in earlier times, leading time and again to uninvited visits by soldiers in the Thirty Years' War, whereby many lost belongings and even lives. In Napoleonic times, Bicken was made the hub of the Ballersbach-Bicken-Offenbach-Herbornseelbach area.

During both world wars, Bicken suffered great losses. In the First World War, 27 soldiers from Bicken died, and in the Second World War, 78.

==== Bicken's coat of arms ====
The village of Bicken bore no coat of arms in earlier times, and used no seal. The community was granted leave to bear a coat of arms in 1952. It might heraldically be described thus: In sable two bars argent. It is based on the old noble family's arms, who owned the village as vassals of the Counts of Nassau from 1327 to 1732. The arms have become part of Mittenaar's civic coat of arms.

=== Offenbach ===
Offenbach had its first documentary mention in one of Johann von Dernbach's documents.

In the dreadful years of the Thirty Years' War, Imperial General Philipp von Mansfeld's hordes overran the villages in the Aar Valley setting houses ablaze. In Offenbach, 60 burnt down, in Bicken 53 and in Ballersbach 18 buildings.

In a grim chapter between 1629 and 1630, thirty men and women (6 from Offenbach, 18 from Bicken and 6 from Ballersbach) were burnt at the stake in the persecution of witches by their own fellow villagers.

As for the oldest cultural monument, the tower at the Offenbach Church houses a bell from the year 1452, which has been in use uninterruptedly since then. The burgeoning population in 1955-1956 made church nave expansion necessary.

=== Coat of arms ===
Mittenaar's civic coat of arms might heraldically be described thus: In sable a bend wavy sinister Or, above, a trefoil Or, below, two bars argent.

The arms show besides a wavy fess as a symbol for the Aar, which flows through the community, two charges of former noble families who held sway in what is now the municipal area: the cloverleaf for the Lords of Dernbach and, as mentioned earlier, the two bars of the Lords of Bicken.

== Culture ==
=== Music ===
The youth choir "Young Voices Mittenaar" was brought together in January 2000 on an initiative by 3 choirs: MGV 1861 Ballersbach, GV Sängervereinigung 1860 Bicken and GV Eintracht Offenbach.

The repertoire includes spirituals, gospels, evergreens and modern pieces (for example Dancing Queen, Y.M.C.A, Wade in the water, Bridge over troubled water, and so on).

=== Regular events ===
- Haahepper (Friday and Saturday in July)

== Notable people ==
- Johann Heinrich Alsted (born mid-March 1588 in Ballersbach, died 9 November 1638 in Weißenburg (nowadays Alba Iulia), Romania), was a reformed theologian and polymath.

== Literature ==
- Helmut Groos (editor): Mittenaar – Ein Heimatbuch. Mittenaar, 1988
- Helmut Groos (editor): Heimat und Geschichte. Mittenaar – Ein Heimatbuch, Band II. Mittenaar, 2004
