= Eschenburg (hill) =

Hill in Hesse, Germany

- Eschenberg
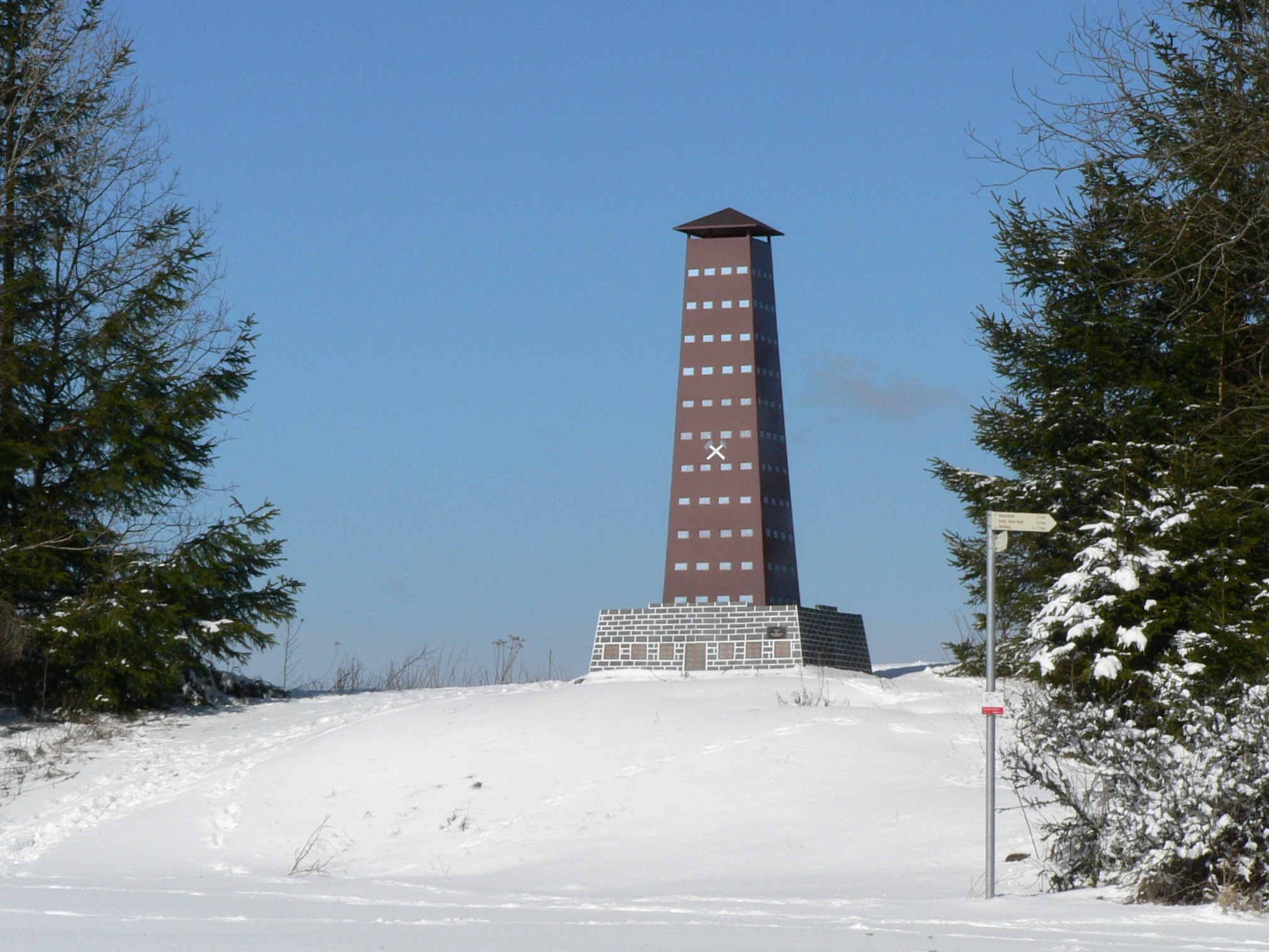

Highest point
- Elevation: 589 m (1,932 ft)
- Prominence: 90 m (300 ft)
- Parent peak: Angelburg
- Coordinates: 50°47′13.2″N 8°20′42″E

Geography
- Location within Hesse
- Location: Hesse, Germany
- Parent range: Gladenbach Uplands

Eschenburg (also written Eschenberg on some maps) is a hill in Hesse, Germany. It is located in the borough of Dillenburg, near the villages of Nanzenbach and Wissenbach. With an elevation of 589 metres, it is the town's highest point.

The hill gave its name to the municipality of Eschenburg.
