= Dietzhölztal =

- Municipality
- Coat of arms

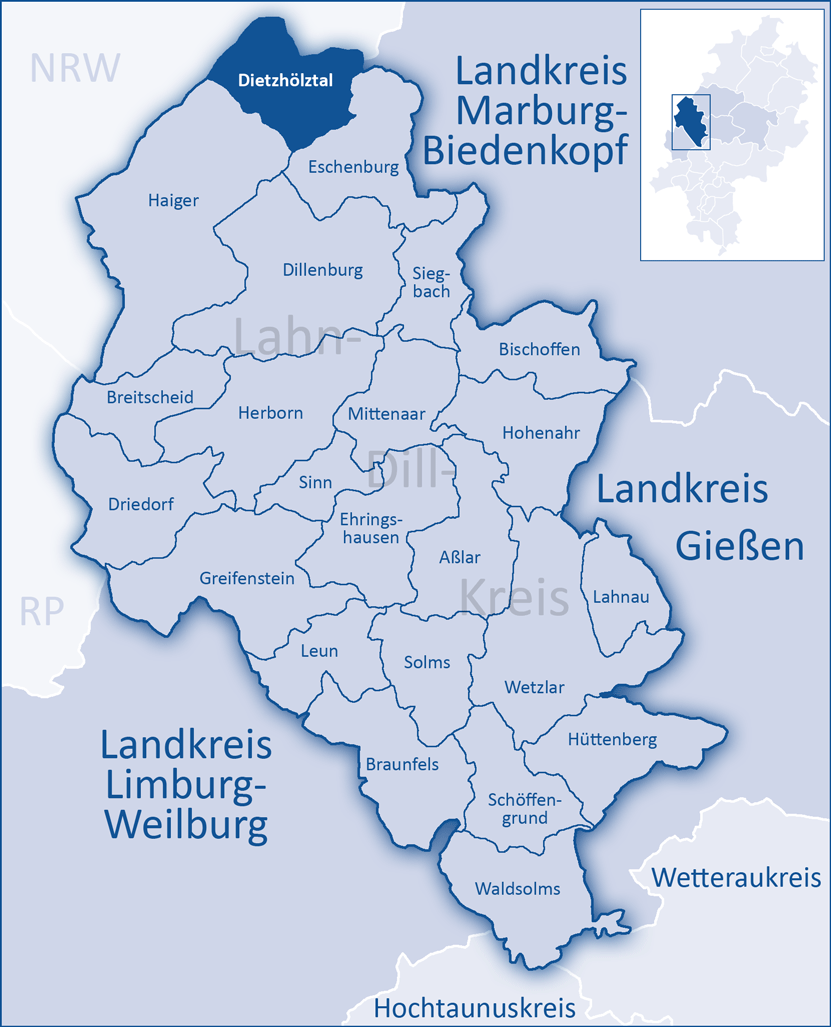
- Location of Dietzhölztal within Lahn-Dill-Kreis district
- Interactive map of Dietzhölztal
- Location within Germany Location within Hesse
- Coordinates: 50°50′N 08°19′E
- Country: Germany
- State: Hesse
- Admin. region: Gießen
- District: Lahn-Dill-Kreis
- Subdivisions: 4 Ortsteile

Government
  - Mayor (2019–25): Andreas Thomas (Ind.)

Area
  - Total: 37.47 km^{2} (14.47 sq mi)
- Elevation: 372 m (1,220 ft)

Population (2025-12-31)
  - Total: 5,251
  - Density: 140.1/km^{2} (363.0/sq mi)
- Time zone: UTC+01:00 (CET)
  - Summer (DST): UTC+02:00 (CEST)
- Postal codes: 35716
- Dialling codes: 02774
- Vehicle registration: LDK
- Website: www.dietzhoelztal.de

The municipality of Dietzhölztal (German pronunciation: [ˈdiːtshœltsˌtaːl], lit. 'Dietzhölze Valley') is the northernmost municipality in the Lahn-Dill-Kreis in Hesse, Germany.

== Geography ==
The community is located in a valley of the same name, only a few kilometres east of the border with North Rhine-Westphalia.

Rittershausen has 952 inhabitants, representing 14.2% of Dietzhölztal's population (as of 31 December 2005), making it the constituent community with the smallest population, but with a rural area of 1 847 ha (Dietzhölztal: 3 744 ha), that is, 49.3%, Rittershausen is almost as big as the three other communities of Ewersbach, Mandeln and Steinbrücken put together. The reason for this relates to what happened in the Late Middle Ages (see History below).

=== Neighbouring communities ===
Dietzhölztal borders in the northwest on the town of Netphen, in the north on the town of Bad Laasphe (both in Siegen-Wittgenstein district in North Rhine-Westphalia), in the east on the community of Breidenbach (Marburg-Biedenkopf), in the southeast on the community of Eschenburg, and in the southwest on the town of Haiger (both in the Lahn-Dill-Kreis).

=== Constituent communities ===
The community consists of the following centres:

- Ewersbach
- Mandeln
- Rittershausen
- Steinbrücken

== History ==
In the Middle Ages, the upper Dietzhölze Valley (German: Dietzhölztal – the community's namesake), owing to its great number of trees, was an important centre for metal production. The ores were mined in the Dillenburg area and smelted in furnaces in the Dietzhölze Valley. Thus the "Hammerweiher" was dammed up at Steinbrücken. Even today, a few metalworking companies are still represented in the Dietzhölze Valley, among them Kreck Metallwarenfabrik GmbH in Rittershausen.

=== Ewersbach ===
As of 1 January 2004, Ewersbach had 3,329 inhabitants. It was first documented mention under the name Ebirspach in 1302. Ewersbach itself was an amalgamation of three former villages, Bergebersbach, Straßebersbach, and Neuhütte. The last-named former village's name means "new foundry", reflecting the area's traditional industry.

=== Mandeln ===
Mandeln, with 1200 years of history behind it, is one of the district's oldest villages. It had its first documentary mention on 13 July 800 according to the Lorsch Codex (Bayerisches Hauptstaatsarchiv, HL Mainz 19, folg. 210 v. [12th century]). A landlord named Lager and his wife Duda donated to the Nazarius Monastery at Lorsch (near Heppenheim) under Richbodo's abbacy three farmyards, as many subsistence farms and five bound farmers in Mauventelina (Mandeln) in the Perfgau, whose political and ecclesiastical centre was Breidenbach.

This old village, under the name Moyndille, lasted until at least 1298, but the village's downfall eventually came, presumably as a result of a dispute between the Landgraves of Hesse and the Counts of Nassau, putting the date of the destruction sometime between 1433 and 1443. The village lay waste, though, for hardly any longer than half a century, for in 1489, about a kilometre south of where the old village had stood, came the refounding of Mandeln by the widow von Hutzmanns Heinz with her son Henn, and Gerlach, a certain Mr. Palmenie's son-in-law from Roth in Hesse.

The population grew steadily, with the odd slight swing, between 1489 and 2005. The greatest change, and the only major one in a short time, came in 1597 when the population fell from about 100 to about 20 owing to the Plague. A greater than average rise in population was seen in the 1970s due to the eviction of the weekend cottage area of Ebachseite and the arrival of guest workers' families. An upswing also came with German Reunification and the inflow of ethnic Germans from the former Soviet Union. In 2004, there were 1430 people living in Mandeln in 450 houses.

=== Rittershausen ===
For Rittershausen's age, one must look at historical evidence stretching across the whole time period from the 8th to 13th centuries. The old form of the name, Rudershusz, the favoured location in the Dietzhölze Valley, and the village's persistence even during the period of abandonments (due to an agrarian depression) in the Late Middle Ages all suggest that Rittershausen was founded in the 9th century, or at the latest, the 10th.

There were, however, people living in the area much longer ago. About 1912, the Reverend Karl Nebe, with sponsorship from councillor of commerce and local landowner Gustav Jung, and under the leadership of the State Museum in Wiesbaden, carried out a number of digs around the Ley (≈ cliff or crag). Ceramic objects, tools and jewellery were unearthed from what turned out to be a ringwall, as these structures are known, from Celtic times, between 450 and 250 BC, in the time of the La Tène culture.

Rittershausen's first documentary mention came in 1344 when the Mann- und Zinsbuch der Herren von Bicken ("Man and Interest Book of the Lords of Bicken") mentioned that in Ruderszhausen disz seyt der Bach (ie "this side of the brook"), the Lords were entitled to Groß- und Kleinzehnt (great and small tithes).

Within the fields attached to Rittershausen once lay the villages of Langenbach, Dunnenbach, Hilgeshausen, and possibly also Kirsebach. Nobody quite knows when these places were abandoned, but according to the aforesaid Reverend Karl Nebe, who was reporting local oral history, Langenbach was destroyed by the Plague, and the last few survivors moved to Rittershausen. Langenbach is mentioned in a list of nobles from about 1400, but in the record of the sale of the court district of Ewersbach by the Lords of Bicken to the Counts of Nassau, Langenbach is not mentioned, and there has been no further mention of it. To this day, there is a field called Dorfwiese – "Village Meadow" – even though the village disappeared centuries ago. These former villages' rural areas are now attached to Rittershausen.

== Municipal area development ==
=== Amalgamations ===
- 1971 Steinbrücken and Ewersbach
- 1972 Mandeln
- 1977 Rittershausen

=== Population development ===
- 1971 3,964
- 1972 5,039
- 1977 6,079
- 2002 6,909
- 2003 6,873
- 2005 6,693

== Institutions ==
Aside from the Evangelical and Catholic church parishes, the Theological Seminary and the Allianz-Mission (Evangelical missionary society), part of the Bund Freier evangelischer Gemeinden in Deutschland (League of Free Evangelical Communities in Germany) have their head offices in Ewersbach. Moreover, there are many clubs.

== Personalities ==
=== Sons and daughters of the town ===
- Steffen Schmitt, football pro

== Town partnership ==
Ishibashi, Japan
