= Biebertal =

- Municipality
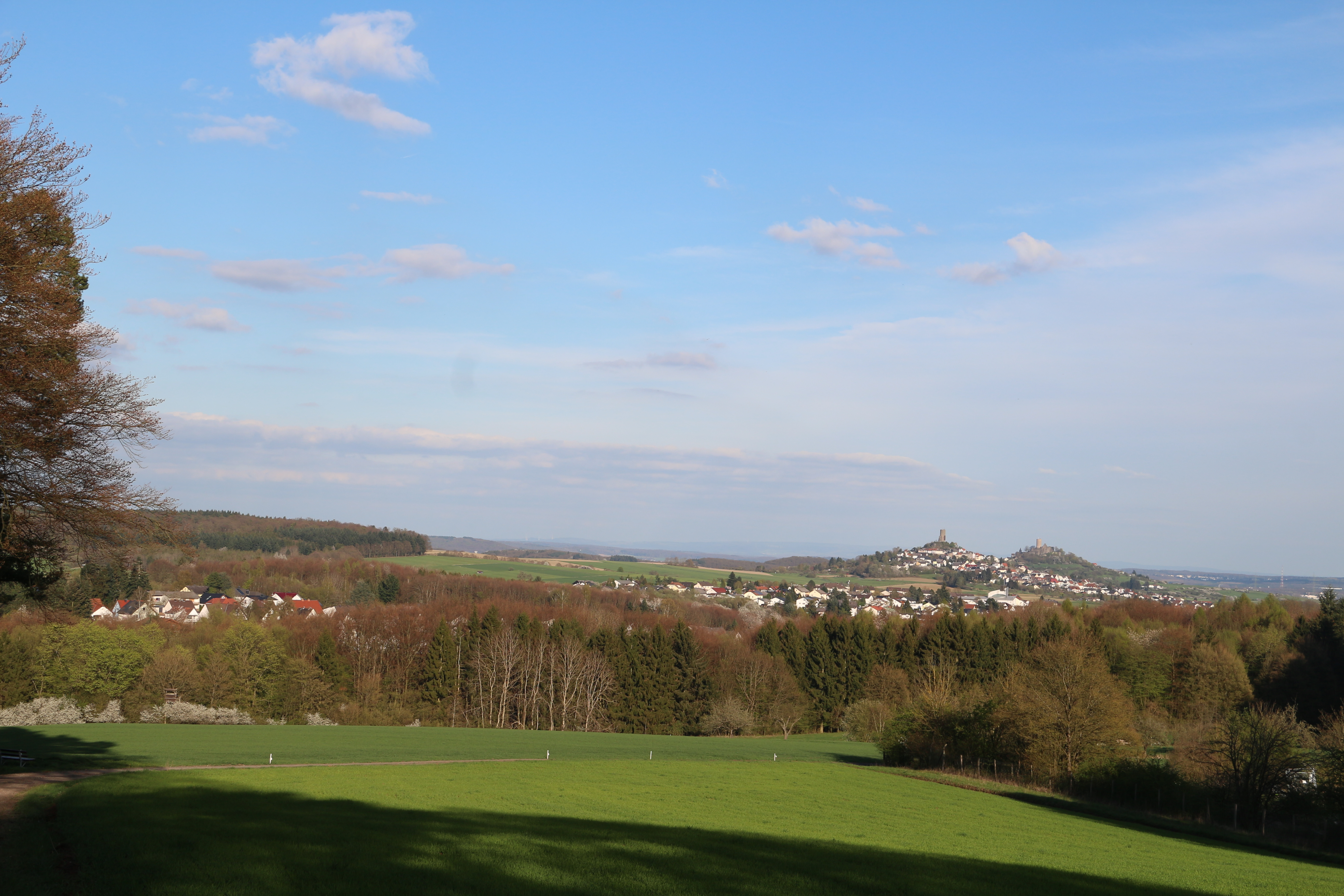

- Coat of arms

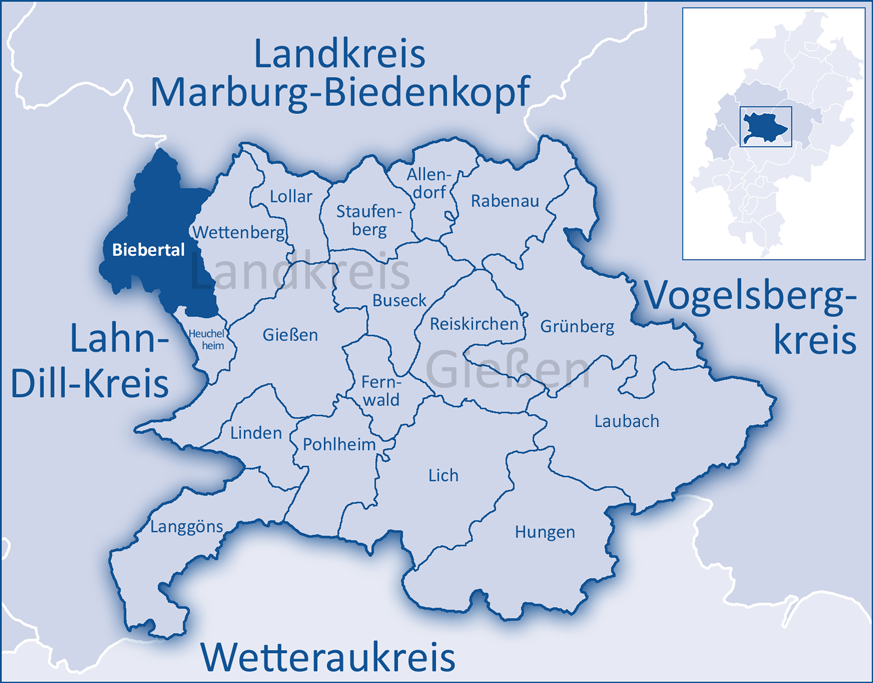
- Location of Biebertal within Gießen district
- Interactive map of Biebertal
- Location within Germany Location within Hesse
- Coordinates: 50°36′N 08°35′E
- Country: Germany
- State: Hesse
- Admin. region: Gießen
- District: Gießen

Government
  - Mayor (2017–23): Patricia Ortmann (Ind.)

Area
  - Total: 43.94 km^{2} (16.97 sq mi)
- Elevation: 194 m (636 ft)

Population (2025-12-31)
  - Total: 9,842
  - Density: 224.0/km^{2} (580.1/sq mi)
- Time zone: UTC+01:00 (CET)
  - Summer (DST): UTC+02:00 (CEST)
- Postal codes: 35444
- Dialling codes: 06409, 06446
- Vehicle registration: GI
- Website: www.biebertal.de

Biebertal (German pronunciation: [ˈbiːbɐtaːl]) is a municipality in the district of Gießen, in Hesse, Germany. It is situated 7 km northwest of Gießen.
