= Langgöns =

- Municipality
- Coat of arms

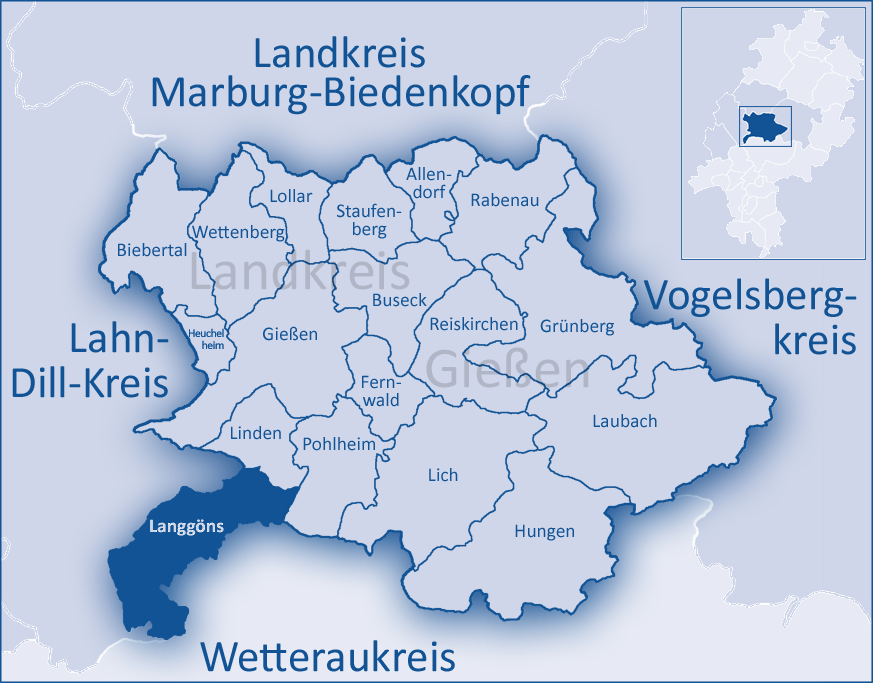
- Location of Langgöns within Gießen district
- Interactive map of Langgöns
- Location within Germany Location within Hesse
- Coordinates: 50°30′N 08°40′E
- Country: Germany
- State: Hesse
- Admin. region: Gießen
- District: Gießen

Government
  - Mayor (2018–24): Marius Reusch (CDU)

Area
  - Total: 52.53 km^{2} (20.28 sq mi)
- Elevation: 222 m (728 ft)

Population (2025-12-31)
  - Total: 11,018
  - Density: 209.7/km^{2} (543.2/sq mi)
- Time zone: UTC+01:00 (CET)
  - Summer (DST): UTC+02:00 (CEST)
- Postal codes: 35428
- Dialling codes: 06403 / 06447 / 06085
- Vehicle registration: GI
- Website: www.langgoens.de

Langgöns (German pronunciation: [ˈlaŋɡœns]) is a municipality in the district of Gießen, in Hesse, Germany. It is situated 10 km south of Gießen.

Due to the town's convenient proximity to several former U.S. military bases; Ayers Kaserne, Giessen Army Depot, and Ray Barracks, the town was formerly home to community of several hundred Americans, primarily U.S. military and civilian personnel and their families.

== Points of interest ==
- Roman Limes Germanicus: A portion of the ancient Limes wall can still be found in the forest approximately 1 km to the southwest of the village near the A45. The ruins of the wall parallel a logging road heading north–south, extending southwards through the town of Butzbach, and continuing southeast towards the Taunus mountains and the ancient Roman fort of Saalburg.
- Motocross: One of the largest motocross racing tracks in Hesse is located approximately 2 km southwest of the town directly off of the L3133 and behind the former U.S. military base of Ayers Kaserne.
