= Giessen (district) =

Coordinates: 50°35′N 8°45′E

Gießen
- District
- Flag Coat of arms
- Country: Germany
- State: Hesse
- Adm. region: Giessen
- Capital: Giessen

Government
  - District admin.: Anita Schneider (SPD)

Area
  - Total: 854.66 km^{2} (329.99 sq mi)

Population (31 December 2022)
  - Total: 278,664
  - Density: 330/km^{2} (840/sq mi)
- Time zone: UTC+01:00 (CET)
  - Summer (DST): UTC+02:00 (CEST)
- Vehicle registration: GI
- Website: https://www.lkgi.de

Giessen (Landkreis Giessen in German) (German pronunciation: [ˈɡiːsən]) is a Kreis (district) in the middle of Hessen, Germany. Neighboring districts are Marburg-Biedenkopf, Vogelsbergkreis, Wetteraukreis, and Lahn-Dill.

== History ==
In 1821 the Grand Duchy of Hesse created districts (called Landratsbezirke) in the reorganisation of its internal administration. In the area of today's district the districts of Giessen and Grünberg were created. 1822 another district called Hungen was created. In 1832 these entities were replaced with bigger structures, now called Kreis. There were still two districts, Giessen und Grünberg. 1837 several municipalities moved from Grünberg to Giessen, and Grünberg in exchange acquired some municipalities from Hungen, which became a district again in 1841.

After the revolutionary uprisings of 1848, the districts were dissolved and replaced with a Regierungsbezirk Giessen, but just four years later, the districts were recreated. After the war of 1866, the north-western part of the district became part of Prussia. In 1874, the district grew in size again.

In 1938, the city of Giessen was excluded from the district, and with the dissolution of the district Schotten, several municipalities joined the district.

After two minor changes in 1967 and 1971, in 1977, the district was merged with the districts Wetzlar and Dillkreis to form the new Lahn-Dill-Kreis. In 1979, it was split again, and the district Giessen was recreated. The city Giessen—temporarily merged with Wetzlar to the city Lahn—was included into the district.

== Geography ==
The main river of the district is the Lahn, which crosses the district from north to south.

== Coat of arms ==
The coat of arms shows a wooden triangle in the top, depicting the traditional house style. In the bottom there is the symbol of the Saint Antonius order, which founded a monastery in Grünberg in 1242, and also supported the foundation of the university on Giessen in 1607.

== Towns and municipalities ==
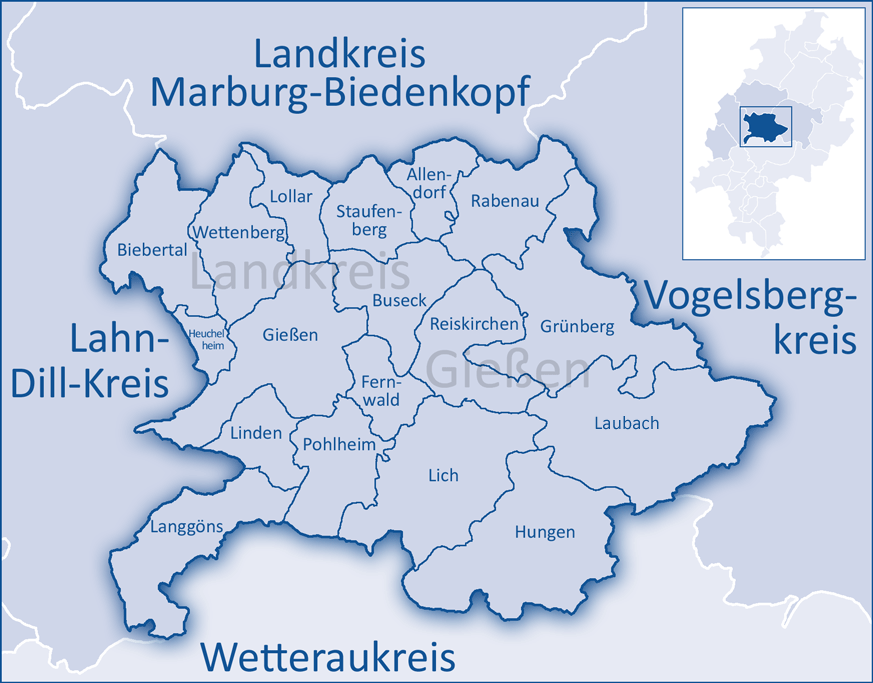
Clickable map of towns and municipalities in the district

Towns
1. Allendorf (Lumda)
2. Giessen
3. Grünberg
4. Hungen
5. Laubach
6. Lich
7. Linden
8. Lollar
9. Pohlheim
10. Staufenberg
Municipalities
1. Biebertal
2. Buseck
3. Fernwald
4. Heuchelheim
5. Langgöns
6. Rabenau
7. Reiskirchen
8. Wettenberg
