= Giessen (region) =

Coordinates: 50°40′N 8°40′E

Giessen Gießen (German)
- Regierungsbezirk
- Map of Hesse highlighting Giessen
- Country: Germany
- State: Hesse
- Region seat: Giessen

Government
  - District President: Christoph Ullrich (CDU)

Area
  - Total: 5,381.14 km^{2} (2,077.67 sq mi)

Population (31 December 2025)
  - Total: 1,037,191
  - Density: 192.746/km^{2} (499.209/sq mi)

GDP
  - Total: €46.317 billion (2024)
  - Per capita: €44,536 (2024)
- Website: www.rp-giessen.hessen.de

Giessen (Gießen in German) [ˈɡiːsən] is one of the three Regierungsbezirke of Hesse, Germany, located in the middle of the state. It was created on 1 January 1981 from the districts (Kreise) of Giessen, Lahn-Dill and Limburg-Weilburg and the Vogelsbergkreis, all formerly belonging to Darmstadt, and Marburg-Biedenkopf, formerly belonging to Kassel.

Kreise
(districts)
1. Giessen
2. Lahn-Dill-Kreis
3. Limburg-Weilburg
4. Marburg-Biedenkopf
5. Vogelsbergkreis

== Economy ==
The Gross domestic product (GDP) of the region was €35.9 billion in 2018, accounting for 1.1% of German economic output. GDP per capita adjusted for purchasing power was €47,800 or 105% of the EU27 average in the same year. The GDP per employee was 96% of the EU average.
