= Hessian Hinterland =

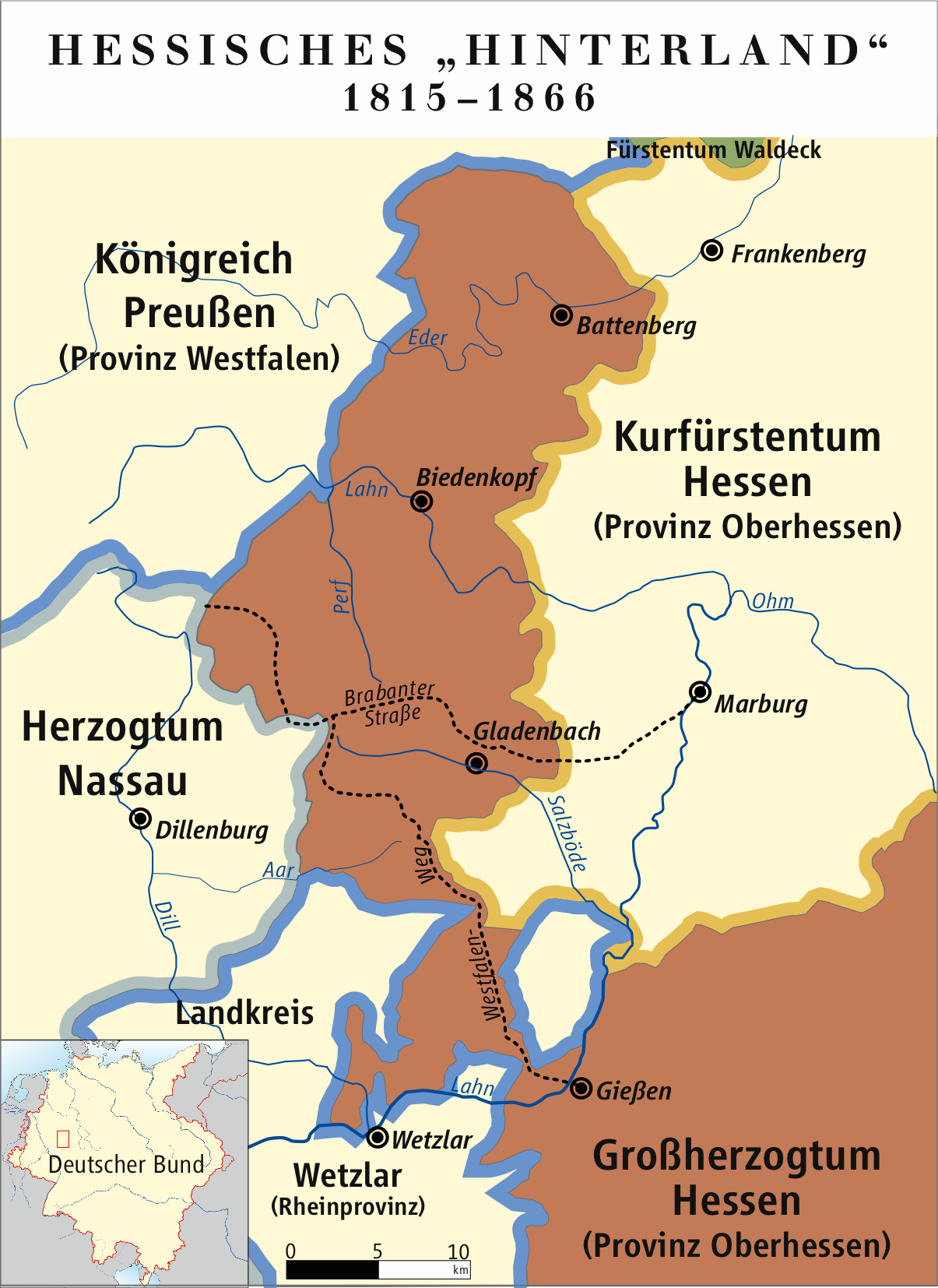
The Hessian Hinterland (without the exclave of Vöhl and Itter) 1815–1866

The land known as the Hessian Hinterland (German: Hessisches Hinterland) lies within the region of Middle Hesse and is concentrated around the old district of Biedenkopf, that is the western part of the present district of Marburg-Biedenkopf, as well as elements of the present-day districts of Lahn-Dill-Kreis and Waldeck-Frankenberg. Formerly it snaked its way from Bromskirchen in the north to Rodheim (near Gießen), in the municipality of Biebertal.

The Hinterland was originally territory belonging to Hesse-Darmstadt (later the Grand Duchy of Hesse), from which it was almost completely isolated, forming a long salient of the Upper Hesse province (which was itself separated from Darmstadt). Its origins lie in the 1568 partition of the Landgraviate of Hesse which established Hesse-Darmstadt, along with Hesse-Kassel, Hesse-Marburg and Hesse-Rheinfels. It was managed by the Ämter of Blankenstein (Gladenbach) with the Breidenbacher Grund, Biedenkopf and Battenberg. In 1832 the area was united into the Biedenkopf district, along with three exclaves around Waldeck (which were detached in 1852 as the separate Vöhl district); from then on the description became synonymous with district of Biedenkopf (now referred to as Altkreis Biedenkopf – old district of Beidenkopf – since its dissolution in 1974).

In 1866, following the Austro-Prussian War, Hesse was forced to cede the Hinterland to Prussia in the Peace Treaty of 3 September 1866, and the Biedenkopf district was incorporated into the new Province of Hesse-Nassau, Regierungsbezirk Wiesbaden. In 1932 the Biedenkopf district was reduced in size, losing its northern parts to Frankenberg and its southern parts to Wetzlar, thereby dividing the region. The three districts remained part of Hesse-Nassau until its partition in 1944 (becoming the provinces of Kurhessen and Nassau); after World War II they became part of Greater Hesse in 1945, then the modern State of Hesse in 1946.

Today the term is used locally for those parts of the old district of Biedenkopf that were absorbed into the Marburg-Biedenkopf. The Hinterland Intercommunal Cooperative (Interkommunale Zusammenarbeit Hinterland), a special purpose association set up in 2006, has given the name for this small region a public institutional significance again.

In the Hinterland a dialect of Low German known as Hinterländer Platt is spoken – albeit by fewer and fewer people, mostly just its older, local inhabitants.

== Administrative units today ==
The following towns and villages (arranged from north to south) are part of Hinterland:

- Waldeck-Frankenberg: Bromskirchen, Allendorf (Eder), Battenberg (Eder), Hatzfeld (Eder), Vöhl
- Marburg-Biedenkopf: Biedenkopf, Breidenbach, Dautphetal, Steffenberg, Angelburg, Bad Endbach, Gladenbach (apart from Weitershausen)
- Lahn-Dill-Kreis: Simmersbach and Roth, today in the municipality of Eschenburg, Bischoffen all villages, the quarter of Waldgirmes in the town of Lahnau and the quarters of Naunheim and Hermannstein in Wetzlar.
- Gießen: Biebertal less Vetzberg

== Literature ==
- Elsa Blöcher: Das Hinterland. Ein Heimatbuch. Stephani, Biedenkopf, 1981.
- Elsa Blöcher, Hinterländer Geschichtsverein (ed.): Beiträge zur Geschichte des Hinterlandes. Biedenkopf, 1985.
- Hans Friebertshäuser: Mundart und Volksleben im Altkreis Biedenkopf. Volksbank und Raiffeisenbank, Biedenkopf-Gladenbach, 1998.
- Jens Friedhoff: Hessen contra Mainz, Burg- und Stadtgründungen als Instrument hessischer und mainzischer Territorialpolitik im Hinterland. Region und Geschichte, Festschrift zum 100-jährigen Bestehen des Hinterländer Geschichtsvereins e. V., Beiträge zur Geschichte des Hinterlandes, Vol. IX, Biedenkopf, 2008, ISBN 978-3-00-024569-5, pp. 108–132.
- Karl Huth, Kreisausschuß des Landkreises Biedenkopf (ed.): Wirtschafts- und Sozialgeschichte des Landkreises Biedenkopf 1800–1866. Wetzlar, 1962.
- Christoph Kaiser: Die Tracht als veränderliche Kleidung. Beschrieben anhand der Trachten des Hessischen Hinterlandes, insbesondere der Tracht des Untergerichts des Breidenbacher Grundes. Grin, Munich, 2008, ISBN 978-3-640-18857-4.
- Regina Klein: In der Zwischenzeit. Tiefenhermeneutische Fallstudien zur weiblichen Verortung im Modernisierungsprozess 1900–2000. Psychosozial-Verlag, Gießen, 2003, ISBN 3-89806-194-9 (Life story of three Hinterland women).
- Ulrich Lennarz: Die Territorialgeschichte des hessischen Hinterlandes. Elwert, Marburg, 1973, ISBN 3-7708-0491-0.
- Bernhard Martin, Kreisausschuß des Landkreises Biedenkopf (publ.): Alte Lieder aus dem Hinterland. Wetzlarer Verlagsdruckerei, Wetzlar ,1964 (Liederbuch).
- Kerstin Werner: Wandern zwischen zwei Welten – Die Geschichte der Hinterländer / Arbeitsmigration in der Wetterau. In: Michael Keller, Herfried Münkler (ed.): Die Wetterau. Sparkasse Wetterau, Friedberg, 1990, ISBN 3-924103-06-2.
- Hinterländer Geschichtsverein e. V. (Hrsg.): Lebensbilder aus dem Hinterland, Geschichte, Landschaft und Dialekt als Bedingungsfaktoren für Existenz und Lebensformen im Hinterland (= Beiträge zur Geschichte des Hinterlandes. Vol. V). Biedenkopf, 1996.
- Karl Scheld: Wider das Vergessen. Kempkes, Gladenbach, 2005, ISBN 3-88343-039-0 (including details of the Aurora Works and iron smelting industry in the Hessian Hinterland).
- Hinterländer Geschichtsblätter, since 1907, ISSN 0018-196X.
