= Einloft =

Einloft is a family name of German origin. The family Einloft is original of Hesse, of the region known as "Hessisches Hinterland", around the municipalities of Gönnern (Angelburg), Dautphetal and Biedenkopf. The family held for generations the position of "Schulmeister zu Silberg" in the 18th and 19th centuries. A branch of this family settled on the Rhineland ca. 1800 and two brothers of the Rhineland branch migrated to Brazil in the 19th century. There has been immigration of the family Einloft to the United States as well.

== Bibliography ==
- (in Portuguese) Einloft Neto, Herculano de Lima. Genealogia da Família Einloft. http://sites.google.com/a/ig.com.br/einloft/home. (Archived by webcite/webcitation.org at ,,,,,,).
