= Eckelshausen =

Human settlement in Germany

Coordinates: 50°53′0″N 8°32′43″E

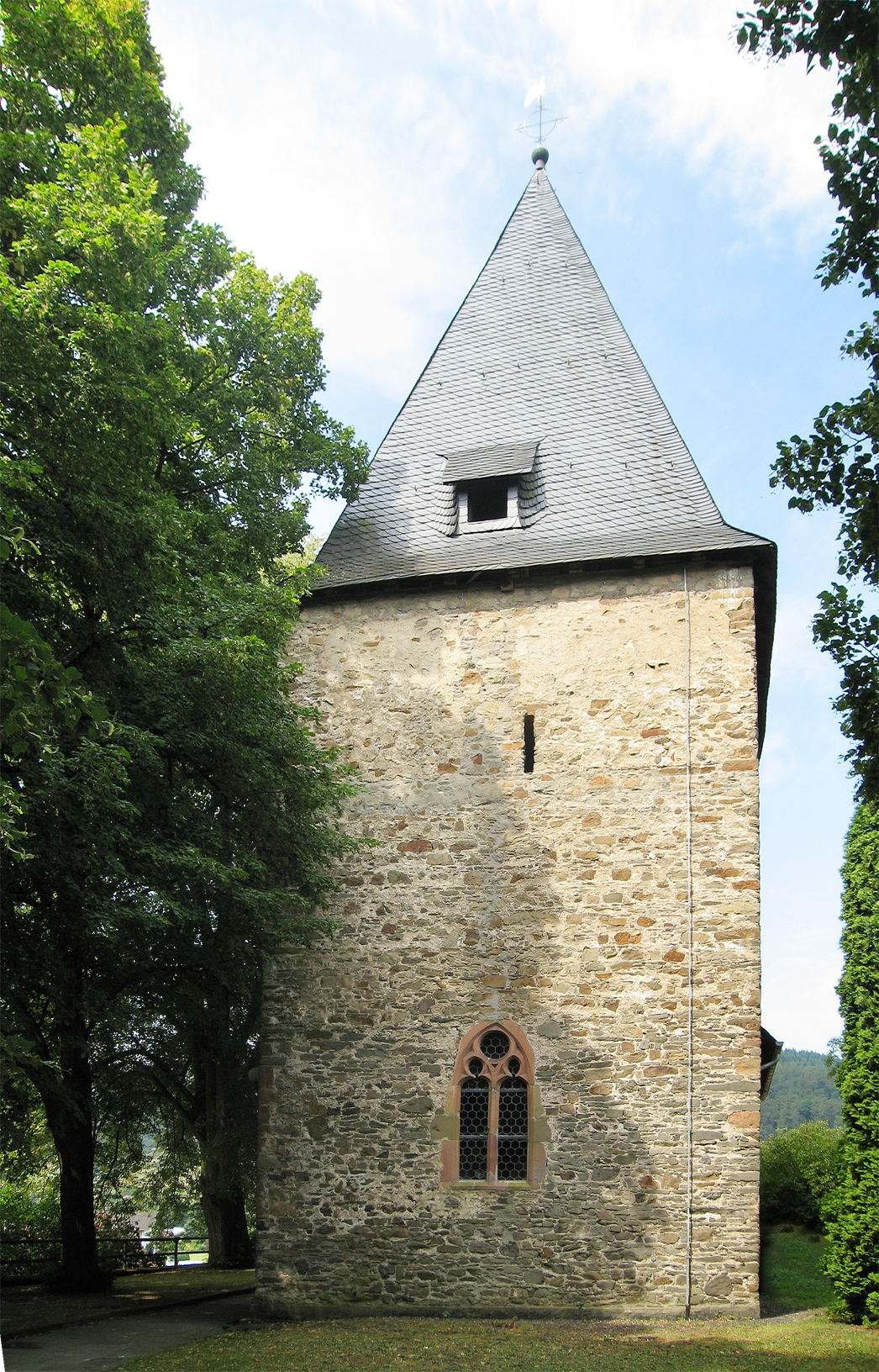
The Church at Eckelshausen

Eckelshausen is a village in the vicinity of Biedenkopf in Germany. It is part of the municipality Biedenkopf. As of 2011 it had a population of 759. It lies in the Lahn River valley, to the south of Biedenkopf and northwest of Kombach.

== Politics ==
As a local district, Eckelshausen has a local council consisting of five members, whose chairman is a local mayor. In the 2021 local elections in Hesse, voter turnout for the local council was 59.12%. The local council elected Siegfried Engelbach as local mayor.
