= Steffenberg =

- Municipality
- Coat of arms

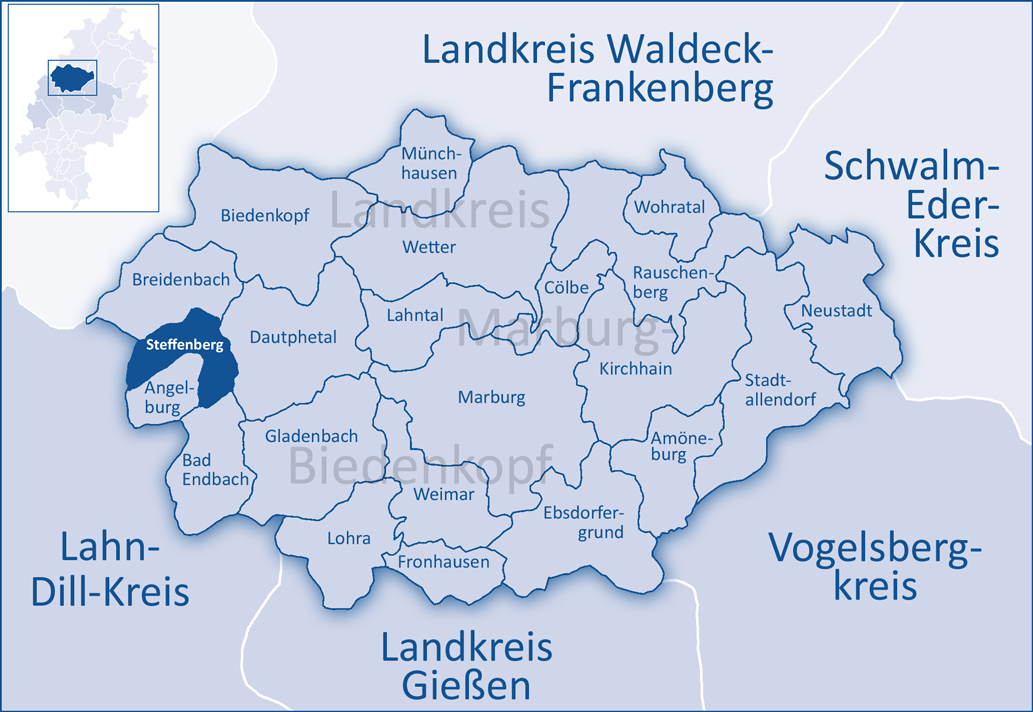
- Location of Steffenberg within Marburg-Biedenkopf district
- Interactive map of Steffenberg
- Location within Germany Location within Hesse
- Coordinates: 50°51′N 08°28′E
- Country: Germany
- State: Hesse
- Admin. region: Gießen
- District: Marburg-Biedenkopf

Government
  - Mayor (2022–28): Gernot Wege (Ind.)

Area
  - Total: 24.3 km^{2} (9.4 sq mi)
- Elevation: 330–550 m (1,080–1,800 ft)

Population (2025-12-31)
  - Total: 3,797
  - Density: 156/km^{2} (405/sq mi)
- Time zone: UTC+01:00 (CET)
  - Summer (DST): UTC+02:00 (CEST)
- Postal codes: 35239
- Dialling codes: 06464
- Vehicle registration: MR
- Website: www.steffenberg.de

Steffenberg (German pronunciation: [ˈʃtɛfn̩bɛʁk]) is a municipality in Marburg-Biedenkopf district in Hesse, Germany.

== Geography ==
=== Location ===
Steffenberg lies at the southern foothills of the Rothaargebirge between the towns of Dillenburg (20 km) and Marburg (35 km).

=== Neighbouring municipalities ===
Steffenberg borders in the north on the municipality of Breidenbach, in the east on the municipality of Dautphetal, in the south on the municipalities of Bad Endbach and Angelburg (all in Marburg-Biedenkopf), and in the west on the municipality of Eschenburg (Lahn-Dill-Kreis).

=== Divisions ===
The municipality consists of the following six centres:

- Niedereisenhausen
- Oberhörlen
- Quotshausen
- Steinperf
- Obereisenhausen
- Niederhörlen

== History ==
On 1 April 1972, the formerly independent municipalities of Niedereisenhausen, Obereisenhausen, Niederhörlen and Oberhörlen joined together of their own free will into the municipality of Steffenberg. On 1 July 1974, the municipalities of Steinperf and Quotshausen were amalgamated by state law with Steffenberg to form the current greater municipality.

== Politics ==
=== Gemeinderat ===
These are the results of the municipal election held on 26 March 2006:

Parties and voter coalitions		Share in %	Seats
CDU	Christian Democratic Union	22.2	5
SPD	Social Democratic Party of Germany	38.9	9
BLS	Bürgerliste Steffenberg (citizens' coalition)	38.9	9
total		100	23

=== Coat of arms ===
The civic coat of arms might be described thus: In Or a low fess wavy azure; above, a bear statant sable.

The arms are a visual representation of the river Perf, which flows through the municipality, and whose name means as much as "bear water".

=== Partnerships ===
- Lüsen, South Tyrol, Italy
- Környe, Hungary
