= Breidenbach =

- Municipality
- Coat of arms

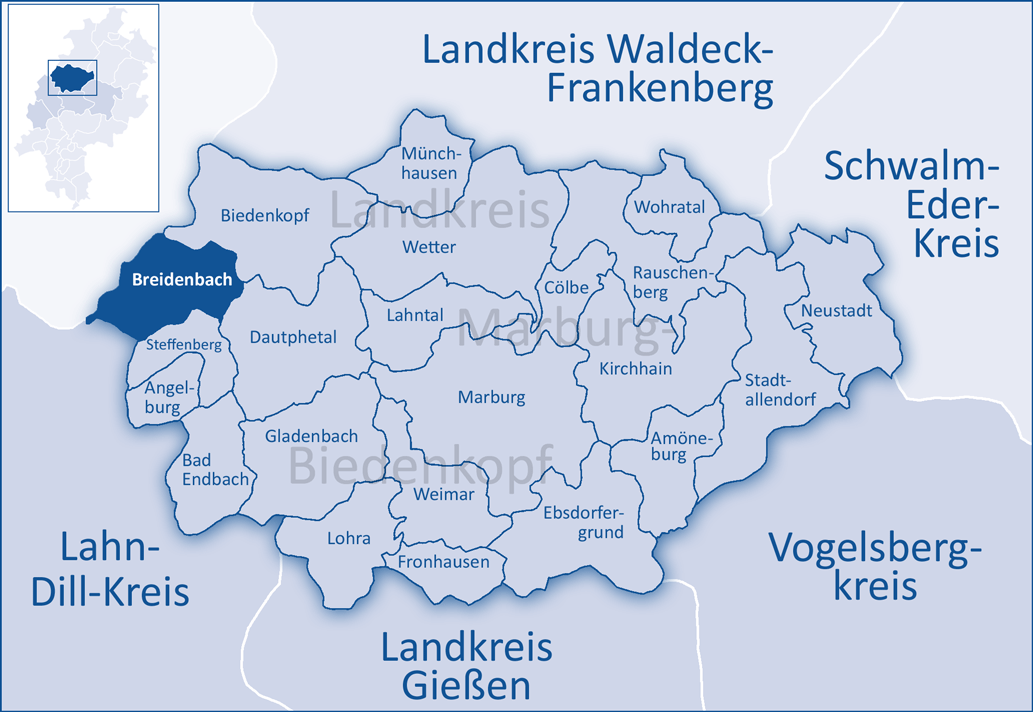
- Location of Breidenbach within Marburg-Biedenkopf district
- Interactive map of Breidenbach
- Location within Germany Location within Hesse
- Coordinates: 50°52′N 8°28′E
- Country: Germany
- State: Hesse
- Admin. region: Gießen
- District: Marburg-Biedenkopf
- Subdivisions: 7 Ortsteile

Government
  - Mayor (2018–24): Christoph Felkl (SPD)

Area
  - Total: 44.83 km^{2} (17.31 sq mi)
- Elevation: 320–561 m (1,050–1,841 ft)

Population (2025-12-31)
  - Total: 6,737
  - Density: 150.3/km^{2} (389.2/sq mi)
- Time zone: UTC+01:00 (CET)
  - Summer (DST): UTC+02:00 (CEST)
- Postal codes: 35236
- Dialling codes: 06465
- Vehicle registration: MR
- Website: www.breidenbach.de

Breidenbach (German pronunciation: [ˈbʁaɪdn̩bax]) is a municipality in the west of Marburg-Biedenkopf district in Hesse, Germany.

== Geography ==
=== Neighbouring municipalities ===
- Bad Laasphe
- Biedenkopf
- Dautphetal
- Eschenburg
- Steffenberg

=== municipality divisions ===
The municipality is divided into the Ortsteile (constituent municipalities) of Achenbach, Breidenbach, Kleingladenbach, Niederdieten, Oberdieten, Wiesenbach and Wolzhausen.

== Politics ==
=== Municipal council ===
As of municipal elections on March 6, 2016 and formerly on March 27, 2011, respective on March 26, 2006, municipal council seats are apportioned thus:

Parties and voting blocks		% 2016	Seats 2016	% 2011	Seats 2011	% 2006	Seats 2006
SPD	Social Democratic Party of Germany	35.8	10	43.5	12	41.0	11
CDU	Christian Democratic Union	33.2	9	35.2	9	40.1	11
BL	Bürgerliste (citizens' coalition)	31.0	8	21.4	6	18.9	5
Total		100	27	100	27	100	31
Turnout in %		42.6		46.3		43.3	

== Mayor ==
Christoph Felkl (SPD) was elected mayor on October 28, 2012 for a 6-year term beginning April 1, 2013. He was re-elected in 2018.

Werner Reitz (SPD) was formerly elected as mayor on October 22, 2000 with 59.7% of the votes.

== Constituent municipalities' coats of arms ==
Coat of arms	municipality's name
	Achenbach
	Breidenbach
	Kleingladenbach
	Niederdieten
	Oberdieten
	Wiesenbach
	Wolzhausen

== Sport ==
=== Sports facilities ===
Breidenbach has many sports facilities, including two playing fields in the main municipality. These are open free to the public. In Kleingladenbach there is also a skiing hill with a ski lift, for which the municipality is becoming attractive to tourists. The main municipality also offers two gymnasia, a small sports hall and the Perftalhalle.

== Economy and infrastructure ==
=== Shopping ===
The municipality of Breidenbach is a developed, industrial place. A number of shopping and leisure opportunities make Breidenbach the municipality's, and the surrounding area's, centre.

=== Industry ===
Furthermore, Breidenbach has at its disposal a large industrial area (Industriegebiet West) harbouring successful businesses such as Weber Maschinenbau and a Buderus disk brake manufacturing plant. The main municipality of Breidenbach thereby employs more than 2,500 workers.

== Transport ==
=== Public transportation ===
Breidenbach is well connected to the Rhein-Main-Verkehrsverbund public transport system. The following services come to the municipality:

- 491: Dillenburg - Niedereisenhausen - Biedenkopf (and back)
- MR-52: Biedenkopf - Friedensdorf - Niedereisenhausen - Biedenkopf (and the other way round)
- MR-55: Niedereisenhausen - Breidenbach-Wolzhausen - Friedensdorf

== Education ==
=== Schools ===
Breidenbach has the following schools:

Breidenbach:

- Grundschule
- Orientation year ("Förderstufe")
- Hauptschule

Oberdieten:

- Grundschule

Wolzhausen:

- Grundschule

=== Kindergarten ===
The municipality Breidenbach has the following Kindergarten:

- Breidenbach (2)
- Oberdieten

=== Breidenbach clubs and associations ===
- Frauenchor 1975 Breidenbach (women's choir)
- TV 09 Breidenbach
- Trachtentanzgruppe Breidenbach (costume dance group)
- Burschenschaft Breidenbach (fraternity)
- Mädchenschaft Breidenbach (sorority)
