= Angelburg =

- Municipality
- Coat of arms

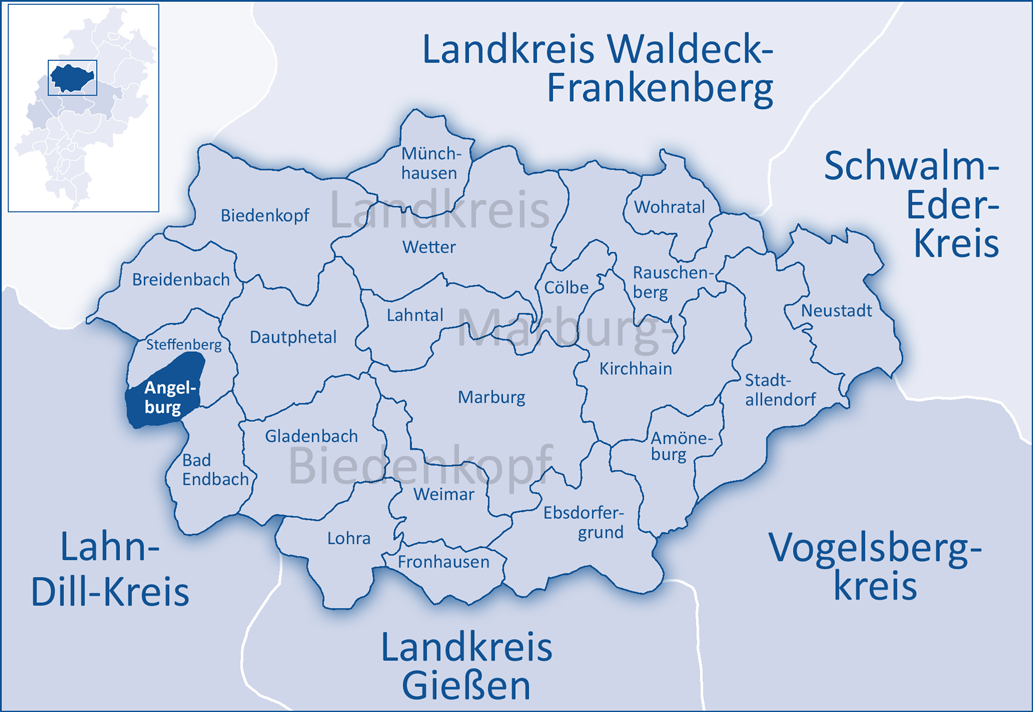
- Location of Angelburg within Marburg-Biedenkopf district
- Interactive map of Angelburg
- Location within Germany Location within Hesse
- Coordinates: 50°49′N 8°26′E
- Country: Germany
- State: Hesse
- Admin. region: Gießen
- District: Marburg-Biedenkopf

Government
  - Mayor (2017–23): Thomas Beck (SPD)

Area
  - Total: 16.73 km^{2} (6.46 sq mi)
- Elevation: 381 m (1,250 ft)

Population (2025-12-31)
  - Total: 3,392
  - Density: 202.7/km^{2} (525.1/sq mi)
- Time zone: UTC+01:00 (CET)
  - Summer (DST): UTC+02:00 (CEST)
- Postal codes: 35719
- Dialling codes: 06464
- Vehicle registration: MR
- Website: www.angelburg.de

Angelburg (German pronunciation: [ˈaŋl̩bʊʁk]) is a municipality in western Marburg-Biedenkopf in northwest Middle Hesse in Germany.

== Geography ==
=== Geographical location ===
The municipality is found about 12 km south of Biedenkopf in the Gansbach valley north of the Schelder Wald (forest), whose north end consists of the Angelburg Mountain (609 m above sea level) with its television transmitter.

=== Neighbouring municipalities ===
The municipality is bounded on the north and east by Steffenberg. Bad Endbach's municipal area borders with Angelburg's constituent municipality of Bottenhorn, likewise in the east. In the south, Angelburg's municipal area abuts Siegbach, and in the west Eschenburg, both in the Lahn-Dill district.

=== Municipal divisions ===
The municipality consists of the following places:

- Frechenhausen
- Gönnern
- Lixfeld

== History ==
The municipality of Angelburg began its life between 1972 and 1974 within the framework of Hessian municipal reform.

The municipality of Lixfeld has a history stretching back at least to the Middle Ages. It was mentioned in the Codex Eberhardi, a compilation by a monk in Fulda in the twelfth century, and the mention was attested to by a later document, dating from 1238. This was Lixfeld's first documentary mention.

At that time, the village was also known as Lixfeld, but it has undergone several name changes over the centuries, having been known as Lykisvelt or Litzfeld, but now once again Lixfeld.

Lixfeld was part of the Wittengestein landholdings. Digs on the Kirchberg have revealed that sometime in the 9th or 10th century, a castle with a tower was built in the glen overlooking the old road. Lixfeld was also one of the oldest seats of an early mediaeval court of law and enjoyed something of a heyday at that time. The local Imperial count moved into the castle and held court under a great linden tree with the local freemen. The castle's masters also forced merchants using the road down below to pay tolls. Charcoal works were set up in the forests, and in the dales, bloomeries and smithies were busy smelting and working iron.

In 1238, the court was made a Zent (≈soke) of the Battenberg Counts, who then sold it to the Archbishop's Estate of Mainz. As of 1246, the von Lixfelds and the Dörings owned the court as joint inheritors.

In 1321-23, the castle was remodelled for church purposes. A "pastor von Lykisuelt" was first mentioned in 1334 and a parish church in 1358. The church was under the Deaconate of Breidenbach and was under the patronage of the von Hohenfels and Döring families.

== Politics ==
The municipality is a member of the intercommunal Lahn-Dill-Bergland association.

=== Municipal council ===
After the municipal election on 6 March 2016, the council's seats were distributed thus:

- CDU: 7 seats
- SPD: 8 seats
- BGL/FWG (citizens' coalition): 8 seats

=== Coat of arms ===
The municipal arms might be described as party per fess, above in azure the Hessian lion striped argent and gules armed Or, langued gules, wearing a crown Or, below in argent three six-pointed stars gules.

The lion refers to the early Hessian lordliness, and the three stars stand for the three constituent municipalities within Angelburg.
