= Oberhessische Presse =

German newspaper in Hesse

- Type: Daily newspaper
- Format: Broadsheet
- Owner(s): Verlagsgesellschaft Madsack GmbH & Co. KG
- Publisher: Hitzeroth Druck + Medien GmbH & Co. KG
- Editor-in-chief: Dr. Wolfram Hitzeroth
- Editor: Christoph Linne
- Founded: 1 July 1951
- Language: German
- Headquarters: Oberhessische Presse, Franz-Tuczek-Weg 1, D-35039 Marburg
- Circulation: 24,569
- Website: www.op-marburg.de

The Oberhessische Presse is a regional, daily newspaper published by the Hitzeroth Druck + Medien GmbH & Co. KG for the district of Marburg-Biedenkopf in Hesse, Germany.

The newspaper was created in 1951 by the merger of the Oberhessische Zeitung and the Marburger Presse.
