= Bad Endbach =

- Municipality
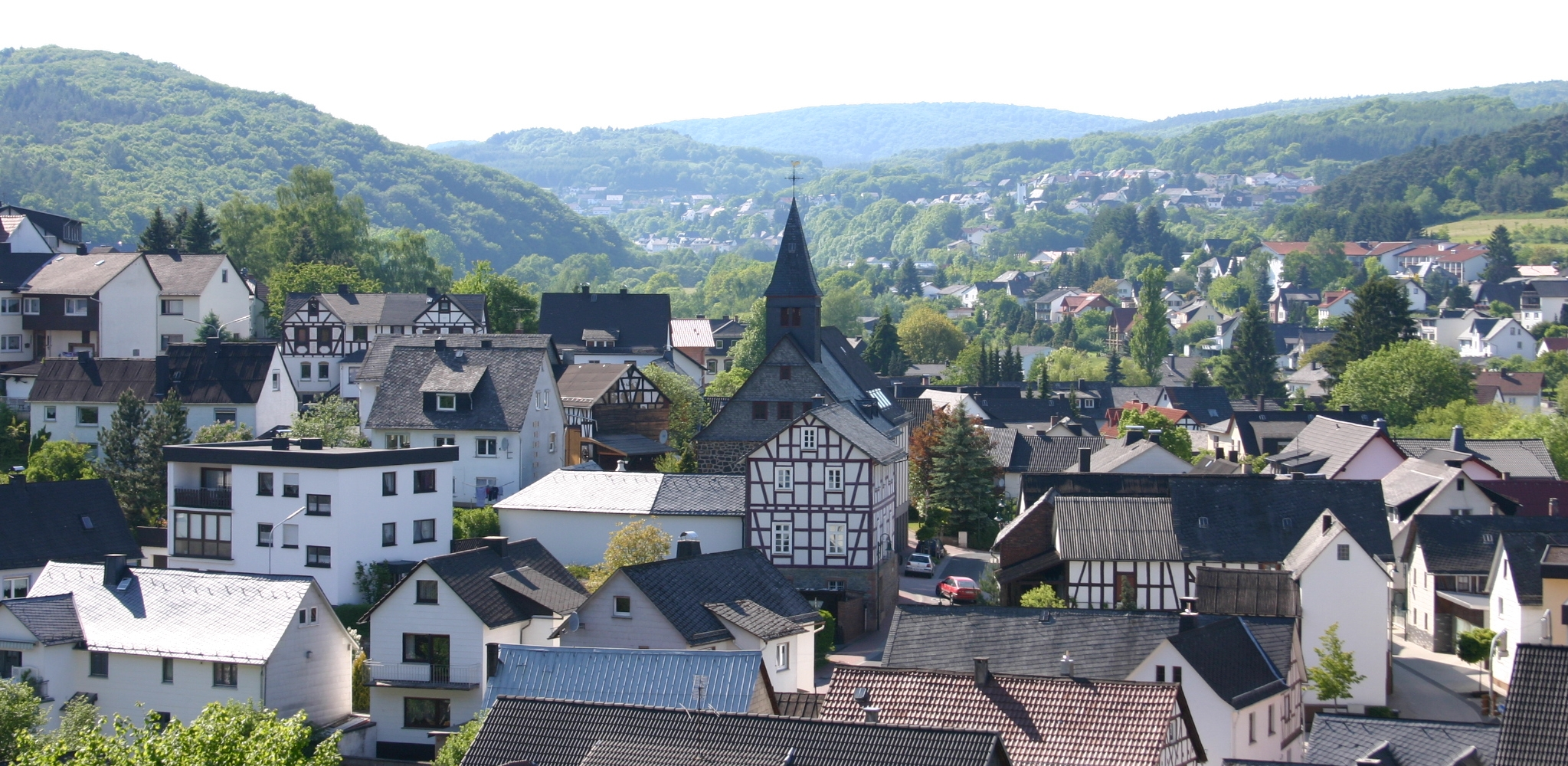
- View over Bad Endbach

- Coat of arms

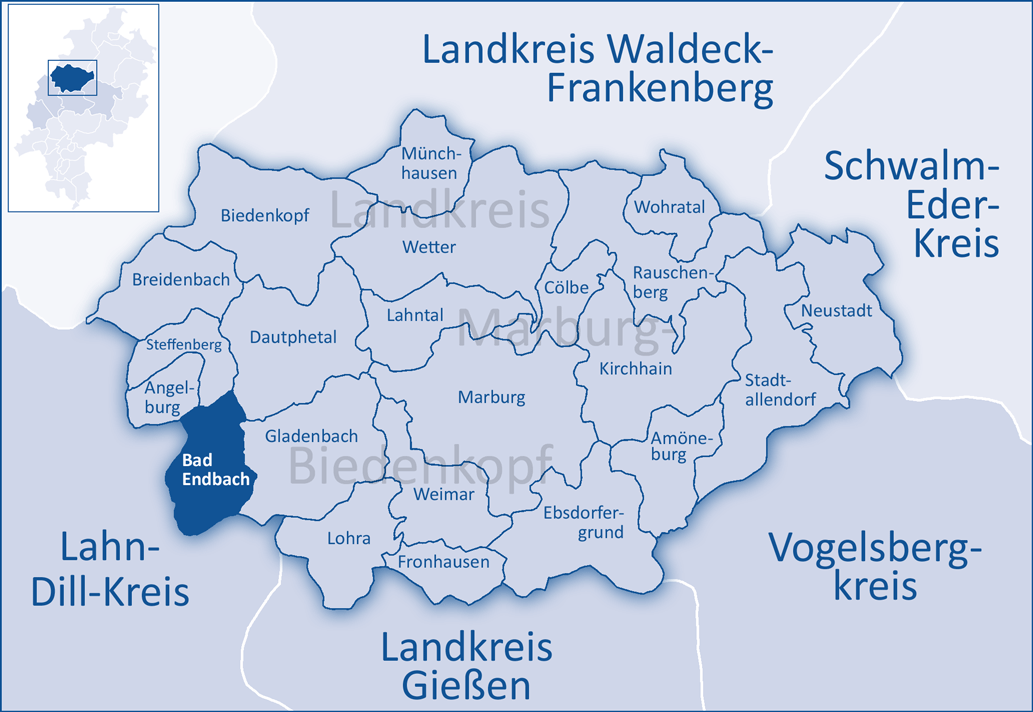
- Location of Bad Endbach within Marburg-Biedenkopf district
- Interactive map of Bad Endbach
- Location within Germany Location within Hesse
- Coordinates: 50°45′N 8°30′E
- Country: Germany
- State: Hesse
- Admin. region: Gießen
- District: Marburg-Biedenkopf
- Subdivisions: 8 Ortsteile

Government
  - Mayor (2023–29): Erika Weber (CDU)

Area
  - Total: 39.85 km^{2} (15.39 sq mi)
- Elevation: 300 m (980 ft)

Population (2025-12-31)
  - Total: 7,900
  - Density: 200/km^{2} (510/sq mi)
- Time zone: UTC+01:00 (CET)
  - Summer (DST): UTC+02:00 (CEST)
- Postal codes: 35080
- Dialling codes: 02776
- Vehicle registration: MR
- Website: www.bad-endbach.de

Bad Endbach (German pronunciation: [baːt ˈʔɛntbax]) is the westernmost municipality in Marburg-Biedenkopf district of the state of Hesse in Germany, and borders on the Lahn-Dill district.

== Geography ==
=== Location ===
Bad Endbach lies in the Lahn-Dill Bergland (ie Highland) in the foothills of the Rothaargebirge and Westerwald mountain ranges in a changeable low mountain range landscape between the towns of Marburg and Herborn.

Within the municipality's territory, in the Hartenrod area, rises the brook known as the Salzböde, along which stretches much of the municipal area.

=== Geology ===
Geologically, the area belongs mainly to the Devonian and Culm formation in which slate, greywacke and diabase predominate.

=== Neighbouring municipalities ===
Clockwise from the north, the following towns and municipalities border on the municipality of Bad Endbach:

The municipalities of Angelburg, Steffenberg and Dautphetal lie to the northwest, north and northeast respectively. Next, to the east, comes the town of Gladenbach. All these municipalities lie, like Bad Endbach itself, in Marburg-Biedenkopf district. Further, there is the municipality of Bischoffen in the south and the municipality of Siegbach in the west, both of which belong to the Lahn-Dill district.

=== municipality divisions ===
Bad Endbach's municipal area is divided into eight constituent municipalities.

municipality	Description
Bottenhorn	With about 1350 inhabitants it is the third biggest constituent municipality. Bottenhorn was first mentioned in 1302 in a document from the Altenberg Monastery. Historic names: 1304 Botinhorne, 1324 Buttinhorn, 1491 Bettehorn, 1502 Bottenhorn
Dernbach	Historic names: 1255 Derinbach, 1363 Therinbach, 1398 Derenbach, 1411 Dernbach.
Endbach	Main centre and second biggest constituent municipality lying at the forks where the Endebach empties into the Salzböde. Historic names: 1261 Endebach, 1577 Ennebach
Günterod	Historic names: 1294 Gunterode, 1343/47 Günterrode, 1416 Günterade, 1479 Gonterodde, 1502 Gunteroide, 1564 Günterode
Hartenrod	With 2504 inhabitants (1997) the biggest constituent municipality. Hartenrod was first mentioned in 1364. Historic names: 1364 Harterode, 1380 Harprachterode, 1397 Hartenrade, 15. Jhd. Hirtprachterode, 1466 Hartenrode, 1502 Harteroide, 1630 Hartenroda.
Hülshof	With about 20 inhabitants, living in five houses, the smallest constituent municipality. Der Hülshof was first mentioned in 1284. Historic names: 1284 Hulsbahc, 1304 Halespecher marca, 1304 Hulisbach, 1344 Hultzpach, 1354 Hulzbach, 1397 Holspach, 1630 Hulß Hoff
Schlierbach	About 420 inhabitants. Schlierbach was first mentioned in 1318 as Slirbach (Slir-Lehm). A brook of the same name flows through the little village. Historic names: 1318 Slirbach, 1359 Sclirbach, 1448 Slierbach, 1630 Schlirbach
Wommelshausen	About 950 inhabitants. Wommelshausen was first mentioned on 10 August 1336. Historic forms of the name: 1336, a double village called Womoldishusin superior et inferior (ie Upper and Lower Womoldishusin); 1340, Syvret von Womulshusen (a lay judge's name); undated, Wommeldishoffen; 1400, Waneboltshusen; 1500, Womelshusenn; 1536, Wumolzhusen; 1707, Womelshausen. Name comes from Frankish given name Womhold or Wombold, and therefore means "settlement at Wombold's house". The village is clearly older than the first mention, as the chapel (mentioned below) had already undergone remodelling in 1268. The municipality of Hütte also belongs to Wommelshausen. Once wholly confined to Wommelshausen's rural area, it has now also swallowed up 80% of Endbach's rural area, too. It was first mentioned in 1586 under the name "uf der Hütten", and later in 1703 as "Die Hütte". This municipality is not the same one as the former Unterwommelshausen. It is newer and can be traced back to an ironworks here in the late Middle Ages.

== History ==
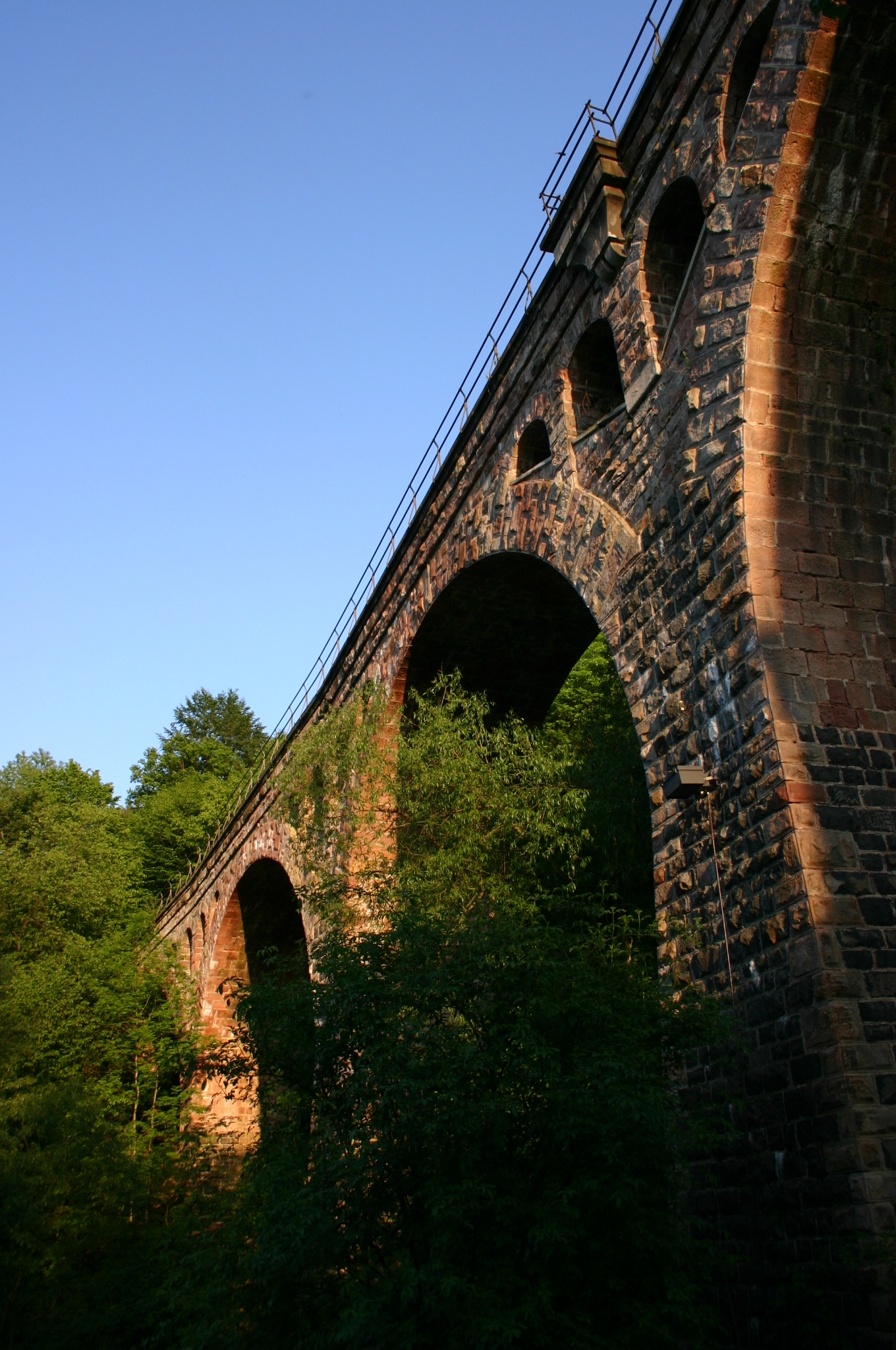
Viaduct on the Aar-Salzböde railway in Hartenrod

=== Amalgamations ===
On 1 February 1971, the two municipalities of Endbach and Wommelshausen combined into one municipality of Endbach, and likewise the two municipalities of Hartenrod and Schlierbach did the same on 31 December of the same year, taking the former's name. On 1 April 1972, Günterod was amalgamated with Endbach, before in the end, on 1 July 1974, as a result of municipal reform in Hesse, Endbach and Hartenrod were not only amalgamated with each other, but also with Bottenhorn, Dernbach and Hülshof to form the new municipality of Bad Endbach.

== Politics ==
=== Municipal council ===
As of municipal elections on 6 March 2016 and formerly on 27 March 2011, respective on 26 March 2006, municipal council seats are apportioned thus:

Parties and voting blocks		% 2016	Seats 2016	% 2011	Seats 2011	% 2006	Seats 2006
SPD	Social Democratic Party of Germany	42.6	10	37.8	9	35.5	11
CDU	Christian Democratic Union	36.3	8	40.1	10	36.0	11
FWG	Freiwillige Wählergemeinschaft (citizens' coalition)	21.1	5	18.3	5	22.5	7
UBL	Unabhängige Bürgerliste Bad Endbach (Independent citizens' list)			3.8	1	6.0	2
Total		100	23	100	25	100	31
Turnout in %		40.5		39.1		36.6	

=== Coat of arms ===
The municipal arms might be described thus: In vert six bendlets sinister wavy argent; above a sun Or; below a watering can Or.

=== Town partnerships ===
- Ambt Montfort, Netherlands

== Culture and sightseeing ==
In Wommelshausen stands a noteworthy old chapel of Romanesque origins that was apparently remodelled or renovated in the 13th century in the early Gothic style. It is said to be an important historic building as it has hardly changed over the ages. Timbers found in the demonstrably remodelled east gable come from the year 1268 (the year that they were felled). The building that stands today is, however, much older, likely by as much as 200 or 250 years. During renovation work, clues were found on the south side in the inner room to an earlier building. This earlier building might have been a wooden church on a stone foundation, and might have been built in the time of the Irish-Scottish mission in the area. Irish-Scottish missionaries were active in the vicinity even before Saint Boniface, as digs at the Büraburg Monastery prove (as do those at, among others, Wetter and the Christenberg). The building standing today might have been built under the influence of the Worms Bauhütte (a forerunner to the later guilds), as it bears a keen likeness to the rather bigger Magnus-Kirche (church) in Worms. The Bishopric of Worms once had vast holdings throughout the area.

Two small, high windows on the building's south side have round frames inside, but oddly squeezed, peaked frames on the outside, a sure sign of remodelling. The former priest's entrance in the south front wall is definitely Romanesque. The layman's entrance lies on the north side underneath the later enlarged window. In the west wall is found a further window. The chapel once had an oblong choir which was broken up and its opening walled up in the 18th century. Measurements of the building's inner dimensions yield a width of about 6.95 m and a length of about 10.15 m. The walls are about 1.2 m thick. The builders, however, used a "foot", believed to average about 33 cm long to do their measurements. The building stones were boulders, greywacke, on rich beds of mortar. There are no hewn stones. The inner room is a plain chamber. The building has a ridge turret as a bell tower. It never had a steeple like other churches in the area. These are the main things that set the building apart from others in the area. The inner room is further an example of one of the earliest galleries in the whole area.

The chapel is said to have once been built over a spring. Its location at the lowest place in the village lends weight to this story. It was supposedly a chapel to Saint Mary before the Reformation, and served as a pilgrimage site because of the spring, which was said to work wonders, and which was said to have come forth from under the choir. There is a pleasant anecdote about this.

=== Christian municipalities ===
Denomination	Centre
Evangelical Church	Bad Endbach / Bottenhorn / Günterod / Hartenrod / Wommelshausen
Free Evangelical municipality	Bad Endbach / Günterod / Hartenrod-Schlierbach / Wommelshausen
Catholic Church	Hartenrod
Ev. Gemeinschaft e.V. and Christian Endeavour Youth Association	Hartenrod
Christian Assembly ("Open Brethren")	Bad Endbach / Günterod
Christian Assembly ("Closed Brethren")	Dernbach / Günterod
Plymouth Brethren IV ("Exclusive Brethren")	Bad Endbach

=== Regular events ===
Easter hiking week, Whitsun hiking week, Health days, Music days, Autumn hiking week, Sinnlos youth evangelization .

== Economy and infrastructure ==
Bad Endbach earns its livelihood overridingly from its spa business and tourism. There are no big companies operating in the municipality.

=== Spas ===
Bad Endbach offers an extensive network of hiking trails, a choice of specialized offerings for migraine therapy and vein treatments as well as clinical aftercare.
