= Dautphetal =

- Municipality
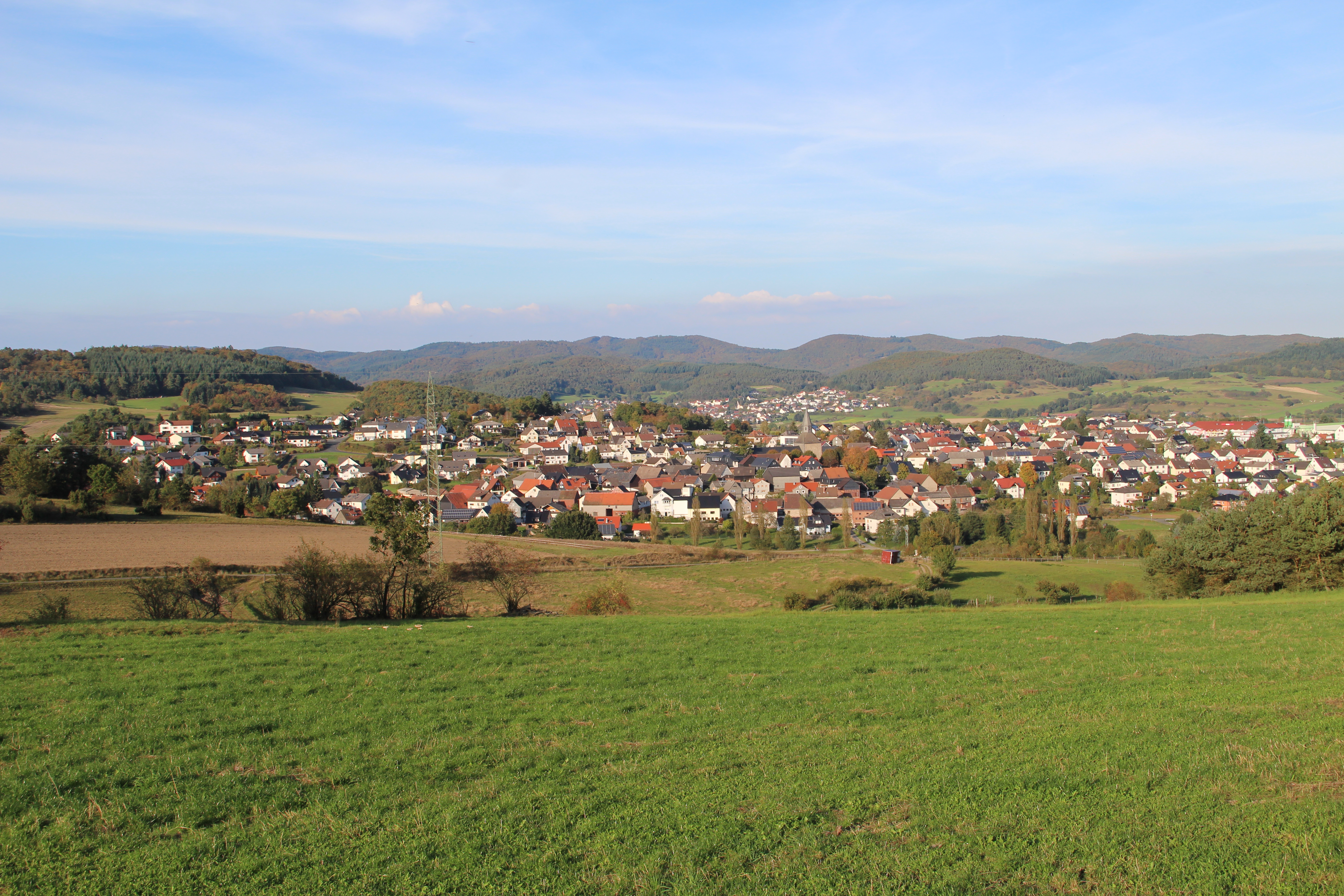
- The Ortsteile Dautphe of Dautphetal

- Coat of arms

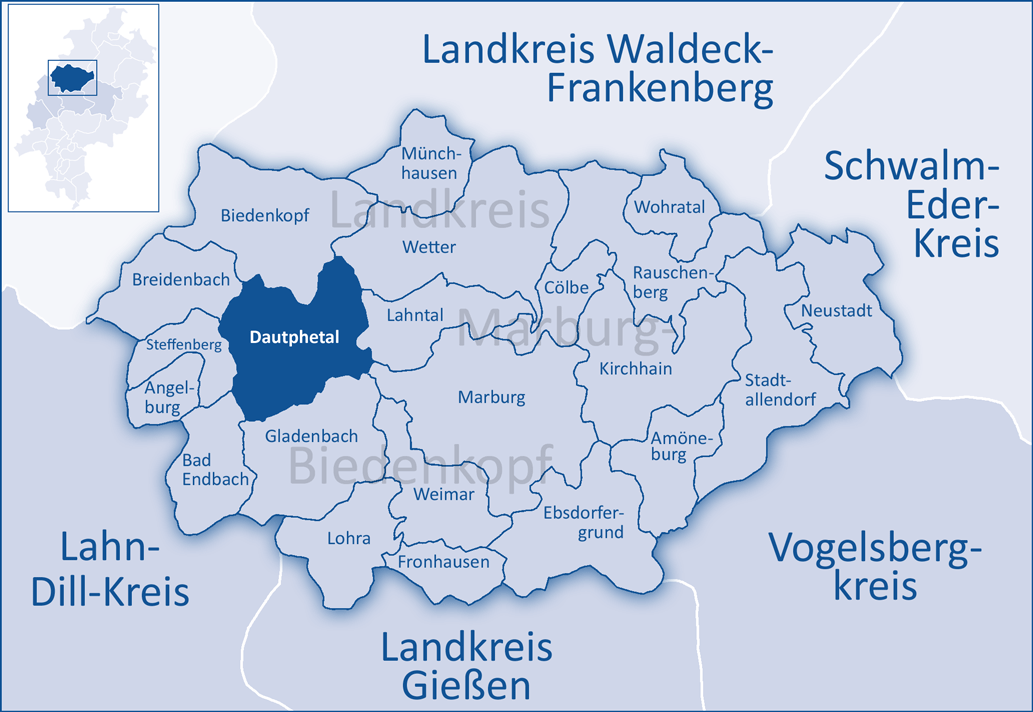
- Location of Dautphetal within Marburg-Biedenkopf district
- Interactive map of Dautphetal
- Location within Germany Location within Hesse
- Coordinates: 50°50′N 8°33′E
- Country: Germany
- State: Hesse
- Admin. region: Gießen
- District: Marburg-Biedenkopf
- Subdivisions: 12 Ortsteile

Government
  - Mayor (2022–28): Marco Schmidtke

Area
  - Total: 72.02 km^{2} (27.81 sq mi)
- Elevation: 220–533 m (722–1,749 ft)

Population (2025-12-31)
  - Total: 11,350
  - Density: 157.6/km^{2} (408.2/sq mi)
- Time zone: UTC+01:00 (CET)
  - Summer (DST): UTC+02:00 (CEST)
- Postal codes: 35232
- Dialling codes: 06466, 06468, 06420
- Vehicle registration: MR
- Website: www.dautphetal.de

Dautphetal (German pronunciation: [ˈdaʊtfətaːl], lit. 'Dautphe Valley') is a municipality in Hesse, Germany, and it is among the six larger municipalities of the 22 in Marburg-Biedenkopf district.

== Geography ==
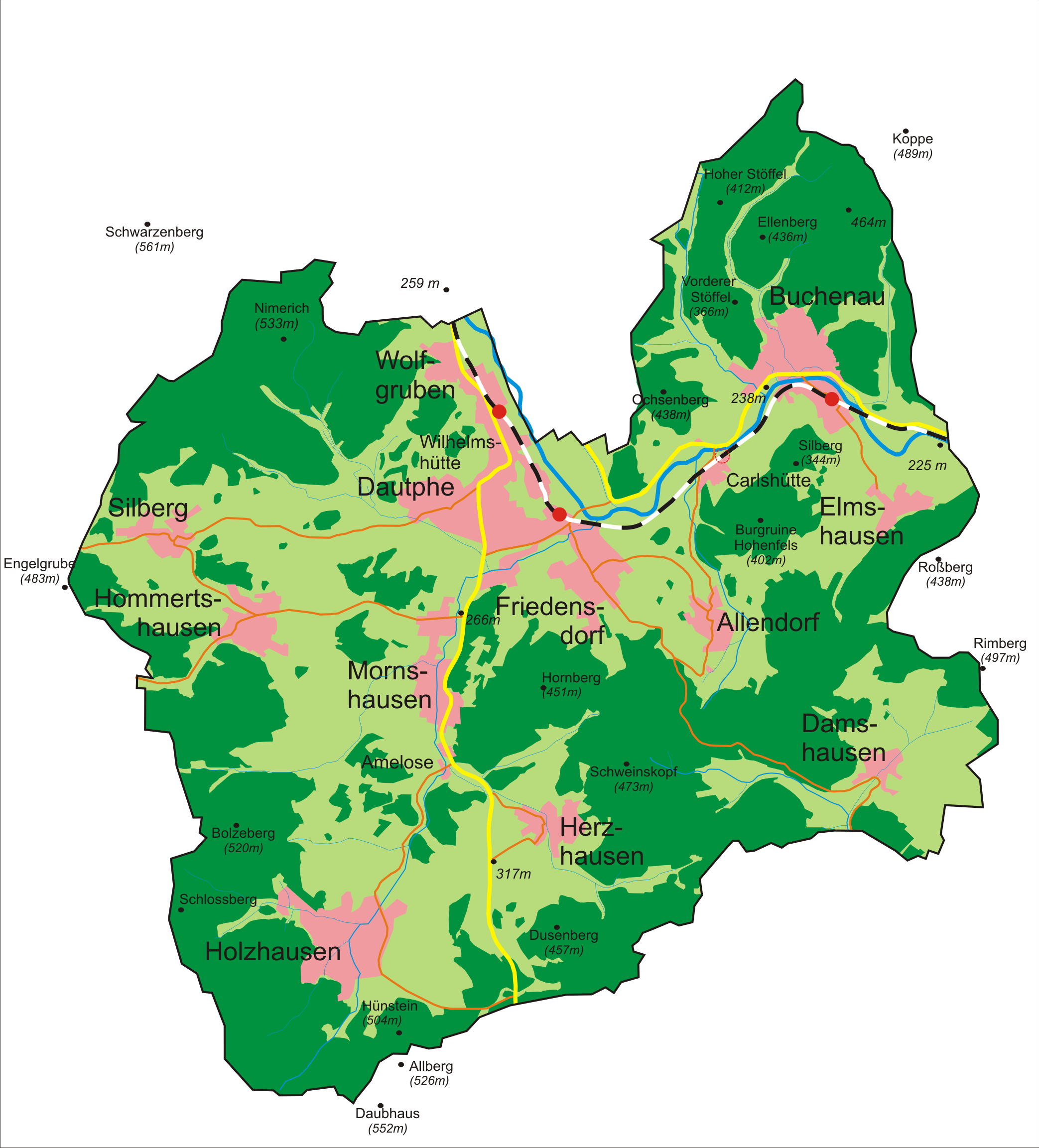
Local map of Dautphetal

The municipality lies in the western part of the district about 37 km east of Siegen and about 15 km west of Marburg in the upper Lahn valley. It is characterized by the Palaeozoic Rhenish Massif (Rheinisches Schiefergebirge). Indeed, this range's foothills from the west meet the Westerwald's from the south and the Rothaargebirge's from the north here. Historically speaking, Dautphetal belongs to the so-called Hessisches Hinterland.

=== Geology ===
Since the municipality is to be found in the Rhenish Massif region, rock from the Palaeozoic Era can be found here. In Dautphetal, common minerals to be found include greywacke, diabases, quartzites, and loam produced by weathering of slate and diabase, but also partly limestone.

The geological zone is known to the Hessian Environmental Atlas (Umweltatlas Hessen) as Dill-Mulde.

Besides the copper ore that can be found here, the municipal area also has deposits of manganese and iron ore.

=== Natural regions ===
Dautphetal's municipal area is classified under the German system of natural regions as follows: The Sackpfeifen foothills (with Wollenberg) (Sackpfeifen-Vorhöhen (mit Wollenberg)) (natural region 332.0) in the area north of the Upper Lahn Valley (Oberes Lahntal) falls under the main unit Ostsauerländer Gebirgsrand. The natural region of the Upper Lahn Valley, 320.2, Bottenhorn Plateau (Bottenhorner Hochflächen, 320.01) as well as the Damshausen Hills (Damshäuser Kuppen, 320.10) belong to the Gladenbach Uplands (Gladenbacher Bergland). The highest mountain in this area is the Nimerich (533 m above sea level) northwest of the constituent municipality of Dautphe. The lowest point anywhere in the area is found on the river Lahn at Elmshausen, where the elevation is 225 m above sea level. East of the municipality's municipal lands at Damshausen lies the Rimberg (mountain, 498 m above sea level).

=== Climate ===
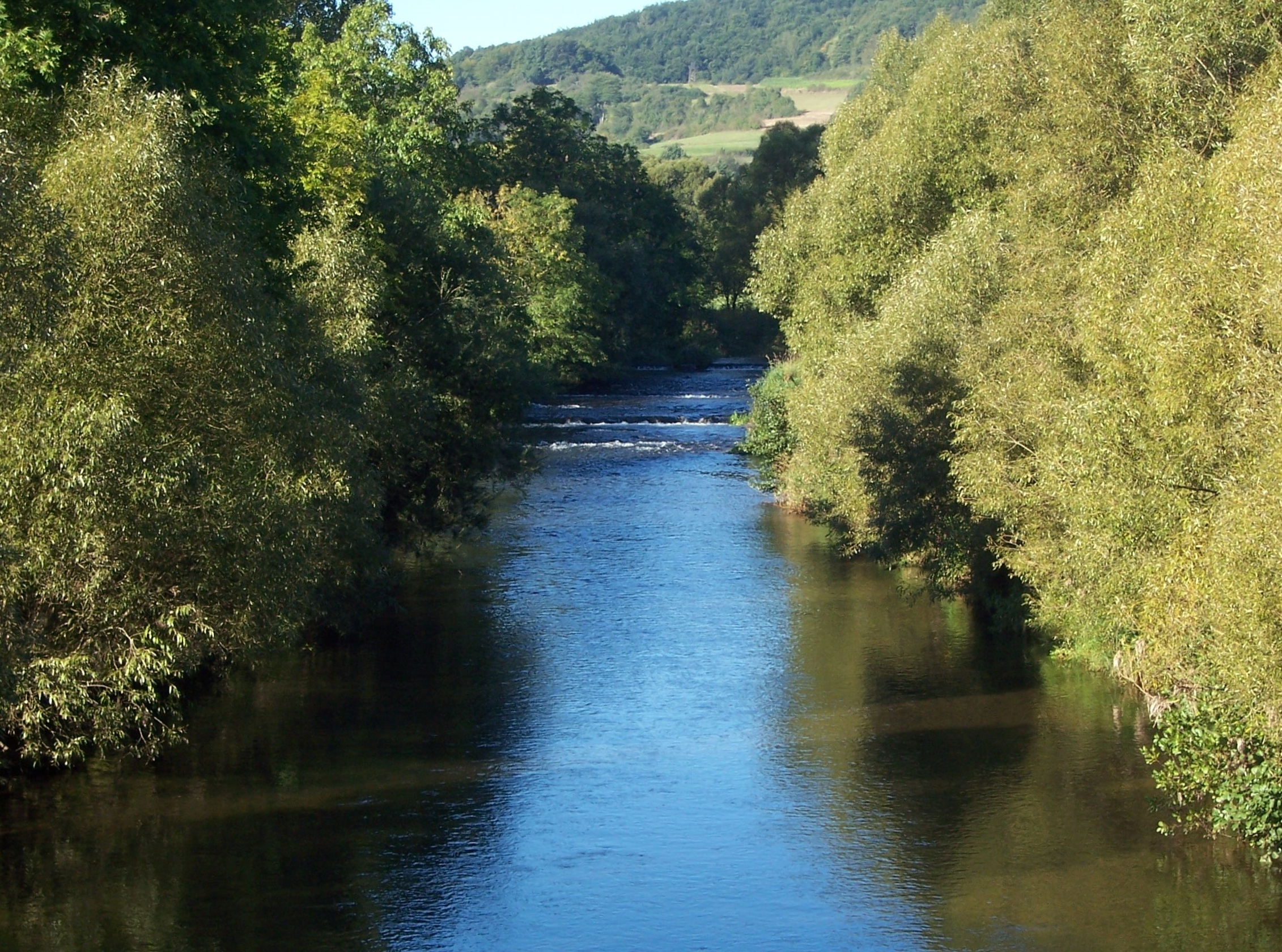
The Lahn in Buchenau

The Dautphetal area has a warm temperate rainy climate, lying as it does in the northern temperate zone of the middle latitudes. The average daytime temperature in the summer is about 15-16 °C (in the Lahn Valley area about 16-17 °C) and in winter about -1 °C to 1 °C. The average yearly rainfall is about 800–1,000 mm in Dautphetal, and in the Buchenau and Elmshausen area about 700–800 mm.

=== Waterways ===
The biggest flowing waterway in Dautphetal is the river Lahn. This flows through the northern part of the municipal area from west to east. The smaller river Dautphe flows, just as all the smaller streams in the municipal area do sooner or later, into the Lahn.

=== Neighbouring municipalities ===
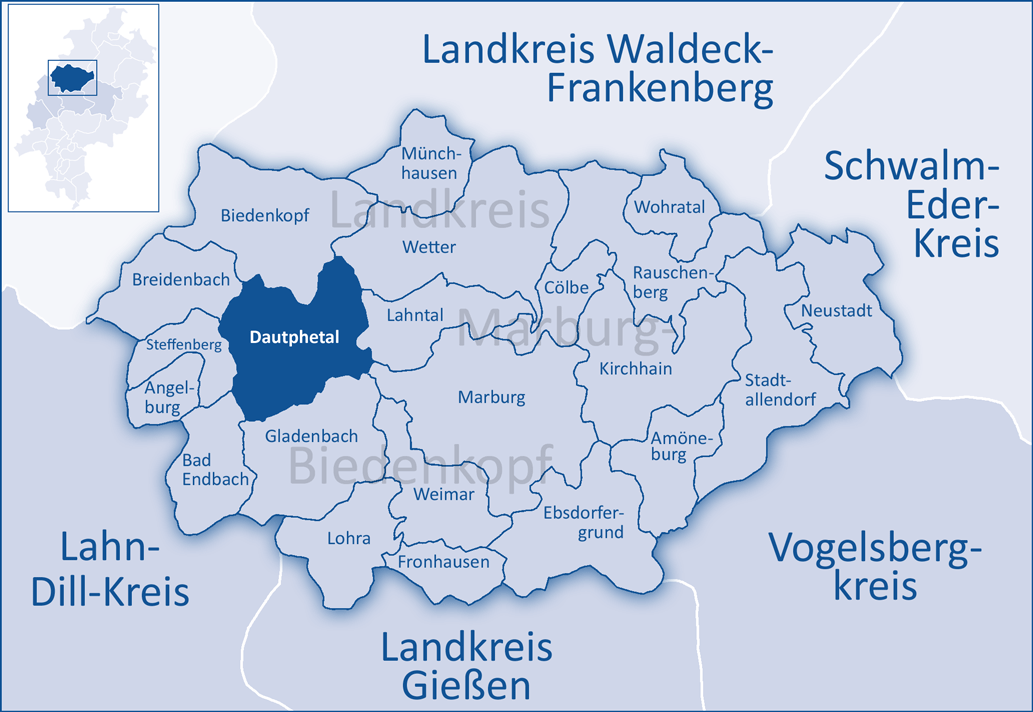
Dautphetal and its neighbouring municipalities

Clockwise from the north, the following municipalities are Dautphetal's neighbours: The towns of Biedenkopf and Wetter (Hessen), the municipalities of Lahntal, the towns of Marburg and Gladenbach, the municipalities of Bad Endbach and Steffenberg as well as the municipality of Breidenbach. All these municipalities likewise lie in the Marburg-Biedenkopf district.

Moreover, other centres can be named, such as the former group of homesteads belonging to Mornshausen and known as Die Amelose, and the two former iron ore smelting centres of Carlshütte (part of Buchenau) and Wilhelmshütte (part of Dautphe).

The constituent municipalities of Dautphe, Friedensdorf and Wilhelmshütte form, with over 4,000 inhabitants, the core of the greater municipality, which was brought about by the appropriate town planning.

== History ==
The history of the greater municipality of Dautphetal still is not very long. It came into being only in 1974 with municipal reform, having formerly been a series of 12 independent villages until the Hesse Landtag legislated new municipal divisions. This did not necessarily meet with everyone's approval. Ever since then, some of the municipalities amalgamated with others under the reform have experienced a kind of "local patriotism" in favour of the old municipalities.

=== Constituent municipalities ===
Dautphetal's municipal area is divided into 12 constituent municipalities (Ortsteile)

municipality	Description
Dautphe Dautphetal's, and the greater municipality's, coat of arms	Dautphe is the municipality's oldest place and at the same time also the seat of the municipal administration. With more than 2,400 inhabitants, it is moreover the biggest of the 12 centres. It was first mentioned in 791. The Wilhelmshütte, earlier Kilianshütte, foundry was built in 1832.
Allendorf Allendorf/Hohenfels	Allendorf am Hohenfels has roughly 690 inhabitants. Its first mention, as Aldendorf, came in 1307 in connection with the Knights of Hohenfels.
Buchenau Buchenau an der Lahn	Buchenau was first mentioned in 1238. It lies in the outermost northeastern part of the greater municipality on Federal Highway (Bundesstraße) 62. With more than 2,000 inhabitants, it is one of the three biggest centres. The Carlshütte foundry was built in 1844.
Damshausen Damshausen	Its fewer than 230 inhabitants make Damshausen the smallest of Dautphetal's constituent municipalities. The place was first mentioned under the name de Tagesmanneshusen in 1251. It is still very agriculturally oriented.
Elmshausen Elmshausen	Elmshausen's history can be dated back to about 1200 or 1220. It lies in the outermost eastern part of the greater municipality and is home to about 370 people.
Friedensdorf Friedensdorf an der Lahn	Friedensdorf forms along with Dautphe the municipality's heart. The place was first mentioned in 1220 and has about 1,500 inhabitants.
Herzhausen Herzhausen	Herzhausen lies in a basin in the southern part of the municipality. Home to roughly 640 people, it was first mentioned in 1333.
Holzhausen Holzhausen am Hünstein	Half-timbered houses with especially fine pargeting are to be found in Holzhausen. The municipality's southernmost village was first mentioned in 1251, and its roughly 2,150 inhabitants make it the second-largest centre after Dautphe.
Hommertshausen Hommertshausen in Dautphetal	In Hommertshausen live about 770 people. It was first mentioned in 1325.
Mornshausen Mornshausen an der Dautphe	Mornshausen is among the central municipalities within the municipal area and is home to 850 people. The first mention of the place can be dated back to 1291. Die Amelose was first mentioned in 1515.
Silberg Silberg	Silberg is in the westernmost reaches of the municipal area. With somewhat more than 500 inhabitants, it is the municipality's third-smallest centre. It was first mentioned in 1339.
Wolfgruben Wolfgruben	Wolfgruben with its over 700 inhabitants was first mentioned in 1257.

=== Rulers ===
==== Antiquity and Middle Ages ====
From finds, it seems likely that the area covered by today's municipality of Dautphetal was already settled in antiquity as also witnessed by ringwall remains such as those on the Rimberg mountain or on the Hünstein (a megalithic monument). The first mention, however, was the naming of a Mark Dautphe in 791. This municipality is therefore the oldest documented place in the greater municipality. It was early on already the site of the Zentgericht, the local court under the local counts. It was the lowest court, but it had within its bailiwick the villages of Allendorf, Buchenau, Damshausen, Dautphe, Elmshausen, Friedensdorf, Holzhausen, Hommertshausen, Mornshausen, Silberg, and Wolfgruben (nowadays in Dautphetal) as well as Eckelshausen, Kombach, Katzenbach, Dexbach, and Engelbach (nowadays in Biedenkopf).

In Charlemagne's time, the area covered by today's municipality of Dautphetal belonged to the Oberlahngau (a noble domain). After the local noble line, the Gisonen, died out, the area fell to Thuringia. Under Sophie von Brabant, Ludwig IV's and Saint Elisabeth's daughter, the Hessian counties, which had come to the Thuringian counties through marriage, once more began their own development by 1264, and under their son Henry I grew into the Landgravate of Hesse (Landgrafschaft Hessen). The Lords of Hohenfels, who alongside the Lords of Hollende were regarded as the local lords, had to forsake their rights in 1249 under pressure from Sophie. Hohenfels Castle was razed in 1293. Only meagre ruins are to be seen of it today.

==== Hesse-Darmstadt and Prussia ====
Ownership of the domain remained under this line until Philip the Magnanimous's death in 1567, at which time the landgravate was divided among four lines, and the Dautphetal area then belonged to Hesse-Marburg. After its line also died out, Hesse-Kassel (or Hesse-Cassel) and Hesse-Darmstadt then fought over the territory, with the latter under its own landgrave eventually winning out, taking the so-called Hinterland in 1648. As a result of the Austro-Prussian War in 1866, the Biedenkopf district, formed in 1832 and in which lies what is today Dautphetal, was ceded to Prussia. This district was for a short time (1932–33) united with the Dillenburg district before the districts of Biedenkopf and Marburg were made to form the still functioning Marburg-Biedenkopf district in Hesse's 1974 municipal reform.

=== Population development ===
What follows is an explanation of the population development of today's municipality of Dautphetal. What stands out is that the first small surge in population in the time of industrialization comes before another one right after the Second World War which saw the population figure rise by almost 50%. This can be explained by the great number of refugees who came and settled in the area after the war, especially from Hungary. The town sisterhood with Cikó in Hungary came to be not the least because of this. Since peaking in 2002 with 13,000 inhabitants, the figure has been stagnating.

Population figure development^{1}:

Date	Population	Date	Population	Date	Population
3 December 1834^{1}	3,503	1 December 1895^{1}	4,520	30 June 1967^{1}	10,568
3 December 1840^{1}	3,742	1 December 1905^{1}	4,996	31 December 1998	12,821
3 December 1846^{1}	3,936	1 December 1910^{1}	5,421	31 December 1999	12,944
3 December 1852^{1}	4,055	16 June 1925^{1}	6,017	31 December 2000	12,987
3 December 1858^{1}	4,071	17 May 1939^{1}	6,499	31 December 2001	12,983
3 December 1864^{1}	4,060	29 October 1946^{1}	9,389	31 December 2002	13,007
1 December 1871^{1}	3,943	13 September 1950^{1}	9,408	31 December 2003	12,982
1 December 1875^{1}	4,272	25 September 1956^{1}	9,110	31 December 2004	12,925
1 December 1885^{1}	4,383	6 September 1961^{1}	9,604		

^{1}: Figures from before 1974 have outlying centres' figures added.

Source 1834 - 1967: Historisches Gemeindeverzeichnis für Hessen Heft 1, Die Bevölkerung der Gemeinden 1834 - 1967, Hess. Stat. Landesamt

Source after 1998: Statistik der Gemeinde Dautphetal

== Politics ==
=== 2006 municipal election ===
Municipality representatives were last chosen on 26 March 2006 for a five-year term. The SPD lost two seats while the Freie Wähler ("Free Voters", a citizens' coalition) gained three more and the Bürgerliste Dautphetal ("Dautphetal Citizens' List") lost out utterly. Participation in the election fell by 8.5% from 59.3% in 2001 to 50.8%. Of 9,030 eligible voters, only 4,589 went to the polls. The next municipal election in Hesse will take place in March 2011.

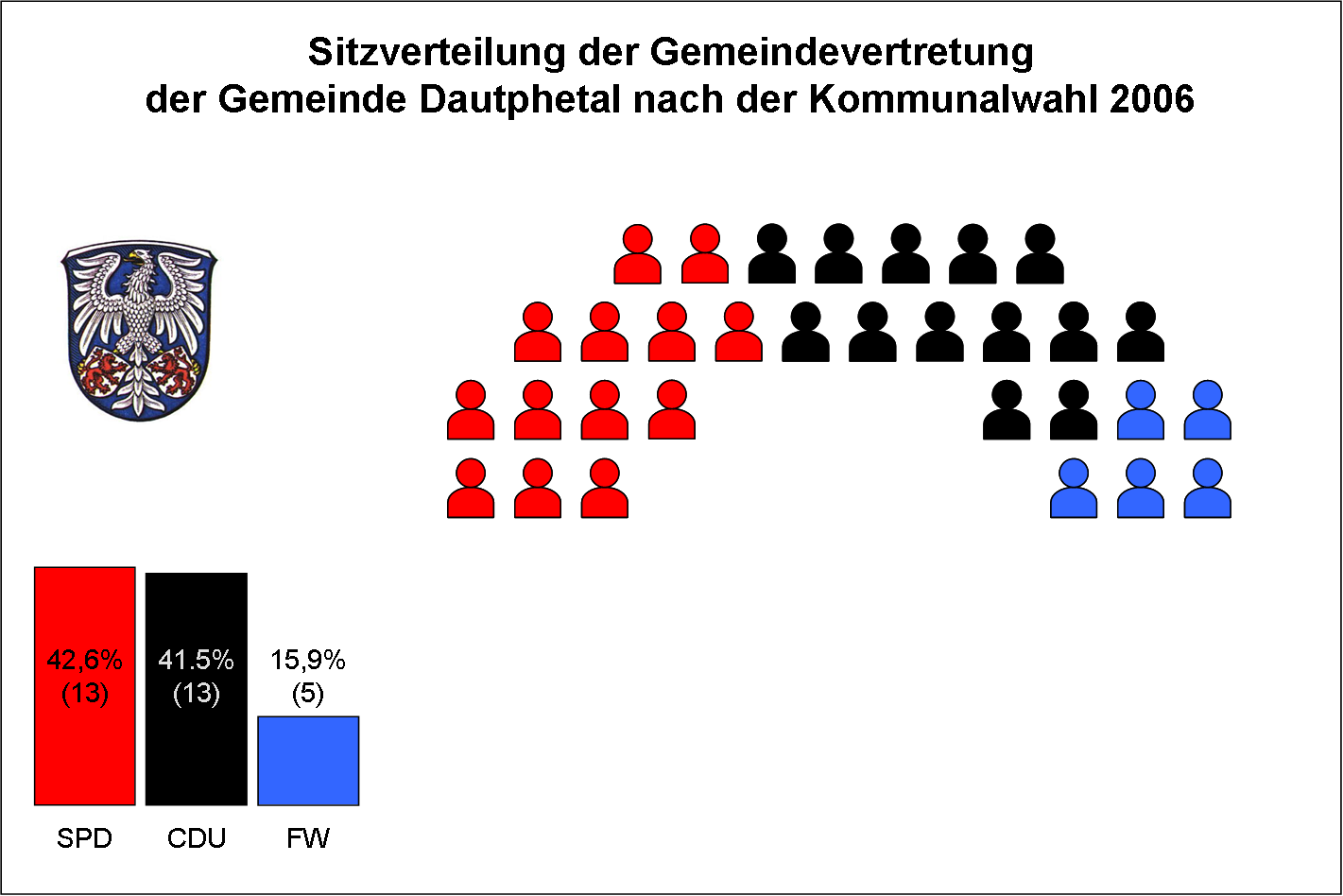

Parties and voter groups		Share (%)	Seats
CDU	Christian Democratic Union	41.5	13
SPD	Social Democratic Party of Germany	42.6	13
FW	Freie Wähler Dautphetal	15.9	5
total		100	31

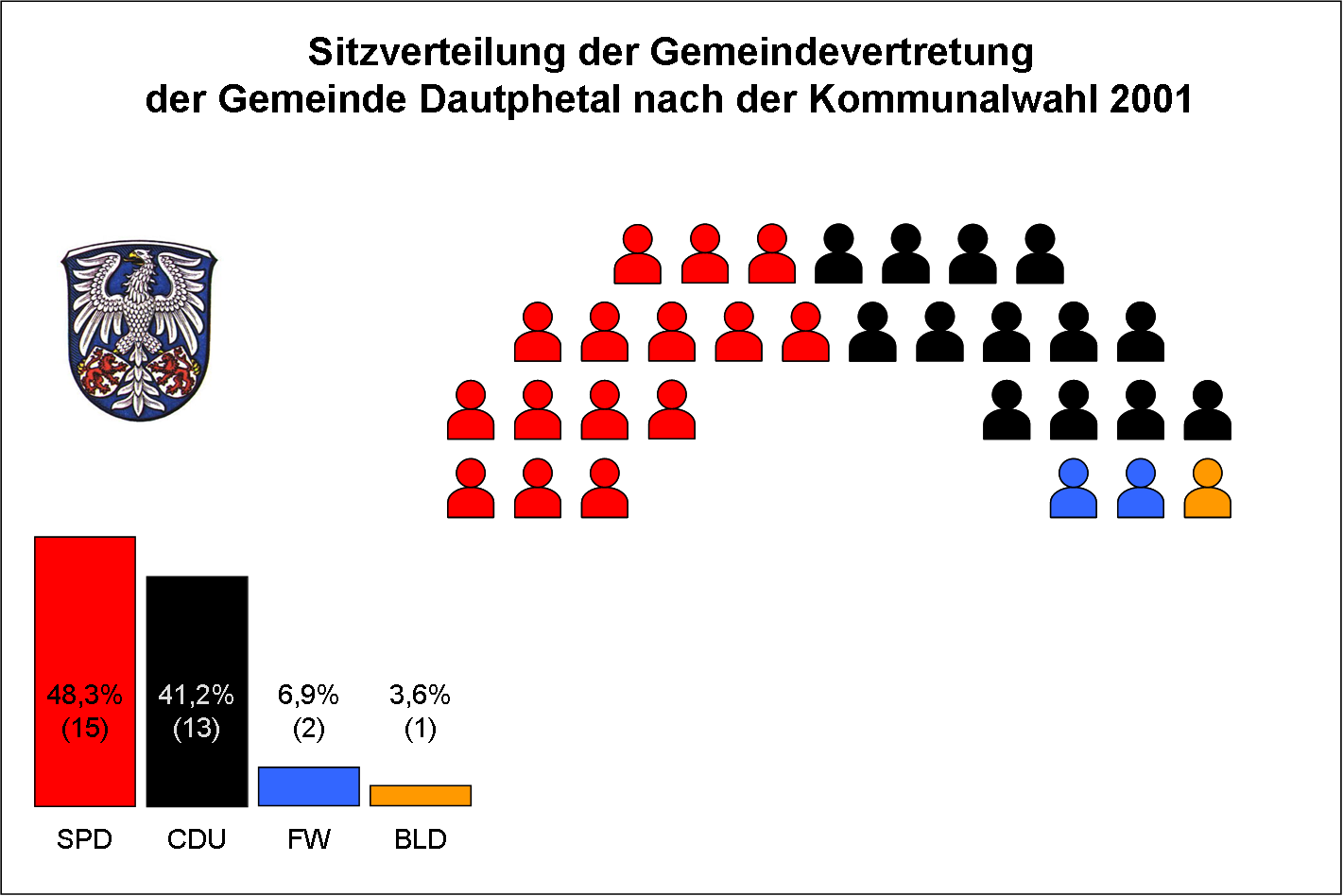
Seat distribution after municipal election on 18 March 2001

At the last municipal election on 18 March 2001, the result was as seen at left. The number of seats had been reduced from 37 in 1997.

=== Mayor ===
The greater municipality's first mayor in 1974 was Hans Hauswirth (CDU). He led the municipality for thirty years, leaving office only in 2004. On 21 March of that year, Bernd Schmidt of the Free Voters' municipality became Dautphetal's new mayor.

=== Town partnerships ===
- Cikó, Hungary, since 1997.
- (Germany) Diesdorf, Saxony-Anhalt, partnership between Evangelical-Lutheran parishes in the two places.
- (Russia) Kazan, Russian Tatarstan, partnership between Evangelical-Lutheran parish in Dautphetal and Russian-Evangelical parish in Kazan.

== Religion ==
=== Institutions ===
- Evangelical-Lutheran parishes
- Free Evangelical parishes
- Catholic parishes
- New Apostolic Church in Hesse
- Christliche Versammlung ("Christian Assembly")
- Herborn-Dillenburger Werk Ev. Gemeinschaftsverein (Evangelical association)

== Economy and infrastructure ==
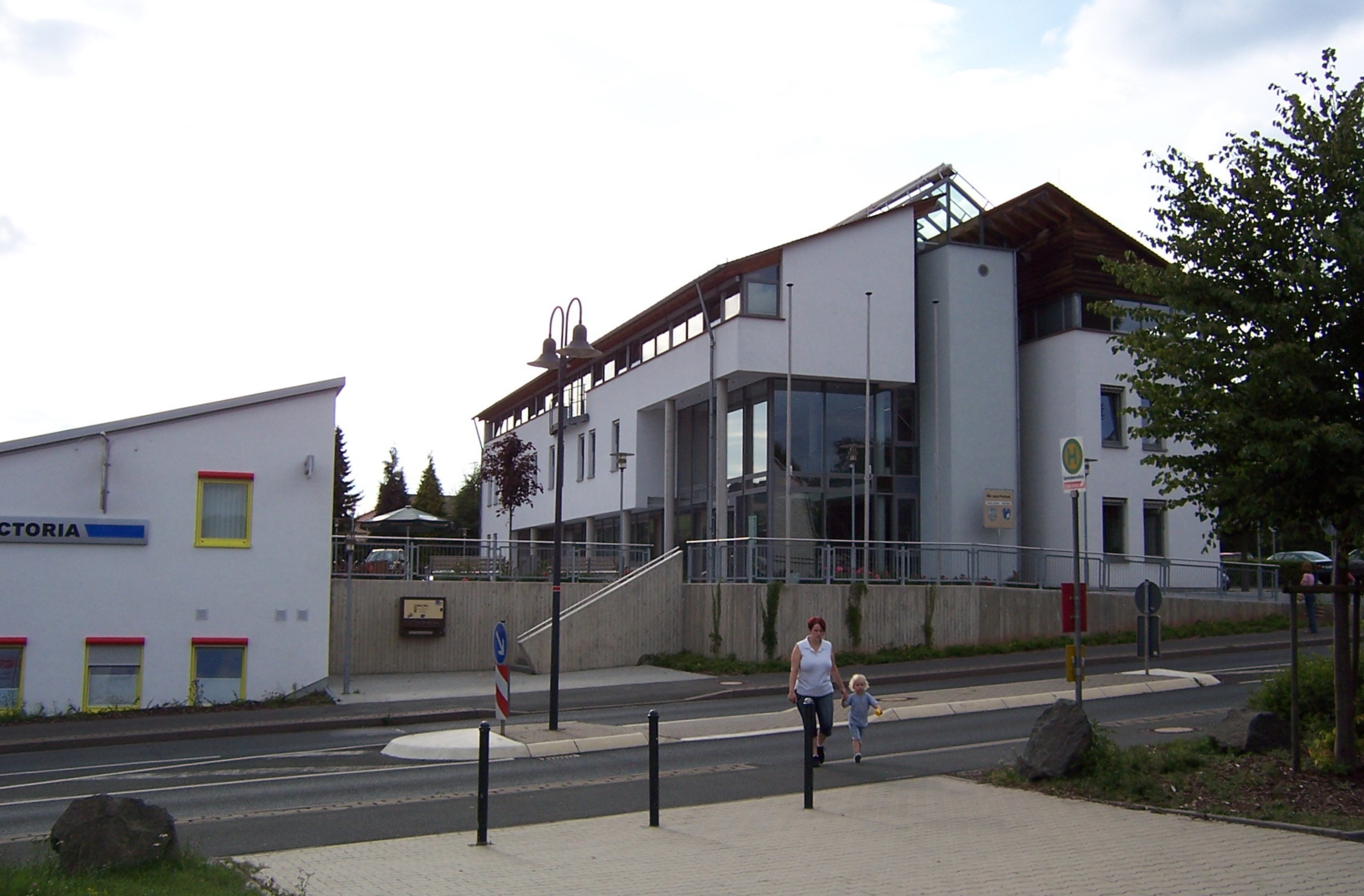
Town hall in Dautphe

The economy in Dautphetal is evenly split between industry and trade, while the services sector is a bit smaller. Historically, the one industry that has grown especially in strength and is particularly well represented is the steel and moulding industry. Although Dautphetal with the Lahn valley and its widespread woodlands offers good potential for recreation and tourism, it has hitherto not been exploited as such. Over the last few years, however, some small development has been seen in this field of endeavour, as witnessed by the membership of the regional Lahn-Dill-Bergland club.

=== Established enterprises ===
The greatest employer in the municipality is the firm Roth Industries GmbH & Co. KG. This worldwide active business has all together more than 1,100 workers. After being founded in 1947 as a simple handicraft business, the firm has steadily grown and is nowadays represented in Europe, North and South America, and even in China. Alongside household products (such as shower partitions), synthetic manufacturing and environmental technology (tank manufacturing), companies in machine building and aggregate manufacture are parts of the conglomerate.

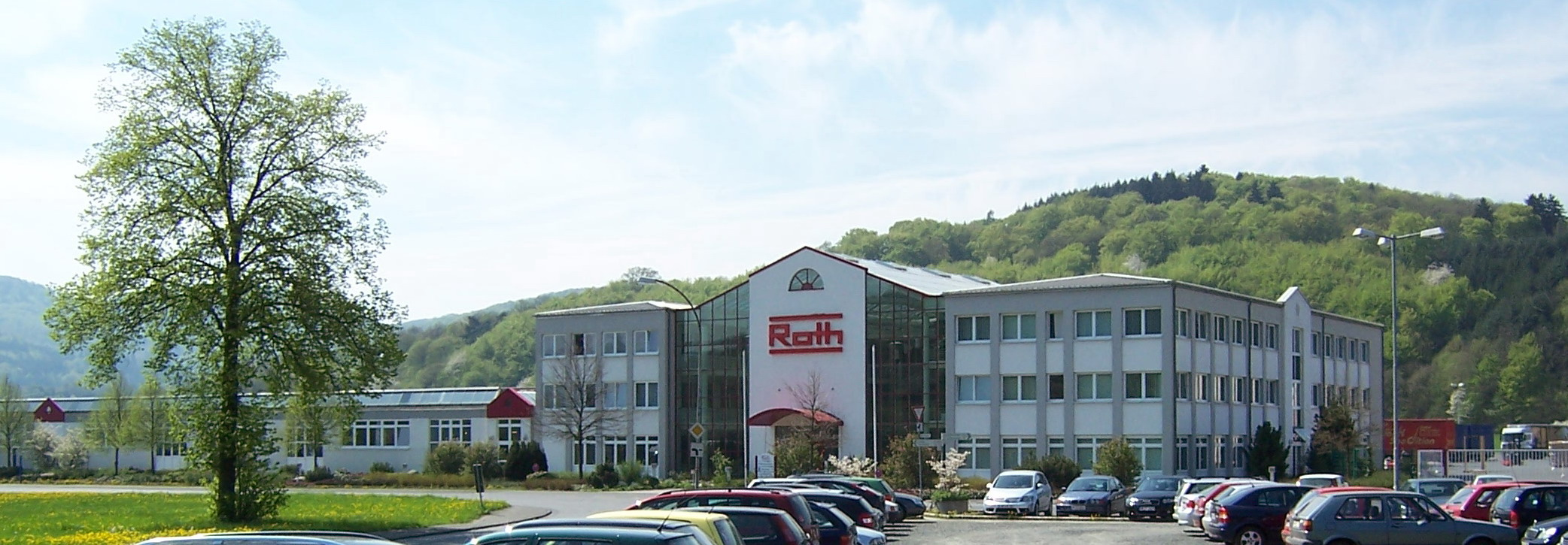
Roth's reception building with atrium

Johnson Controls maintains a location in Friedensdorf. This company makes vehicle fuel tanks and car seats, employing 200 people to do so.

The firm Bamberger, formerly Europe's third-biggest manufacturer of enamelled-steel bathtubs, and with 200 employees one of the biggest firms in the municipality, was taken over by the Kaldewei company and in 2005 it was broken up.

=== Planning ===
In the 2001 Middle Hesse Regional Plan, Dautphetal is designated a low centre in the rural area (in terms of Walter Christaller's Central Place Theory). Dautphe and Friedensdorf, it is said in this plan, are the central municipalities. Furthermore, the greater municipality is part of the Marburg - Dautphetal - Biedenkopf - (Bad Laasphe) regional development belt. This belt's job is to open up the region, to make possible an exchange of goods and services between middle centres as well as to connect the region to the high centre of Marburg and to the long-distance transportation network. Building on public transport is thus given special importance.

Moreover, there exists a local transport and population belt, Dautphetal - Gladenbach, with a regional connective function. Together with Biedenkopf and Breidenbach, Dautphetal is described as a commercial hub.

=== Transport ===
==== Highway ====
The main road in Dautphetal is Federal Highway (Bundesstraße) 62. This interregionally important road leads from eastern North Rhine-Westphalia (Siegen) through Middle Hesse (Dautphetal, Marburg) and East Hesse (Alsfeld, Bad Hersfeld) to Thuringia (Bad Salzungen) thereby fulfilling the function of interregional transportation axis. Across the municipality's municipal area, it runs east-west, going through Buchenau. Bundesstraße 453, which is only 15 km long, branches off B 62 in the neighbouring municipality of Biedenkopf, leading in a southerly direction through the centres of Wolfgruben, Dautphe, Mornshausen and Herzhausen on its way to Gladenbach.

The nearest Autobahnen are Bundesautobahn 45 about 30 km away to the west in Dillenburg which goes towards Dortmund in one direction and Frankfurt am Main in the other, Bundesautobahn 485 in the southeast towards Gießen connected by the expresswaylike Bundesstraße 3 at Marburg (about 15 km away), Bundesautobahn 5 about 45 km to the east at Homburg leading to Basel in the south and Hamburg in the north, and Bundesautobahn 49 to the northeast connected by Bundesstraße 3 and leading to Kassel. An extension to this last expressway towards Marburg is planned. However, transport, economic and planning interests on the one hand, and ecological and nature preservation concerns on the other have found themselves at odds, meaning that thus far, no acceptable route has been found for the new roadway.

Local public transportation is afforded by the two regional buslines 481 (RKH line 5301) and 491 (RKH line 5356), as well as by four local bus routes, MR-41, MR-52, MR-55 and MR-57, which are meant to improve connections within the municipality.

==== Railway ====
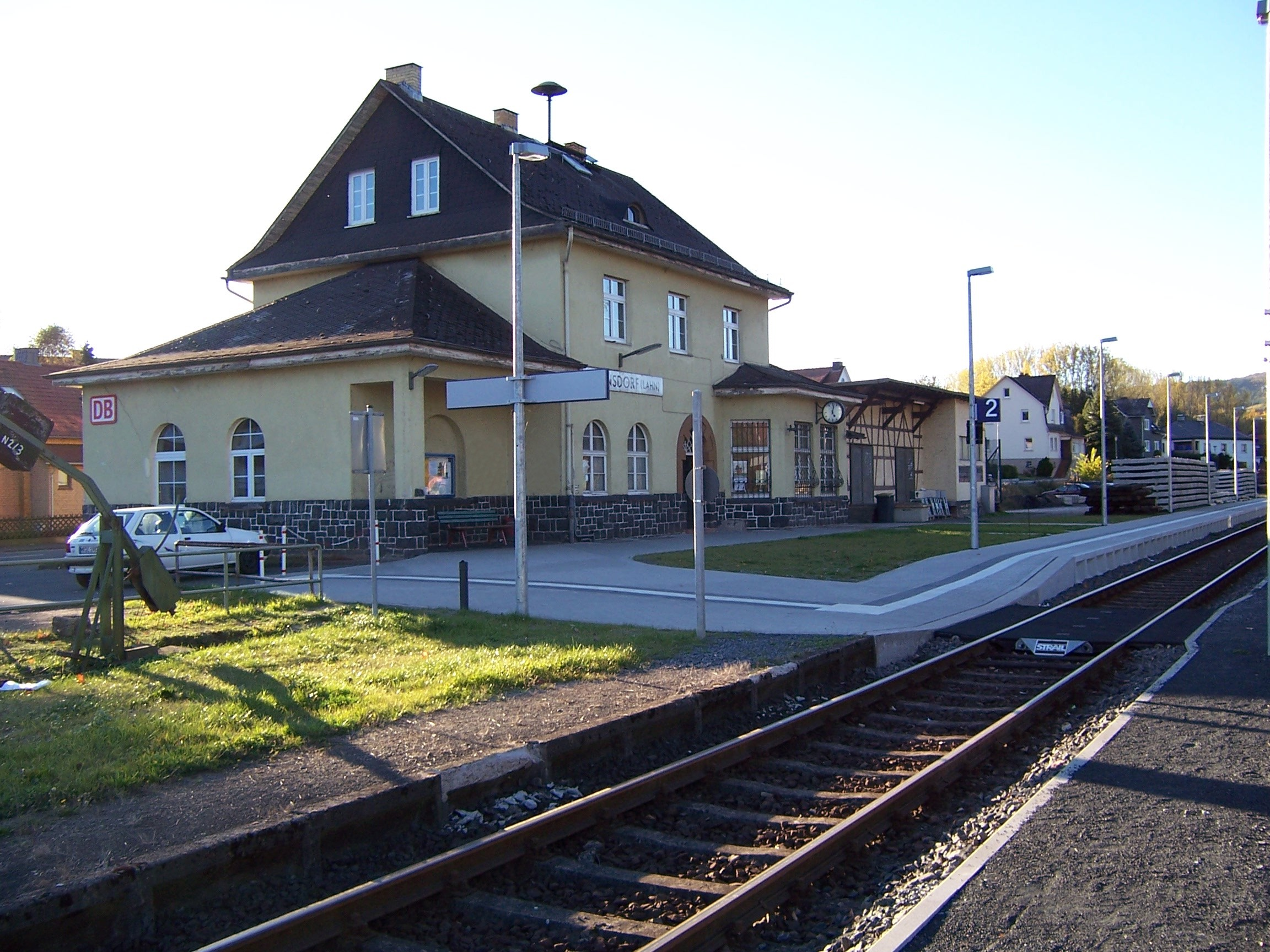
Friedensdorf railway station with modernized platform

Local rail transport is afforded by the Obere Lahntalbahn, a Deutsche Bahn line also designated as Line 43 of the Rhine-Main Transport Association, running from Erndtebrück in Siegen-Wittgenstein district to the town of Marburg by way of Bad Laasphe and Biedenkopf and serving the Dautphetal stations of Wilhelmshütte (Lahn), Friedendorf (Lahn) and Buchenau (Lahn). The last two named stations are conveniently placed for the Hesse cross-country bicycle path (Hessischer Radfernweg) R 2.

On weekdays there are 21 journeys between 5:30 and 21:00, on Saturdays 13 between 6:45 and 19:00 and on Sundays 12 between 8:45 and 19:00. All trains allow bicycles.

In Marburg are connections to DB's long-distance rail network.

==== Air transport ====
The immediate vicinity has two special airfields at Bad Endbach-Bottenhorn and Eschenburg-Hirzenhain as well as a commercial airfield at Cölbe-Schönstadt. The nearest greater airport is Frankfurt International Airport at Frankfurt am Main.

==== Bicycle and hiking trails ====
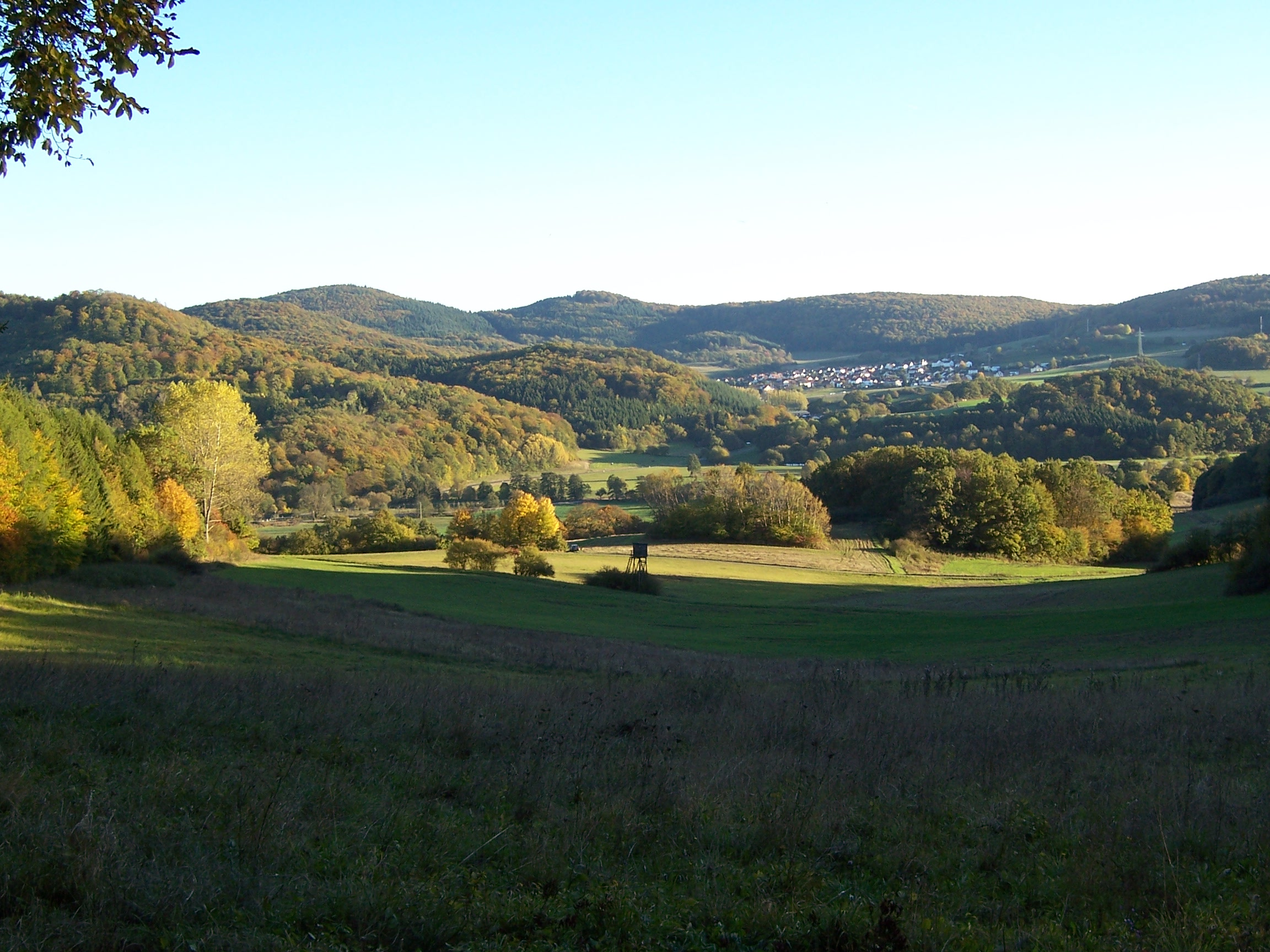
View of Allendorf and in the middle the narrow Lahn valley

Owing to its advantageous location in a low mountain range and its attendant great forests and idyllic dales, the whole region is endowed with a substantial trail network. Its potential, however, was only recognized a few years ago and has been organizationally supported for a short time by the association Lahn-Dill-Bergland e. V.

=== Public institutions ===
Friedensdorf has since the 1950s been the site of an electrical substation. There, high-voltage current at 110 kV is stepped down to the middle voltage of 20 kV. After the transformers' useful working life had come to an end, a 20 kV switchgear set and new open-air transformer fields were installed in 1998. The substation is run by E.ON Mitte.

=== Education ===
In each of the bigger centres in the municipality is found a kindergarten. Only Damshausen, Elmshausen and Silberg do not have their own. Holzhausen and Buchenau each also have a primary school, the latter's having had until 2006 an attached orientation programme (Förderstufe) which was discontinued because the class-size threshold was no longer being met.

In Friedensdorf, alongside the Dautphetalschule with its primary school and Hauptschule and Realschule branch, itself with an orientation programme, there is the Burgbergschule, a school for learning and educational help. A school for the educable mentally handicapped with a department for those who also have physical handicaps is located in Hommertshausen. In Wilhelmshütte is found the Jule-Spannagel-Schule for hard to educate youth.

Further schooling such as vocational schools and colleges (or the like) or professional Gymnasien are to be found in the surrounding towns of Marburg, Biedenkopf, Bad Laasphe or Gladenbach.

Technical colleges or universities are found in Marburg (Philipps University of Marburg), Gießen (Justus-Liebig-Universität and University of Applied Sciences Giessen-Friedberg), Kassel (University of Kassel) and Siegen (University of Siegen).

In the field of adult education, the district maintains two branches (Dautphetal and Dautphetal-Holzhausen) of the Volkshochschule Marburg-Biedenkopf.

=== Social institutions ===
Alongside many mostly Christian-based institutions like the Blue Cross (Blaues Kreuz), there are many other social institutions in Dautphetal. For one, there is the Seniorenzentrum Dautphetal which serves as a nursing home and a residence for the elderly, and for another, there are the Hinterländer Werkstätten, a recognized workshop for the handicapped. The Evangelical spiritual guidance centre help center e.V. has set itself the goal of helping youth in crisis on the basis of Christian belief.

=== Media ===
In Dautphetal, the Oberhessische Presse and the Hinterländer Anzeiger are the two daily newspapers, with the latter taking the greater part of the market share. A local section for the old district of Biedenkopf is published by the Oberhessische Presse from Marburg. Furthermore, there is a whole range of advertising flyers such as Hinterland extra from the Oberhessische Presse, the MAZ (Mittelhessische Anzeigen Zeitung, or Middle Hesse Advertising Newspaper) or the Sonntag Morgenmagazin ("Sunday Morning Magazine") from publishing houses in Gießen.

== Culture and sightseeing ==
=== Museums ===
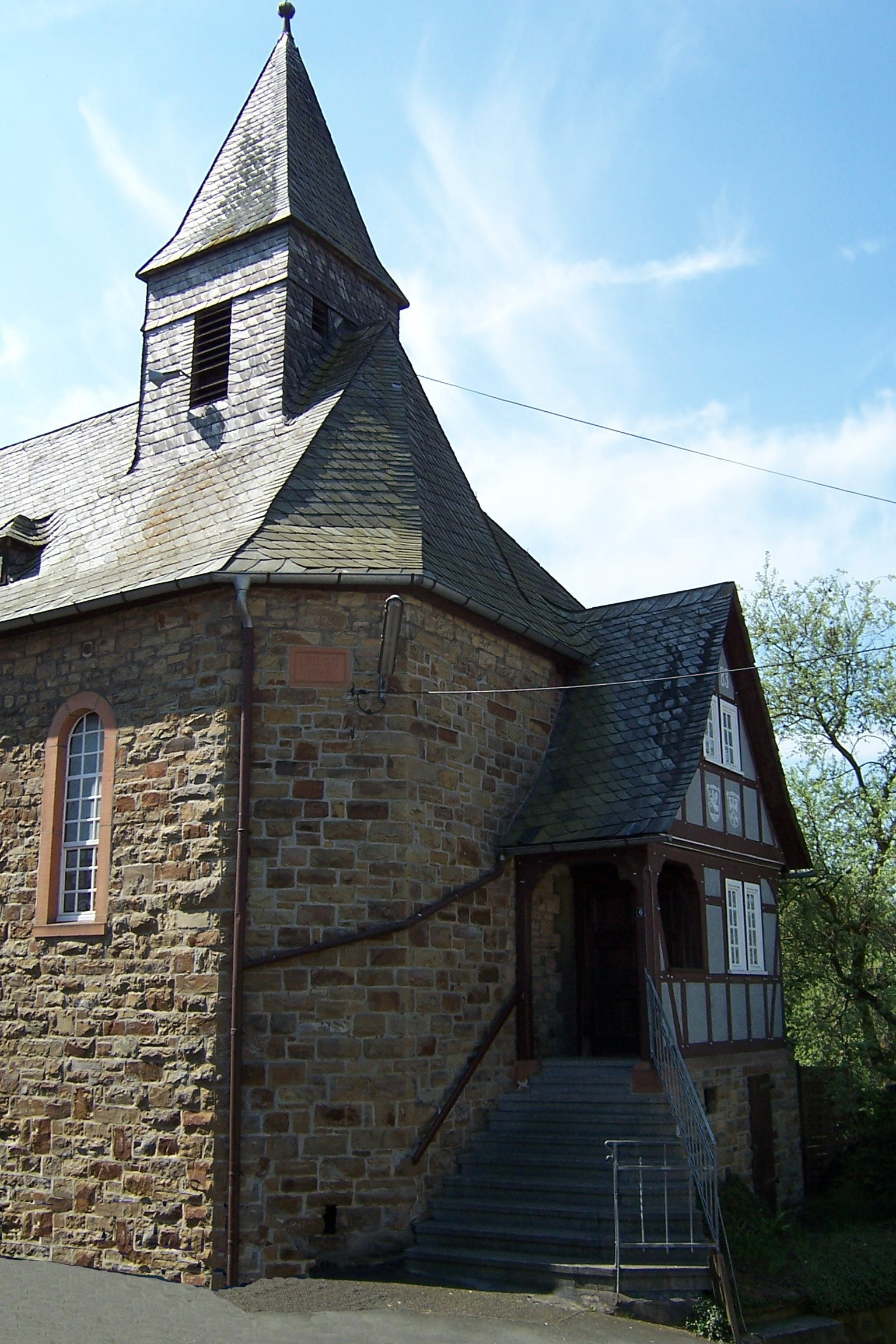
The Old Church in Friedensdorf

In the municipality of Friedensdorf, the "Old Church" (Alte Kirche) has a weaving room, old photographs and a dialectal archive to visit. From time to time, there are also special exhibits.

The Heimatmuseum Altes Rathaus at the old town hall in Buchenau shows exhibits particularly having to do with household and kitchen, especially from the 1920s to the 1950s.

In the Mini-Museum „Backes Stibbcher“ in Dautphe, visitors can see a petit-bourgeois 3-room flat from the turn of the twentieth century housing typical exhibits from Dautphe's local history. Moreover, there are exhibits of Dautphe costume and old documents (photographs, maps, registers, family chronicles of Dautphe's oldest families, etc.).

=== Clubs ===
The municipality of Dautphetal harbours an unusually high number of clubs. Near each centre, alongside the well over 30 sport clubs dealing in everything from football to tennis, gymnastics, riding, motor sports and even balloon flying, are a trombone choir and men's or women's choirs. There are moreover, of course, other music clubs such as singing clubs, a Jägerchor ("hunters' choir") or a brass band. The more than 12,000 inhabitants therefore have all together "almost 50 dance and music clubs" to choose from. In the field of animal, breeding or protection clubs, many fowl breeding as well as nature preservation and gardening clubs can be named. Last but not least, more than 40 culture- or homeland-related clubs are at the municipality's disposal.

=== Buildings ===
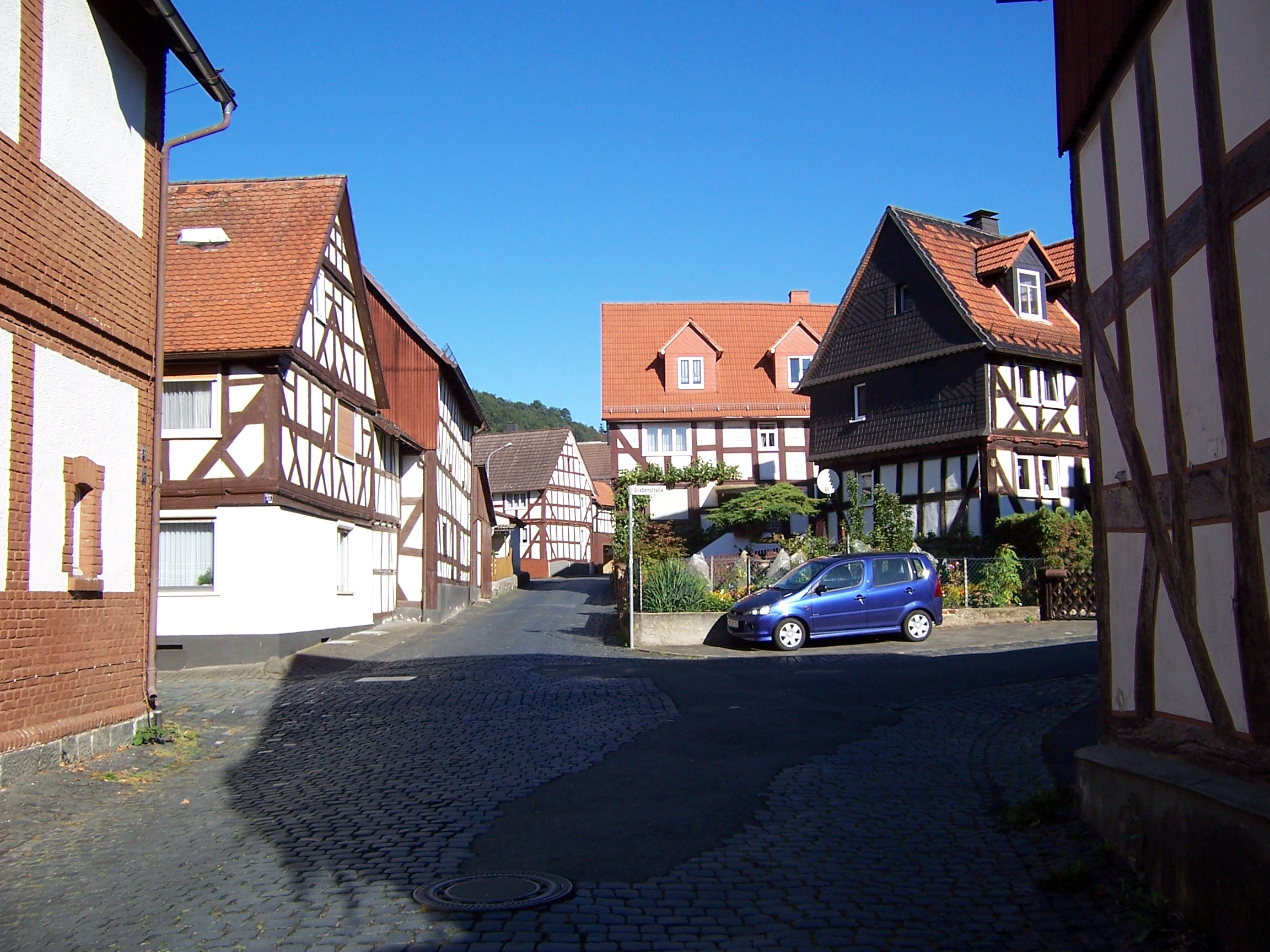
Buchenau's Old Town

Most constituent municipalities' cores are made up of half-timbered houses. Sometimes there are also little half-timbered churches preserved, such as the ones in Hommertshausen and Silberg. The Kratzputzfachwerkhäuser in Holzhausen am Hünstein, half-timbered houses with pargeting (etched plasterwork), are actually protected monuments.

At the summit of the Rimberg stands the 24-m tall Rimberg Tower, dedicated on 30 April 1977. It is the second tower to stand there, the last one having fallen victim to a storm. On clear weather there is a view with 360° panorama.

The Carlshütte was built in 1844 as ironworks, and is likewise a protected monument. It came into being as a result of industrialization and its advantageous location between the Lahn, which delivered its energy and the nearby iron ore deposits.

Other buildings:

- Historic church (Martinskirche) in Dautphe
- Wehrkirche (church built to look like a fortification) in Buchenau

=== Regular events ===
Along with the many events organized by local village fraternities and sororities (Burschenschaften and Mädchenschaften), the Christmas Market in Buchenau has grown to quite a size. A particular high point is the Grenzgangsfest, held every seven years in Buchenau and relating to an old custom that centuries ago was designed to limit encroachment on the village's woodlands by neighbouring municipalities. The next Grenzgangsfest is in 2020.

== Personalities ==
=== Sons and daughters of the town ===
- Albrecht Ohly (1829–1891), Mayor of Darmstadt (1874–1891)
- Dieter Trautwein (1928–2002), Evangelical theologian and songwriter

== Literature ==
- Huth, Karl: Dautphe: Herz einer geschichtlichen Kulturlandschaft, Dautphe: Gemeindevorstand der Gemeinde Dautphe 1973
- Huth, Karl: Verwaltungsgeschichte des Landkreises Biedenkopf, Biedenkopf: Kreisausschuss des Landkreises 1957
