= Biedenkopf =

- Town
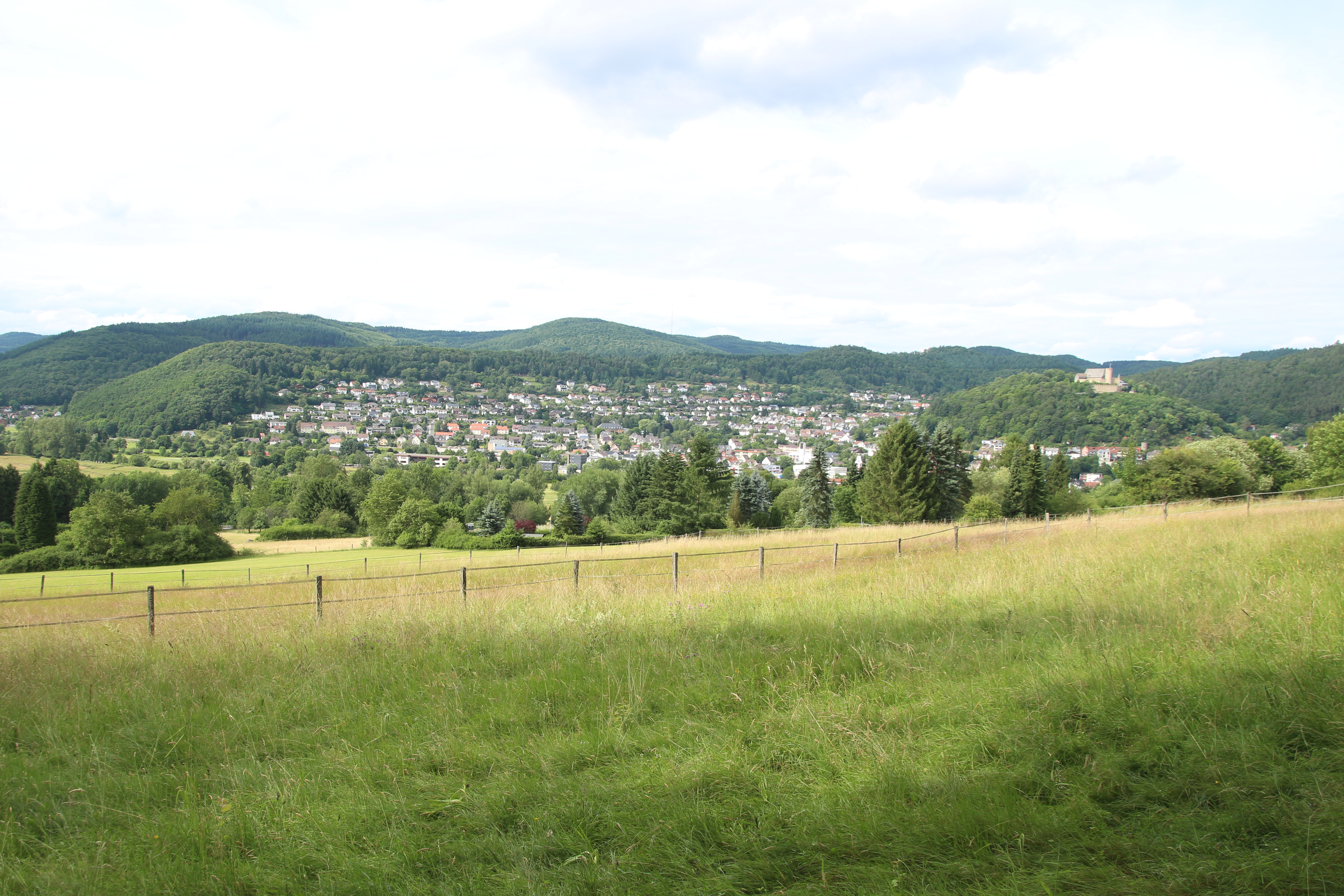
- Biedenkopf

- Coat of arms

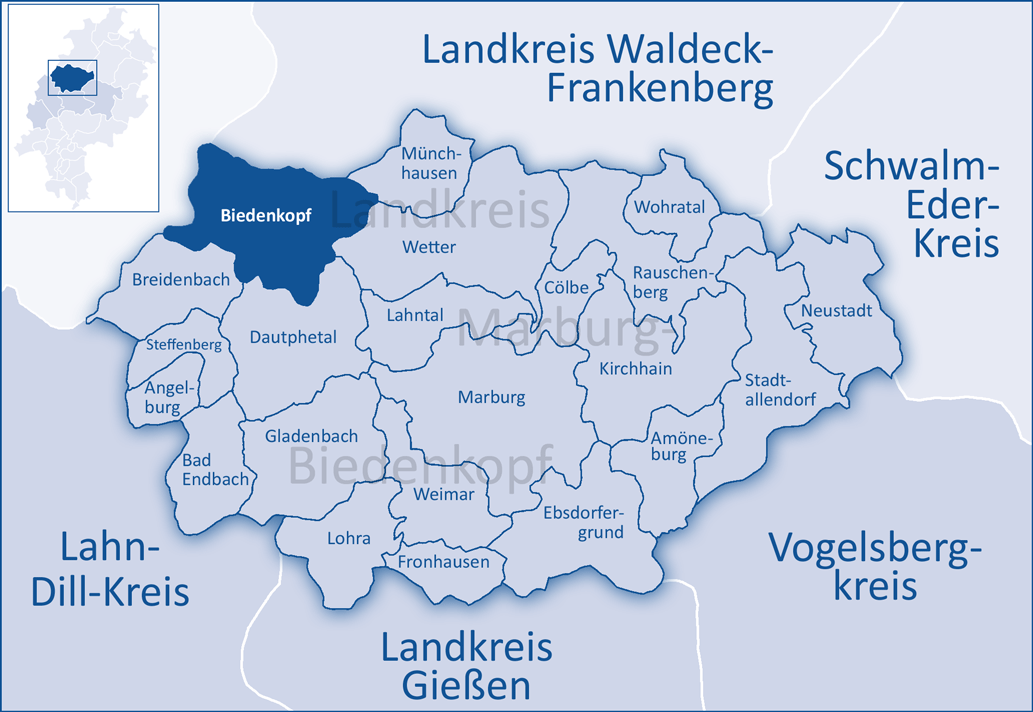
- Location of Biedenkopf within Marburg-Biedenkopf district
- Interactive map of Biedenkopf
- Location within Germany Location within Hesse
- Coordinates: 50°54′46″N 08°31′56″E
- Country: Germany
- State: Hesse
- Admin. region: Gießen
- District: Marburg-Biedenkopf
- Subdivisions: 9 Ortsteile bzw. Stadtbezirke

Government
  - Mayor (2022–28): Jochen Achenbach (CDU)

Area
  - Total: 90.31 km^{2} (34.87 sq mi)
- Elevation: 261–674 m (856–2,211 ft)

Population (2025-12-31)
  - Total: 12,932
  - Density: 143.2/km^{2} (370.9/sq mi)
- Time zone: UTC+01:00 (CET)
  - Summer (DST): UTC+02:00 (CEST)
- Postal codes: 35216
- Dialling codes: 06461
- Vehicle registration: MR, BID
- Website: www.biedenkopf.de

Biedenkopf (German pronunciation: [ˈbiːdn̩ˌkɔpf]) is a spa town in western Hesse, Germany with a population of 12,969 (2024).

== Geography ==
=== Location ===
The town of Biedenkopf lies in the west of Marburg-Biedenkopf district. Ringed by mountains reaching up to 674 metres (2,211 ft)above sea level – the Sackpfeife in the Rothaargebirge reaches this height – the town lies on the upper reaches of the river Lahn. Together with 18 other municipalities, it belongs to the Lahn-Dill-Bergland region.

=== Neighbouring municipalities ===
Clockwise from the north, the following towns and municipalities border on Biedenkopf: the towns of Hatzfeld and Battenberg in Waldeck-Frankenberg district, in Marburg-Biedenkopf district the towns of Münchhausen am Christenberg and Wetter and the municipalities of Dautphetal and Breidenbach as well as the towns of Bad Laasphe and Bad Berleburg in Siegen-Wittgenstein district.

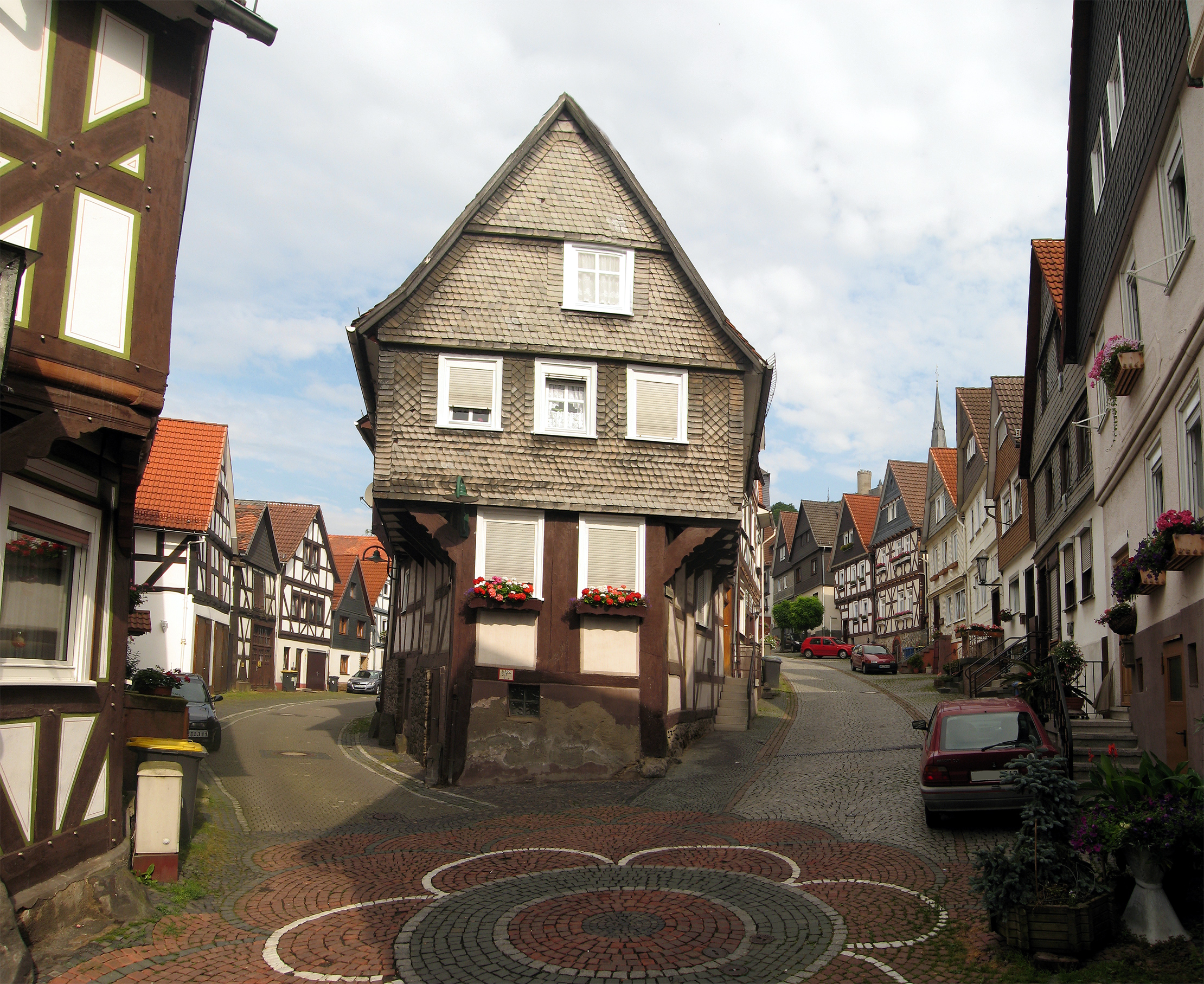
Timberwork in Biederkopf

=== Divisions within the town ===
- Biedenkopf
- Breidenstein
- Dexbach
- Eckelshausen
- Engelbach
- Katzenbach
- Kombach
- Wallau
- Weifenbach

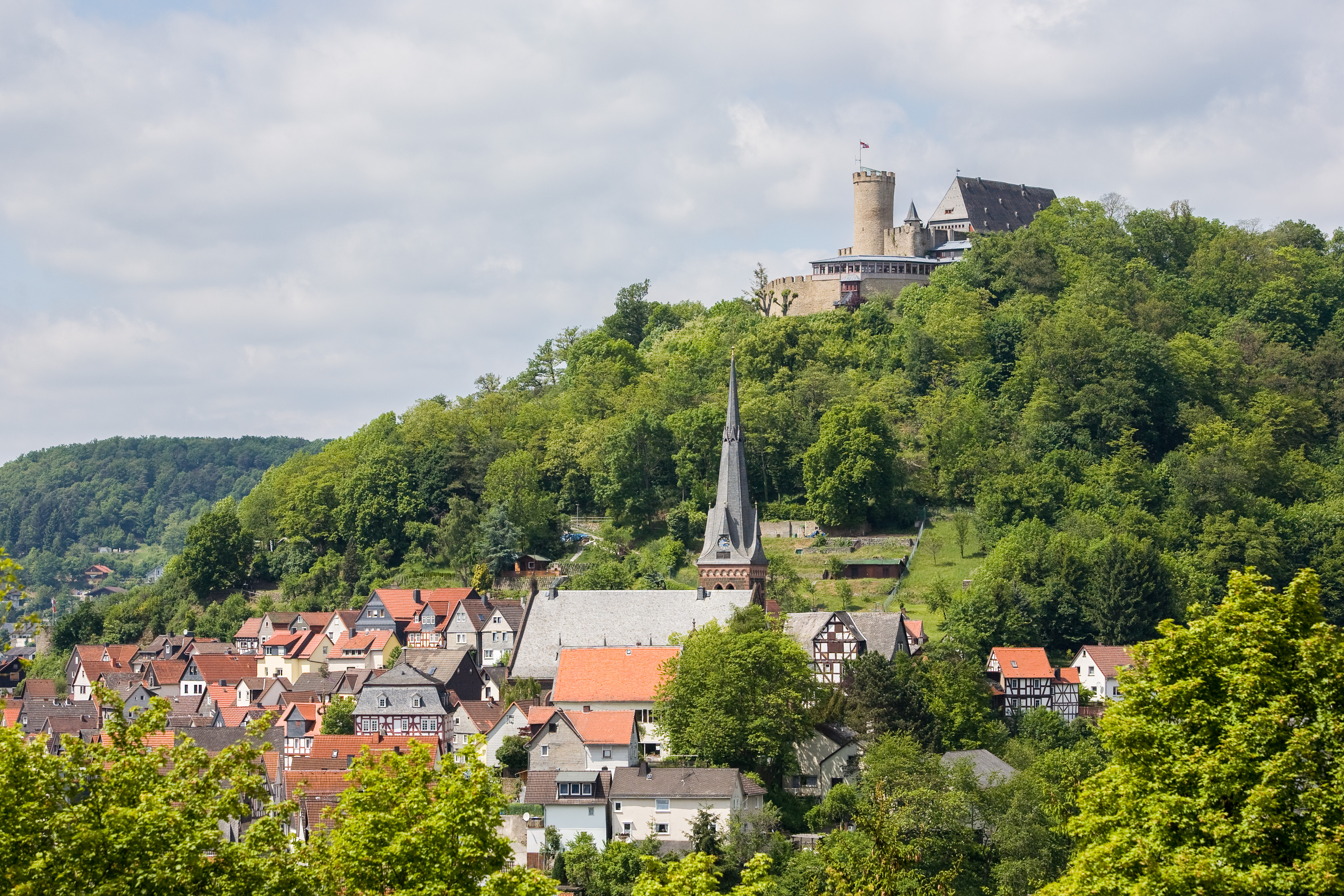
Schloss Biedenkopf

== Christian municipalities ==
- Evangelical-Lutheran congregation of Biedenkopf
- Parish of St. Josef Biedenkopf (Roman Catholic)
- Free Evangelical Congregation of Biedenkopf
- New Apostolic Congregation of Biedenkopf

== Politics ==
=== Town council ===
Biedenkopf's town council consists of 37 seats. At the last election in 2021, the seats were apportioned thus:

- CDU: 7 seats
- SPD: 8 seats
- FDP: 1 seat
- Grüne: 2 seats
- Bürgerblock Biedenkopf: 7 seats
- UBL Wallau: 6 seats
- ZfB: 6 seats

== Town partnerships ==
- La Charité-sur-Loire, France
- Oostduinkerke, Belgium
- Wépion-sur-Meuse, Belgium
- Neustadt an der Orla, Germany
- Cogoleto, Italy
- Kecskéd, Hungary

== Culture and sightseeing ==
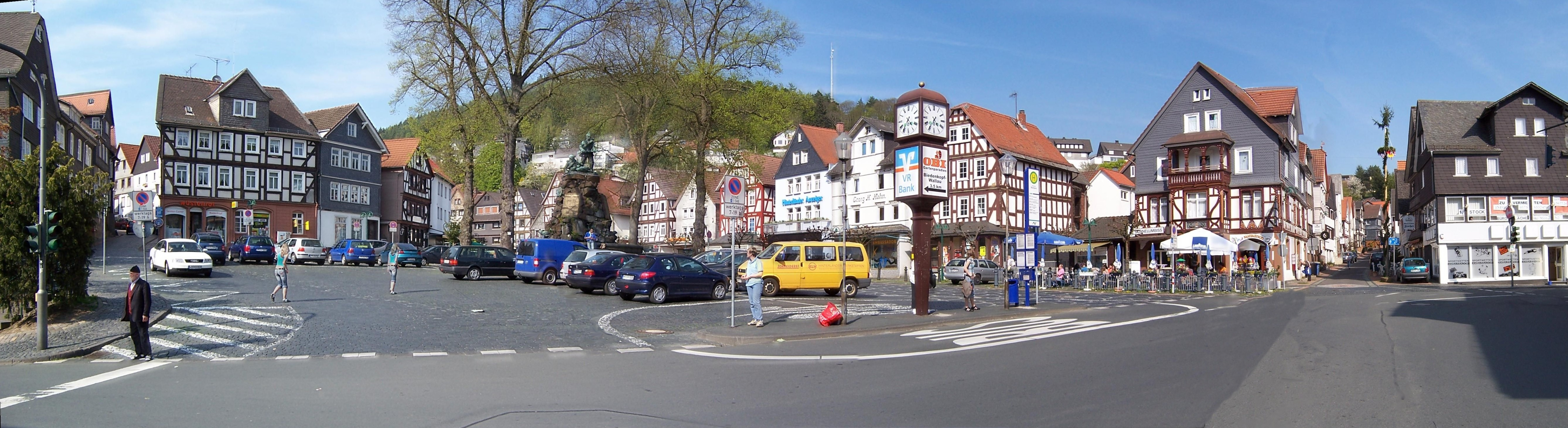
Biedenkopf's marketplace

=== Museums ===
- Schloss Biedenkopf (stately home) with Hinterlandmuseum
- Schartenhof Eckelshausen
- Wallau village museum
- Dorfstube Engelbach
- Private Holder tractor museum in Engelbach
- Schenkbarsches Haus

=== Sport ===
- Indoor swimming pool at the municipality centre
- Lahnauenbad (outdoor swimming pool)
- Indoor and outdoor swimming pool in Wallau municipality
- 4 sports halls in the main municipality (Großsporthalle, Stadtschule, Lahntalschule, Jahn-Halle)
- Großsporthalle (sports hall) in Wallau, gymnasium in Weifenbach
- Aue-Tenniscenter
- Franz-Josef-Müller-Stadion (stadium)
- Sports field in Wallau, football pitches in most municipalities
- Riding hall
- Shooting range
- Trimm-Dich-Pfad ("Trim-Yourself-Path")
- Perfstausee (reservoir) with bathing beach

=== Regular events ===
- Every seven years, the town holds a Grenzgang in which people walk around the borders of the town's forest.

=== Culinary specialities ===
The Kartoffelbraten – or popularly the Brott – is a typical Biedenkopf culinary custom which has grown out of the autumn potato harvest. In many places in the forest, traditionally in early autumn, the tuber is cooked in the cinders of the fire from freshly felled beechwood. The unpeeled potato is sometimes eaten with butter, salt, liverwurst and salad. For the Biedenkopfer Kartoffelbraten, only three kinds of salad are traditionally served: radish salad, onion salad and herring salad.

== Economy and infrastructure ==
=== Planning ===
In the 2001 Middle Hesse Regional Plan, the former district seat (Kreisstadt) Biedenkopf is designated the middle centre in the rural area. The town is part of the Marburg - Dautphetal - Biedenkopf - (Bad Laasphe) development belt. This belt's job is to open up the region, to make possible an exchange of goods and services between middle centres as well as to connect the region to the high centre of Marburg and to the long-distance transportation network. Building on public transport is thus given special importance.

Moreover, there exists a local transport and population belt, Dillenburg - Steffenberg - Breidenbach – Biedenkopf, with a regional connective function. Together with Dautphetal and Breidenbach, Biedenkopf is described as a commercial hub.

=== Transport ===
==== Highways ====
- Bundesstraße 62
- Bundesstraße 253
- Bundesstraße 453

Alongside the two regional buslines 481 (RKH line 5301) and 491 (RKH line 5356), other local buses serve the town.

==== Railway ====
The Obere Lahntalbahn is the only railway line that serves the town. In May 1987, passenger traffic towards Dillenburg on the Scheldetalbahn was discontinued. Minor freight services persisted for a few years serving the Buderus firm until December 2002.

Biedenkopf is joined by the Obere Lahntalbahn (a Deutsche Bahn line) to Erndtebrück in Siegen-Wittgenstein district and the town of Marburg by way of Bad Laasphe, Dautphetal and Lahntal. The railway serves three stations in Biedenkopf: Wallau, Biedenkopf-Schulzentrum and Biedenkopf.

=== Established enterprises ===
In Biedenkopf and its outlying municipalities, machine manufacture and mould making have always been strongly represented. Among the companies in this business are Meissner AG (model- and toolmaking), Banss Schlacht- und Fördertechnik GmbH and CFS (packing systems, formerly Krämer & Grebe Tiromat). Furthermore, processing synthetic products is another of the town's industries, represented by, among others, the firm Elkamet.

=== Media ===
The daily newspaper with the greatest market share in Biedenkopf is the Hinterländer Anzeiger owned by the Lahn-Dill newspaper group (flagship paper: the Wetzlarer Neue Zeitung). A local section can also be found for the old district of Biedenkopf in Marburg's Oberhessische Presse, itself a regional paper.

=== Public institutions ===
- Police station
- Branch of the Marburg-Biedenkopf State Council Office (with vehicle licensing, job centre, folk high school, building and youth office as well as the authority responsible for foreigners)
- Financial office (branch of the Marburg-Biedenkopf financial office)
- Employment agency (branch of the Wetzlar office)
- Kreishandwerkerschaft Biedenkopf (district craftsmen's association)
- Branch of the Dillenburg Industrie- und Handelskammer (IHK, Chamber of Industry and Commerce)
- Medienzentrum Biedenkopf – one of three places in Marburg-Biedenkopf where educational media can be rented
- Pension office of the Biedenkopf Evangelical Deaconate.

Biedenkopf also has a DRK hospital with 110 beds. Alongside surgery, the areas of specialization include gynaecology and obstetrics, internal medicine, and urology.

=== Education ===
- Gymnasium (Lahntalschule Biedenkopf)
- Real- and Hauptschule (Stadtschule Biedenkopf)
- Professional schools
- Biedenkopf primary school
- Primary school and Hauptschule (Mittelpunktschule Wallau)
- Folk high school

== State institutions ==
Since 1953, Biedenkopf has been host to a Hessischer Rundfunk VHF and television transmission facility on the Sackpfeife. The antenna are borne by a 210-m guyed steel-lattice mast with a diagonal cross-section measure of 1.8 m. Its position is 50°57'8"N, 8°32'1"E.

== Personalities ==
=== Sons and daughters of the town ===
- Karl-Heinz Schneider, bearer of the "Verdienstkreuzes am Bande" (bestowed 28 April 2004)
- Wilhelm Henkel, bearer of the "Verdienstkreuzes am Bande" (bestowed 9 January 2004)
- Gretel Henkel, bearer of the "Verdienstmedaille" (bestowed 9 January 2004)
