= Marburg-Biedenkopf =

District in Hesse, Germany

Coordinates: 50°47′10″N 8°46′19″E

- District
- Flag Coat of arms
- Country: Germany
- State: Hesse
- Adm. region: Gießen
- Capital: Marburg

Government
  - District admin.: Jens Womelsdorf (SPD)

Area
  - Total: 1,262.55 km^{2} (487.47 sq mi)

Population (31 December 2024)
  - Total: 242,805
  - Density: 192.313/km^{2} (498.089/sq mi)
- Time zone: UTC+01:00 (CET)
  - Summer (DST): UTC+02:00 (CEST)
- Vehicle registration: MR, BID
- Website: marburg-biedenkopf.de

Marburg-Biedenkopf is a Kreis (district) in the west of Hesse, Germany. Neighboring districts are Waldeck-Frankenberg, Schwalm-Eder, Vogelsbergkreis, Gießen, Lahn-Dill, Siegen-Wittgenstein.

== History ==
The district was created in 1974 when the districts Marburg, Biedenkopf and the former urban district of Marburg were merged.

The district has partnerships with Huntingdonshire in the United Kingdom, the borough of Charlottenburg in Berlin, and the district of Kościerzyna in Poland.

== Geography ==
The main river in the district is the Lahn.

== Coat of arms ==
The coat of arms shows the lion of Hesse, as Marburg was the seat of the landgraves of Hesse, and also their tomb is located in a church in Marburg. The coat held by the lion shows the black cross of the Counts of the Teutonic Knights, who had a castle in Marburg as well.

== Towns and municipalities ==
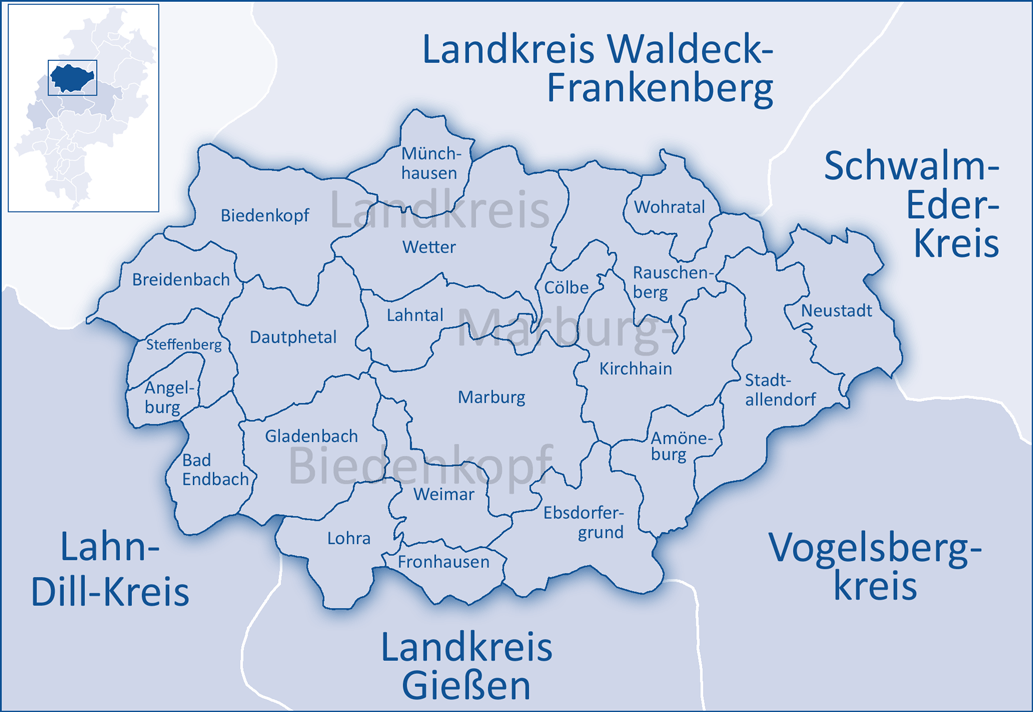
Clickable map of towns and municipalities in the district

Towns
1. Amöneburg
2. Biedenkopf
3. Gladenbach
4. Kirchhain
5. Marburg
6. Neustadt
7. Rauschenberg
8. Stadtallendorf
9. Wetter
Municipalities
1. Angelburg
2. Bad Endbach
3. Breidenbach
4. Cölbe
5. Dautphetal
6. Ebsdorfergrund
7. Fronhausen

8. Lahntal
9. Lohra
10. Münchhausen am Christenberg
11. Steffenberg
12. Weimar
13. Wohratal
