= Germania Antiqua =

Short-lived Roman province

Germania Antiqua Provincia Germania
- Province of the Roman Empire
- 7 BC–AD 9
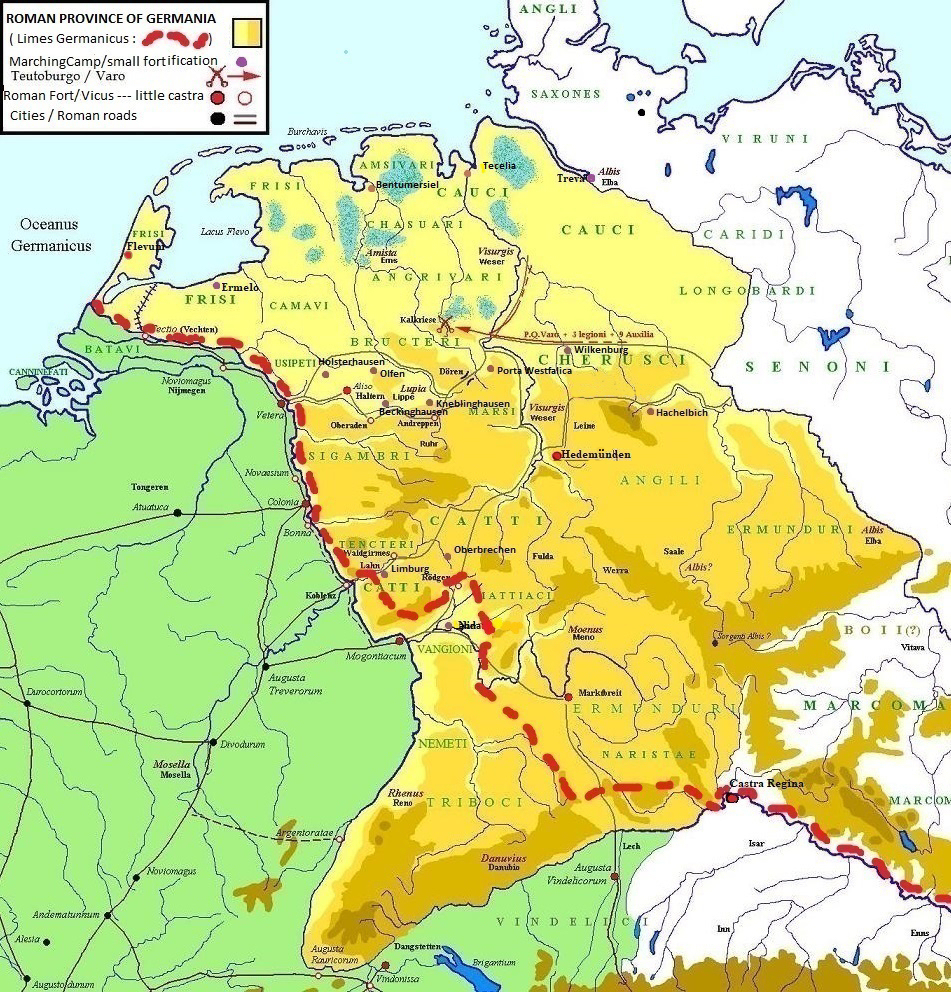
- The Roman province of Germania (marked in yellow)
- Capital: Marktbreit?
- Historical era: Antiquity
  - Established: 7 BC
  - Disestablished: AD 9
- Today part of: Germany; Netherlands; Switzerland

Germania (also sometimes called Germania Antiqua by Theodore Mommsen and other historians) was a short-lived Roman province for the duration of 16 years under Augustus, from 7 BC to AD 9. The possible capital of this province was Marktbreit (German: Römerlager Marktbreit), a castrum (Roman legionary fortification) with a nearby canaba (Roman vicus) from the period of Emperor Augustus, located 70 km east of the "Limes Germanicus" on the River Main.

== History ==
The Romans under Augustus began to conquer and defeat the peoples of Germania Magna in 12 BC, having the legati (generals) Drusus and Tiberius leading the legions. By AD 6, all of Germania up to the River Elbe was temporarily pacified by the Romans as well as being occupied by them, with Publius Quinctilius Varus being (unofficially) appointed as Germania's governor.

In 12 BC Nero Claudius Drusus "the elder" crossed the Rhenus to establish Roman control. Many of the Germanic tribes were conquered and by 9 BC he had pushed the border of northern Roman Germania to the Albis (Elbe). Drusus died later that year and was replaced by his brother Tiberius. Tiberius fought a number of smaller wars and eventually left Germania in the hands of various legates who had established friendly relations among the Germans. Augustus, satisfied with the accomplishments of both Drusus and Tiberius, pushed to make Germania Magna (between the Rhenus and Albis) a province of the Roman Empire. The Romans, however, had overestimated their position and found the tribes unwilling to accept the offer of provincial status. In 9 AD under the command of Publius Quinctilius Varus the Romans were caught in a surprise attack while marching through the Teutoburg Forest. The Cherusci tribe, under Arminius (Hermann) destroyed 3 full Legions, the XVII, XVIII, and XIX, resulting in the death of 20,000 Legionaries.

However, the Roman plan to complete the conquest and incorporate all of Magna Germania into the Roman Empire was frustrated when three Roman legions under the command of Varus were annihilated by the German tribesmen in the Battle of the Teutoburg Forest in AD 9. Augustus then ordered Roman withdrawal from Magna Germania (completed by AD 16) and established the boundary of the Roman Empire as being the Rhine and the Danube.

Under Emperors Vespasian and Domitian, the Roman Empire occupied the region known as the Agri Decumates between the Main, Danube, and Rhine rivers. The region soon became a vital part of the Limes Germanicus with dozens of Roman forts. The Agri Decumates were finally abandoned to the Germanic Alemanni, after the Emperor Probus' death (282). Some parts of the earlier province were incorporated into either Germania Inferior or Germania Superior in AD 85.

Main Roman "castrum" in the area of present-day Germany and the Netherlands

In Tacitus, Germania Antiqua or Germania Barbara, are synonyms of Germania Transrhenana, also Germania Magna, i.e., the part of Germania on the right side of the Rhine.

The removal of Germanicus -because of Tiberius' political fears - was the end of the Roman tentative to dominate German territories until the Elbe river and to create the Province of Germania: only a few decades later Roman legions crossed again the Rhine river, but this time it was only in order to occupy the southern German region called Agri Decumates.

With emperor Claudius the main area of Roman conquests in western Europe shifted to Britain and only defensive actions with some raids were done in Magna Germania during the next centuries.

== Roman fortifications and settlements ==
In the Roman province of Germania there were at least three civilian settlements (the possible capital Aliso, with Marktbreit and Waldgirmes) and some legionary camps & fortifications. Someone of them recently discovered:

Area name	Actual name	From	until	Discovered	kind	Comment	Photo/Map
Aliso (camp and vicus)	Haltern am See	from 7 BC	to 9 AD	1816	fortifications and important civilian settlement	near Lippe	
Bentumersiel (Roman camp)	Landkreis Leer	from 12 BC	to 16 AD	1928	Camp/port station of Classis Germanica	near Ems	
Marktbreit	Marktbreit	from 6 BC	to 9 AD	1985	Huge Legionary camp and fort; later civilian settlement	near river Main	
Nida	Heddernheim	from ca. 5 BC	to 275 AD	1895	Roman castrum and later vicus	near river Main	
Treva	Hamburg	from 10 BC	to 16 AD (later as Hammaburg)		possible marching camp and commercial port	near Elbe river	
Waldgirmes	Lahnau-Dorlar	from 4 BC	to 16 AD	1990-1997	Roman Fort and later civilian settlement	near river Lahn in Hesse	
Hachelbich camp	Hachelbich, Thuringia	from 10 BC	to 218 AD	2009	Roman Fort and vicus	near Mansfeld	
Roman camp, Wilkenburg	Hemmingen	from 12 BC	to 9 AD	(1992 aerial photo-2015 archaeological discovery	Roman camp for 20.000 legionaries	Hannover area	

== Agri Decumates ==
The Agri Decumates were the only areas of the short-lived Roman province of Germania, that successively -after the Augustus order to withdraw west of the Rhine river- remained inside the Roman Empire.

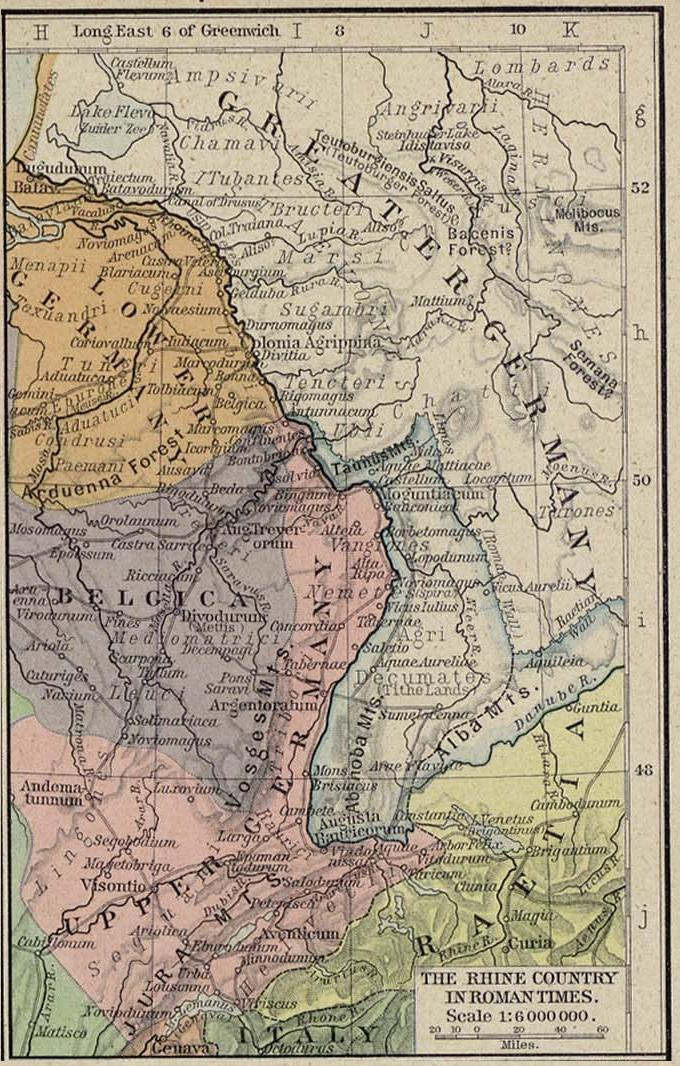
Agri Decumates (in blue color)

Even if reconquered temporarily by Germanicus in 14 AD and two years later abandoned, under the Flavian emperors Romans took control and settled again this region: the Agri Decumates were part of the Germania Superior province since 85 AD. The legionaries built a road network for military communications and movements, and improved protection from invading German tribes (who used the re-entrant region to penetrate into Roman Gaul provinces). Frontier fortifications (Limes) were constructed along a line running Rheinbrohl—Arnsburg—Inheiden—Schierenhof—Gunzenhausen—Pförring (called Limes Germanicus).

The larger Roman settlements in the Agri Decumates were Sumolecenna (Rottenburg am Neckar), Civitas Aurelia Aquensis (Baden-Baden), Lopodunum (Ladenburg) and Arae Flaviae (Rottweil).

Romans controlled the Agri Decumates region until the mid-3rd century, when the emperor Gallienus (259-260 AD) evacuated it before the invading Alemanni. Later the emperor Aurelian (270-275 AD) had the region briefly reoccupied during the Roman resurgence of the late 3rd century under the so-called "military" emperors.

== See also ==
- Germani cisrhenani
- Germanic peoples
- Germania Inferior
- Germania Superior
- Aliso
- Waldgirmes
- Marktbreit
- Hachelbich camp
- Agri Decumates
- Germanic Wars

== Bibliography ==
- Carroll, Maureen. Romans, Celts & Germans: the german provinces of Rome. Tempus Series. Publisher Tempus, 2001 ISBN 0752419129
- Lintott, Andrew. The Cambridge Ancient History: X, The Augustan Empire; 43 B.C. – A.D. 69. 10 (2nd ed.). Cambridge University Press. pp. 526–528. Cambridge, 1996 ISBN 0-521-26430-8.
- Mommsen, Theodore. The Provinces of the Roman Empire. Editor Scribner. New York, 1906
- Zick, Michael. Rom an der Lahn. In: Abenteuer Archäologie 2006, 1, S. 46ff. ISSN 1612-9954 (online)
