= Treva =

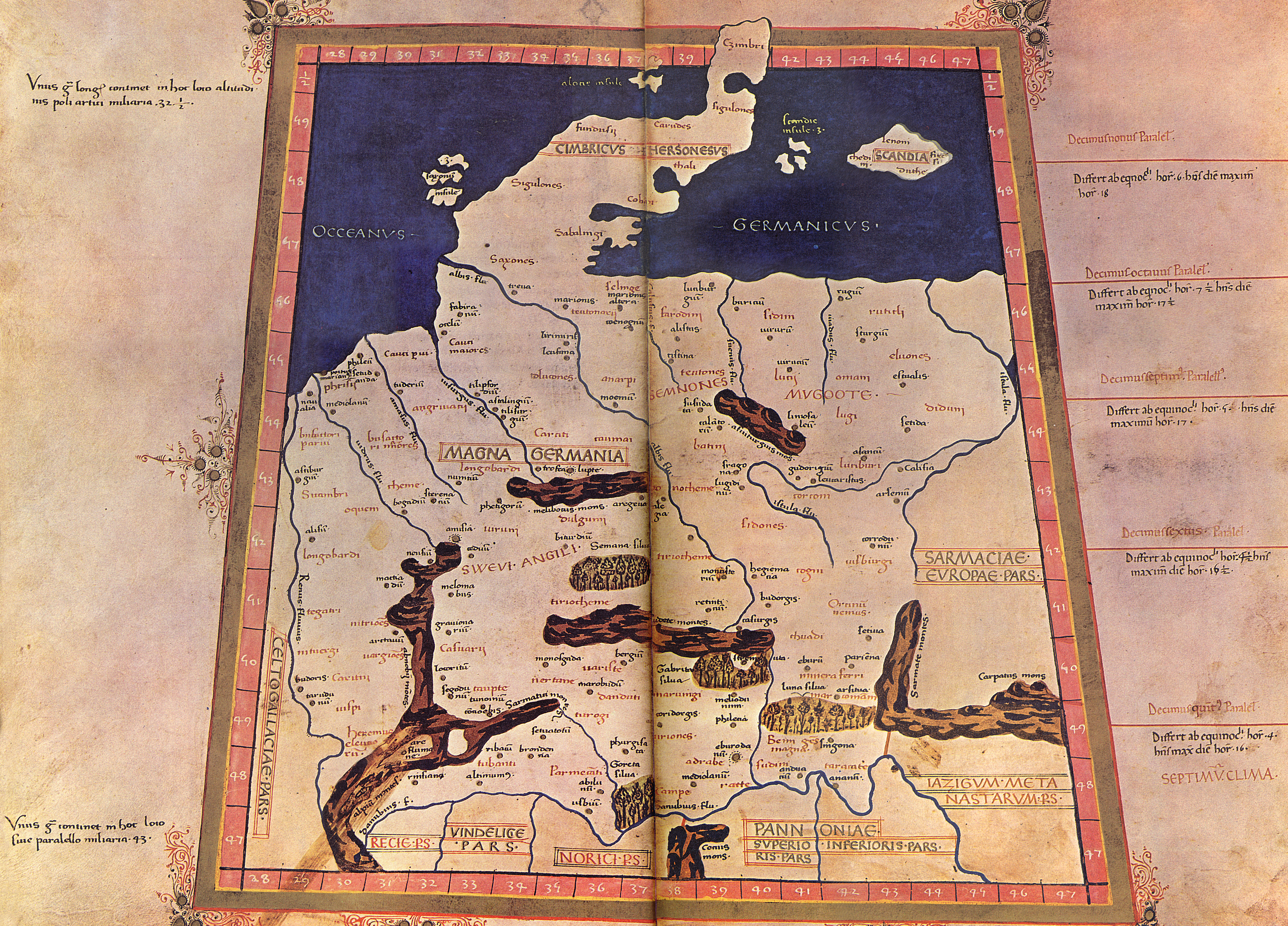
- Ptolemy's map of Magna Germania from the early 2nd century. Treva appears in the middle of the northwest quadrant, just north of the river Elbe, and south of the tribal region labelled "Saxones".

Treva is the historical name of a settlement during the short-lived creation of the Roman province of Germania, at the site of the modern city of Hamburg in Germany.

== History ==
The Romans reached the Elbe river under Augustus and conquered all the German territories west of this river.

Some evidence indicates that they built a "marching camp" in a small island in the estuary of the river Elbe, in a place where their ships could arrive (and be protected by a small port) when sailing from Flevum - a Roman port near the Rhine river.

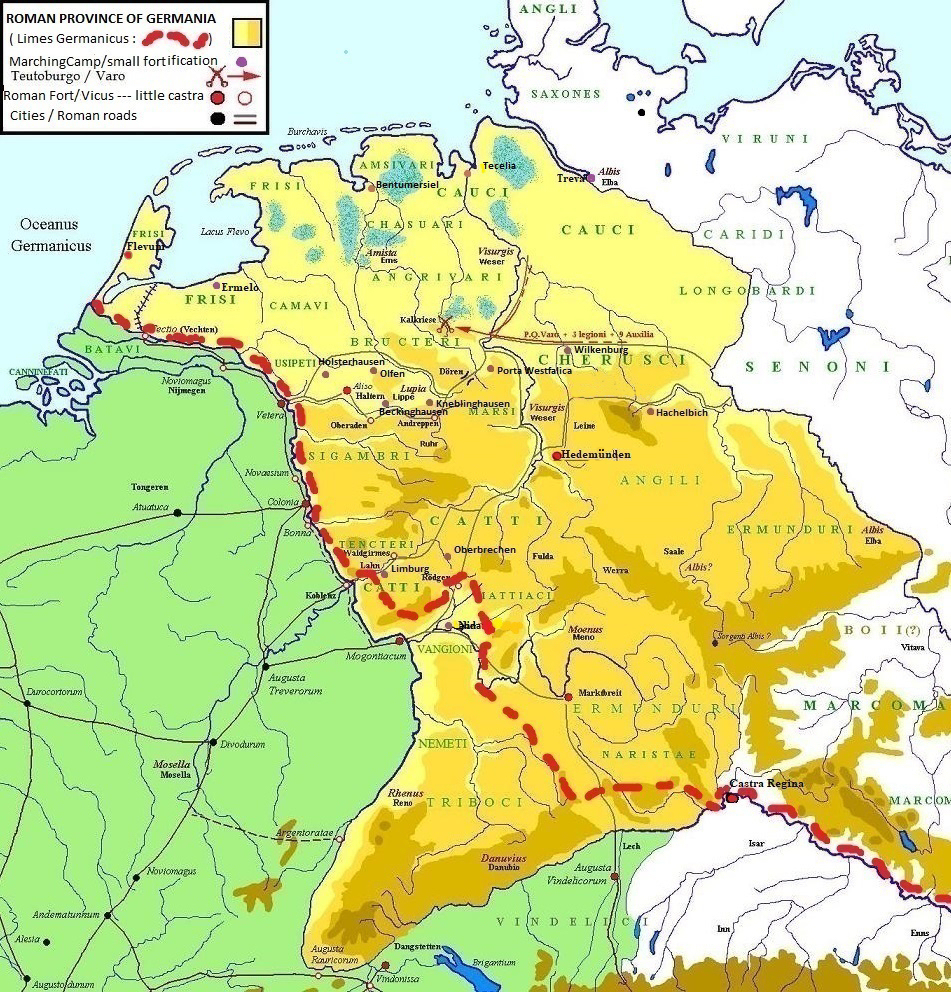
Map of the Roman province of Germania showing Treva

This place was called "Treva" (and also "Treuvam") and later probably had a small vicus populated by local Germans with some Roman merchants. The origin of the name is similar to the Latin name of Trier: tre from Latin "trans" (through) and va from Germanic "var" (river).

Indeed Lucius Domitius Ahenobarbus (the successor of Tiberius in Germania) commanded the Roman army to the area of Treva and crossed the Elbe around 4 BC, during which he set up an altar to Augustus (probably in the western area of Brandenburg). His campaign followed the one with the creation by Drusus of small fortifications (one could have been "Treva", but there it is no archaeological discovery about) along the rivers Weser and Elbe, done some years before.

"Praeterea in tutelam provinciae praesidia atque custodias obique (Drusus) disposuit per Mosam flumen, per Albin, per Visurgim" (in order to defend and control the Germania province, Drusus established forts along the river Meuse, Elbe, Weser). Florus, "Epitomae" of Roman History

So, after Drusus, Ahenobarbus penetrated further into the country than any of his predecessors had done.

Furthermore, the future emperor Tiberius campaigned extensively while in Germany, even conducting some amphibious operations along the Elbe River in 5 AD and certainly landing also in the surroundings of Treva.

The events surrounding the encounter between Tiberius's army and fleet on the Elbe have been handed down to us in a comparatively detailed report. A Roman named Velleius Paterculus, who also worked as a historian, was present as a cavalry officer in Tiberius's retinue and thus an eyewitness. This is a rare stroke of luck, because historians in antiquity often lived decades or even centuries after the events they wrote about......Unfortunately, Paterculus did not provide any further information about the location of the encounter. Only the fact that the Romans had set up a camp on the "this side", or from their perspective, the southern bank of the Elbe, is an interesting detail. Researchers disagree on the location of this camp and the meetings described above. Artlenburg or Boizenburg, where old roads from the south met the Elbe and there were river crossings, would be suitable locations very close to present-day Hamburg. It is also possible, however, that the Roman camp was located in the Harburg area and thus already within the present-day city limits of Hamburg. Because the river's course splits into several branches and the Elbe islands, which were much more numerous at the time, there were certainly several convenient moorings for Roman ships here. Perhaps they even sailed a short distance up the Bille or the Alster for exploration.H.G.

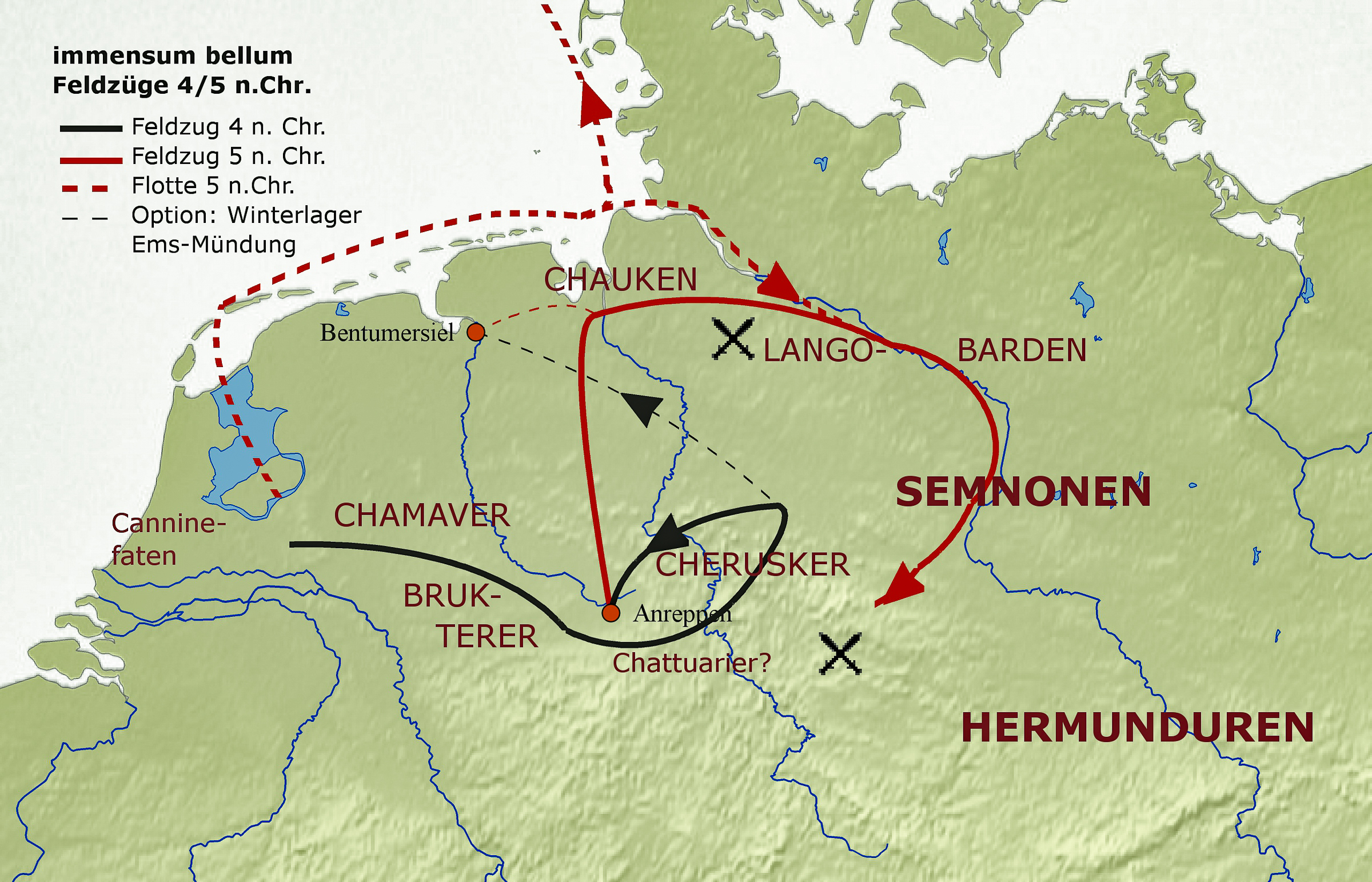
Map showing the Tiberius campaigns in 5 AD along the Elbe River

We have the description of these landings from one of his officers, named Velleius Paterculus, but it is not precise (even because of the many Elbe changes -of the river's course splits- into several branches during the following centuries).

Later, Germanicus in 15 AD reached Treva and again crossed the Elbe river in his military campaign, before the final withdrawal of the Romans west of the Rhine river.

Claudius Ptolemy (2nd century AD) reported the first name for the vicinity as Treva. He also indicated that Treva was at the intersection of ancient commercial routes that have been used, among other things, for transporting the then very valuable amber.

The actual name Hamburg comes from the first permanent building on the site, a castle which the Emperor Charlemagne ordered constructed in 808 AD. It rose on rocky terrain in a marsh between the River Alster and the River Elbe as a defence against Slavic incursion, and acquired the name Hammaburg (burg meaning castle or fort and hamma marshes in old German language). Nothing remained of the castle, St. Mary cathedral was built on this site (14th and 15th century), demolished in 1807.

The Hammaburg, conveniently situated on the river Alster, Elbe and Bille, was from the beginning a trading place...the original Hamburgers were traders....The wooden burgeon sheltered by a moat and palisades lay on a land that was surrounded north, west, and south of the meandering Alster...In the 1980s, a "double circuit" was found, the remains of an early medieval fortification. Until now it had been assumed that it dates back to the 6th century or earlier (some even spoke of stone age).Die Welt

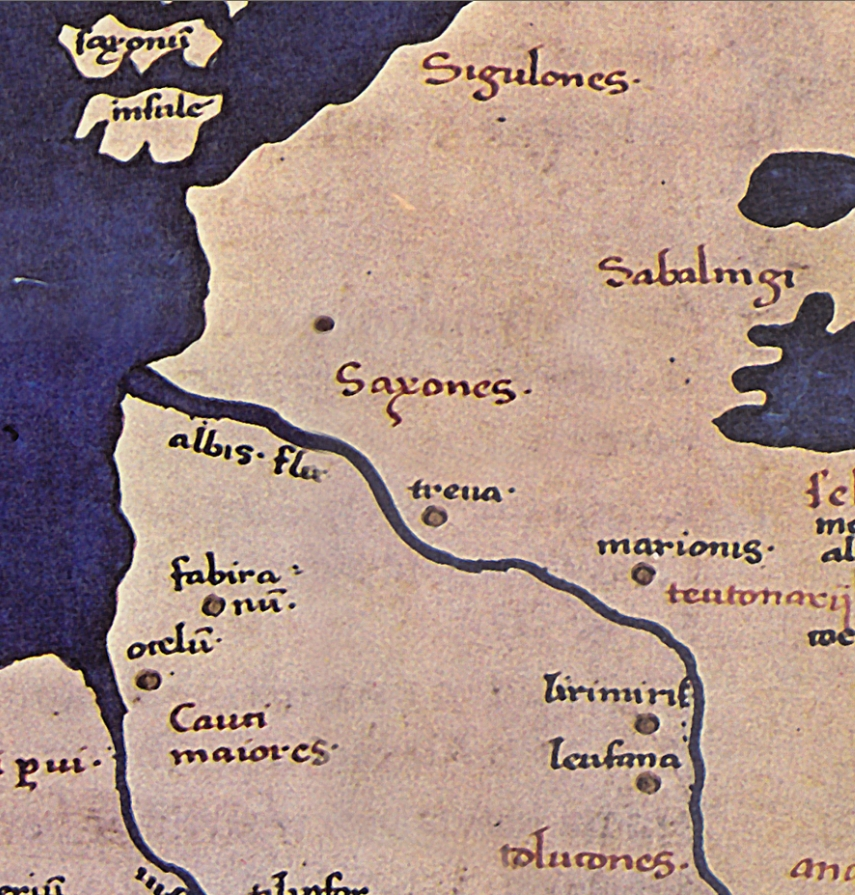
Treva shown on ancient map

Recent archaeological discoveries in the center of Hamburg have proved the existence of a trade settlement during Roman times. Furthermore, some gold Roman coins have been discovered in Lokstedt (a section of Hamburg).

== See also ==
- Germania
- Germania Antiqua
- Flevum
- Marktbreit

== Bibliography ==
- Doyle, Nolan. The Pannonian Revolt, Teutoburg Forest and the Formation of Roman Frontiers. Senior Seminar: HST 499 Professor B.H.Hshieh. Western Oregon University June 15, 2007 ()
- F. Langewiesche: Germanische Siedlungen im nordwestlichen Deutschland zwischen Rhein und Weser nach dem Berichte des Ptolemäus. Beilage zum Jahresbericht des Realprogymnasiums zu Bünde über das Schuljahr 1909/10.
- Kleineberg Andrea, Christian Marx, Eberhard Knobloch und Dieter Lelgemann (Hrsg.): Germania und die Insel Thule. Die Entschlüsselung von Ptolemaios’ Atlas der Oikumene, S. 29. Wissenschaftliche Buchgesellschaft, Darmstadt 2010, ISBN 978-3-534-23757-9.
- J.-M.A.W.Morel. The early roman harbours. Velsen, in: R.W.Brandt, W.Groenman-van Waateringe & S.E.van der Leeuw (eds.), Assendelver Polder Papers 1, Amsterdam 1987, pags. 169–175.
- Powell, Lindsay (2011). Eager for Glory: The Untold Story of Drusus the Elder, Conqueror of Germania. Barnsley, South Yorkshire: Pen & Sword Books. ISBN 978-1-84884-333-2.
- Tacitus. Annals (Tacitus, Annals, I–VI, English translation)
