= Roman camp, Marktbreit =

Archaeological site in Germany

Coordinates: 49°40′11.8″N 10°9′18.2″E

Roman camp Marktbreit
- Marktbreit Castrum
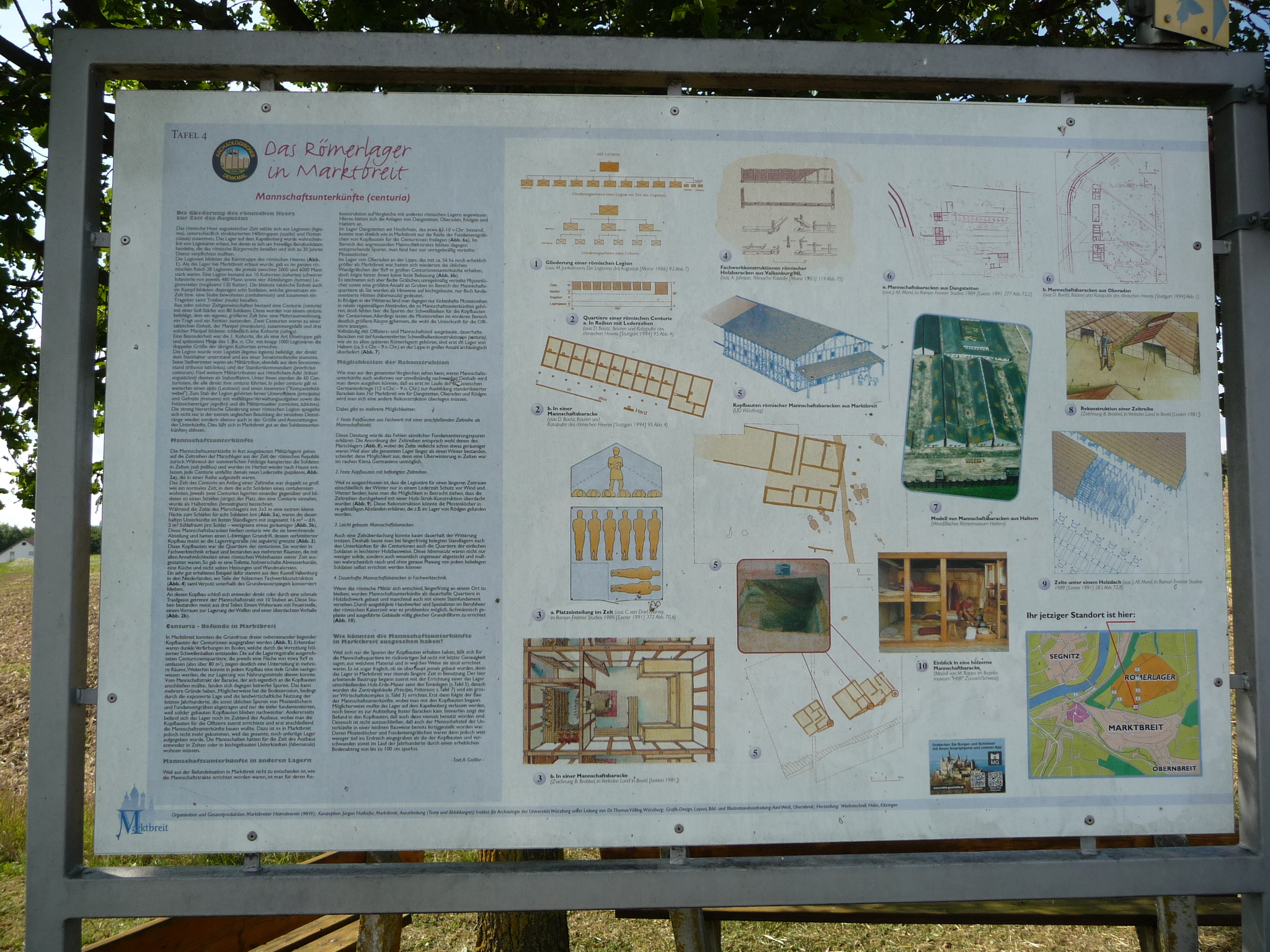
- Info board at the former site of the castrum

- Location within Germany
- Location: Marktbreit, Bavaria, Germany

History
- Founded: ca. 4 AD
- Built: Augustus
- Abandoned: ca. 9 AD

The Roman camp at Marktbreit (German: Römerlager Marktbreit) is a castrum (Roman legionary fortification) with a nearby canabae from the period of Emperor Augustus. It is located in the municipal territory of the Lower Franconian town of Marktbreit on the left bank of the River Main, in the district of Kitzingen inside the German state of Bavaria.

It is remarkable because until 1985 it was never suspected that a legionary fortress was built by the Romans so far east in Germanic enemy territory.

== Location and history ==
The historic monument is located at a strategic site northeast of the actual town on the hill of Kapellenberg, a terrain spur in the acute angle between the Main (Moenus) and the Breitbach stream. Due to the course it follows in this area, the Main forms the so-called Main Triangle. In antiquity there was almost certainly a ford here.

Archaeologists have established that east of the modern town Marktbreit am Main, 140 km east of the Rhine, a large base was built on a hilltop. Probably, the First and Fifth were supposed to stay here before the final attack was to begin; and once the conquest of Germania had been finished, it could serve as a civil settlement, perhaps the capital of southern Germania. Livius: Marktbreit

From this early period, the Marktbreit camp is the only one so far discovered that is located on the Main. It is also the farthest east for its period as well as one of the largest in Magna Germania overall. Archaeological finds show that there had once been a settlement of the Hallstatt culture on the site. In addition, a grave has been found that is associated with the Corded Ware culture.

The castrum was probably used again by Germanicus in 15 AD, according to interpretations of Cornelius Tacitus:

Starting from the small Roman auxiliary camp at Frankfurt‐Höchst on the Main which was occupied with Germanic auxiliaries and dates from the turn of the millennium, the 275 km river route to Marktbreit could have been reached in approximately three days by ship. As attested to by numerous reconstructions of Roman ships and experimental journeys on small and large rivers of central Europe, such ships could cover more than an impressive 100 km per day. Armin Volkmann

== Discovery and historical significance ==
The camp was discovered in 1985 by aerial archaeologist Otto Braasch. Sondages and especially magnetometer research during the investigations in the period 1986 to 1993 by the Bavarian State Office for Monument Protection in Würzburg revealed an older, smaller camp, roughly nine hectares in area, and a larger, more recent camp, roughly 37 hectares in size. Of the smaller camp, only the ditch has survived. Of the larger one, there are a 2.8-metre-wide earth and wood wall and remains of the interior buildings.

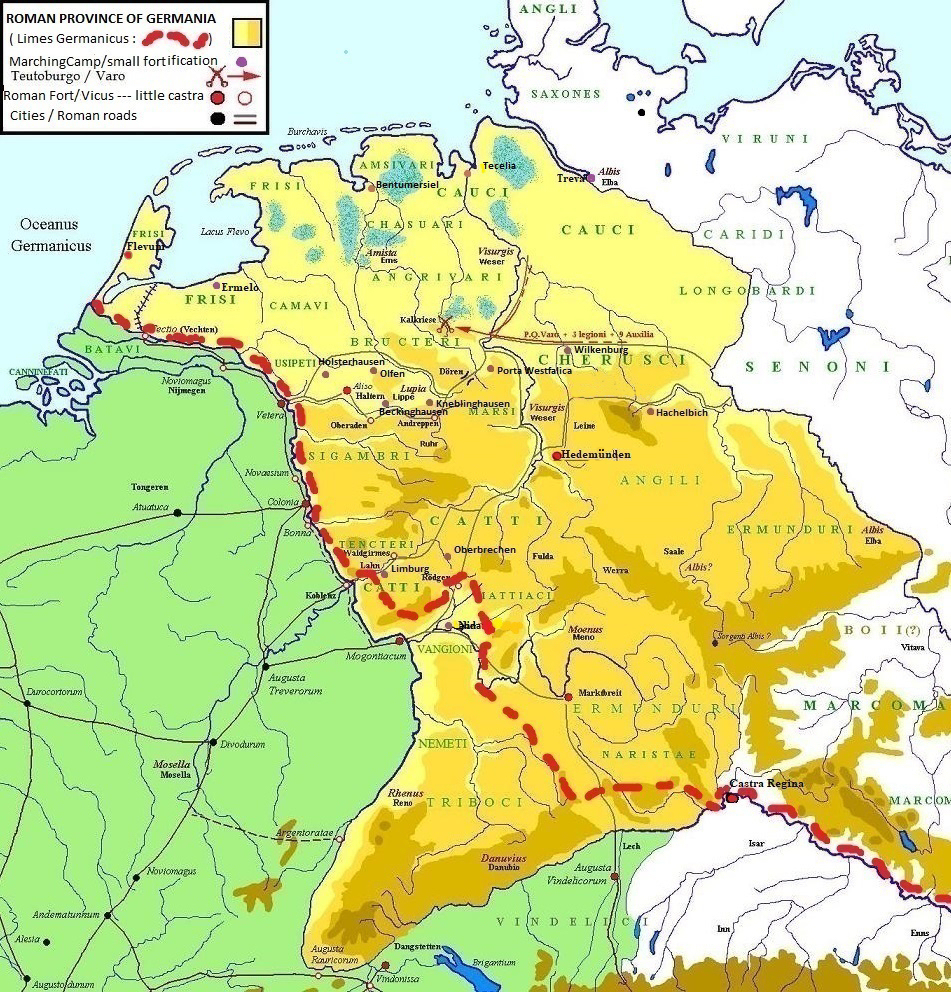
Map of the Roman province of Germania showing Marktbreit

An important architectonic feature is a praetorium (commandant's residence) oriented axially and joined to the huge principia (staff building). Such a central staff building is also found in the Roman camp at Aliso/Haltern. Along with the irregular ground plan and the design of the gate areas, this detail enables it to be dated to the time of Augustus. Six Roman coins and a terra sigillata stamp give a more precise date of 4 to 9 AD. In addition, soldiers' accommodation blocks (contubernia), defences and gate systems have been investigated.

The time horizon should enable its historical situation to be well classified to the short-lived creation of the Germania Superior, which existed between 4 AD and 9 AD.

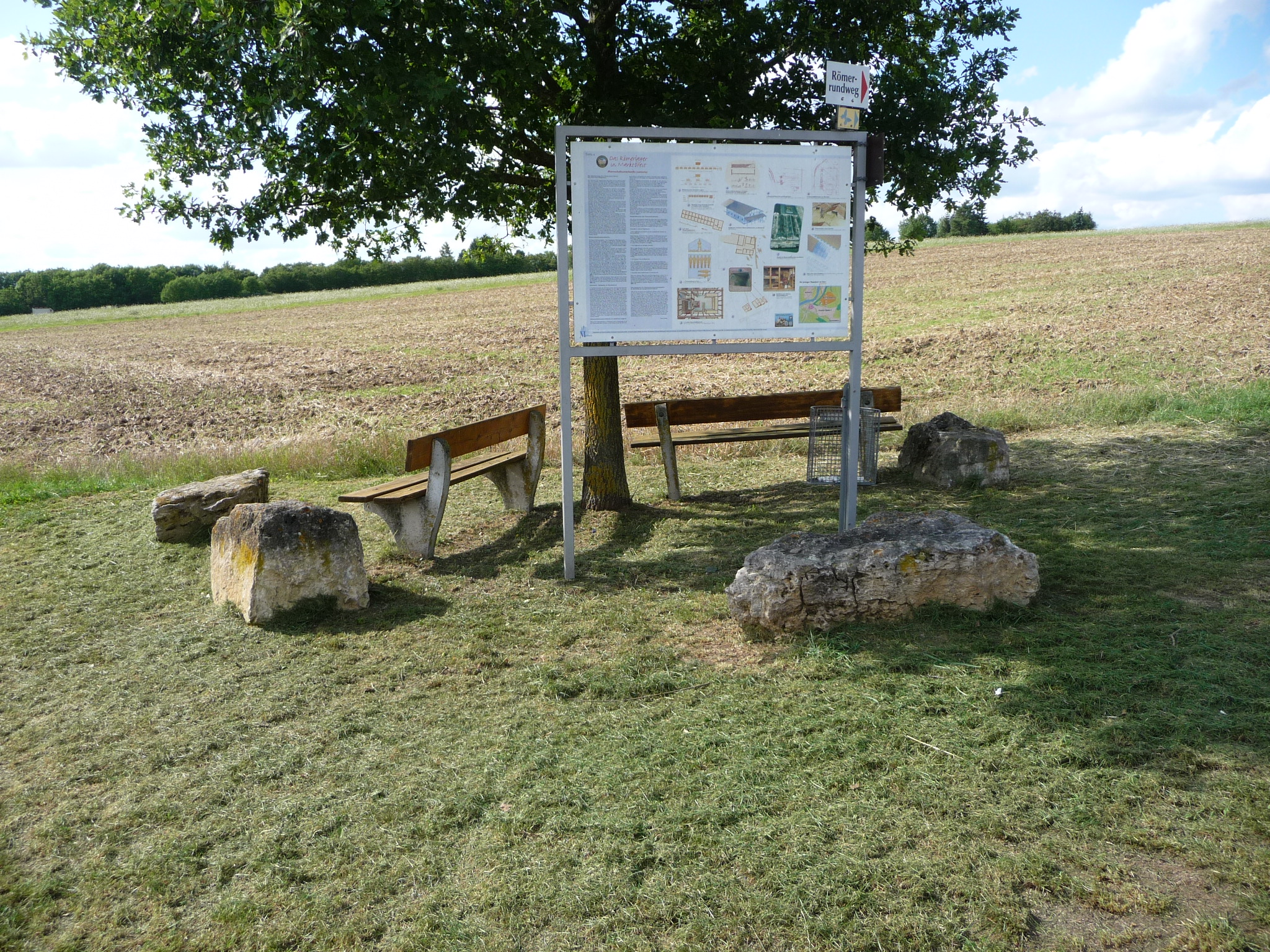
Actual site of Marktbreit Roman fortifications

The camp at Marktbreit fits into this scenario, perhaps not so much as a transit fortification with a small core staff to protect the deployment and supplies during the campaign but, in view of its size and the representative buildings, as a planned centre for large-scale conquest. That does not explain the extreme paucity of archaeological finds, however.

Whether its expansion was ever completely finished is not yet clear, but the large building would certainly have made an impression on the local population. In any case, after the campaign had been called off, the fortification was no longer needed and was destroyed by fire.

== Civilian settlement ==
Not far from the camp and in the top of a small hill, a civilian settlement was established (canabae legionis) to support the camp. This place of 9 hectares had a population of nearly 3000, mostly civilians (many were craftsmen with their families).

It seems to have been a vicus, which under Germanicus survived until 16 AD and probably later. Indeed, the influence of Roman culture on agriculture and crafts in the surrounding area during that century has been demonstrated by archaeology.

Some academics pinpoint that Marktbreit could have been the possible capital of the Germania Antiqua (a province of the Roman empire that Augustus wanted to create, before the defeat at the Teutoburg forest battle).

== Conservation ==
The area of the camp is a protected monument under the Bavarian Monument Conservation Act of Bavaria. Research and the deliberate acquisition of finds must be approved. Accidental finds must be reported to the monument authorities. Artefacts are displayed inter alia in the Roman Cabinet at the Malerwinkelhaus at Bachgasse 2 in Marktbreit.

Furthermore, there is an archaeological hiking trail with eight information boards from the car park on the Main to the Kapellenberg, which gives an idea of the vast scale of Marktbreit's military camp.

== Literature ==
- Martin Pietsch, Dieter Timpe, Ludwig Wamser: Das augusteische Truppenlager Marktbreit. Bisherige archäologische Befunde und historische Erwägungen. In: Bericht der Römisch-Germanischen Kommission 72, 1991, pp. 263–324.
- Martin Pietsch: Die Zentralgebäude des augusteischen Legionslagers von Marktbreit und die Principia von Haltern. In: Germania 71, 1993, pp. 355–368.
- Axel Posluschny, Die hallstattzeitliche Siedlung auf dem Kapellenberg bei Marktbreit, Unterfranken. Bayerische Vorgeschichtsblätter. 62, 1997, pp. 29–113.
- Siegmar von Schnurbein: Die augusteischen Stützpunkte in Mainfranken und Hessen. In: Ludwig Wamser (ed.): Die Römer zwischen Alpen und Nordmeer. Zivilisatorisches Erbe einer europäischen Militärmacht. Katalog-Handbuch zur Landesausstellung des Freistaates Bayern, Rosenheim 2000. von Zabern, Mainz, 2000. (= Schriftenreihe der Archäologischen Staatssammlung 1), ISBN 3-8053-2615-7 und ISBN 3-927806-24-2, pp. 34–37 with ground plan.
- Volkmann, Armin. Perspectives for Network Analysis: Roman roads, Barbarian paths and settlement patterns in the borderlands at the Limes Germanicus in the Main River region De Gruyter Editor. "European Association of Archaeologists Conference". Glasgow, 2015
- Ludwig Wamser: Legionslager Marktbreit. Marktbreit, Lkr. Kitzingen. In: Ders. (publ.): Die Römer zwischen Alpen und Nordmeer. Zivilisatorisches Erbe einer europäischen Militärmacht. Katalog-Handbuch zur Landesausstellung des Freistaates Bayern, Rosenheim 2000. von Zabern, Mainz, 2000. (= Schriftenreihe der Archäologischen Staatssammlung 1), ISBN 3-8053-2615-7 und ISBN 3-927806-24-2, Cat. No. 250 pp. 436–438 with illustrations of real and virtual models.
