= Bentumersiel =

Archaeological site in Lower Saxony, Germany

Coordinates: 53.2463°N 7.3912°E

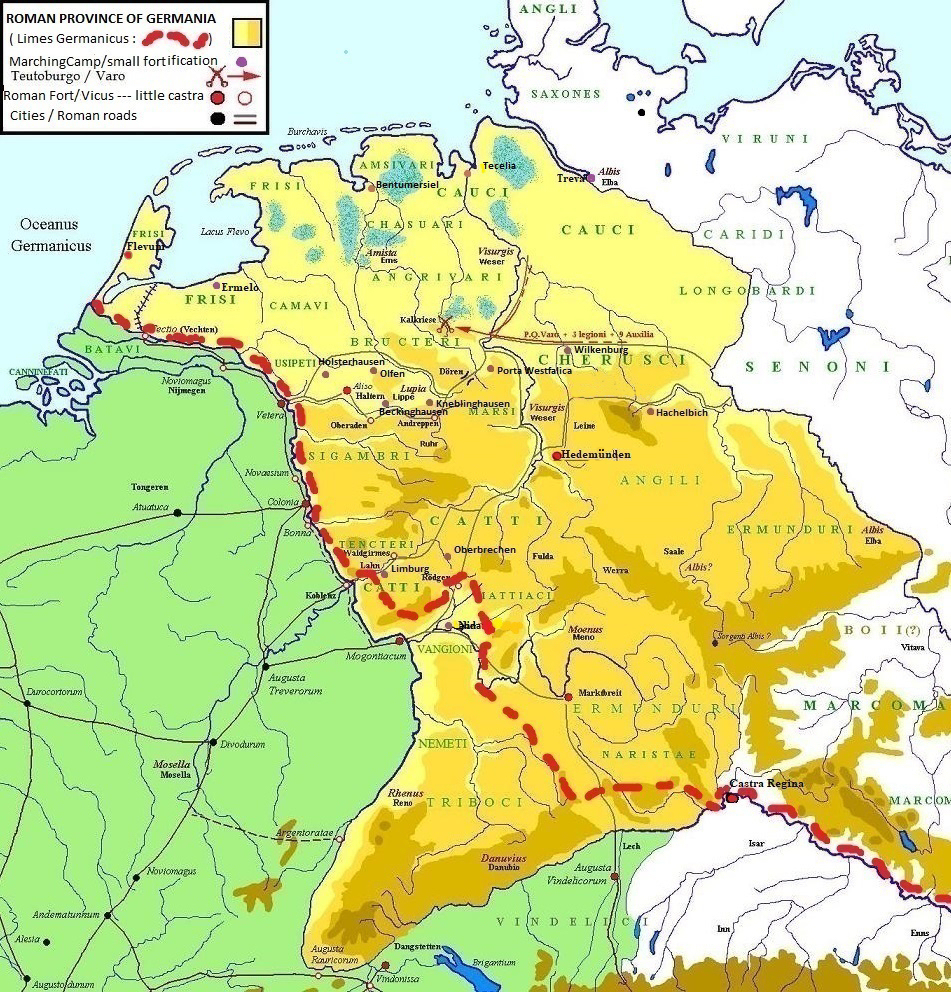
Map of the Roman province of Germania, showing Bentumersiel

Bentumersiel was a Roman fortification in northern Germany (then called Germania Antiqua).

== History ==
In Lower Saxony, archaeological finds indicate the presence of Roman legionnaires at the beginning of the 1st century AD only in very few places. Bentumersiel, located in the river marsh of the Reiderland on the lower Ems, is one of these sites.

In addition to the typical native Germanic pottery, the find material recovered there also consists of numerous objects of Roman provenance. In addition to some elements of the legionnaires' equipment made of metal, these include shards of Roman amphorae or Roman heavy ceramics. The majority of these finds can be linked to the campaigns of Germanicus in 15/16 AD in the area east of the river due to their dating to the early 1st century AD. According to Tacitus' report, the Roman fleet remained behind on the lower reaches of the Ems for the duration of the campaigns.

The buildings in the Bentumersiel settlement also do not correspond to the usual image of a Germanic marsh settlement of the Roman Empire. In the course of its existence, it has not been raised by a wurt to protect against water, nor have the few houses excavated so far had a stable.

The settlement of Bentumersiel was founded as early as the middle pre-Roman Iron Age and existed at least until the 3rd or 4th century AD. The current status of the excavation shows that the farms of the settlement with houses and granaries extended over an area of at least 1.3 ha. Especially to the north, there is no known limit to the settlement so far.

The unusual composition of the finds and the building structure led to the assumption as early as the 1970s, that the Bentumersiel settlement was only used seasonally as a stacking and trading place. In comparison with similar riverside squares such as the Elsfleth-Hogenkamp settlement in the Weser-marsch district, the function of Bentumersiel is now to be clarified as a support fortification.

According to one writer, "Finds of pottery and a small assemblage of bronze objects displaying Celtic influences suggest that the settlement had been established as early as the 2nd century BC. Based on current evidence it continued into the 4th century AD."

A Bentumersiel vicus settlement, populated by "romanised" Germans, on the river Ems remained active with some commerce until at least the fifth century, when the first German invasions of the Western Roman Empire started.

== Recent excavations ==
Some Roman bricks were found in the area in the XIX century, as well as some imported ceramics dating back to the Augustan period. In 1929, the first archaeological exploration of the site took place. A new and important excavation campaign began in the post-war period between 1971 and 1973 thanks to the Historical Institute for Coastal Research of Lower Saxony.

Recent excavations conducted in 2006 have led to the recovery not only of materials typical of the Germanic populations, but also of ceramics of Roman origin such as amphorae and metal objects typical of the equipment of the Roman legionaries.

== See also ==
- Germania Antiqua
- Aliso (Roman camp)

== Bibliography ==
- Brandt, K., 1977: "Die Ergebnisse der Grabung in der Marschsiedlung Bentumersiel/Unterems" in den Jahren 1971–1973. Probleme der Küstenforschung im südlichen Nordseegebiet 12, 1-32.
- Strahl, E. Reiderland. In: J. Hoops (Begr.), "Reallexikon der Germanischen Altertumskunde" 24, 348-361. 2nd ed. Berlin, New York, 2003
