= Horse's head of Waldgirmes =

Ancient Roman bronze sculpture

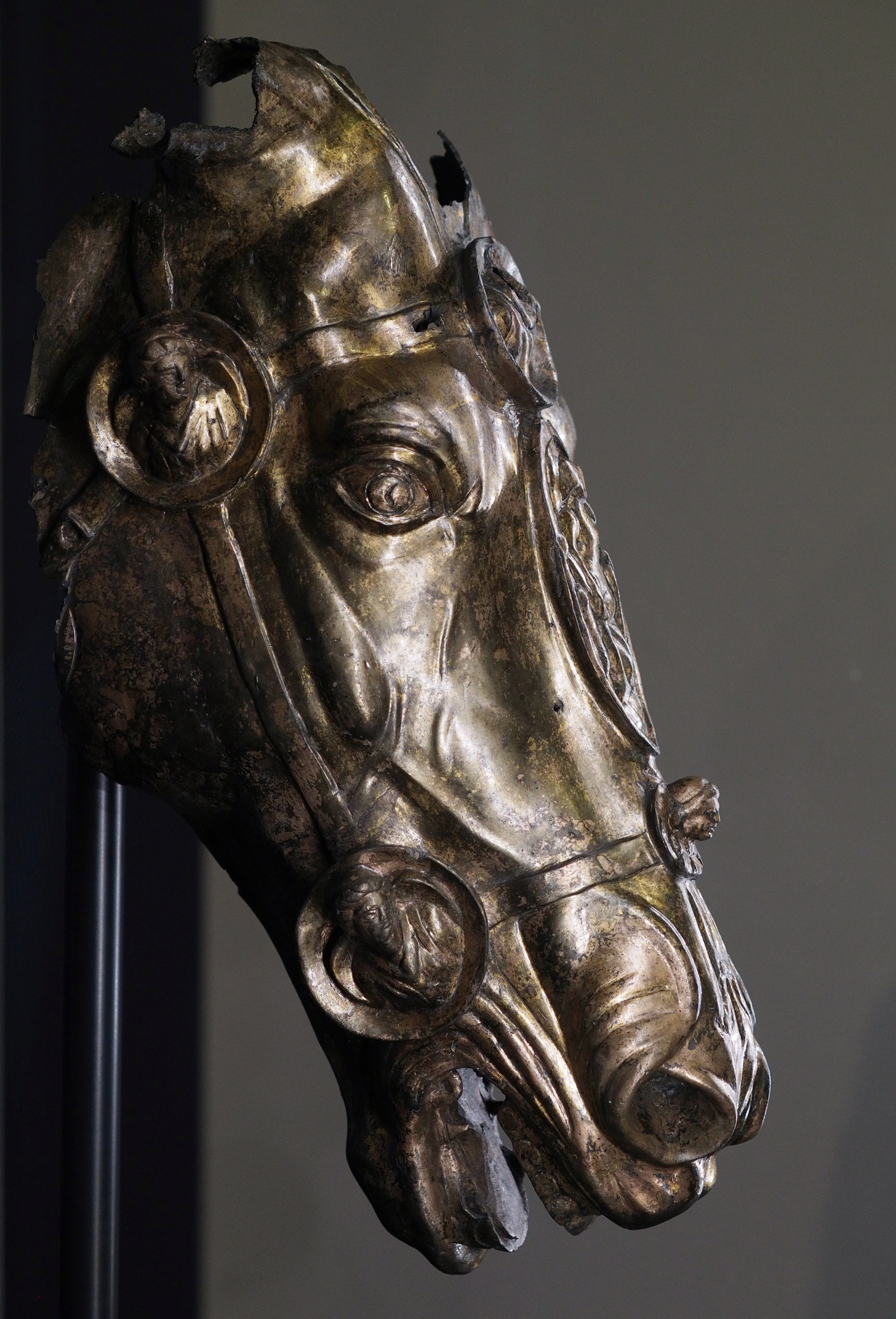
The horse's head, as presented behind bulletproof glass in the Saalburg museum. It belonged to an equestrian statue produced about 2000 years ago.

The horse's head of Waldgirmes (German: Pferdekopf von Waldgirmes), is part of a gilded bronze Roman sculpture, presumably an equestrian statue of the Emperor Augustus. It was found in 2009 on a field close to the former Roman Forum of Lahnau-Waldgirmes (German: Römisches Forum Lahnau-Waldgirmes) in the municipality of Lahnau in the German state of Hesse. The Waldgrimes forum was a fortified Roman trading place, and has the oldest known stone buildings in Magna Germania.

Since August 19, 2018, the horse's head is on display in the Saalburgmuseum in Saalburg, Germany.

== Discovery ==
The head was buried 11 metres below the ground in a collapsed well shaft, hidden in a barrel, and had been found in the course of archeological excavation works of a former Roman settlement.

== Composition ==
The piece is 59 cm long, weighs about 15 kg, and has been carefully restored. It is made of gilded bronze and is considered to be one of the most important archeological finds in Germany.

Research on the sculpture suggests the head belonged to an equestrian statue that was erected in the Forum of Waldgirmes, likely representing Roman Emperor Augustus.

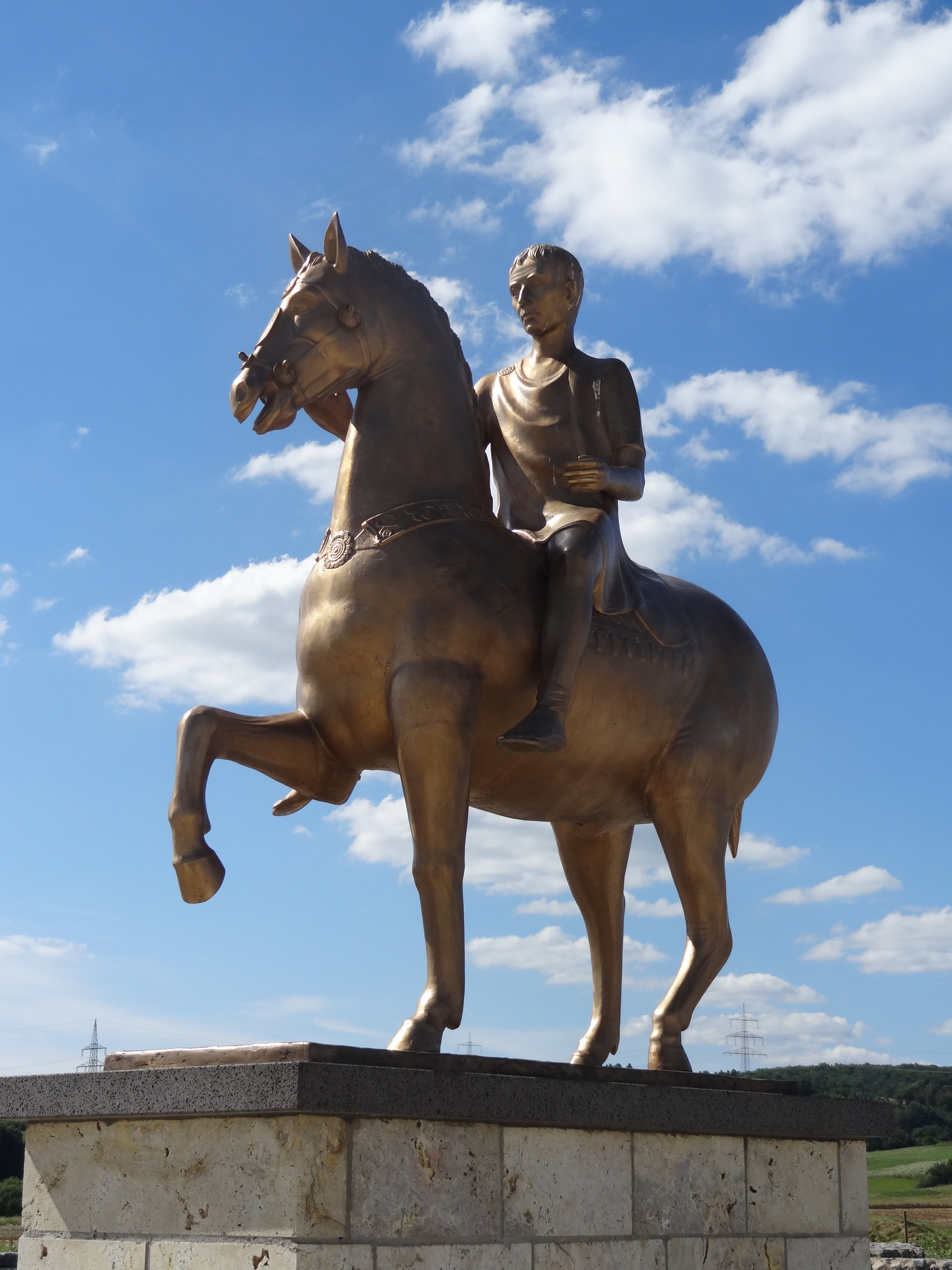
Replica of the complete imagined statue in the Waldgirmes Forum

Some estimates date the sculpture to 1 A.D. Others put the date range to a period between 4 BC and 16 AD. The discovery has suggested a more peaceful history of Romans in Germany than previously considered. The existence of the statue has led to theories that Romans lived a more settled life in ancient Germany than researchers previously thought.

== Value ==
For years, the state of Hesse and the landowner argued over the compensation the owner of the land was entitled to, until the district court of Limburg set it at 773.000 Euros. Estimates of its value are almost U.S. $2 million.
