= Waldgirmes Forum =

Archaeological site in Lahnau, Germany

Coordinates: 50°35′18″N 8°32′28″E

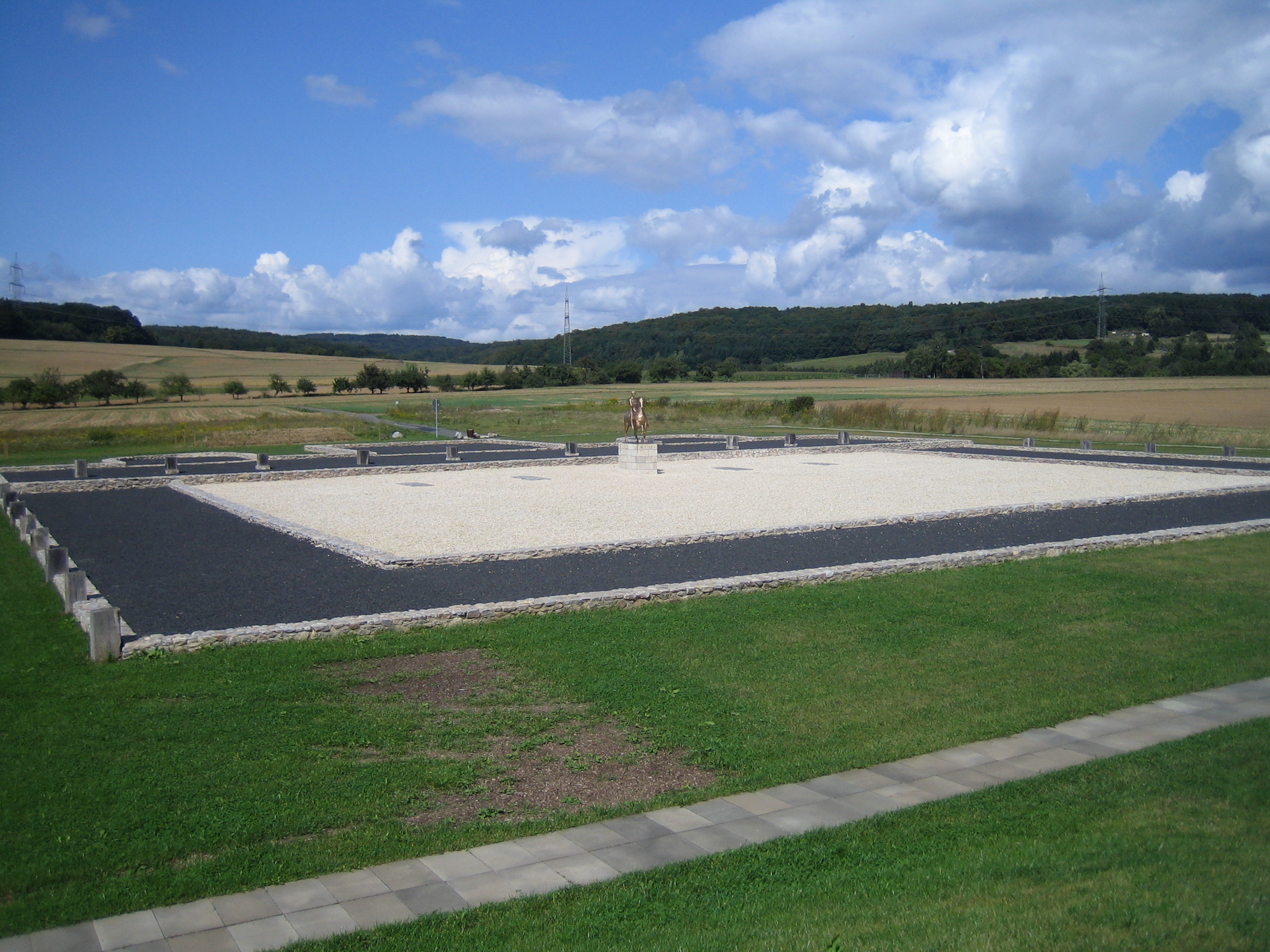
Reconstructed layout of the Roman forum at Lahnau-Waldgirmes

The Roman Forum of Lahnau-Waldgirmes (German: Römisches Forum Lahnau-Waldgirmes) is a fortified Roman trading place, located at the edge of the modern village Waldgirmes, part of Lahnau on the Lahn, Hesse, Germany. The site has the oldest known stone buildings in Magna Germania.

The archaeological evidence at Waldgirmes suggests the remains of one of a series of planned towns and market places founded by the Romans east of the Rhine and north of the Danube, with the aim of long-term growth into population centres. The complex was never completed. In the absence of any historical reference or local inscriptions, the original name of the site remains unknown.

== History ==
Waldgirmes was probably founded by Drusus and was located ca. 100 km southeast of Colonia

Since Theodor Mommsen, it had been assumed that Roman operations in Greater Germania were limited to exploratory expeditions, and small temporary trading stations. This was despite Cassius Dio's (56,18,2) reference to the foundation of some cities during the governorship of Varus.

Waldgirmes appears to have been one such place, designed to trade with the Germanic population and to supply Roman troops. The Celtic oppidum of "Dünsberg", abandoned around 20 BC, was about 20 km from the new site.

Waldgirmes appears to have been a planned new foundation on a virgin site. Dendrochronological study of the wooden wall indicates that the trees providing the wood was felled around 4 BC. Thus, the settlement's construction probably started before that time. Its location, on a spur of land jutting into the Lahn river, was highly defensible.

Additionally, it would have been possible to reach areas of established Roman presence along the Rhine (like Colonia Claudia Ara Agrippinensium and Castra Vetera) relatively quickly by boat.

The actions of Domitius Ahenobarbus suggest the frame of action of Roman policy: settlements and relocations, indirect actions with individual tribes and the development of traffic connections and infrastructure. Siegmar von Schnurbein was able to show that the function of Haltern/Aliso was probably extended to include further administrative and logistic tasks. The founding of Waldgirmes started the development of civilian structures...The development of a civil Roman infrastructure is, however, the prerequisite and a clear sign of an intended transfer from conqueror to direct, permanent rule...the findings of Waldgirmes will probably no longer permit denying the temporary goal of founding a province. Roman Forum Lahnau-Waldgirmes

The existence of the oversized forum at the centre of the site suggests that it may have been intended to form the core settlement of a future civitas, an important part of a projected Romanisation of the area. It is possible that Waldgimes was going to be a colonia for legio veterans, because no barracks and no military equipment have been found in the recent excavations

The site remained unfinished, indicated by the large undeveloped areas. Following the battle of the Teutoburg Forest, when virtually all Roman military posts east of the Rhine were lost, Waldgirmes was abandoned. The finds suggest that this was intentional: between 9 and 16 AD, during the period of Roman punitive expeditions, the site was occasionally used as a military camp. After that, it was destroyed by the Roman army.

== A Romano-German city? ==
There were few obviously military finds, and several obviously ‘civilian’ finds, notably several intaglios typical of the jewellery of well to do Romans. The pottery while being mostly of the more normal Roman types also contained a substantial amount both of Germanic, and indeed Celtic pottery types. Unlike the fort of Haltern/Aliso, where there was virtually no Germanic type pottery, and where presumably the native Germans never entered the fort, at Waldgirmes nearly 20% of the pottery was Germanic, suggesting that there must have been a substantial German native presence in the town. The historian Cassius Dio in a famous passage (56, 18) said that in Germany ‘already cities were being founded; the barbarians were gradually reshaping their habits in conformity with the Roman pattern and were becoming accustomed to holding markets and were meeting in peaceful assembly’. Prior to the discovery of Waldgirmes, this passage was controversial, but now it is clear that not only was a city founded, but it would appear that Germans were actually entering the city and leaving behind their broken pots as evidence of their presence.Cura.co.UK

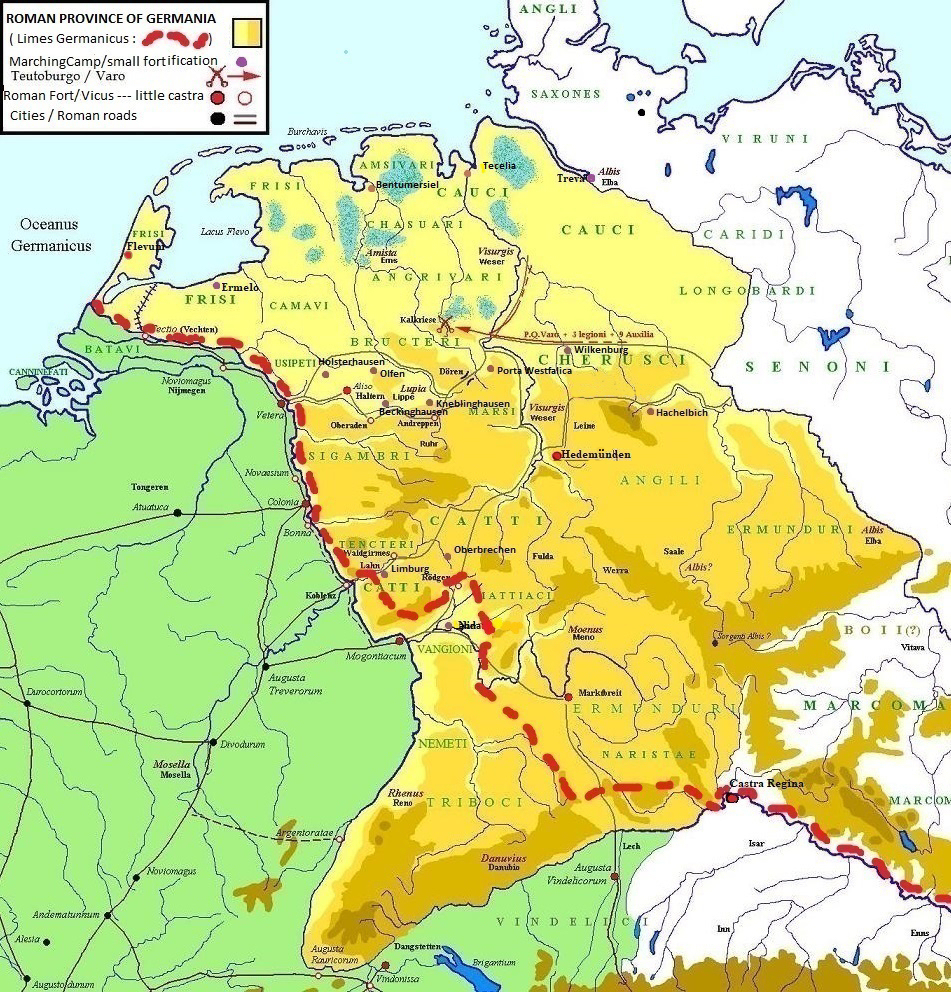
Map of the Roman province of Germania showing Marktbreit

The site has the oldest known stone buildings in Magna Germania.

The archaeological evidence at Waldgirmes suggests the remains of one of a series of planned towns and market places founded by the Romans east of the Rhine and north of the Danube, with the aim of long-term growth into population centers of the newly created province of Germania.

== Archaeological evidence and finds ==
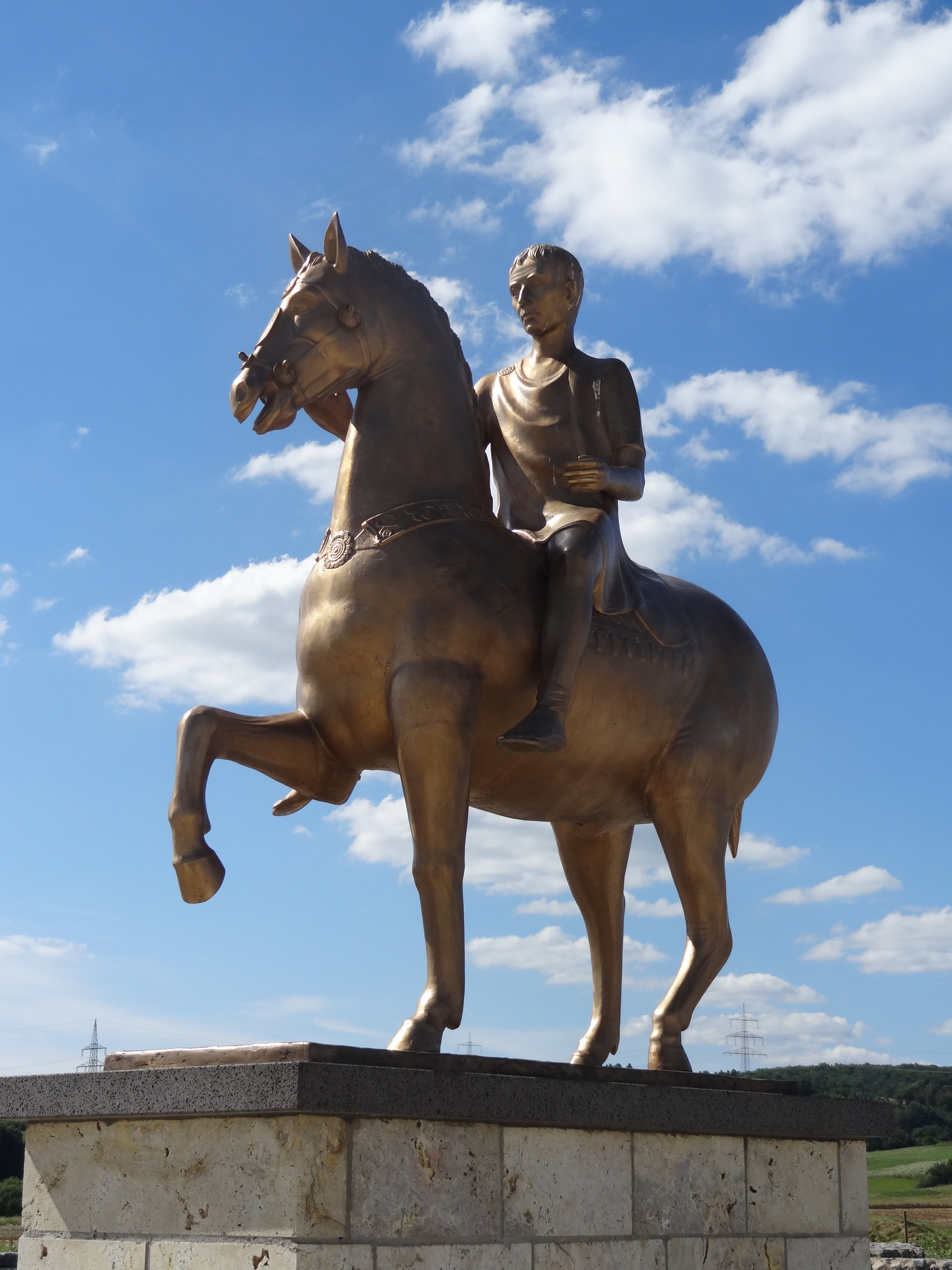
Statue of the emperor Augustus (replica)

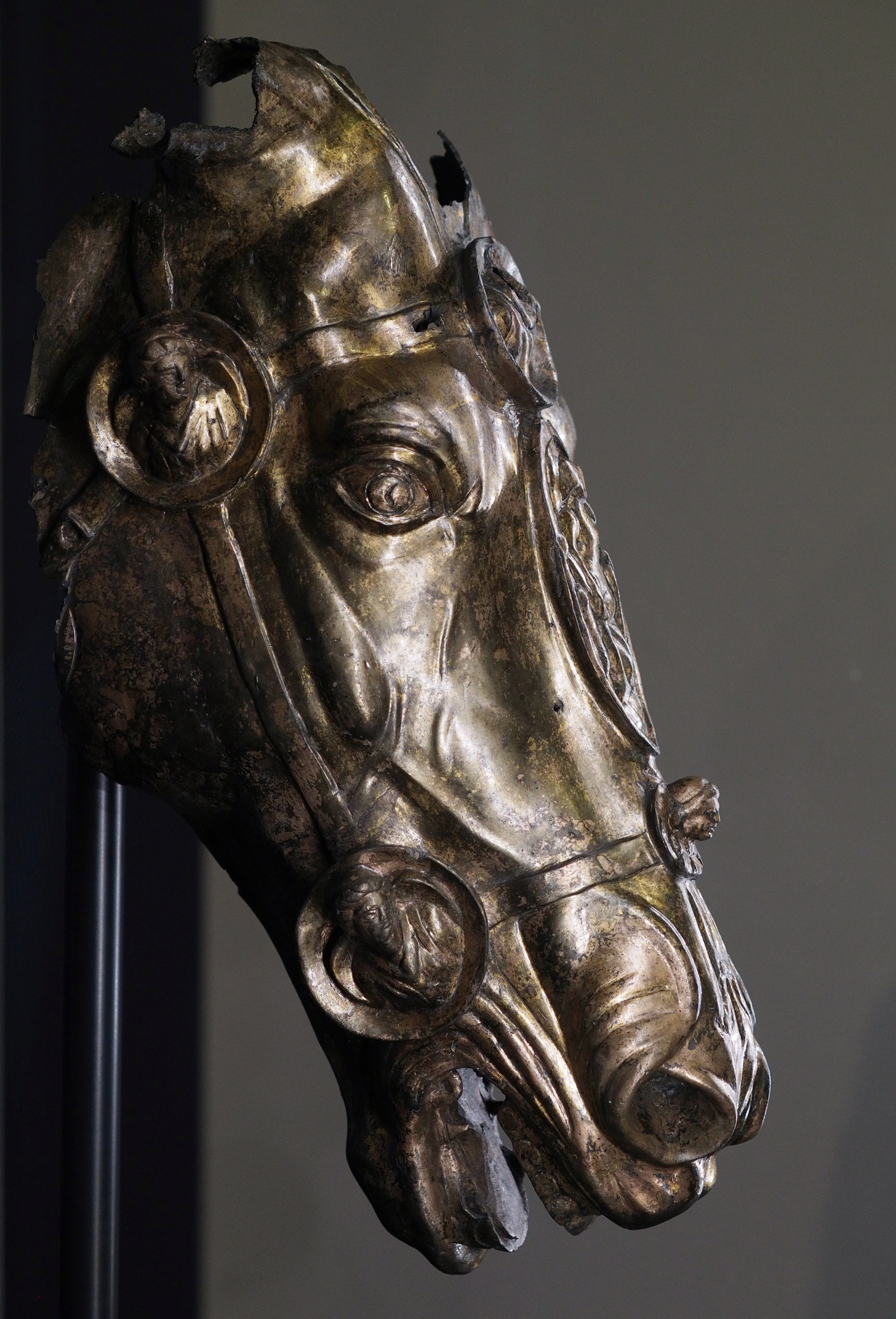
Roman Horse's head of Waldgirmes displayed in the Saalburg museum, Bad Homburg, Germany. Found in 2009.

The area, just northwest of Waldgirmes and at the eastern city limit of Wetzlar, has been the subject of archaeological excavation since 1993. The remains discovered include an impressive forum, on one side of which stood a stone-built central building or basilica, flanked by two apses, Further structures were built using the Roman half-timbered technique on stone foundations. Their roofs were of wooden slates.

The complex was surrounded by a wooden palisade with a double ditch and three gates to the west, east and south. The location of what would have been the northern gate was taken by a tower. From the outside, it would have looked like a Roman military fort, but its interior contained a trading centre with a market, two crossing streets with central channels for drainage or water supplies, stables, storage buildings, taverns and houses with wooden porticos. By 2004, 24 house floorplans and a well of 4 m depth had been excavated. No temple has been discovered, a fact that may be explained by the short duration of activity at the site. Everything found resembles a higher-status Roman settlement; nothing is reminiscent of Germanic or Celtic traditions.

One of the most important finds is 200 fragments of a life-sized gilded bronze equestrian statue, probably of Augustus, discovered in and around the central building and surrounding settlement. Other important finds include a glass seal with a depiction of Niobe, a mosaic glass bead depicting Apis, several other pieces of jewellery, and some unworked amber. The pottery found was predominantly Roman, simple handmade Germanic material made up only about 20% of the total ceramics. Apparently, different ethnic groups inhabited the site side by side. Coins found date activity at Waldgirmes to between 5 BC and 9 AD, the year of the Battle of Teutoburg Forest.

== Bibliography ==
- Armin Becker, Gabriele Rasbach: „Städte in Germanien“: Der Fundplatz Waldgirmes. In: Rainer Wiegels (ed.): Die Varusschlacht. Wendepunkt der Geschichte?. Theiss, Stuttgart 2007 (Archäologie in Deutschland, Sonderheft), ISBN 978-3-8062-1760-5, S. 102–116.
- Gabriele Rasbach, Armin Becker: Die spätaugusteische Stadtgründung in Lahnau-Waldgirmes. Archäologische, architektonische und naturwissenschaftliche Untersuchungen. In: Germania 81 (2003), S. 147–199.
- Michael Zick: Rom an der Lahn. In: Abenteuer Archäologie 2006, 1, S. 46ff. ISSN 1612-9954 (online)
