= Lahn, Hesse =

Former municipality in Germany

Coordinates: 50°34′20″N 8°35′20″E

Lahn (German pronunciation: [laːn]) was a district-free city in the state of Hesse, which was created on January 1, 1977 during the Hessian administrative reform when the two cities of Gießen and Wetzlar were merged. It was named after the river Lahn to make the merger one of equals. However, as the merger was very unpopular as well as inefficient—it had been imposed on the cities against the will of almost all inhabitants—it was rescinded on July 31, 1979; so the city Lahn only existed for two and a half years.

== Creation ==
The creation of the city was supported by then-Minister-President of Hesse Albert Osswald, who had been the Lord Mayor of Gießen from 1957 to 1963 and saw the new city as "work of the century" (Jahrhundertwerk), believing that it would strengthen central Hesse against the two major population center of Kassel in the north and Frankfurt in the south of the state.

The new city was created out of the then district-free city of Gießen, the municipality of Heuchelheim from the Giessen district, and fourteen municipalities from the Wetzlar district - Wetzlar, Atzbach, Dutenhofen, Garbenheim, Hermannstein, Krofdorf-Gleiberg, Launsbach, Lützellinden, Münchholzhausen, Nauborn, Naunheim, Steindorf, Waldgirmes and Wißmar. At the time of creation (January 1, 1977), the city had an estimated population of 156,000 on an area of 225.57 km² (73,600 in Lahn-Gießen, 49,600 in Lahn-Wetzlar, 10,400 in Lahn-Wettenberg, 7,800 in Lahn-Lahntal, 8,100 in Lahn-Dutenhofen and 7,100 in Lahn-Heuchelheim). The city was assigned the Gemeindeschlüssel 06 1 17 000 and license plate area code L. Originally, L was planned for Leipzig, then in the East Germany; at the time, however, chances for reunification seemed slim. Some critics saw it as provocation by the federal level social-liberal coalition, some even as a de facto recognition as the division of Germany. According to the 31 December 1977 estimates, the city's population was 154,089 (73,501 men and 80,588 women) on 225.57 km² area; and by 31 December 1978 153,678 (73,332 men and 80,346 women).

== Reception ==
=== Citizen concern over merger ===
The merger quickly proved to be unpopular, especially in the part of Wetzlar. According to the 27 May 1970 census, Gießen had a population of 75,555 was slightly more than twice Wetzlar's 36,618, enough for Wetzlar residents to consider the merger to be subordination to Gießen. In addition to that, the merger was done rather awkwardly, as the new city had no clear central functional orientation, but two city cores which co-existed and competed with each other, with completely different characters: Lahn-Gießen was an administrative, university and shopping district, while Lahn-Wetzlar was an industrial and shopping district. The city cores were approximately 15 kilometers apart, and the territory in-between (today municipalities of Heuchelheim and Lahnau) was rather sparsely populated with village-like districts, making networking and differentation of functions very difficult.

The Wetzlar residents feared their city would be structurally crushed by the larger Gießen and end up degenerating into Gießen's dormitory town. The feeling was further reinforced by the postal codes - the new city kept using Gießen's postal code of 6300. However, letters to Gießen would be addressed as "6300 Lahn 1" and to Wetzlar as "6300 Lahn 2". In addition, the areas between Gießen and Wetzlar feared that the areas would be robbed of their character by a large expansion of building areas, increasing the traffic congestion between the two cities.

=== Dislike of the name ===
In addition, the name "Lahn" was not liked. Originally, it was planned to name the town Gießen-Wetzlar, but instead Lahn was chosen so that the villages could append their names. However, it was felt that the name "Lahn" lacked history. Cars soon started sporting bumper stickers "Wenn ich Lahn seh, krieg ich Zahnweh" (When I see 'Lahn', I get a toothache), even Bundeskanzler Helmut Schmidt criticized the naming as "I can't imagine anything under a Lotte in Lahn" (Unter einer Lotte in Lahn kann ich mir nichts vorstellen) (alluding to both the character Lotte in Johann Wolfgang von Goethe's The Sorrows of Young Werther and Thomas Mann's novel Lotte in Weimar: The Beloved Returns based on the same story).

=== Political reactions ===
The creation of the city led to political consequences - SPD, which had been instrumental in pushing the reform, lost the local elections in March 1977, in favor of CDU candidates, who ran as opponents to the Lahn city. CDU succeeded in winning a majority of 50.7% of the vote in Lahn and Wilhelm Runtsch was elected mayor. He died already on 20 August 1977, and was replaced by Hans Görnert, who after the city's dissolution would remain the mayor of the city of Gießen until 1985.

In addition, Osswald's successor as Minister-President, Holger Börner, also from SPD, did not support Lahn, calling it "rubble" (Scheißdreck), and in a message to Lahn residents, spoke: "Such old significant cities as Gießen and Wetzlar with their rich past, their differently shaped structure and their uniqueness cannot be merged into a new artificial entity against the will of the citizens. This is where the mistake lay, and the citizens ultimately told us so. That's why I advocate dissolving this forced marriage again." ("So alte bedeutsame Städte wie Gießen und Wetzlar mit ihrer reichen Vergangenheit, ihrer unterschiedlich geprägten Struktur und ihrer Eigenart kann man nicht gegen den Willen der Bürger zu einem neuen künstlichen Gebilde zusammenfügen. Hier lag der Fehler, und die Bürger haben es uns letztlich gesagt. Deshalb bin ich dafür eingetreten, diese Zwangsehe wieder aufzulösen.") In September 1978, ahead of the state elections, he spoke in Wetzlar: "Giessen will be Giessen again, Wetzlar will be Wetzlar again." ("Gießen wird wieder Gießen, Wetzlar wieder Wetzlar.")

== Dissolution ==
Just 31 months after the creation, on August 1, 1979 the city was dissolved. Gießen did not regain its former district-free status and was incorporated into the eponymous district, but gained Lützellinden as a new city district; while Wetzlar was incorporated into the newly formed Lahn-Dill-Kreis and became its seat, whilst gaining the former municipalities of Dutenhofen, Garbenheim, Hermannstein, Münchholzhausen, Nauborn, Naunheim and Steindorf as new city districts. In addition, the municipality of Heuchelheim was restored in Gießen district, and two new municipalities were created - Wettenberg in the Gießen district (out of former municipalities of Krofdorf-Gleiberg, Launsbach and Wißmar) and Lahnau in the Lahn-Dill-Kreis (out of former municipalities of Atzbach and Waldgirmes, and former Wetzlar city district of Dorlar). Also on January 1, 1981, the central Hesse (Gießen area) was separated from the Darmstadt region and assigned to its own Giessen region.

Following Lahn's dissolution, the Lahn-Dill-Kreis originally retained the city's license plate code L. However, with the German reunification on October 3, 1990, L was reassigned to Leipzig and the district was issued new code LDK. Also on July 1, 2012, the city of Wetzlar received its own code WZ. Since May 2014, the residents of Lahn-Dill-Kreis (except city of Wetzlar) can also obtain plates with old distinguishing code DIL. The only way to determine if a car with a L plate was registered in Hesse or Saxony is by the identification number. In addition, some vehicle owners also used the sticker with text "L – aber nicht aus Leipzig!" ("L - but not from Leipzig!")
