= Agri Decumates =

Region of the Roman Empire

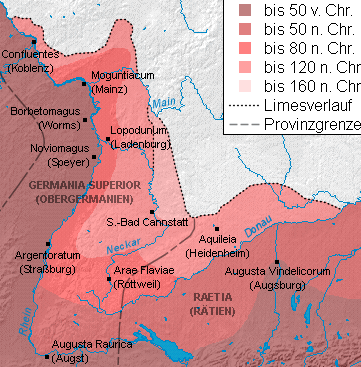
Roman expansion in southwest Germany

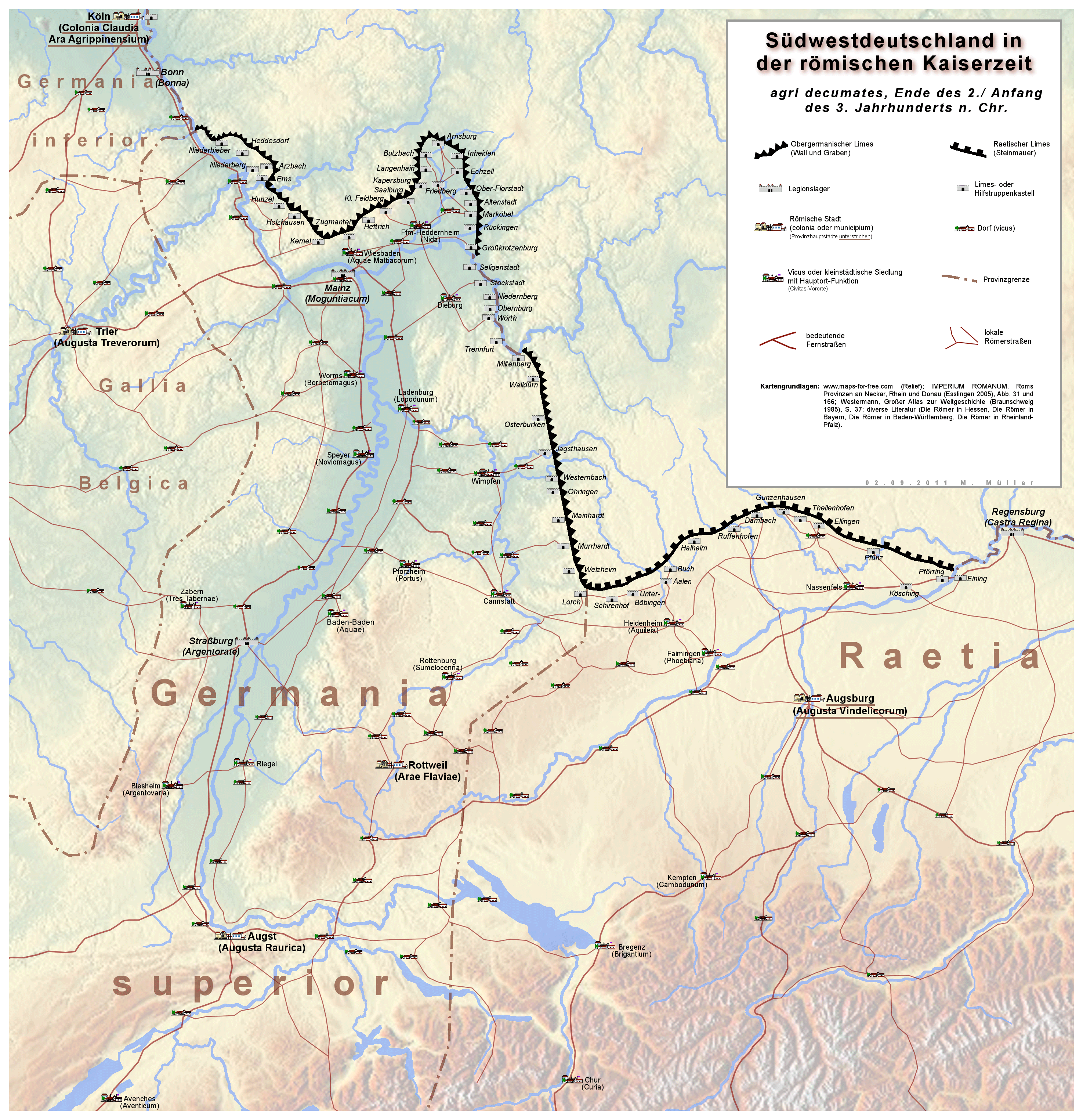
The Limes Germanicus and the Agri Decumates

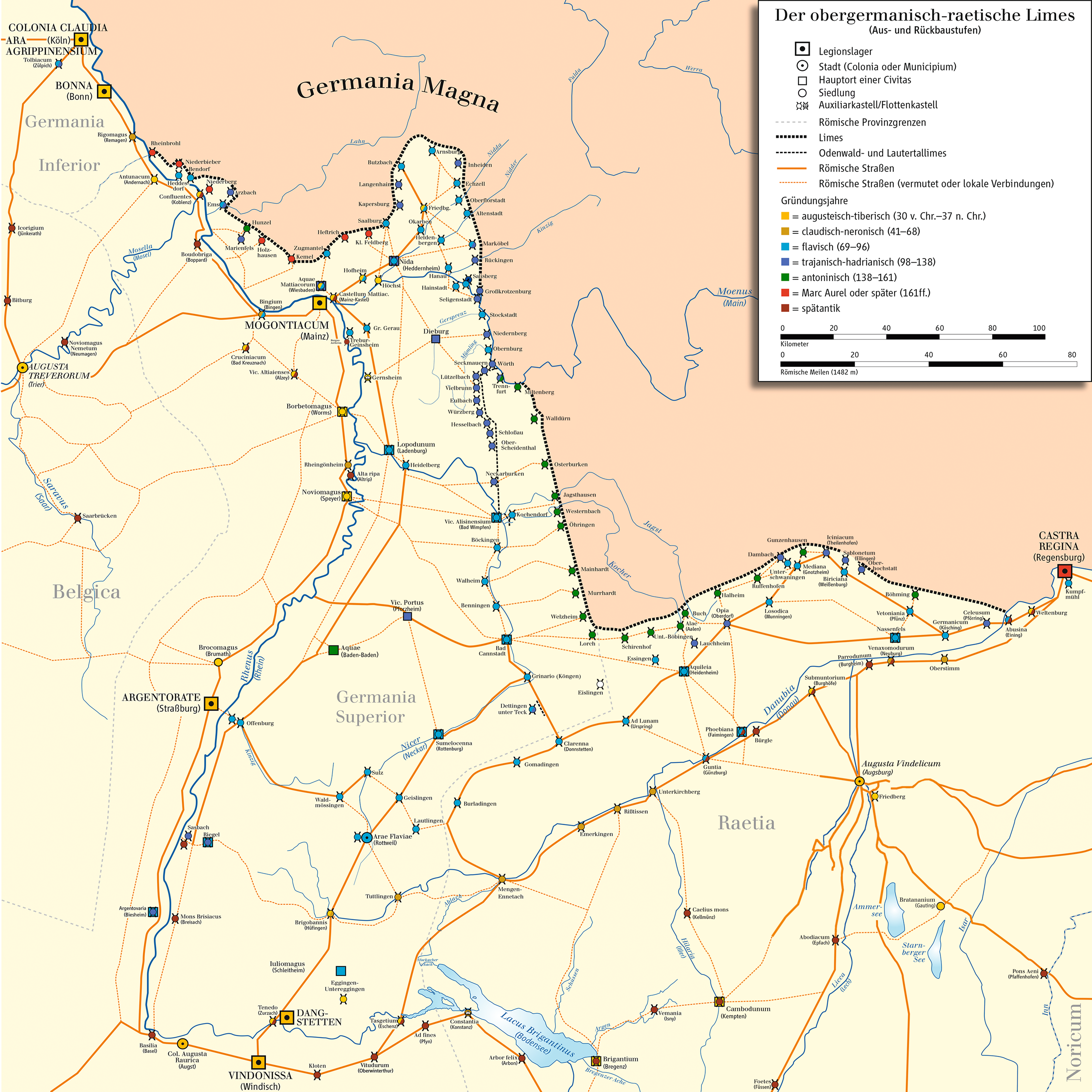
The Upper Germanic & Raetian Limes

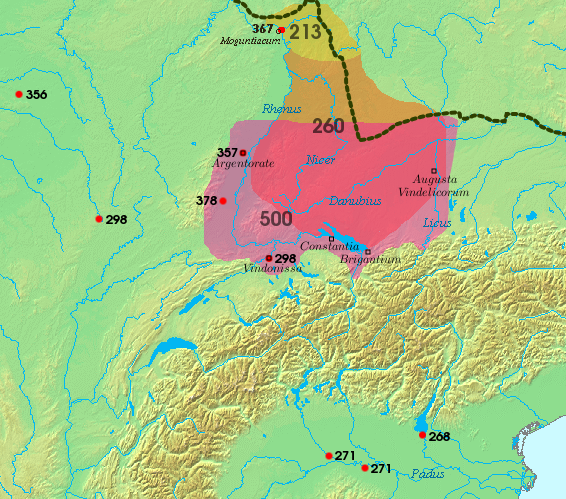
Alemannic expansion and Roman-Alemannic battle sites, 3rd to 5th century

The Agri Decumates or Decumates Agri ("Decumatian Fields") were a region of the Roman Empire's provinces of Germania Superior and Raetia, covering the Black Forest, Swabian Jura, and Franconian Jura areas between the Rhine, Main, and Danube rivers, in present southwestern Germany, including present Frankfurt, Stuttgart, Freiburg im Breisgau, and Weißenburg in Bayern. The only ancient reference to the name comes from Tacitus' book Germania (chapter 29). However, the later geographer Claudius Ptolemy does mention "the desert of the Helvetians" in this area.

The meaning of Decumates is lost and has been the subject of much contention. According to the English Classicist Michael Grant, the word probably refers to an ancient Celtic term indicating the political division of the area into "ten cantons." Another theory is that the term implies that a tithe was paid by residents living in this country.

According to Tacitus, the region was originally populated by the Celtic tribe of the Helvetii, but soon Germanic and Gaulish settlers arrived. Tacitus writes that:

I should not reckon among the Germanic tribes the cultivators of the tithe-lands [agri decumates], although they are settled on the further side of the Rhine and Danube. Reckless adventurers from Gaul, emboldened by want, occupied this land of questionable ownership. After a while, our frontier having been advanced, and our military positions pushed forward, it was regarded as a remote nook of our empire and a part of a Roman province.

Under the Flavian and later emperors, Romans took control and settled the region. They built a road network for military communications and movements, and improved protection from invading tribes using the region to penetrate into Roman Gaul. Frontier fortifications (limes) were constructed along a line running Rheinbrohl—Arnsburg—Inheiden—Schierenhof—Gunzenhausen—Pförring (Limes Germanicus).

The larger Roman settlements were Sumelocenna (Rottenburg am Neckar), Civitas Aurelia Aquensis (Baden-Baden), Lopodunum (Ladenburg) and Arae Flaviae (Rottweil).

Romans controlled the Agri Decumates region until the mid-3rd century, when the emperor Gallienus (259–260) evacuated it before the invading Alemanni and the secession of much of the Western Roman Empire under the "usurper and ruler" Postumus.

The emperor Aurelian (AD 270–275) may have had the region briefly reoccupied during the Roman resurgence of the late 3rd century under the so-called "military" emperors. Even if this did occur, re-establishment of Roman rule was brief. Emperor Probus definitely recaptured the area during his invasion of Germania. This presence lasted until the 290s or 300s, when the Roman military seems to have definitively abandoned the region. By about 310 the Alemanni were becoming the dominant population, although scattered Roman settlements seem to have persisted, and continued to trade with the empire, until about the mid 4th century. Germanic peoples have continuously inhabited the region since then. However, Roman settlements were not immediately abandoned. There is evidence the Roman way of life continued well into the 5th century, much as Roman patterns continued in neighbouring Gaul long after the Western Roman Empire's collapse.

J. G. F. Hind has suggested the former Roman inhabitants of the Agri Decumates were to be found from the later 3rd to the 5th centuries in the Decem Pagi—also "ten cantons"—having transferred west of the Rhine, to the region between the Rhine and the Saar, between Mainz and Metz.

== Bibliography ==
- Grant, Michael (1986), A Guide to the Ancient World: A Dictionary of Classical Place Names, New York: H. W. Wilson, ISBN 0-7607-4134-4
- Strayer, Joseph R. (1982), Dictionary of the Middle Ages, vol. 1, New York: Scribner, ISBN 0-684-18276-9
- Neumann, Günter (1984), "Decumates agri § 1. Sprachliches", in Jankuhn, Herbert; Beck, Heinrich (eds.), Reallexikon der germanischen Altertumskunde, vol. 5 (2 ed.), de Gruyter, pp. 271–273, ISBN 3-11-009635-8
- Nuber, Hans U. (1984), "Decumates agri § 2-6.", in Jankuhn, Herbert; Beck, Heinrich (eds.), Reallexikon der germanischen Altertumskunde, vol. 5 (2 ed.), de Gruyter, pp. 273–286, ISBN 3-11-009635-8
