= Canaba =

Settlement surrounding a Roman legionnary fortress

A canaba (plural canabae) was the Latin term for a hut or hovel and was later (from the time of Hadrian) used typically to mean a town that emerged as a civilian settlement (canabae legionis) in the vicinity of a Roman legionary fortress (castrum).

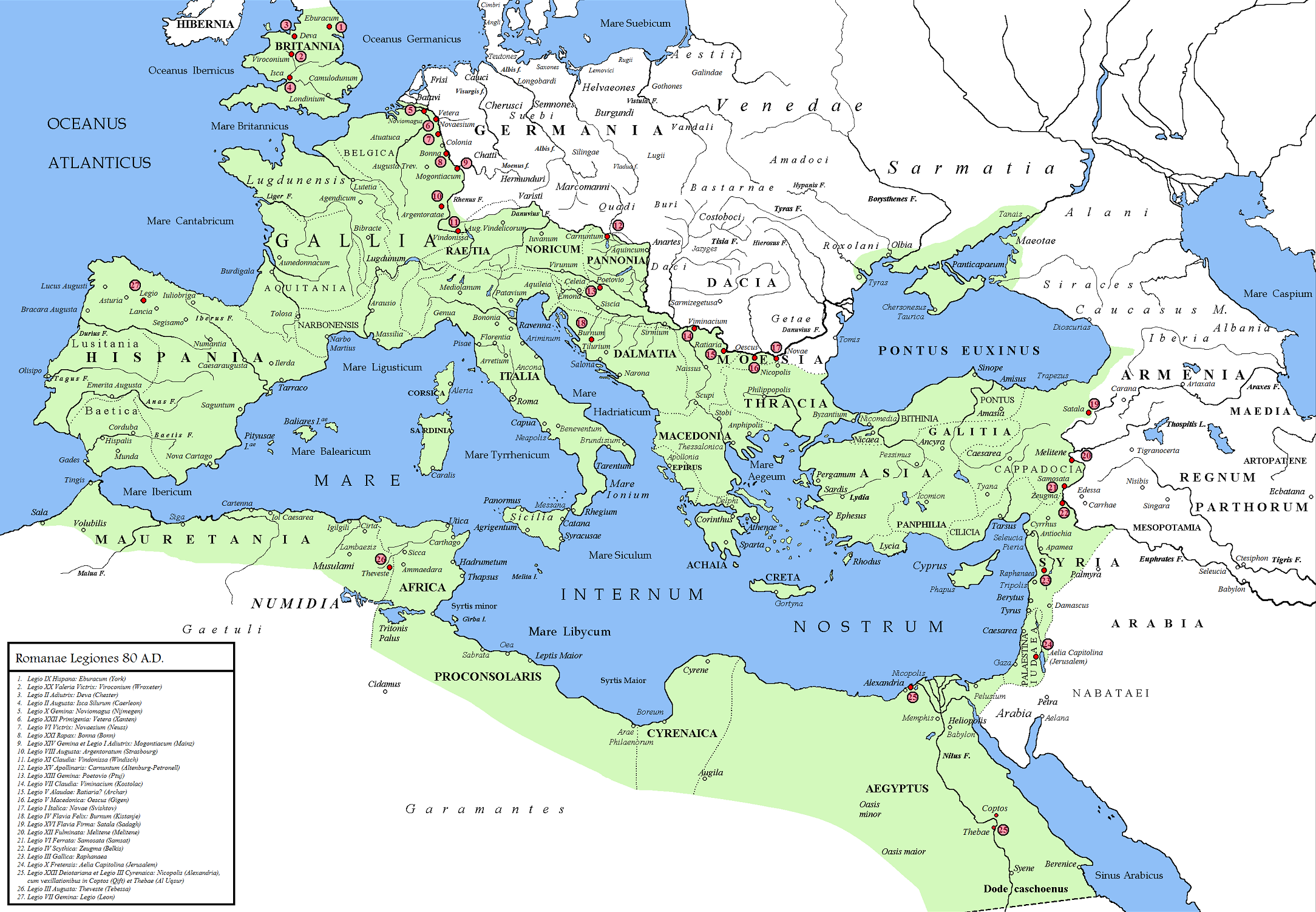
Location of legions and their Canabae in 80 AD

A settlement that grew up outside a smaller Roman fort was called a vicus (village, plural vici). Canabae were also often divided into vici.

Permanent forts attracted military dependants and civilian contractors who serviced the base and needed housing; traders, artisans, sellers of food and drink, prostitutes, and also unofficial wives of soldiers and their children and hence most forts had vici or canabae. Many of these communities became towns through synoecism with other communities, some in use today.

Some Canabae of Legionary Fortresses:

- Canabae of Deva Victrix, later Chester, England
- Canabae of Isca Silurium, later Caerleon, Wales
- Canabae of Novae, Bulgaria
- Canabae of Vindobona, later Vienna
- Canabae of Argentoratum, later Strasbourg
- Canabae of Nijmegen, Netherlands
- Canabae of Troesmis, Romania
