= Lahnau =

- Municipality
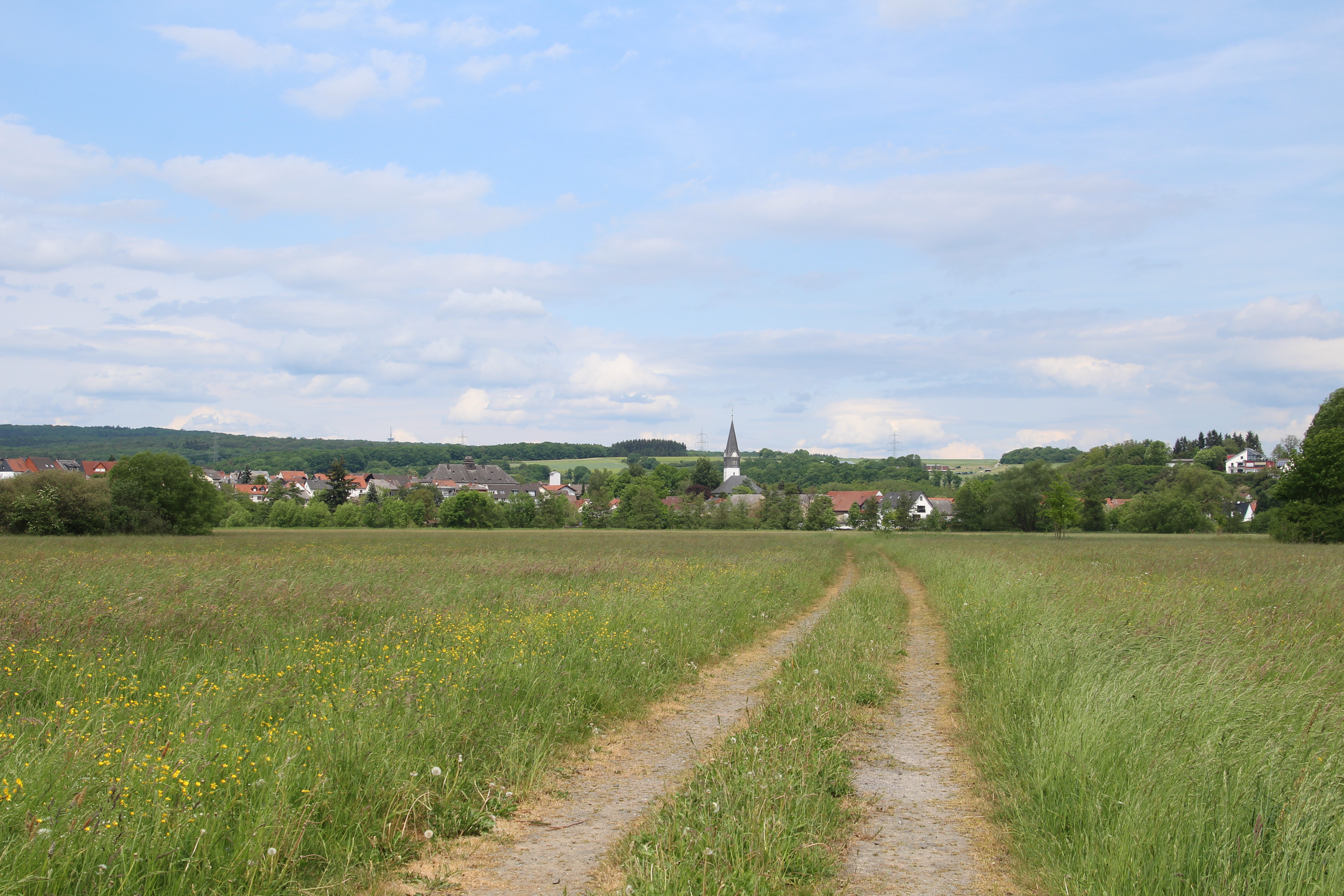
- Atzbach

- Coat of arms

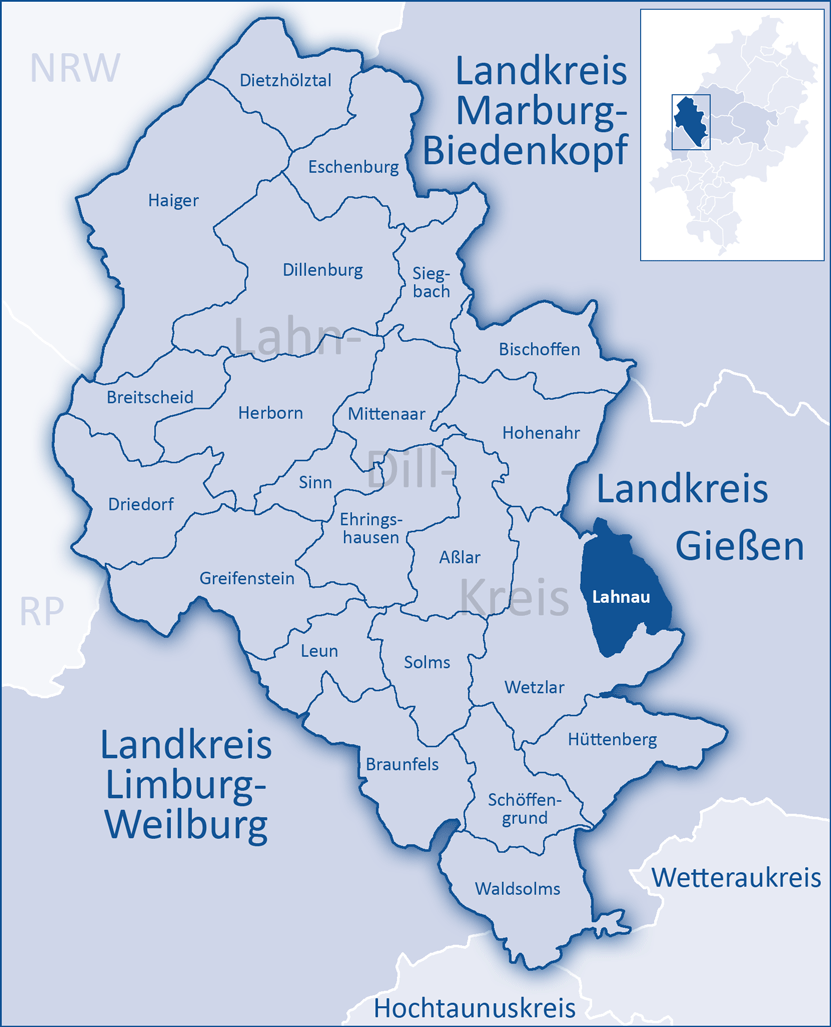
- Location of Lahnau within Lahn-Dill-Kreis district
- Interactive map of Lahnau
- Location within Germany Location within Hesse
- Coordinates: 50°34′N 08°34′E
- Country: Germany
- State: Hesse
- Admin. region: Gießen
- District: Lahn-Dill-Kreis
- Subdivisions: 3 Ortsteile

Government
  - Mayor (2023–29): Christian Walendsius (SPD)

Area
  - Total: 23.94 km^{2} (9.24 sq mi)
- Elevation: 166 m (545 ft)

Population (2025-12-31)
  - Total: 8,131
  - Density: 339.6/km^{2} (879.7/sq mi)
- Time zone: UTC+01:00 (CET)
  - Summer (DST): UTC+02:00 (CEST)
- Postal codes: 35633
- Dialling codes: 06441
- Vehicle registration: LDK
- Website: www.lahnau.de

Lahnau (German pronunciation: [ˈlaːnaʊ]) is a municipality in the Lahn-Dill-Kreis in Hesse, Germany, and lies about midway – about 6 km each way – between the towns of Wetzlar and Gießen.

== Geography ==
=== Neighbouring communities ===
Lahnau borders in the north on the community of Biebertal, in the east on the community of Heuchelheim (both in Gießen district), and in the south and west on the town of Wetzlar (Lahn-Dill-Kreis).

=== Constituent communities ===
The centres of Atzbach (3,065 inhabitants), Dorlar (1,924 inhabitants) and Waldgirmes (3,393 inhabitants) are all part of the community.

(The population figures are drawn from a statistical extrapolation from 30 June 2003)

The community of Dorlar had itself incorporated into Wetzlar in 1972. Wetzlar, Gießen, Atzbach, Waldgirmes and 12 other municipalities formed from 1977 to 1979 the city of Lahn. Within Lahn, the constituent communities of Waldgirmes, Dorlar and Atzbach the Stadtbezirk (roughly "borough") of Lahntal. After the city of Lahn was dissolved, the borough became an independent community under the name Lahnau on 1 August 1979

The constituent community of Dorlar thereby managed to belong to four different municipalities over only seven years, which stands as a curiosity even in the complex history of Hessian municipal reform.

== Public institutions ==
=== Educational institutions ===
- Lahntalschule Lahnau (district integrated comprehensive school in Atzbach)
- Grundschule Waldgirmes

=== Sports and leisure ===
- Trimm-Dich-Pfad Atzbach (path)
- Sportpark Lahnau in Dorlar, artificial turf and hard court, athletic facility
- Indoor and outdoor swimming pool with 50m × 12.5m basin and broad sunbathing lawn
- Riding hall and square
- Sports ground in Waldgirmes, natural and artificial turf

=== Clubs ===
- TSV Atzbach (gymnastic and sport club)
- SC 1929 Waldgirmes (sport club)
- TV05 Waldgirmes (gymnastic club)
- TSG Dorlar (gymnastic and sport club)
- AS LahnLaender Lahnau
- CVJM Atzbach-Dorlar (YMCA)
- CVJM Waldgirmes (YMCA)
- Sängervereinigung Waldgirmes (singers' association)
- Deutsch-Englischer Freundeskreis Lahnau e.V. (German-English circle of friends)
- Burschenschaft Fidelio Atzbach e.V. (fraternity)
- Mädchenschaft Atzbach (sorority)

== Town partnerships ==
- Wincanton, United Kingdom
- (Germany) Geraberg, Thuringia

== Culture and sightseeing ==
- The Roman Forum von Waldgirmes – owing to a lack of any Roman written record of the place it is still nameless – is Germany's oldest known stone building foundation, and shows that the Romans founded a town in Magna Germania north of the Danube and east of the Rhine. The site was dated by finds of Roman coins showing likenesses of Publius Quinctilius Varus, placing the ruins at about the time of the Battle of the Teutoburg Forest in the year 9, in which Varus lost three legions and his own life.

=== Museums ===
- Heimatmuseum in Waldgirmes (local history)

=== Buildings ===
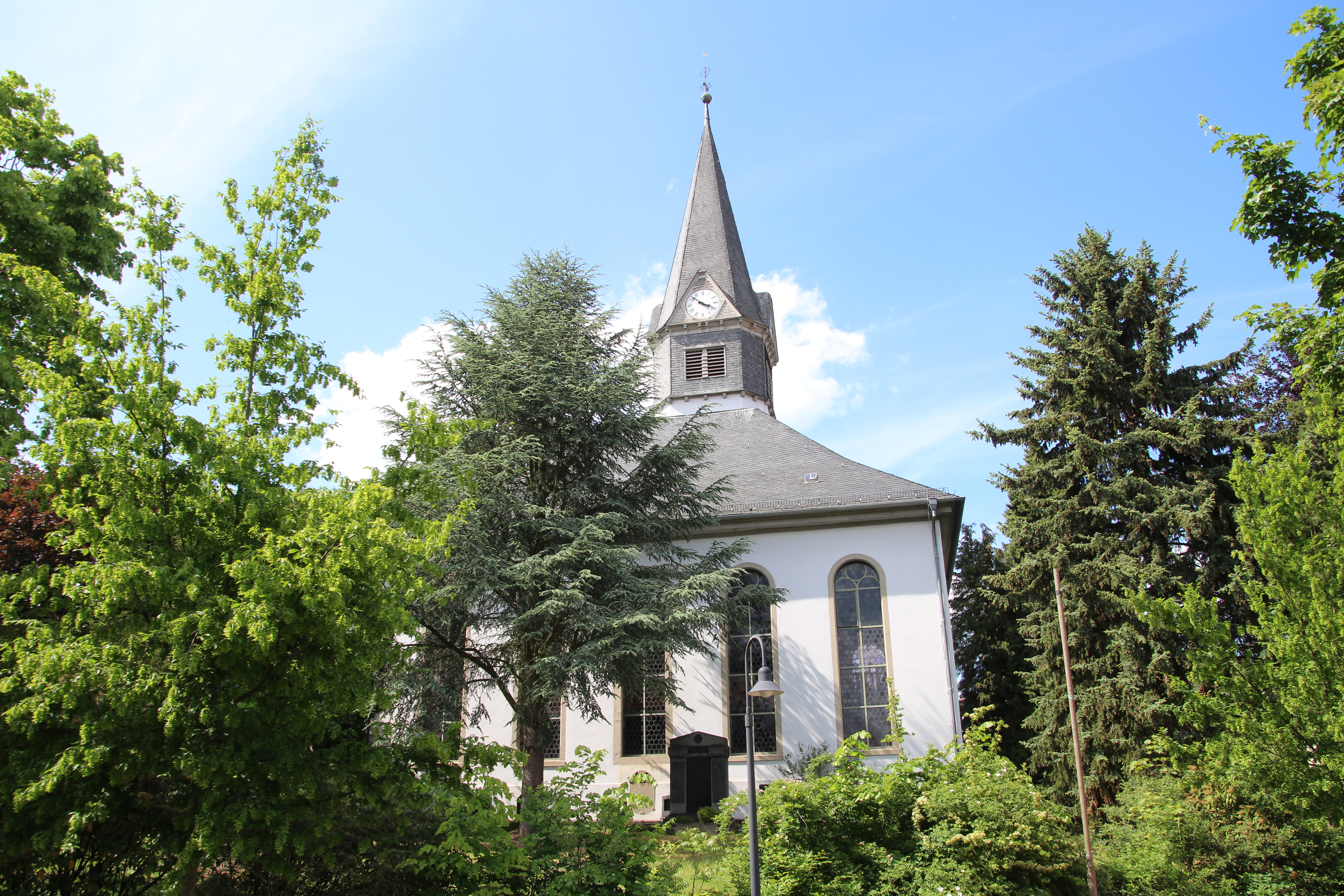
Atzbach Church

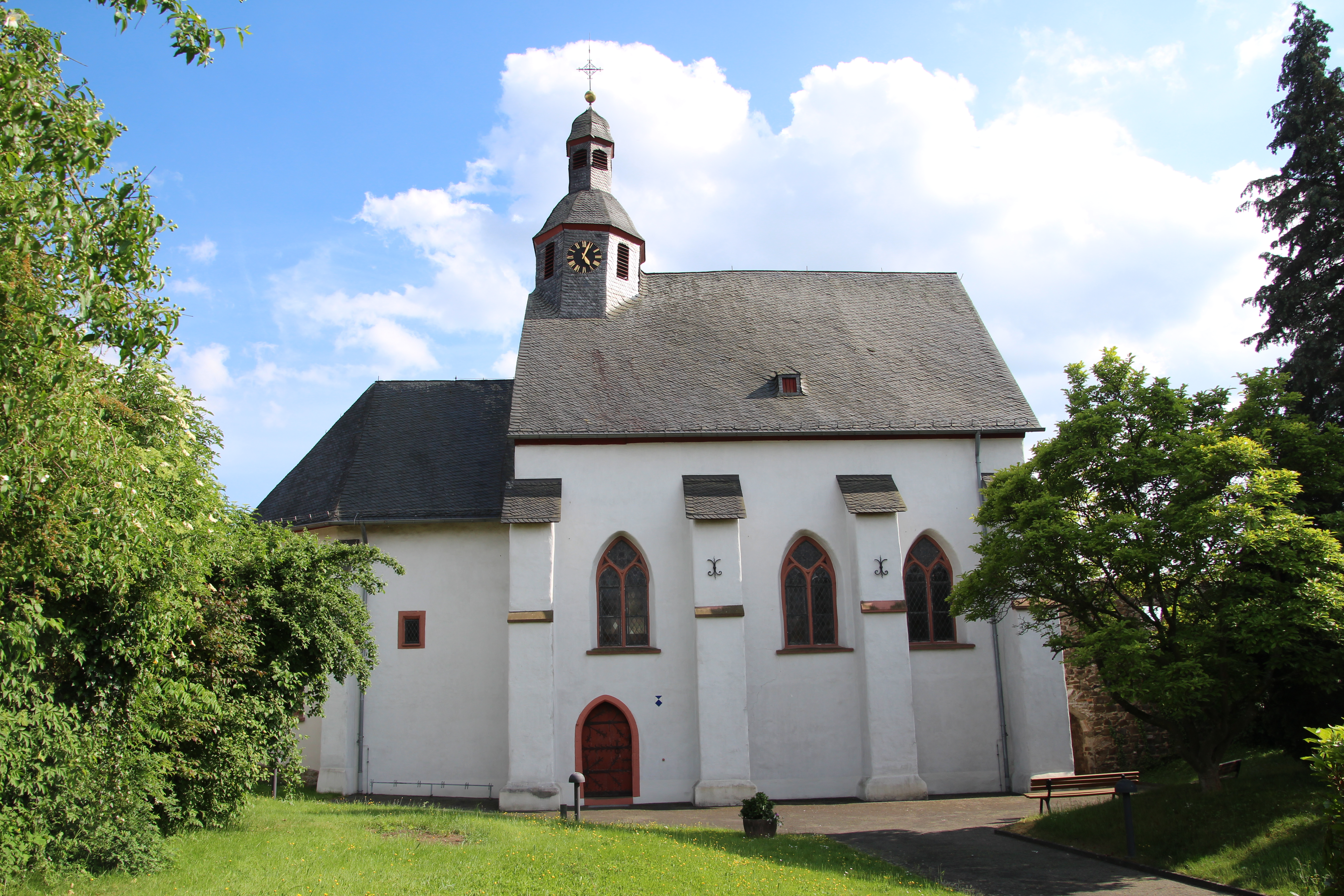
Dorlar Church

- Atzbach Church
- Amtsgericht Atzbach (formerly the Amt courthouse, now a primary school)
- Backhaus Atzbach ("bakehouse")
- Dorlar Church
- Altes Backhaus Dorlar (https://web.archive.org/web/20161003145317/http://altesbackhauslahnau.de/)
- Waldgirmes Church

=== Regular events ===
- Kirmes in Atzbach (Atzbach Fair), in May
- 2. Advent Atzbacher Adventmarkt
- LahnLaender, last Sunday in June
- Kirmes in Waldgirmes (Waldgirmes Fair), first weekend in August
