= Aliso (Roman camp) =

Aliso Castrum Aliso
- Fortified camp
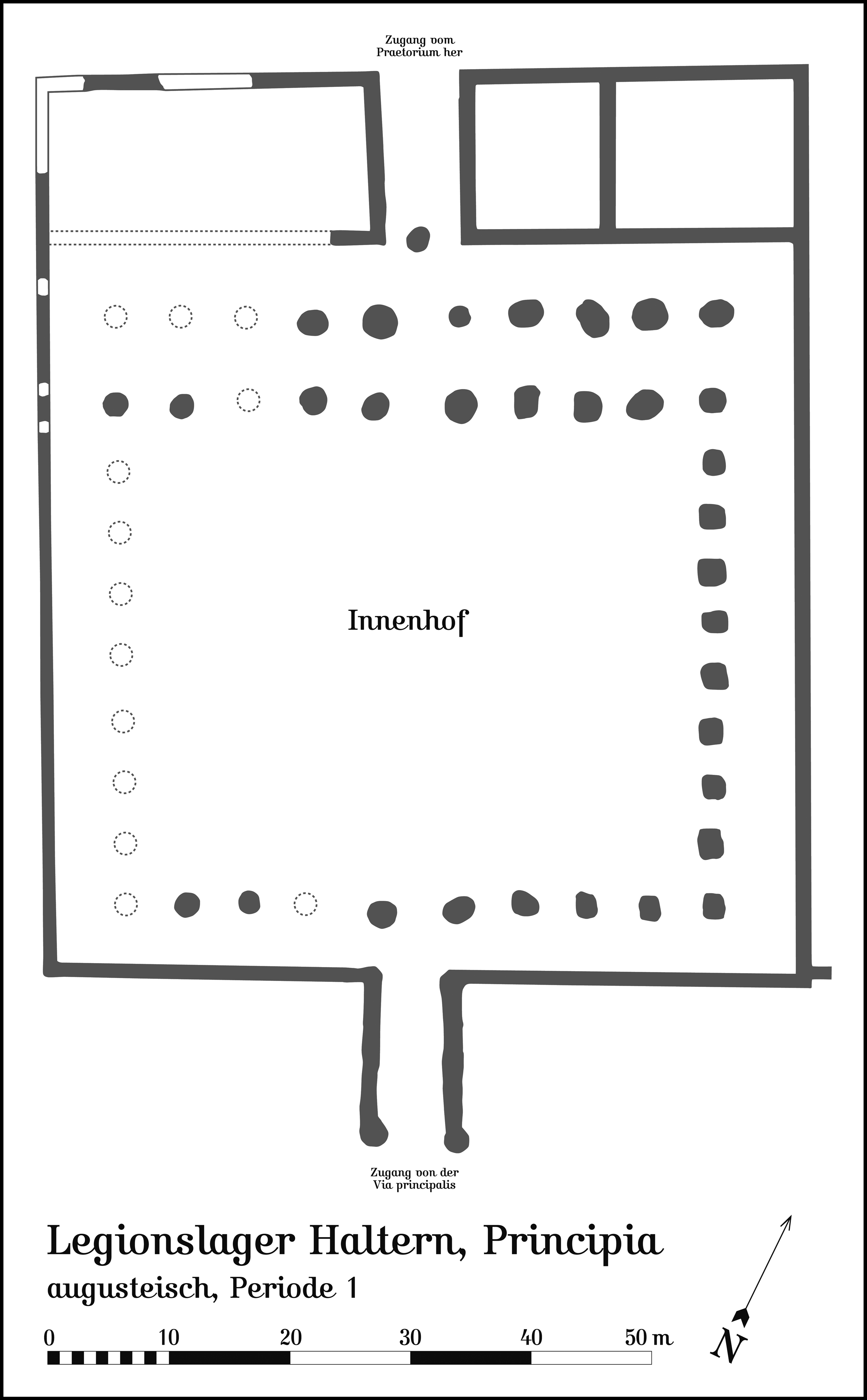
- Principia, command post of the Roman military site

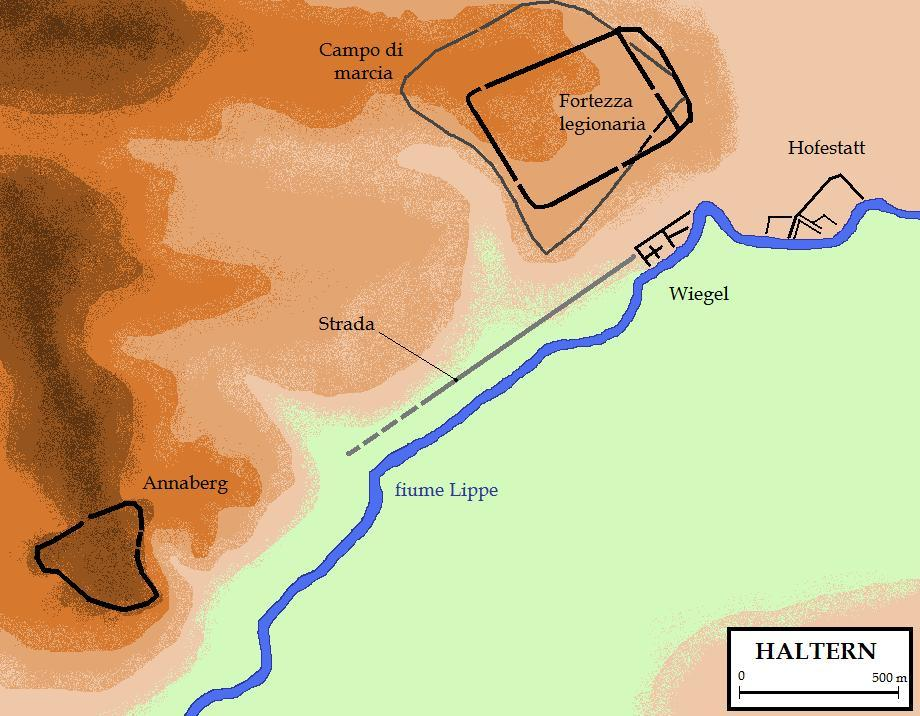
- Remains

- Location within Germany
- Coordinates: 51°44′22″N 7°10′14″E
- Country: Germany
- State: North Rhine-Westphalia
- District: Recklinghausen
- Municipality: Haltern am See

Aliso was a military and civilian colony in ancient Germany, built by the emperor Augustus near present-day Haltern am See, when he wanted to create the Roman province of Germania.

After the Battle of the Teutoburg Forest in 9 AD, Aliso was the last point of resistance of the Roman troops in Germania. Besieged by the Germans under Arminius, the garrison commanded by the prefect Lucius Caedicius put up a fierce resistance before managing to escape and regain the Roman limes.

== Location ==
The location of Aliso is the subject of various hypotheses. In 2010, the Archaeological Commission of Westphalia published a summary of excavations and discoveries near Haltern and concluded that the site corresponds to that described in ancient literature under the name of Aliso.

At the southern and eastern gates of the main Roman camp at Haltern, palisades to reinforce the enclosure were discovered as well as remains of defensive armament and a mass grave which could indicate that an attack was repulsed.

== Necropolis ==
Over the years, more than 100 tombs have been unearthed that had contained or did contain a funeral urn in which the ashes of the deceased were found. The Roman soldiers had been buried where they died.

== Terra sigillata ==
This fortress is a "type site" for certain forms of terra sigillata ceramics of the Italian type, defined by the ceramologist Siegfried Loeschcke (son of Georg Loeschcke) and entered into the typological system of the sigillata under the name of "Haltern" or HA.". The type name remained, although between 1966 and 1990 a chemical analysis of the pottery in question showed that 50% of this lot came from the workshop of La Muette in Lyon, 30% from Pisa and only 10% from Arezzo.

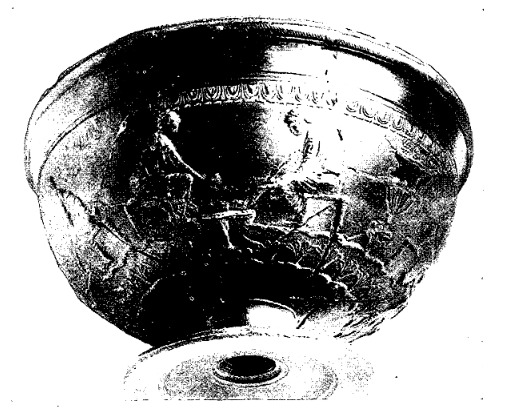
Terra sigillata cup found in the site of the encampment

It is also the first time that matched sigillata services have been described, that is to say sets of dishes paired by their shapes and profiles. S. Loeschcke identifies four types of service at Haltern, numbered I to IV - types III and IV being variants of the first two.

== Sources ==
- "Archäologische Indizien bekräftigen: Haltern war wohl das antike Aliso", lwl.org (in German), 12 August 2010
- "Ist Haltern das berühmte Aliso?", lwl-roemermuseum-haltern.de (in German), archived from the original on 13 April 2017
- "Italian-type (Arretine) sigillata", Potsherd; Atlas of Roman Pottery
- Loeschcke, Siegfried (1909), Keramische Funde in Haltern: Ein Beitrag zur Geschichte der augusteischen Kultur in Deutschland (in French), Münster: Aschendorff, pp. 90 pages
- Menzebach, Michael (2 December 2019), Vor den Toren von Aliso: Neue Ausgrabungen im römischen Gräberfeld von Haltern am See (in German)
- Vauthey, Max; Vauthey, Paul (1981), "La notion de « service » dans la sigillée du monde romain. Le service de Lvcivs de Terre-Franche (p. 233-244)", Colloques de Balbigny, Roanne et Saint-Étienne : Archéologie générale 1977-1978 (in French), Saint-Étienne: Centre d'études foréziennes, pp. 255 pages, ISBN 9782851450418
