= Ebsdorfergrund =

- Municipality
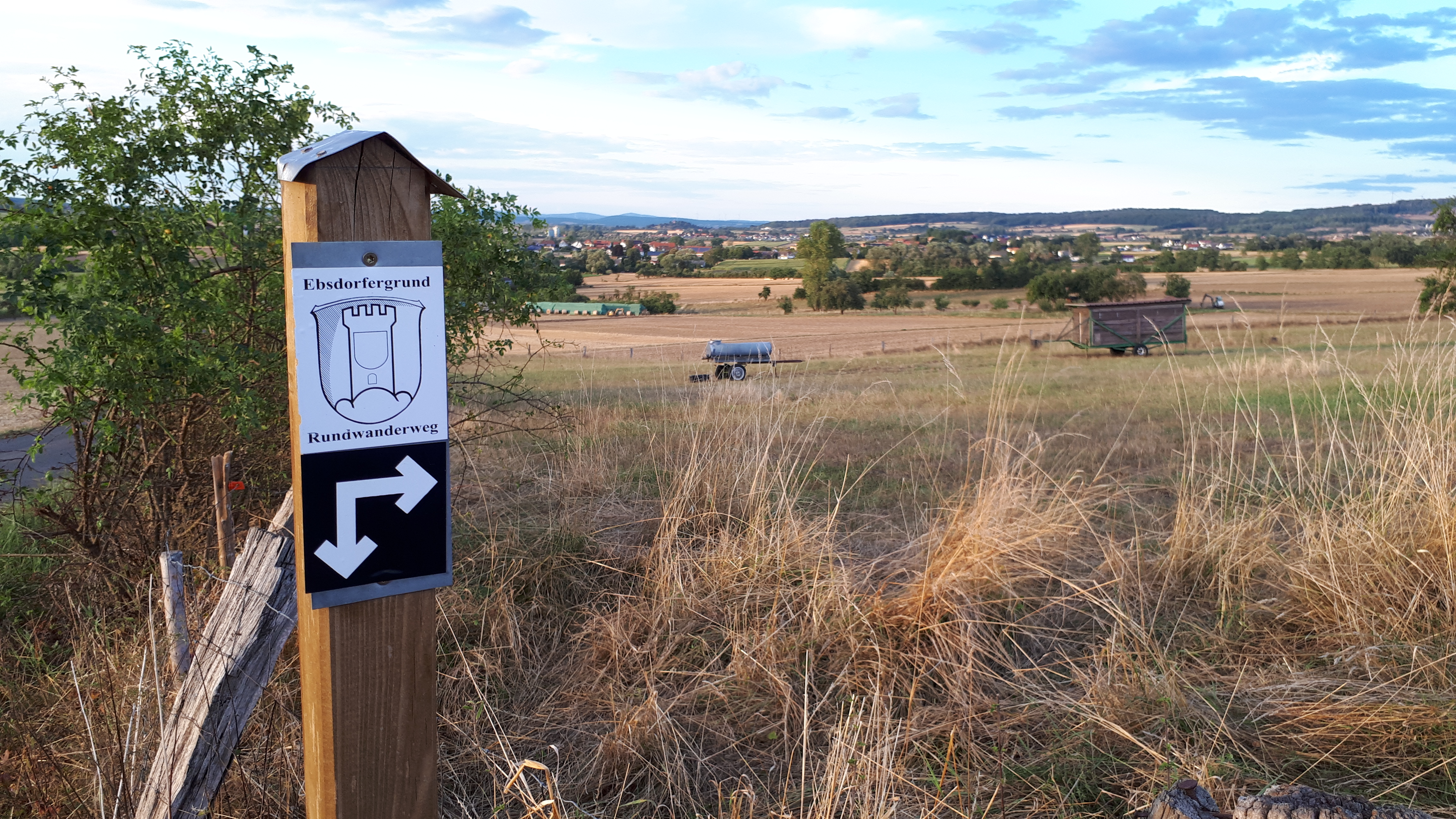
- Direction sign regarding a hiking trail in Ebsdorfergrund, Hesse, Germany

- Coat of arms

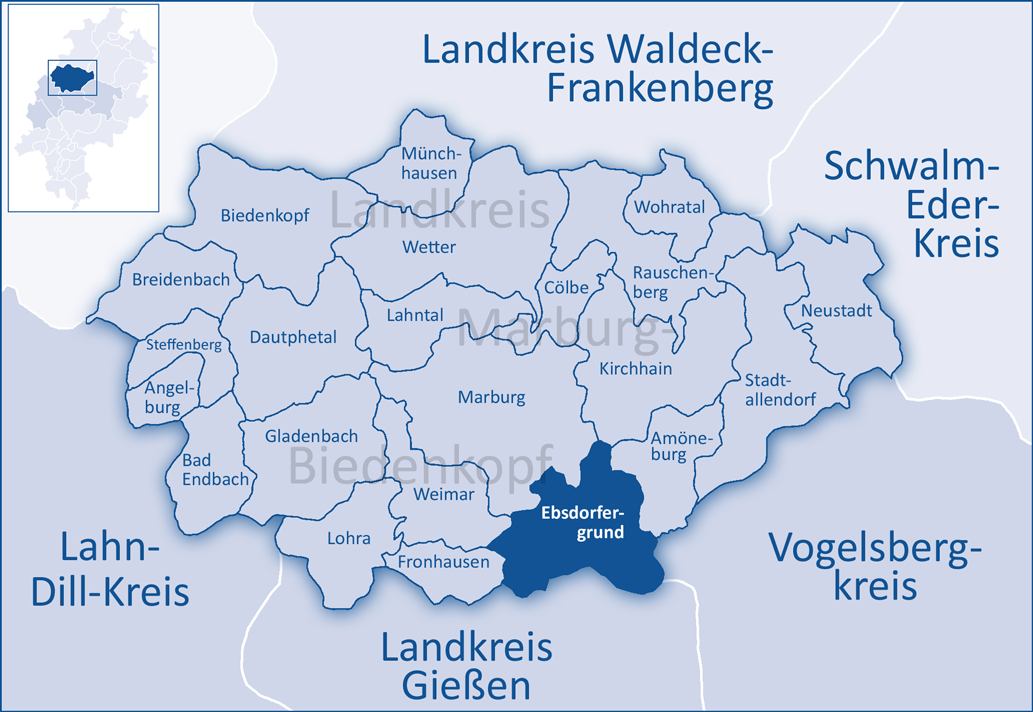
- Location of Ebsdorfergrund within Marburg-Biedenkopf district
- Interactive map of Ebsdorfergrund
- Location within Germany Location within Hesse
- Coordinates: 50°44′N 08°52′E
- Country: Germany
- State: Hesse
- Admin. region: Gießen
- District: Marburg-Biedenkopf

Government
  - Mayor (2022–28): Hanno Kern

Area
  - Total: 72.87 km^{2} (28.14 sq mi)
- Elevation: 219 m (719 ft)

Population (2025-12-31)
  - Total: 9,312
  - Density: 127.8/km^{2} (331.0/sq mi)
- Time zone: UTC+01:00 (CET)
  - Summer (DST): UTC+02:00 (CEST)
- Postal codes: 35085
- Dialling codes: 06424
- Vehicle registration: MR
- Website: www.ebsdorfergrund.de

Ebsdorfergrund (German pronunciation: [ˈɛpsdɔʁfɐˌɡʁʊnt]) is a municipality consisting of eleven villages in the southeast of Marburg-Biedenkopf district in Hesse, Germany.

The municipality's municipal area extends over the Ebsdorfer Grund in the valley of the Zwester Ohm and the areas around its edges, connecting the Amöneburg Basin with the middle Lahn valley between Marburg and Gießen.

Through the municipal area runs a highway from Fronhausen (Autobahn interchange in Gießen by Bundesstraße B 3) to Kirchhain. Another one joins Marburg with Grünberg.

The old ring railway, the Marburger Kreisbahn, which opened in 1905 and ran through the municipal area to Dreihausen, was shut down in 1972.

== Neighbouring municipalities ==
In the northwest, Ebsdorfergrund borders on the town of Marburg, in the north on the town of Kirchhain, in the northeast on the town of Amöneburg (all in Marburg-Biedenkopf) and the town of Homberg (Vogelsbergkreis), in the south on the municipality of Rabenau and the town of Allendorf, in the southwest on the town of Staufenberg (all three in Gießen district), and in the west on the municipalities of Fronhausen and Weimar (both in Marburg-Biedenkopf).

== Centres ==
The municipality consists of the following centres (Ortsteile):

- Beltershausen
- Dreihausen (Basalt quarry)
- Ebsdorf
- Hachborn
- Heskem-Mölln
- Ilschhausen
- Leidenhofen
- Rauischholzhausen (Schloss Rauischholzhausen stately home with Schlosspark owned by University of Giessen)
- Roßberg
- Wermertshausen
- Wittelsberg

== Politics ==
=== Municipal council ===
As of municipal elections held on 26 March 2006, seats on the municipal council are apportioned thus:

SPD	9 seats	CDU	17 seats
Free Voters (citizens' coalition)	4 seats
Greens	1 seat

== Coat of arms ==
The municipality's municipal coat of arms might be described as: Or, on a three-knolled hill vert a crenellated tower gules, therein the Hessian shield.

The coat of arms recalls the Wittelsberg Schanze, who served the Hessian Landgraves by watching over traffic on the road running through the Ebsdorfer Grund between areas belonging to the Ecclesiastical Principality of Mainz.

== Partnerships ==
The municipality of Ebsdorfergrund maintains partnerships with the following municipalities:

- Bidford-on-Avon, United Kingdom since 1980
- Liniewo, Poland since 1998

== Important personalities ==
- Dr. Friederike Damm, bearer of the Bundesverdienstkreuz am Bande (bestowed 2 December 2005)
