= Rabenau =

Rabenau may refer to two places in Germany:

- Rabenau, Saxony
- Rabenau, Hesse
