= Lohra, Germany =

- Municipality
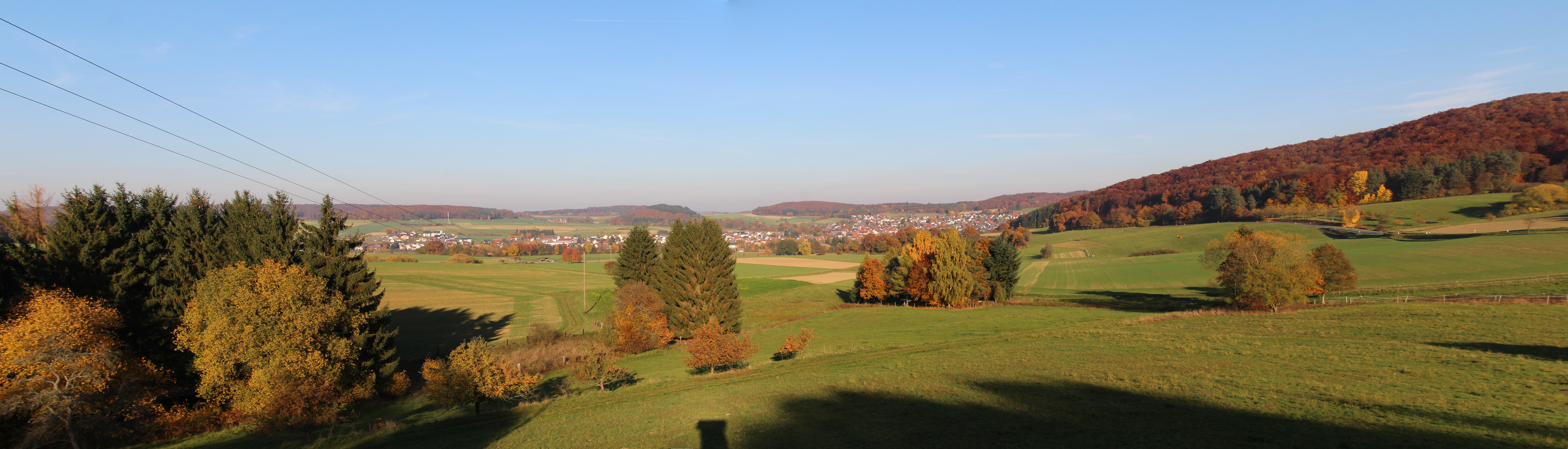

- Coat of arms

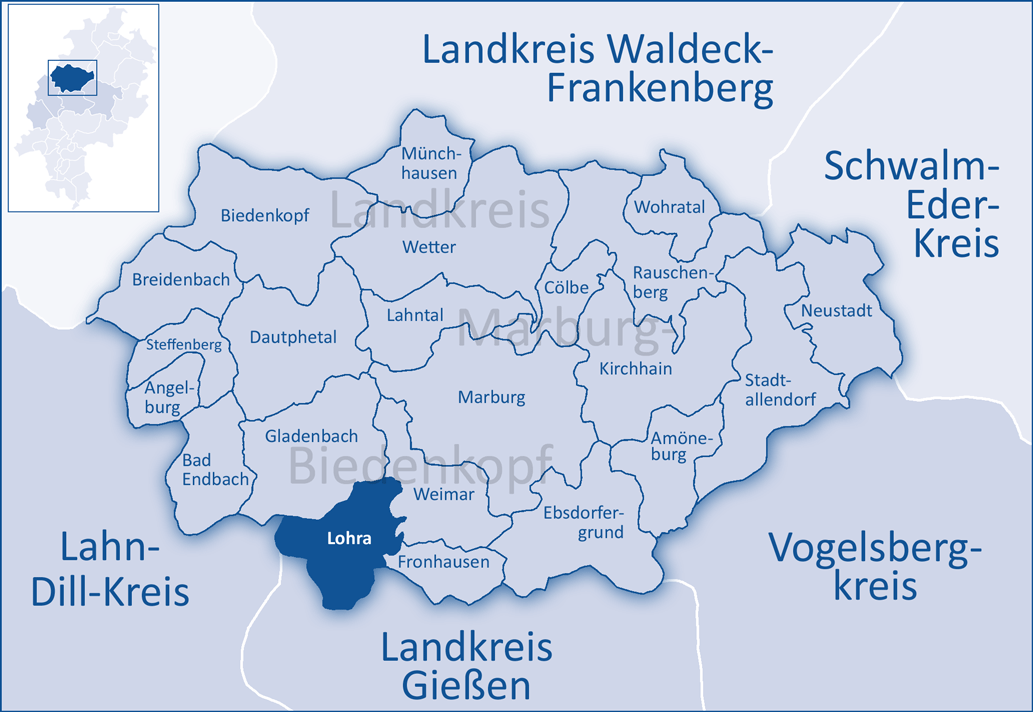
- Location of Lohra, Germany within Marburg-Biedenkopf district
- Interactive map of Lohra, Germany
- Location within Germany Location within Hesse
- Coordinates: 50°45′N 08°40′E
- Country: Germany
- State: Hesse
- Admin. region: Gießen
- District: Marburg-Biedenkopf

Government
  - Mayor (2017–23): Georg Gaul (Ind.)

Area
  - Total: 49.16 km^{2} (18.98 sq mi)
- Elevation: 210 m (690 ft)

Population (2025-12-31)
  - Total: 5,849
  - Density: 119.0/km^{2} (308.2/sq mi)
- Time zone: UTC+01:00 (CET)
  - Summer (DST): UTC+02:00 (CEST)
- Postal codes: 35102
- Dialling codes: 06462 oder 06426
- Vehicle registration: MR
- Website: www.lohra.de

Lohra (German pronunciation: [ˈloːʁa]) is a municipality in Marburg-Biedenkopf district in the administrative region of Gießen in Hesse, Germany.

== Geography ==
Lohra's municipal area, measuring 49 km², stretches across the middle Salzböde valley and the Versgrund. Among its neighbouring municipalities are Weimar an der Lahn in the northeast, Fronhausen in the southeast and in the northwest Gladenbach, all in the Marburg-Biedenkopf district, as well as the town of Lollar, Wettenberg and Biebertal in Gießen district, and Bischoffen in Lahn-Dill district.

The municipality of Lohra is found in the so-called Marburger Land. Together with the municipalities of Fronhausen, Weimar and Ebsdorfergrund, Lohra forms the southern part of Marburg-Biedenkopf. The municipality of Lohra is sometimes wrongly said to be part of the Hessisches Hinterland, but not even any of the old villages now belonging to Lohra were part of the old Biedenkopf district, and therefore they were not part of the Hinterland; they had been part of the old Marburg district since days of yore.

Lohra has a population of 6,800, 2,554 of those in the namesake constituent municipality (as of late 2005).

== municipality divisions ==
The municipality includes the following constituent municipalities:

- Altenvers (about 602 inhabitants)
- Damm / Etzelmühle (about 269 inhabitants)
- Kirchvers (about 992 inhabitants)
- Lohra (about 2,554 inhabitants)
- Nanz-Willershausen (about 277 inhabitants)
- Reimershausen (about 140 inhabitants)
- Rodenhausen (about 242 inhabitants)
- Rollshausen (about 311 inhabitants)
- Seelbach und (about 78 inhabitants)
- Weipoltshausen (about 615 inhabitants)

== History ==
Witness to Lohra's early occupation is the gallery grave found at the Gernstein in 1931, which puts the earliest habitation no later than the dying days of the New Stone Age. The men, women and children buried here, whose number must have been about 20, had been burnt in a surprising way. Furthermore, unlike what has been found at other gallery graves in North Hesse, the dead were richly furnished with ceramics and other everyday objects for their trip to the hereafter. Handled beakers (which owing to their unique style have also come to be called Lohra beakers in archaeological jargon), cups, bowls, a serpentine axe, a small stone hatchet, a retouched radiolarite blade and pieces of bronze plate are all things that have been found at the site. Some of the finds have been kept at the Hesse State Museum since 1931.

At Altenvers, a Germanic settlement dating from Roman times was found in which it is highly likely that metal was processed.

Lohra was first mentioned in an entry in the goods directory of the Benedictine Monastery of Fulda in the mid 8th century, and shortly thereafter in the donation book of the Monastery of Lorsch, as "loco lare":

Gerbrechti in Larere. Regnante itaque Karolo piissimo rege, presidentque huic loco Gundelando, primo abbate tradiderunt ad Lauresham St. Nazario, Castwich et Gerbrecht, filius eius res suas in pago Logenehe in villis Larere marca (et in Duda marca) scilicet Campos, Prata, aquas aquarumque decursus.
769, Dec. 1.Karlus, Rex
Gundelando, abbas.

Translation:

Gerbrecht's (property) in Lohra. Under most pious King Charles, and under the leadership of the first abbot of this place, Gundeland, Castwich and his son Gerbrecht have at Lorsch donated to the holy Nazarius their property in the Lahn area, in the places Lohra (and in the Duda marches), namely fields, meadows, waters and waterways. 769 December 1 Charles, the King. Gundeland, the Abbot.

The name "Lare" can be traced to an Old Germanic form of speech from before Frankish, and likely means "place by the water". Who settled in Lohra before the Franks has not been settled once and for all. They were probably Celts (until about 50 BC) and after that the Germanic Chatti, later known as Hessen, who possibly raised Lohra's standing in the land.

In the 8th and 9th centuries, Lohra seems to have been home to a court of law of the Frankish region-county, known as pagus lare (Lohra region), which corresponded to the later bequest of the county of Ruchesloh.

The religious centre of this region-county seems to have been a plot of land called Retschloh (that is, Ruchesloh) near Oberweimar as well as near the Martinskirche (church) there. Also there, justice was administered. The region-county's territory reached as far as the Amöneburg Basin and the Vogelsberg Mountains, and seems to have taken in much of the later Lahn-Ohm county's lands as well.

Around 1238, the Late Romanesque church, still standing today, was built.

In Ruchesloh county, which had passed to the estate of the Archbishop of Mainz in 1237, Lohra was the hub of Gerichte Lohr, a court district (≈soke), which included roughly the Verser Grund as well as parts of today's municipality of Fronhausen. According to all useful contemporary documents, Ruchesloh county put itself together from the Zentgerichte (local courts with jurisdiction over a hundred) in the areas around Amöneburg, Buseck, Ebsdorf, Gladenbach, Homberg, Kirchberg, Kirtorf, Lohra, Londorf, Merlau and Reizberg.

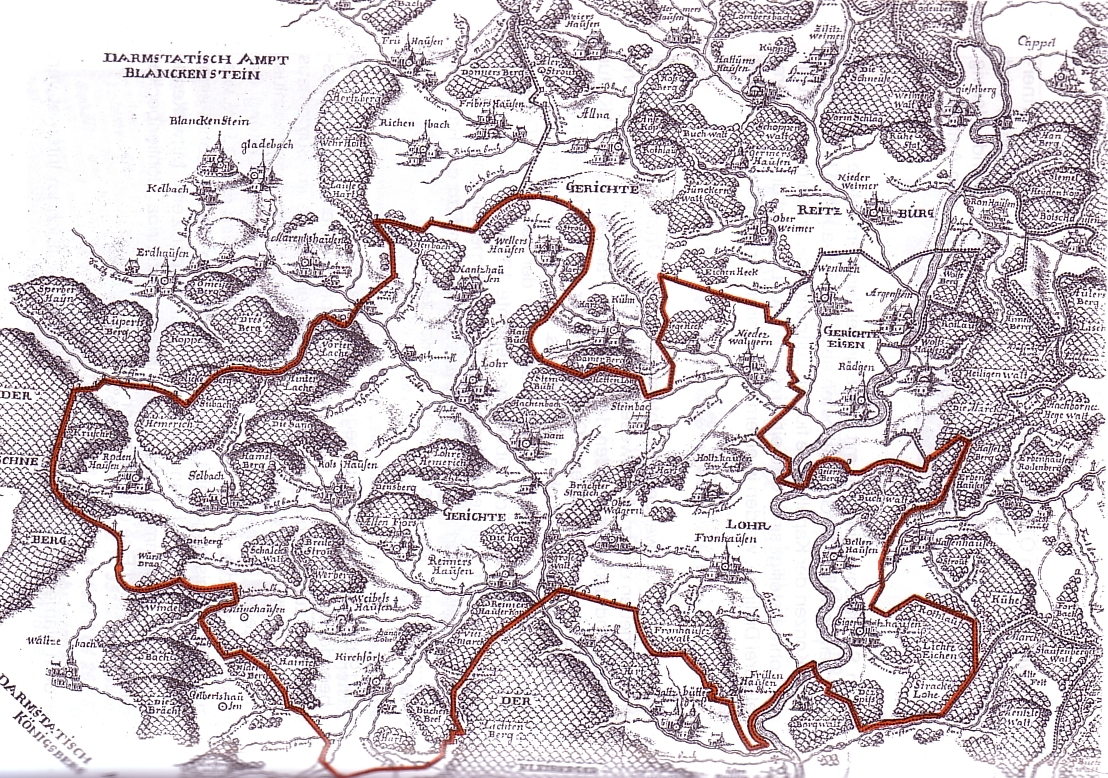
The so-called Gerichte Lohr in the late Middle Ages

In 1366, the Count of Nassau burnt Lohra down in a revenge campaign against the Hessian Landgraves. The villagers fled into the woods, while the wealthiest and most distinguished figures in the village were taken away by the Nassauers along with all the cattle to be ransomed for a great price.

After the partition of the county by Philip the Magnanimous in 1567, Lohra passed to Hesse-Marburg.

When the Swedes overran Hesse in the Thirty Years' War, it marked the onset of hard times for the villages that now make up the municipality. Many local people fled to Marburg, finding refuge in the Landgraves' castle there while their villages were sacked by marauding Landsknechte (mercenary troops). In 1648, once the Peace of Westphalia had brought the war to an end, and the so-called Hessian War had ended, the northern part of Hesse-Marburg, and therefore Lohra, passed to Hesse-Kassel (or Hesse-Cassel). At the time of the Reichsdeputationshauptschluss in 1803 and the Napoleonic Era, the municipality of Lohra was annexed by the Kingdom of Westphalia, whose capital was Kassel, and whose ruler was Napoleon's brother Jérôme Bonaparte. After Napoleon's downfall, Landgrave Wilhelm took over the leadership of Hesse-Kassel as Elector.

In 1866, Kurhessen, as Hesse-Kassel was known under the Elector ("Kurfürst"), and thereby also the villages now in Lohra, were annexed by Prussia, and along with the likewise absorbed Nassau were made into the Prussian province of Hesse-Nassau.

Even before the First World War, the way was being paved that would see Lohra turn from a mostly farming municipality to a worker municipality, a process that continued in the years between the wars.

In 1946, owing to the great number of Germans driven out of the lost territories east of the Oder and Neiße, the number of inhabitants rose by a healthy proportion given the available room for settling.

In 1952, the local anthem Lohra über'm Wiesengrund was composed by Dr. Reinnhard Ide for the 1,200th anniversary celebration of the village's first documentary mention in 752. The lyrics come from Wilhelm Ide.

Since 1972 and 1974, the formerly independent municipalities of Lohra, Damm, Nanz-/Willershausen, Rodenhausen, Reimershausen, Kirchvers, Altenvers, Weipoltshausen, Rollshausen and Seelbach have formed today's greater municipality of Lohra.

In 2002, Lohra observed the 1,250th anniversary of its first documentary mention with a festival week.

== Coat of arms ==
The civic coat of arms, which was bestowed on the municipality on the occasion of its 1,200th anniversary, might be described thus: Party per fess, above, in Or spangled with shingles azure a lion rampant azure armed and langued gules; below, in azure a saltire Or interspersed with twelve little crosses.

The lion stands for the Counts of Solms, and the saltire (X-shaped cross), with an altered colour scheme, for the Lords of Merenberg.

== Politics ==
=== Mayor ===
Since April 2005 Georg Gaul (independent) has been mayor of Lohra. He succeeded Hermann Brand (SPD), who did not seek a further mandate owing to age.

=== Council ===
Since the last municipal election on 31 March 2021, the seats in the municipal parliament have been apportioned thus:

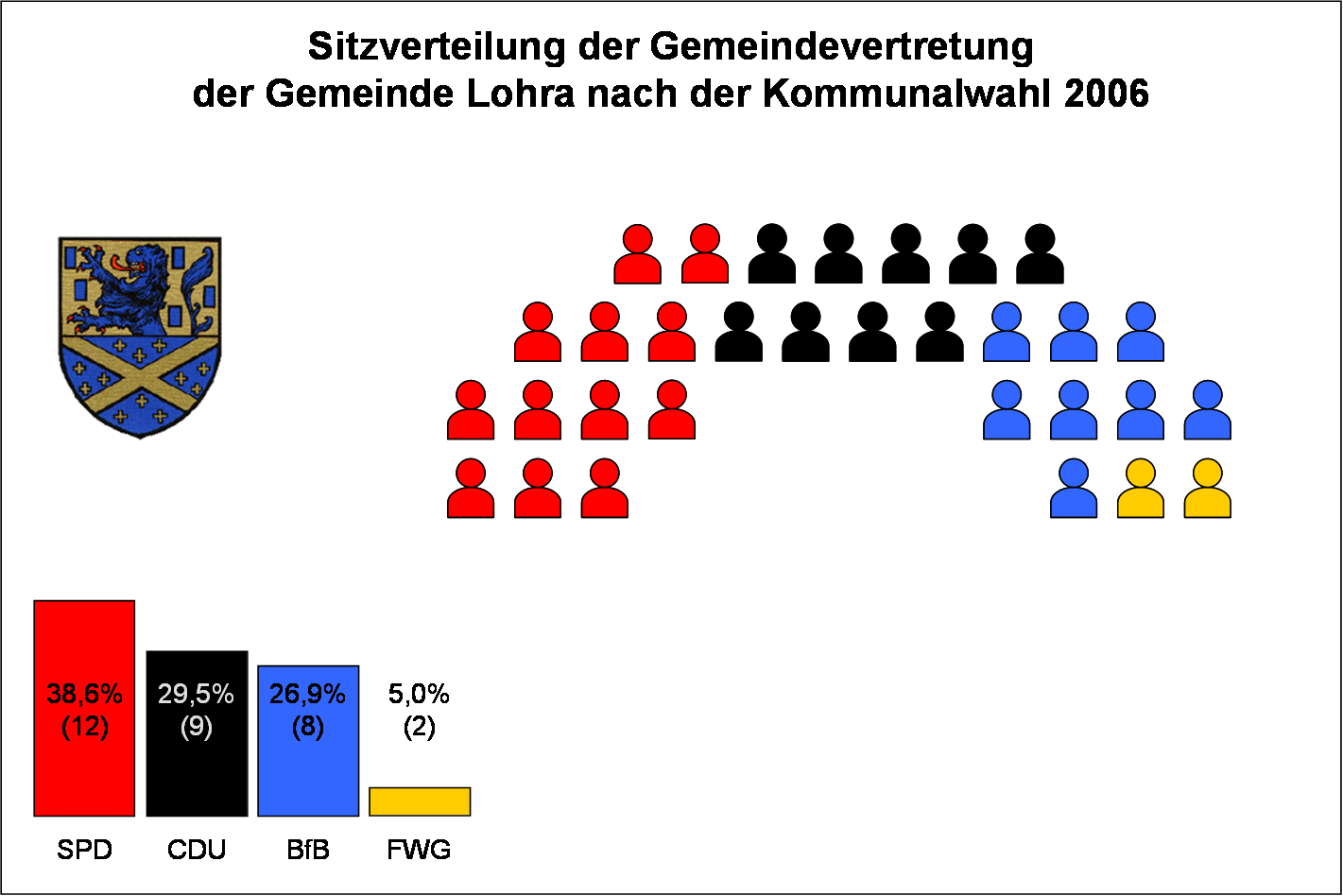
Distribution of seats on Lohra's municipal council after the 2006 municipal election

Parties and voter municipalities		Share in %	Seats
BfB	Bündnis für Bürgernähe (citizens' coalition)	44.0	14
CDU	Christian Democratic Union (Germany)	22.3	7
SPD	Social Democratic Party of Germany	21.4	6
Grüne	BÜNDNIS 90/DIE GRÜNEN	12.4	4
total		100	31

== Economy, infrastructure and transport ==
Through the northern part of the municipal area runs the Federal Highway (Bundesstraße) 255 between Marburg and Herborn. Meanwhile, the Aar-Salzböde railway leading between Niederwalgern and Herborn has been abandoned.

The rails from the disused railway were torn up early in 2006 under mysterious circumstances and some were carted off. The Lithuanian man to whom the illegal job had been entrusted was meanwhile seized, whereas no trace of his "wirepullers" has yet been found.

Since 10 August 2005 there has been in Lohra a Funk-W-DSL service that is unique in the country, and through which outlying municipalities are also served.

== Education ==
Each of the municipality's three biggest centres, Lohra, Kirchvers and Altenvers, has a kindergarten. The ones in Lohra and Kirchvers are run by the Evangelical Church of Kurhessen-Waldeck, whereas the one in Altenvers is under municipal management.

The municipality moreover has a primary school at its disposal. Higher schools such as Gymnasien, Realschulen and Hauptschulen are to be found in Marburg, Niederwalgern, Gladenbach, Biebertal and Gießen.

Higher learning opportunities are to be had in the surrounding district at universities and Fachhochschulen in Marburg, Gießen and Kassel.

== Daughters and sons of the municipality ==
- Heinrich Naumann, regional poet from Nanzhausen
- Walter Schäfer, former board chairman of the Hessian-Thuringian State Bank (Helaba)

== Partnerships ==
The municipality of Lohra maintains partnerships with the following municipalities:

- (Germany) Herges–Hallenberg, Thuringia
- Vivonne near Poitiers, France
- Dziemany, Poland

== Literature ==
- Huth, Karl: Die Gemeinde Lohra und ihre 10 Ortsteile im Wandel der Jahrhunderte, 1989
- Kaiserzeitliche Siedlung bei Altenvers
