= Gladenbach =

- Town
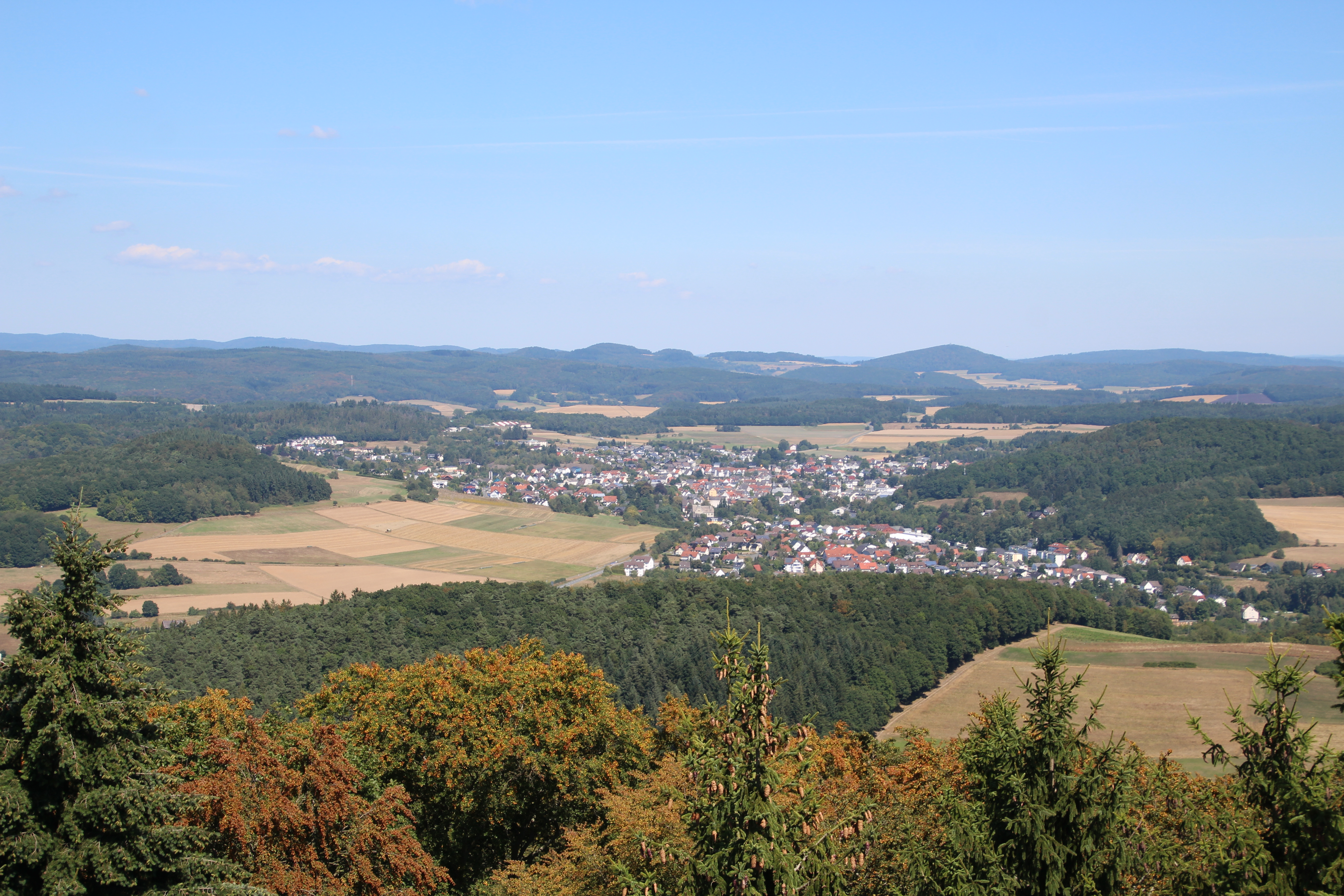
- Gladenbach from Koppe-Tower

- Coat of arms

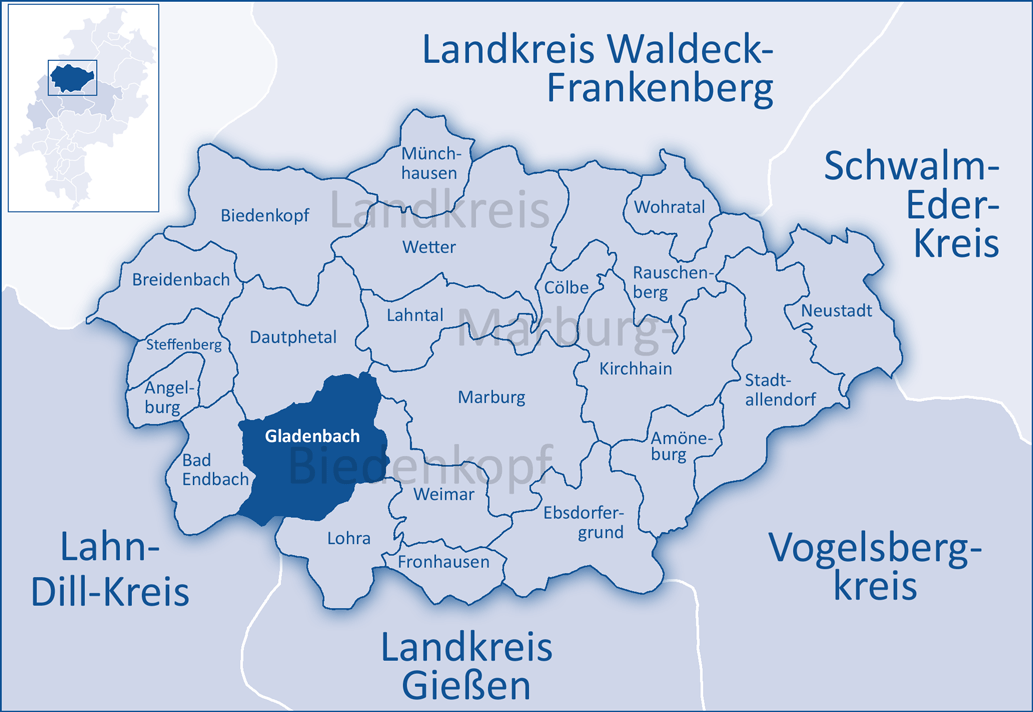
- Location of Gladenbach within Marburg-Biedenkopf district
- Interactive map of Gladenbach
- Location within Germany Location within Hesse
- Coordinates: 50°46′5″N 8°34′58″E
- Country: Germany
- State: Hesse
- Admin. region: Gießen
- District: Marburg-Biedenkopf
- Subdivisions: 15 Stadtteile

Government
  - Mayor (2020–26): Peter Kremer (Ind.)

Area
  - Total: 72.28 km^{2} (27.91 sq mi)
- Elevation: 262 m (860 ft)

Population (2025-12-31)
  - Total: 12,377
  - Density: 171.2/km^{2} (443.5/sq mi)
- Time zone: UTC+01:00 (CET)
  - Summer (DST): UTC+02:00 (CEST)
- Postal codes: 35075
- Dialling codes: 06462
- Vehicle registration: MR
- Website: www.gladenbach.de

Gladenbach (German pronunciation: [ˈɡlaːdn̩bax]) is a town in Hesse, Germany, in the west of Marburg-Biedenkopf district.

== Geography ==
=== Location ===
The town of Gladenbach lies on the eastern edge of the Westerwald in the Hessian Highland (Bergland). This part of the Lahn-Dill Highland is often also called the Gladenbach Uplands. This has arisen from the great degree of correspondence between today's municipal area and the area covered by the historical Amt of Blankenstein, the eastsoutheastern part of the so-called Hessian Hinterland and the later, albeit now former, Biedenkopf district.

Within the bounds of the municipality's southern centres of Weidenhausen, Erdhausen, Gladenbach and Mornshausen runs the river Salzböde, which rises in Bad Endbach and flows through the municipal area, then running farther eastwards through the municipalities of Lohra, Fronhausen and Lollar, where it empties into the Lahn at Odenhausen. Farther north in Gladenbach, mostly west–east through the centres of Runzhausen, Bellnhausen, Sinkershausen, Frohnhausen and Friebertshausen runs another river, the Allna, which flows onwards to Weimar, likewise emptying into the Lahn. The two waterways are separated from each other by high ridges which even make for a local drainage divide where smaller streams are concerned. Nonetheless, the town of Gladenbach as a whole is commonly said to lie in the Salzböde valley.

An important east–west traffic thoroughfare in Gladenbach is the Federal Highway (Bundesstraße) 255 crossing the municipal area from Marburg through the constituent municipalities of Weimar and Lohra, leaving the municipal area at Weidenhausen in the area of the Zollbuche ("Customs Beech" – it once marked the border between Hesse-Darmstadt and Hesse-Nassau) southwestwards towards the municipality of Bischoffen in Lahn-Dill district. The highway runs thence alongside the Aartalsee (a reservoir) on to Herborn, ending at Montabaur. Bundesstraße 453 ends within the town of Gladenbach after running through the municipality of Dautphetal to the north and Gladenbach's constituent municipality of Runzhausen.

The Aar-Salzböde-Bahn, a single-track railway line that ran through the municipal area along the Salzböde valley, has been in desuetude since 1995, and owing to a level crossing being torn up at Weidenhausen, meagre maintenance and the resulting overgrowth by bushes and trees, the line has also largely fallen apart.

=== Neighbouring municipalities ===
In the north, Gladenbach borders on the municipality of Dautphetal, in the northeast on the town of Marburg, in the east on the municipality of Weimar, in the southeast on the municipality of Lohra (all in Marburg-Biedenkopf), in the southwest on the municipality of Bischoffen (Lahn-Dill-Kreis), and in the west on the municipality of Bad Endbach (Marburg-Biedenkopf).

=== Town divisions ===
Gladenbach's municipal area is divided into 15 constituent municipalities (Stadtteile).

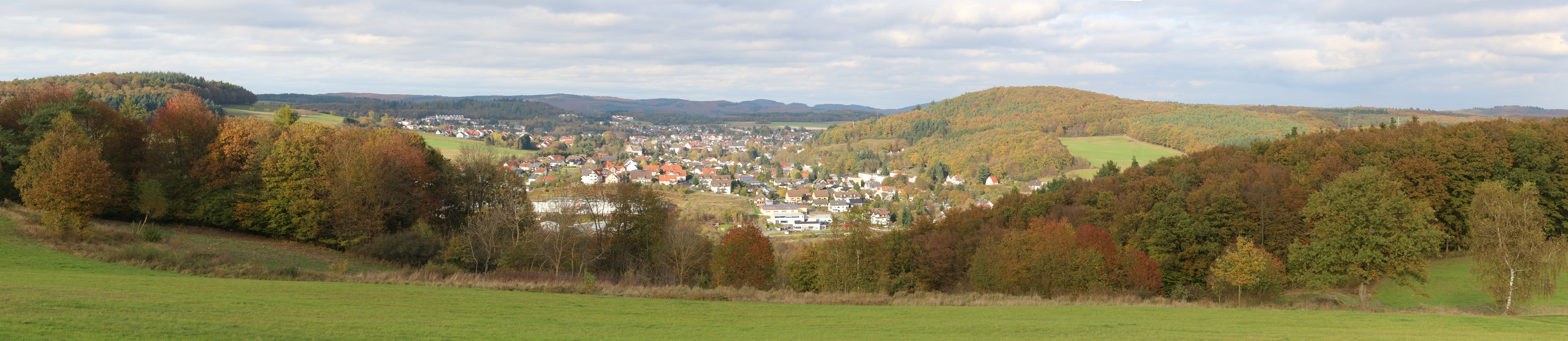
Gladenbach from south

- Weidenhausen
- Gladenbach
- Kehlnbach
- Erdhausen
- Römershausen
- Rachelshausen
- Runzhausen
- Bellnhausen
- Sinkershausen
- Diedenshausen
- Weitershausen
- Frohnhausen
- Friebertshausen
- Rüchenbach
- Mornshausen

== History ==
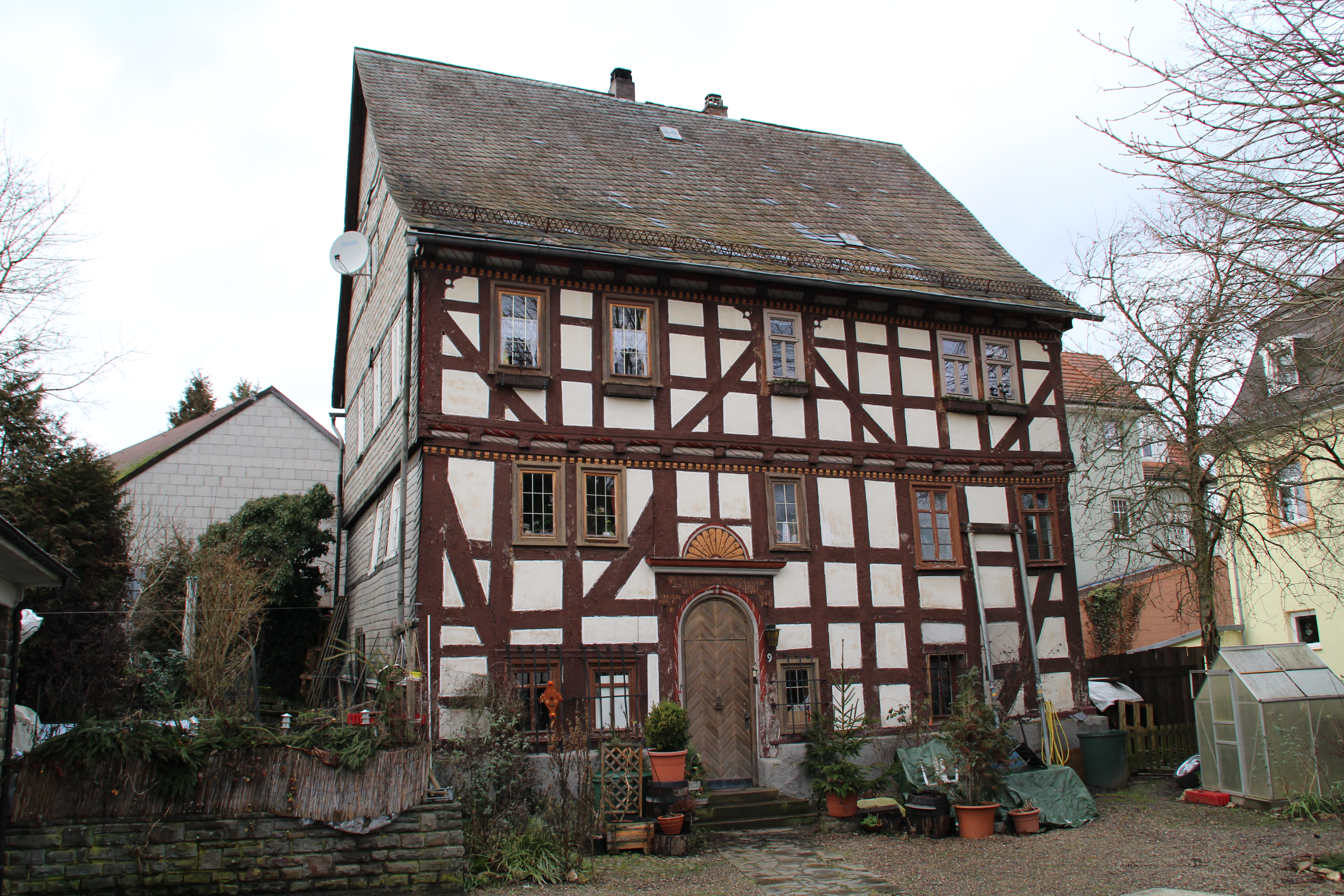
Gladenbach

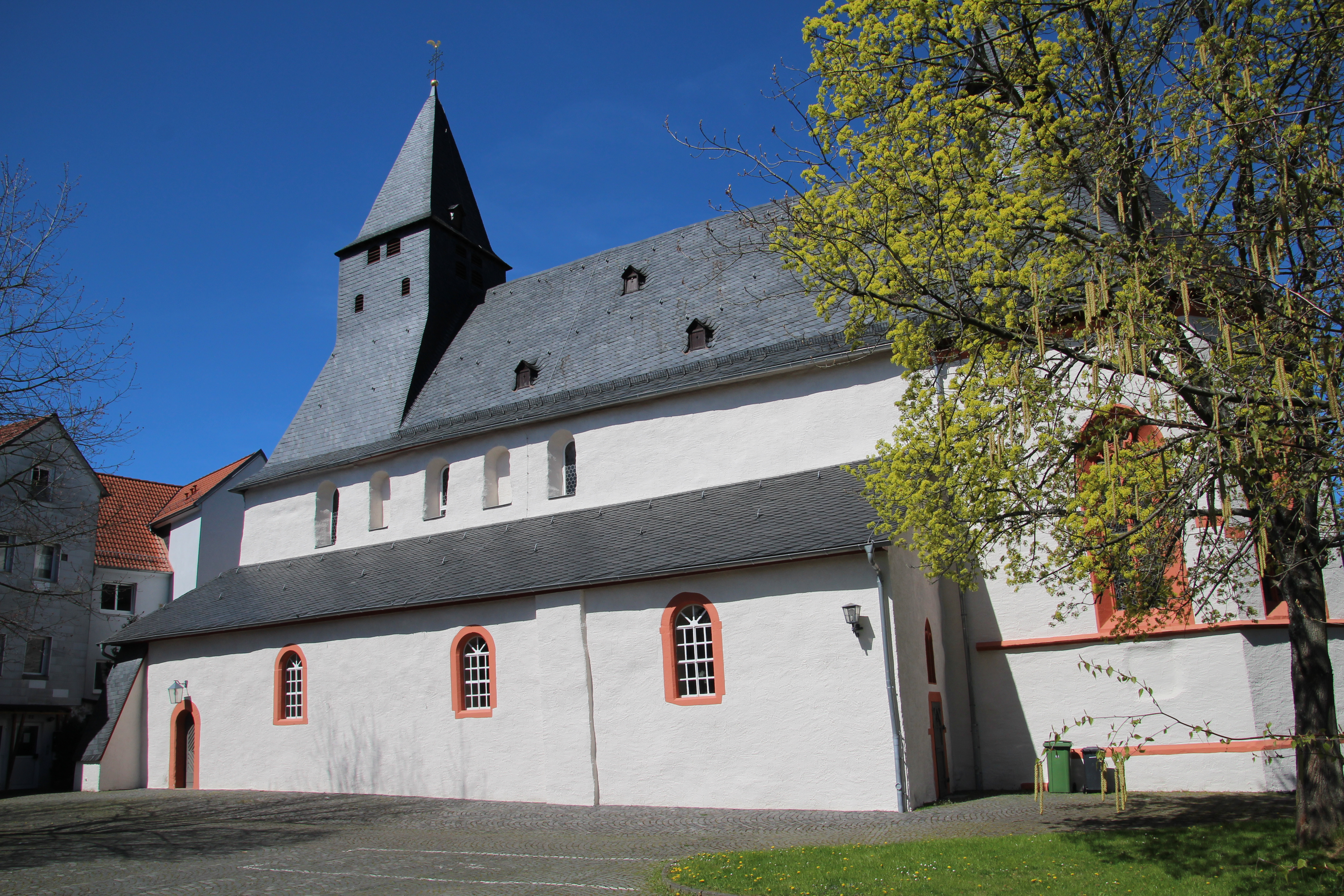
Martinskirche (Martin church)Gladenbach

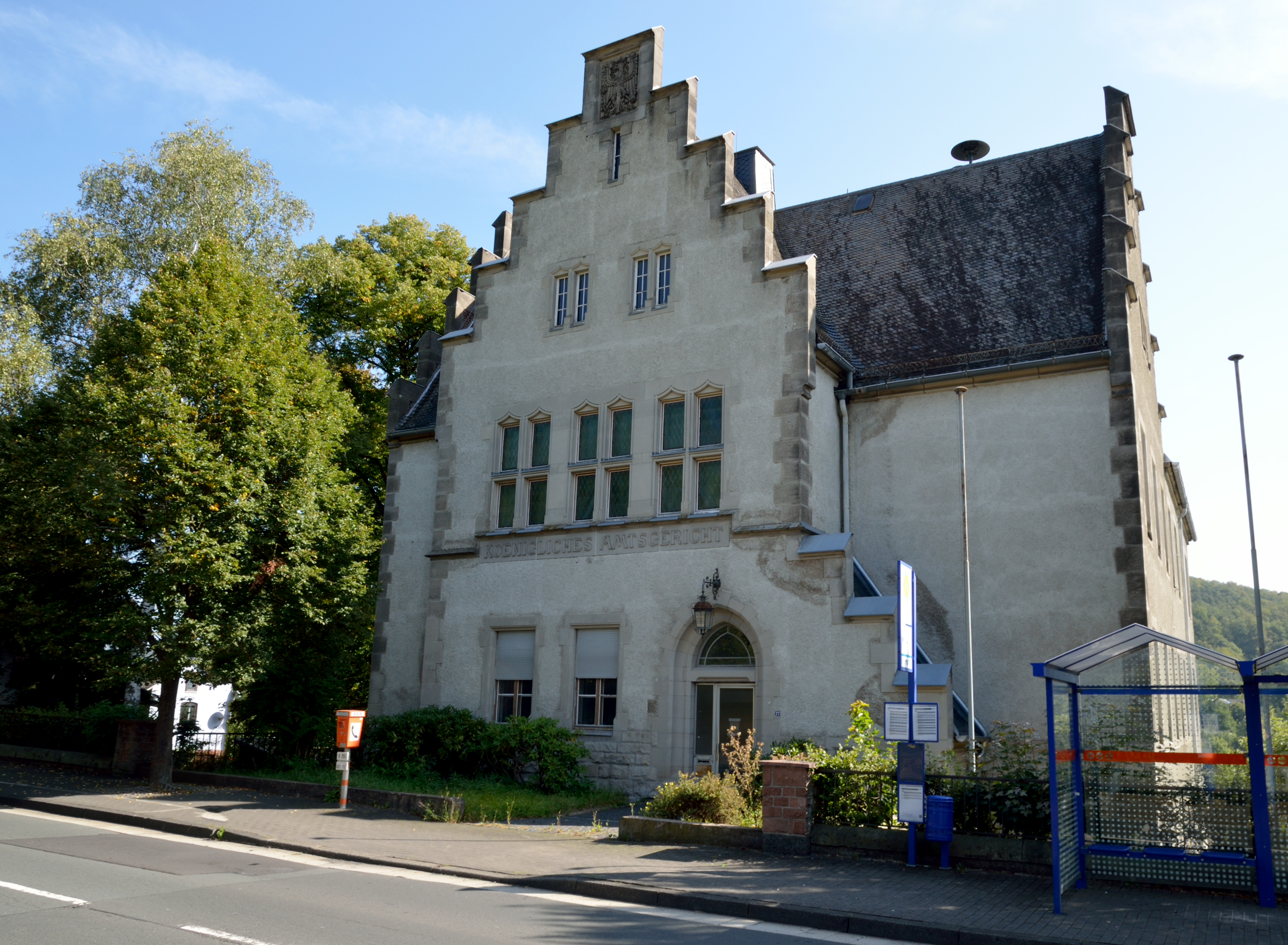
Former district court

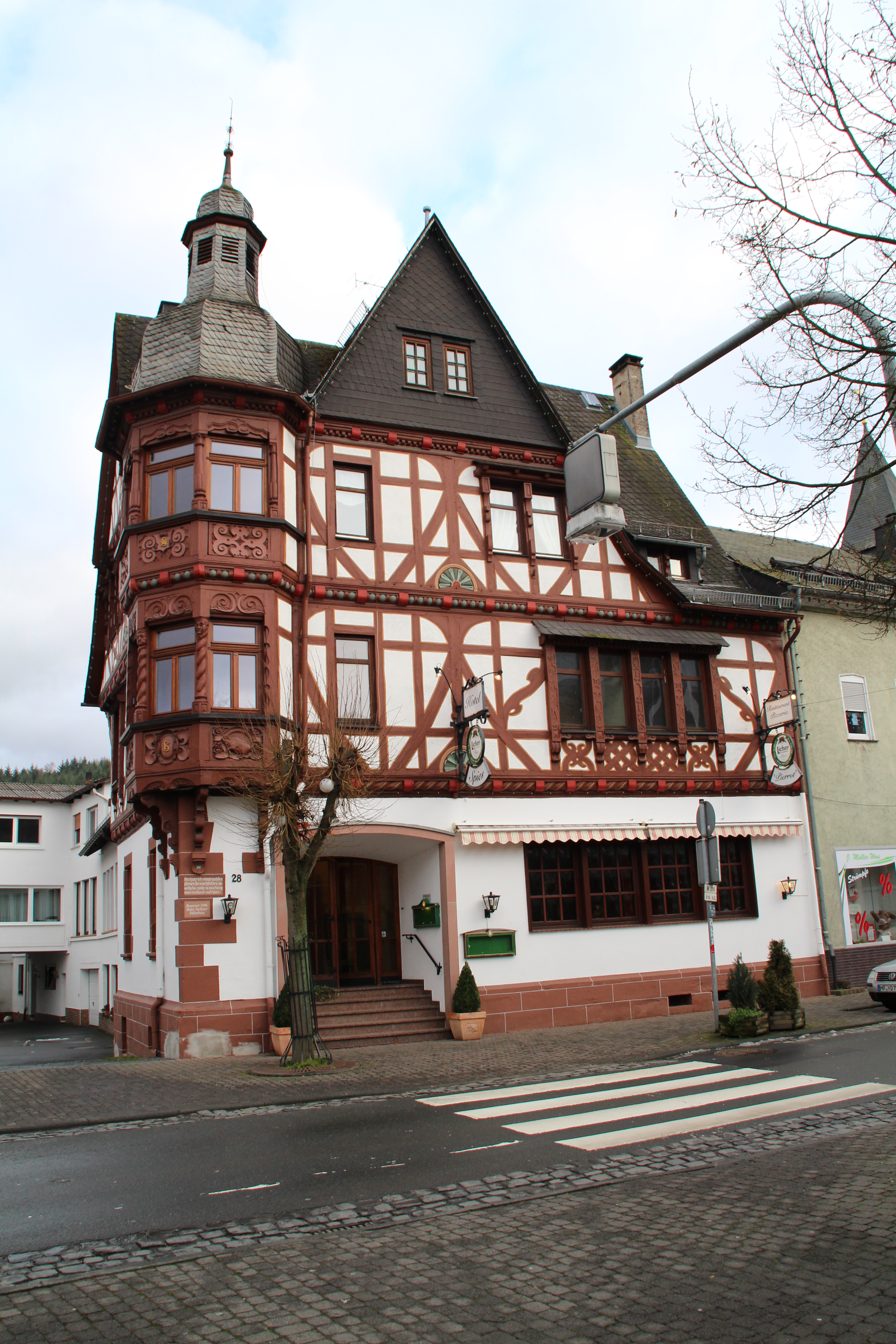
Gladenbach

=== Amalgamations ===
- 1972 Runzhausen
- 1974 through municipal reform:
  - from the former Biedenkopf district:
    - Bellnhausen
    - Diedenshausen
    - Erdhausen
    - Friebertshausen
    - Frohnhausen
    - Kehlnbach
    - Mornshausen
    - Rachelshausen
    - Römershausen
    - Rüchenbach
    - Sinkershausen
    - Weidenhausen
  - from the former Marburg a.d.Lahn district:
    - Weitershausen

=== The postal robbery in the Subach ===
Within Gladenbach's current municipal area, between Mornshausen and Erdhausen, the so-called Postraub in der Subach took place in 1822. A gang of poor farmers and poachers robbed a money-bearing mail coach running between Gladenbach and Gießen in a narrow pass above a small brook called the Subach, making off with the then unheard-of sum of more than 10,000 Gulden. These details and others are contained in a contemporary police report, which also laid the groundwork for the German made-for-TV film The Sudden Wealth of the Poor People of Kombach (1971) by Volker Schlöndorff.

== Politics ==
=== Town council ===
As of municipal elections held on 6 March 2016, town council seats are apportioned thus:

CDU	12 seats
SPD	13 seats
FW (Free voters)	9 seats
Young List/The Greens	3 seats

=== Coat of arms ===
The town's coat of arms might be described thus: Party per fess, above in azure the Hessian lion rampant striped in argent and gules armed Or crowned Or langued gules, below in vert a saltire Or.

The lion is an emblem of the town's early affiliation with Hesse, and the saltire (X-shaped cross) stands for the influence wielded before this time by the Lords of Merenberg.

=== Town partnerships ===
- Monteux, France (1987)
- (Germany) Bad Tabarz, Thuringia (1991)
- Niemcza, Poland (1998)
- Londerzeel, Belgium (2010)

=== Demonstrations ===
In 2004, there were four marches, declared legal but guarded by great police presence, by neo-Nazis from outside the town, which set off even bigger counterdemonstrations. In the end, the citizens' league, a group created at the instigation of headmaster Siegfried Seyler uniting churches, Jusos, DGBers and ordinary citizens, made an appeal. The centres for this rightwing extremism were Gladenbach, Kirtorf (Vogelsberg) and Marburg. The biggest rightwing extremist group with about 30 rightwing extremists and a large body of sympathizers was the Aktionsbündnis Mittelhessen (Middle Hesse Action League; ABM), a fusion of regional "free comradeships". Late in 2004, the ABM dissolved itself unilaterally to get around a ban imposed by the Hessian Interior Ministry. The activists resumed their activities in other neo-Nazi groups. The ABM was the most active and biggest neo-Nazi group in Hesse.

== Culture and sightseeing ==
=== Regular events ===
- Gladenbacher Kirschenmarkt (Cherry Market) (first weekend in July)
- Gladenbacher Brunnenmarkt (Wellmarket) (third Sunday in October)

== Notable residents ==
=== Sons and daughters of the town ===
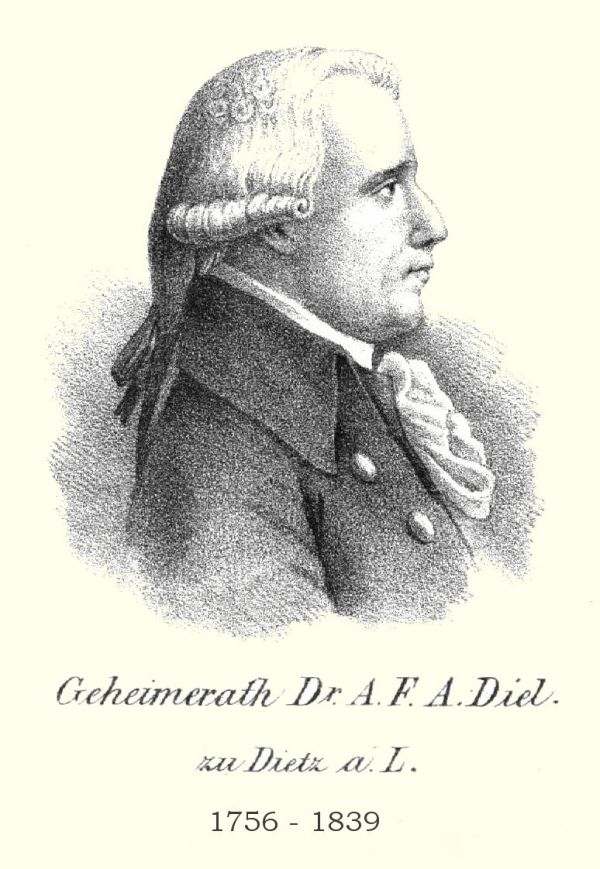
Adrian Diel

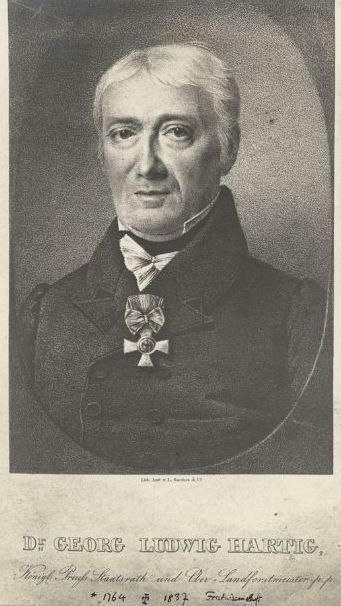
Georg Ludwig Hartig

- Johann Christoph Stockhausen (1725-1784), pedagogue and a Lutheran theologian
- Adrian Diel (1756-1833), physician and significant pomo
- Georg Ludwig Hartig (1764–1837), forestry scientist.
- Ludwig Hüffell (1784–1856), Prelate of the Baden State Church
- Ferdinand Werner (1876–1961), State President and Minister-president of the People's State of Hesse
- Ludwig Runzheimer (1912–1946), German Nazi Gestapo officer executed for war crimes

=== Other people connected with the town ===
- William III, Landgrave of Hesse, (1471-1500), called the Younger, Landgraf of Hesse, was born on 8 September 1471 on Castle Blankenstein
- Volker Schlöndorff, (born 1939), filmmaker, see History
