= Weimar (Lahn) =

- Municipality
- Coat of arms

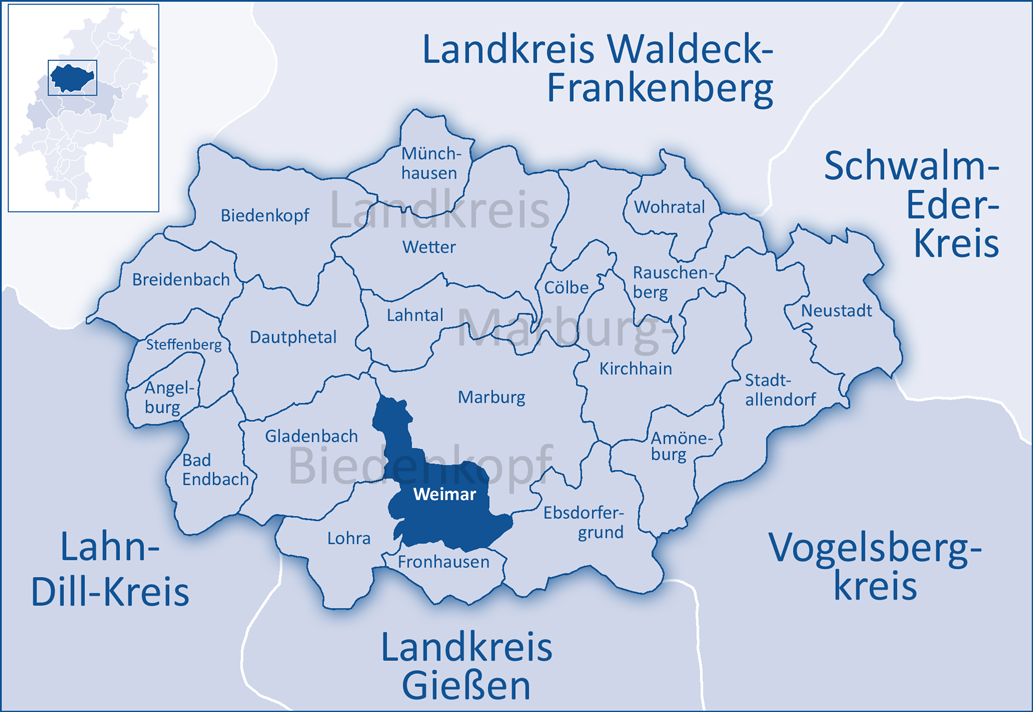
- Location of Weimar within Marburg-Biedenkopf district
- Interactive map of Weimar
- Location within Germany Location within Hesse
- Coordinates: 50°45′N 08°42′E
- Country: Germany
- State: Hesse
- Admin. region: Gießen
- District: Marburg-Biedenkopf

Government
  - Mayor (2022–28): Markus Herrmann

Area
  - Total: 47.05 km^{2} (18.17 sq mi)
- Elevation: 195–250 m (640–820 ft)

Population (2025-12-31)
  - Total: 7,288
  - Density: 154.9/km^{2} (401.2/sq mi)
- Time zone: UTC+01:00 (CET)
  - Summer (DST): UTC+02:00 (CEST)
- Postal codes: 35096
- Dialling codes: 06421, 06426
- Vehicle registration: MR
- Website: www.weimar-lahn.de

Weimar (German pronunciation: [ˈvaɪmaʁ]) is a municipality in the south of Marburg-Biedenkopf district in Gießen administrative region, Hesse, Germany. The municipality's administrative seat is the centre of Niederweimar.

== Geography ==
The municipal area stretches south from Marburg in the Lahn valley and west with the Allna valley on into the Gladenbach Highland and comprises an area of about 47 km². Other than Marburg, the municipality also borders on Ebsdorfergrund to the east, on Fronhausen to the south, on Lohra to the southwest, and in the far west on the town of Gladenbach.

== History ==
The name Weimar is believed to come from the Old Germanic word wih (holy, sanctified) and the Old High German word mar (lake, swamp or moor) put together.

Allna had its first documentary mention as early as 807 and is thereby the earliest named centre in the municipality. Alongside this, however, Kehna, Oberweimar and Niederweimar, simply from their names, are said to be the oldest centres in the municipal area. The founding of the Martinskirche (church) in Oberweimar is assumed to have happened before Saint Boniface's time, namely about 600, in the time when Irish-Scottish monks were undertaking missionary work in the area.

Over the last few years, as the gravel quarry at Niederweimar has been expanded, great Neolithic settlements have been found, which have since been kept in protective pits.

=== Earlier divisions ===
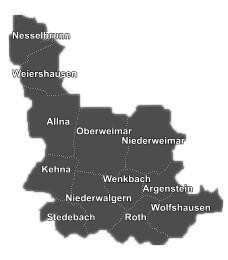
Weimar's constituent municipalities

Before the current municipality was founded, the places within it belonged to court regions (Gerichtsbezirke) which also had administrative functions. Allna, Oberweimar, Weiershausen, Kehna, Nesselbrunn, Niederwalgern and Wolfshausen belonged to the Gericht Reizberg. The Reizberg court itself was built on a mountain lying near Oberweimar. Argenstein, Wenkbach and Roth were grouped into the Gericht Schenkisch Eigen of the Schenken (≈stewards) of Schweinsberg. Stedebach was under the Teutonic Knights' ownership while Niederweimar was a landgrave's personal court region (Eigengericht).

=== Greater Weimar municipality ===
At its founding on 1 January 1971, the municipality of Weimar consisted of Allna (half-timbered church), Niederweimar (Weimar Lake) and Oberweimar (Evangelical church). On 1 July 1972, after much drawn-out procedural business, Roth (renovated synagogue), Weiershausen and Wenkbach (Evangelical Wehrkirche – a church built to look like a fort – and Catholic church) joined the municipality. As a result of Hesse's municipal reforms on 1 July 1974, the municipality was enlarged by having Argenstein (mill), Kehna (court ensemble), Nesselbrunn, Niederwalgern (Wehrkirche), Stedebach and Wolfshausen added to it.

== Politics ==
=== Municipal council ===
The local elections on 6 March 2016 and formerly on 27 March 2011 yielded the following results:

Parties and voting blocks		% 2016	Seats 2016	% 2011	Seats 2011	% 2006	Seats 2006
SPD	Social Democratic Party of Germany	34.94	8	35.1	11	35.0	11
CDU	Christian Democratic Union	26.05	6	29.1	9	35.2	11
FBW	Freie Bürgerliste Weimar (citizens' coalition)	23.71	6	15.9	5	14.6	4
Greens	Alliance '90/The Greens	9.2	2	14.7	4	8.6	3
FDP	Free Democratic Party	6.11	1	5.1	2	6.6	2
Total		100	23	100	31	100	31
Turnout in %		54.03		56.4		55.5	

=== Mayor ===
The mayor of the town of Weimar (Lahn) since 2010 has been Peter Eidam (Independent). Volker Muth (SPD) was mayor from 2004 to 2010. He was followed by Karl Krantz (CDU), who had held the position since the founding of the municipality.

=== Coat of arms ===
The municipality's coat of arms might be described thus: Party per pale gules and argent, a rose counterchanged. The arms were bestowed on Weimar twice, on 25 January 1971 and again on 2 July 1975. The rose was chosen to stand for the municipality's flourishing.

=== municipality partnerships ===
- Sawtry, Huntingdonshire, United Kingdom
- (Germany) Wutha-Farnroda, Thuringia
- Slupca, Poland since 2005 (officially since July 2006)

== Culture and sightseeing ==
=== Buildings ===
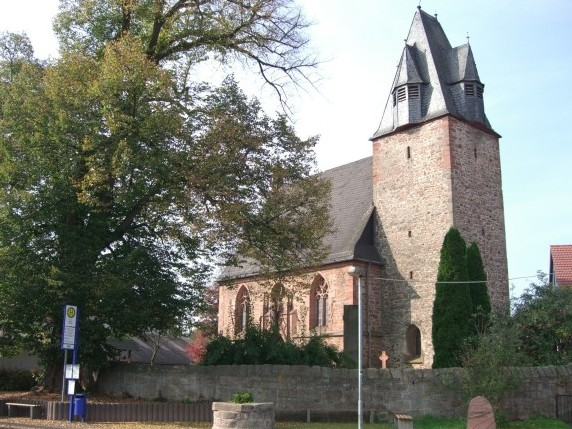
Church in Wenkbach

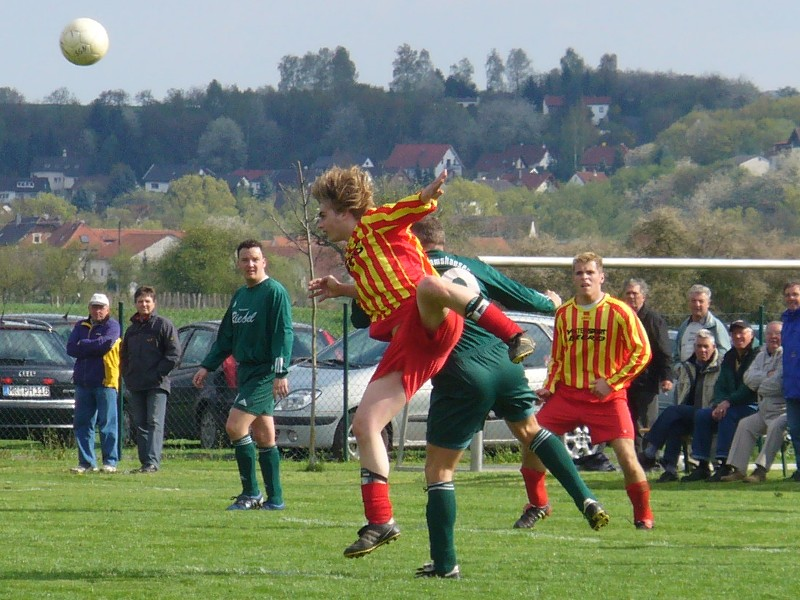
FSG Südkreis match

Among other buildings in the municipality worth seeing are the "fortress church" in Wenkbach and churches in Niederweimar, Niederwalgern, Allna and Roth. The watermill in Argenstein and the synagogue in Roth are also worth a visit, as are the half-timbered houses to be found in some centres.

=== Music ===
Various clubs in the constituent municipalities offer a range of different kinds of music. As well as several singing clubs and choirs, there are all kinds of music clubs in Weimar, even a trombone choir and the Wenkbach civic and cultural club's orchestra.

=== Sport ===
The municipality's biggest sport clubs are the SG Niederwalgern/Wenkbach, the SC Roth/Argenstein and the TSV Niederweimar. In football, the clubs from Niederwalgern, Wenkbach, Roth and Argenstein form an association and compete as FSG Südkreis. The TSV (Turn- und Sportverein, that is, gymnastic and sport club) Niederweimar has its own team. Other sports have clubs, too: tennis is offered, for example, at SG Niederwalgern/Wenkbach as well as at TV Weimar in Wolfshausen. Table tennis can be played in, among other places, in Wenkbach in the department specially set up for it at the civic and cultural club.

== Economy and infrastructure ==
=== Economy ===
The municipality's biggest industrial park is found in the southern end of Wenkbach. The firms YKK and Pauly are located there. Scattered throughout the other centres are further businesses, mostly small and in handicrafts.

=== Transport ===
Through the municipality run two Federal Highways, Bundesstraße 3 from Marburg to Gießen, which has still not been built into a four-lane highway, and Bundesstraße 255 going towards Gladenbach and Herborn. Niederwalgern station and Niederweimar station are stops on the Main-Weser Railway between Kassel and Frankfurt am Main at which stop regional and regional express trains (the latter only in Niederwalgern). Various buslines join the municipality's several centres together and to neighbouring municipalities.

=== Leisure ===
Smaller facilities such as playgrounds can be found in most of the constituent municipalities, but the only facility well known outside the region is the Seepark ("lake park"), offering a lake with swimming and a recreational area.

== Famous inhabitants ==
- Walter Schlesinger (1908-1984) - famous historian, lived and died in Wolfshausen
- Dirk Wolf (1972- ) - footballer, formerly with, among others, Eintracht Frankfurt, grew up in Argenstein
