= Zwester Ohm =

River in Germany

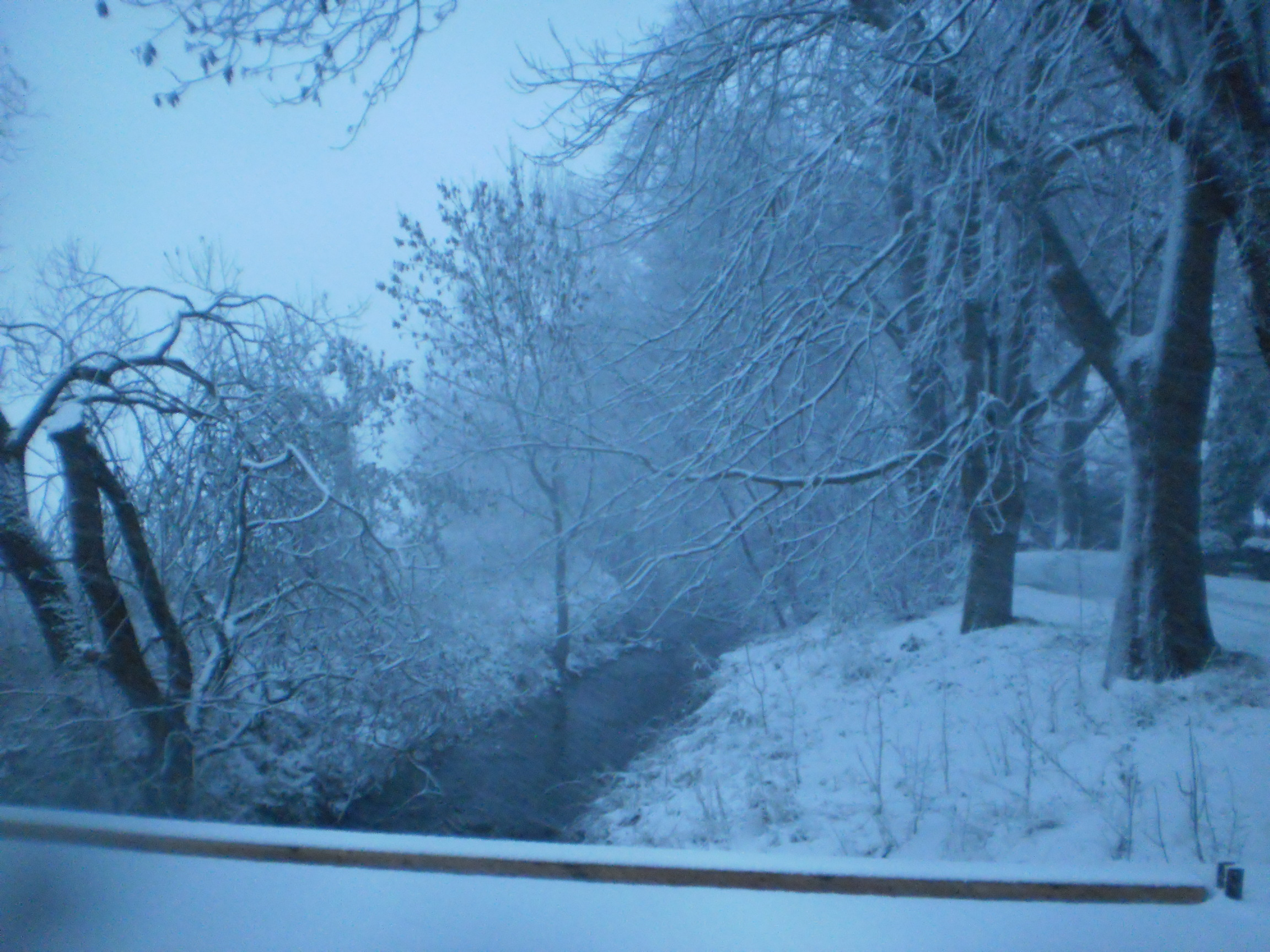

Location
- Country: Germany
- Location: Hesse

Physical characteristics
- Mouth
  - location: Lahn
  - coordinates: 50.6981°N 8.7169°E
- Length: 20.1 km (12.5 mi)

Basin features
- Progression: Lahn→ Rhine→ North Sea

Zwester Ohm is a river of Hesse, Germany. It flows into the Lahn near Fronhausen.

== See also ==
- List of rivers of Hesse
