= Wenkbach =

Village in Hesse, Germany

Coordinates: 50°44′42″N 8°42′57″E

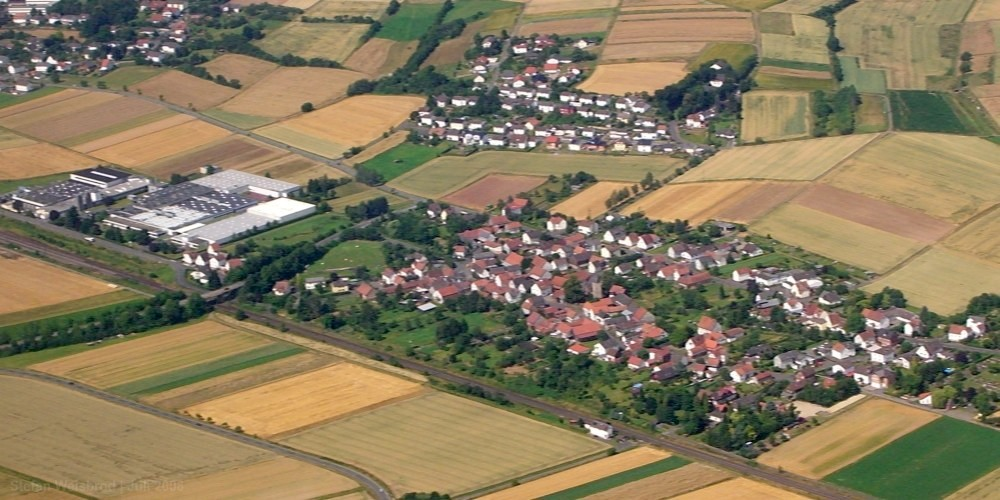
Aerial photography of Wenkbach

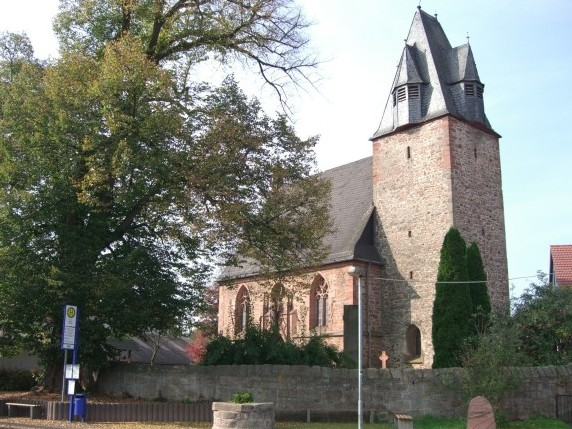
Church in Wenkbach

Wenkbach is a village in Hesse, Germany and part of the municipality of Weimar (Lahn). It is situated 10 km south of Marburg and 20 km north of Gießen. Wenkbach has about 680 inhabitants.

Among other buildings in the village worth seeing are the old church in Wenkbach. It is also worth a visit, as are the half-timbered houses to be found in the old centre of the village.
