= Fronhausen =

- Municipality
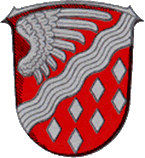
- Coat of arms

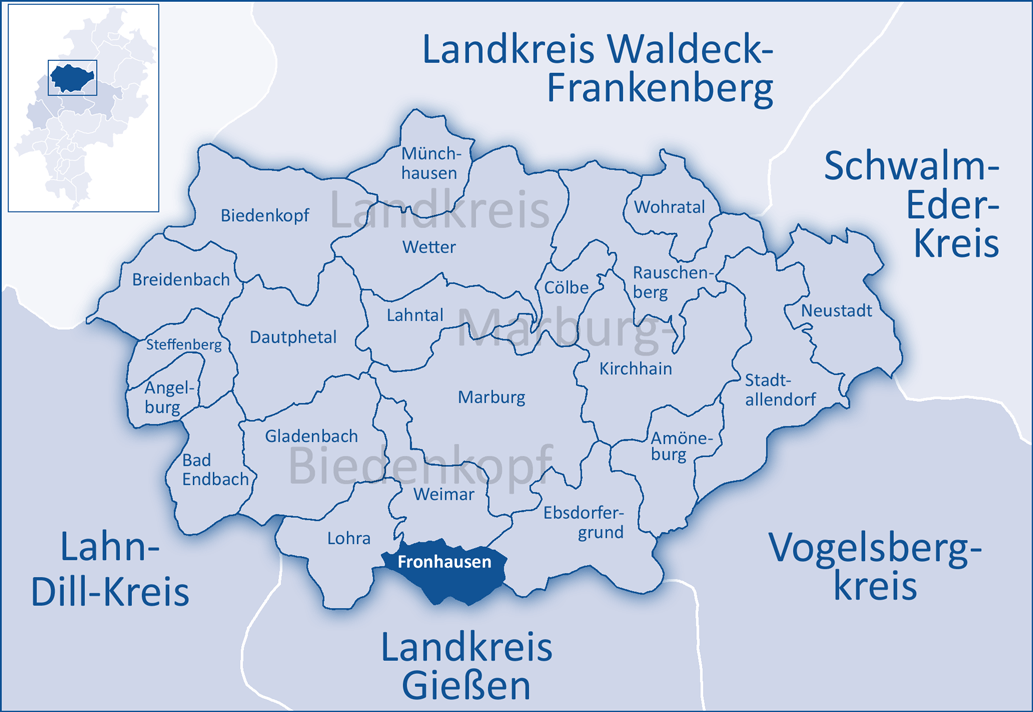
- Location of Fronhausen within Marburg-Biedenkopf district
- Interactive map of Fronhausen
- Location within Germany Location within Hesse
- Coordinates: 50°42′N 08°43′E
- Country: Germany
- State: Hesse
- Admin. region: Gießen
- District: Marburg-Biedenkopf

Government
  - Mayor (2021–27): Claudia Schnabel

Area
  - Total: 27.87 km^{2} (10.76 sq mi)
- Elevation: 168 m (551 ft)

Population (2025-12-31)
  - Total: 4,084
  - Density: 146.5/km^{2} (379.5/sq mi)
- Time zone: UTC+01:00 (CET)
  - Summer (DST): UTC+02:00 (CEST)
- Postal codes: 35112
- Dialling codes: 06426
- Vehicle registration: MR
- Website: www.fronhausen.de

Fronhausen (German pronunciation: [fʁoːnˈhaʊzn̩]) is a municipality in the south of Marburg-Biedenkopf district in the administrative region of Gießen in Hessen, Germany.

The municipal area stretches along the district's southern boundary in the Lahn valley and its environs between Marburg and Gießen, and borders in the north on the municipality of Weimar, in the east on the municipality of Ebsdorfergrund, in the south on the towns of Staufenberg and Lollar, and in the west on the municipality of Lohra.

It was formed out of seven former municipalities in the early 1970s as part of Hessen's municipal reforms at that time. The former municipalities were:

- Bellnhausen
- Erbenhausen
- Fronhausen
- Hassenhausen
- Holzhausen
- Oberwalgern
- Sichertshausen

== Politics ==
=== Municipal council ===
Since the last municipal elections held in March 2006, the seats on the municipal council have been distributed thus:

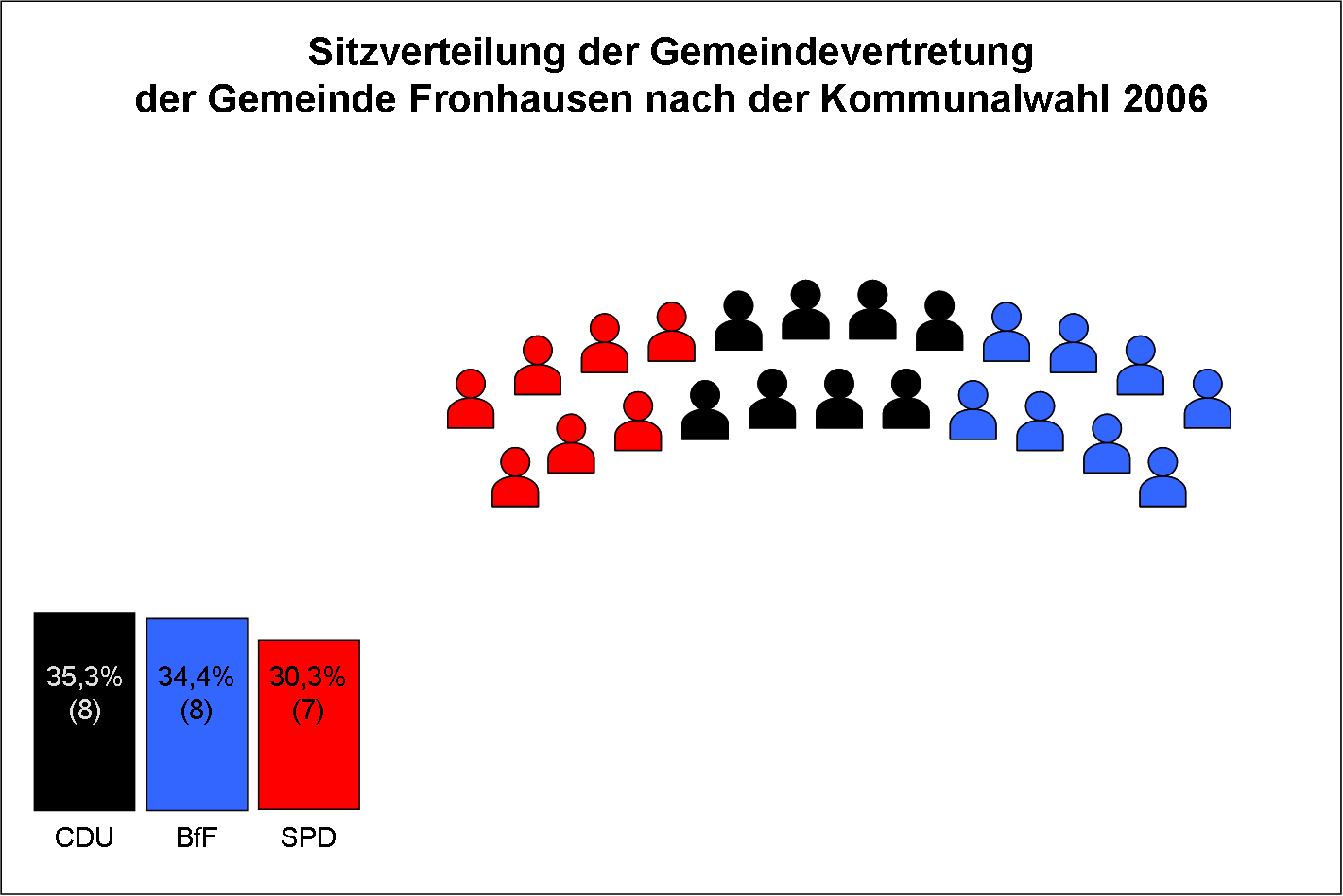
Apportionment of seats on Fronhausen Municipal Council after municipal elections in 2006

Parties and voter coalitions		Share in %	Seats
CDU	Christian Democratic Union (Germany)	35.3	8
SPD	Social Democratic Party of Germany	30.3	7
BfF	Bürger für Fronhausen	34.4	8
total		100	23

=== Coat of arms ===
The civic coat of arms might be described thus: In gules a bend sinister wavy argent; above, a wing argent; below, seven lozenges argent.

The arms were chosen from many proposals put forth after the greater municipality was formed. The bend sinister (the band) stands for the river Lahn, which flows through the municipality. The wing comes from the historic Fronhausen reeves' arms, and the lozenges from the Stewards (Schenken) of Schweinsberg, who were formerly the local nobility; the number of lozenges – seven – also represents the number of constituent municipalities.

== Transport links ==
In the municipality are a connection with the four-lane Federal Highway (Bundesstraße) B 3, and a stop on the Main-Weser railway, with regional and regional express service.

== Partnerships ==
- Sonchamp, France
- Clairefontaine-en-Yvelines, France
- La Celle-les-Bordes, France

All these partner municipalities are near Rambouillet.

== Sons and daughters of the municipality ==
- Heinrich Bastian (1875–1967), Regional poet from Fronhausen
