= Rabenau, Hesse =

Rabenau
- Municipality
- Coat of arms

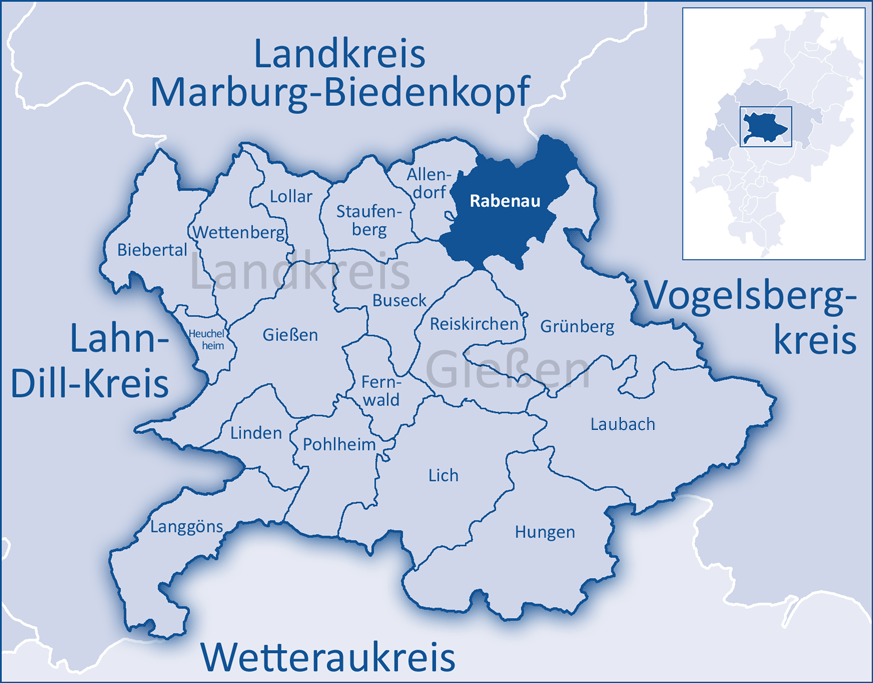
- Location of Rabenau within Gießen district
- Interactive map of Rabenau
- Location within Germany Location within Hesse
- Coordinates: 50°40′34″N 08°51′41″E
- Country: Germany
- State: Hesse
- Admin. region: Gießen
- District: Gießen

Government
  - Mayor (2023–29): Björn Zimmer

Area
  - Total: 43.4 km^{2} (16.8 sq mi)
- Elevation: 200–377 m (656–1,237 ft)

Population (2025-12-31)
  - Total: 4,888
  - Density: 113/km^{2} (292/sq mi)
- Time zone: UTC+01:00 (CET)
  - Summer (DST): UTC+02:00 (CEST)
- Postal codes: 35466
- Dialling codes: 06407
- Vehicle registration: GI
- Website: www.gemeinde-rabenau.de

Rabenau (German pronunciation: [ˈʁaːbənaʊ]) is a municipality in the district of Gießen, in Hesse, Germany.
