= Staufenberg, Hesse =

Staufenberg
- Town
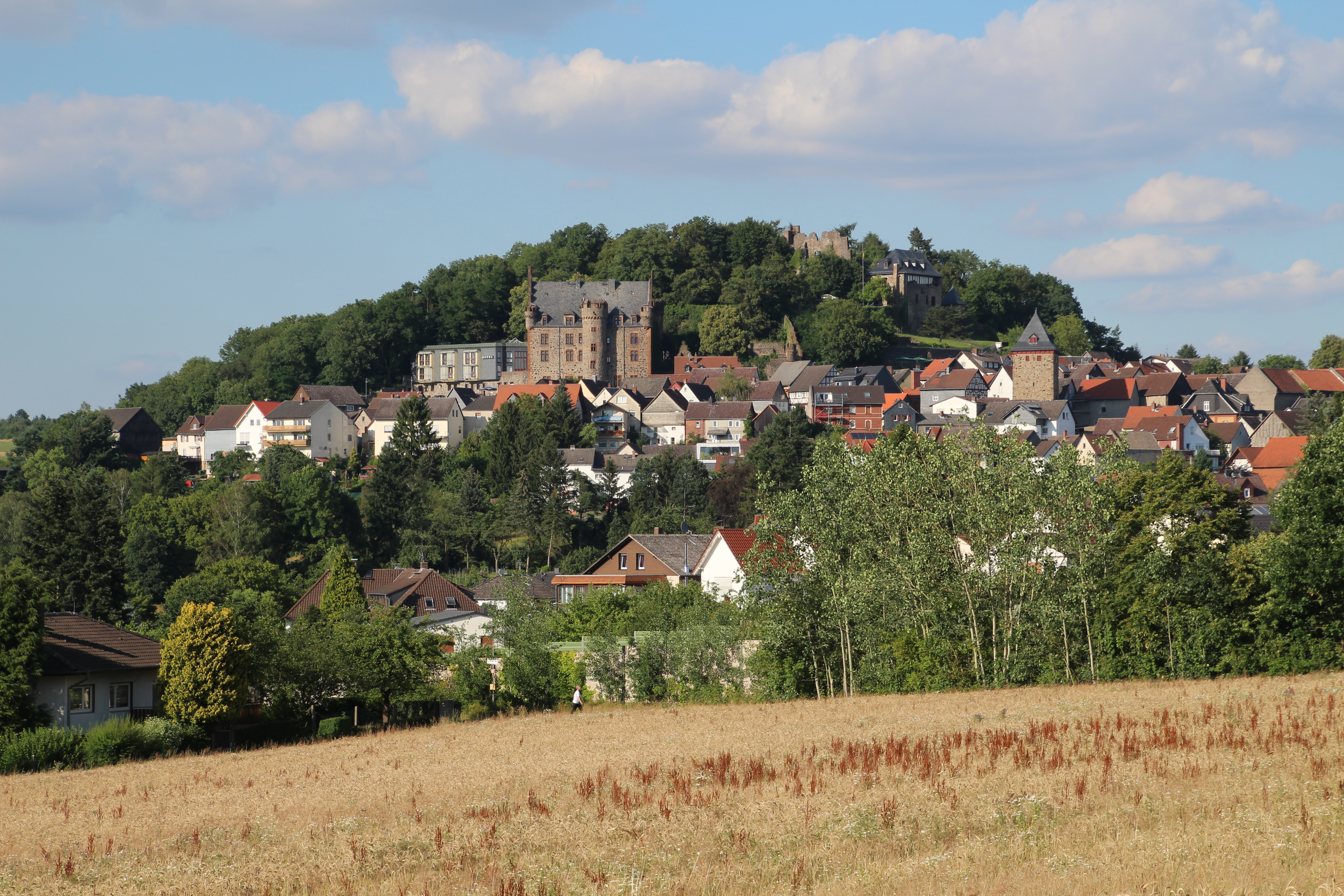

- Coat of arms

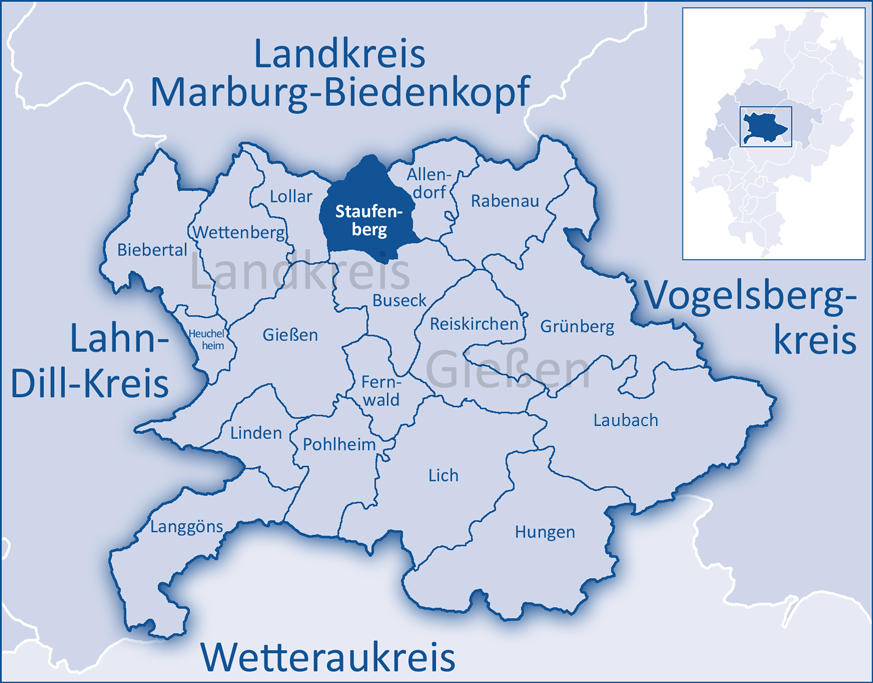
- Location of Staufenberg within Gießen district
- Interactive map of Staufenberg
- Location within Germany Location within Hesse
- Coordinates: 50°40′N 8°43′E
- Country: Germany
- State: Hesse
- Admin. region: Gießen
- District: Gießen

Government
  - Mayor (2023–29): Peter Gefeller (SPD)

Area
  - Total: 28.58 km^{2} (11.03 sq mi)
- Elevation: 190 m (620 ft)

Population (2025-12-31)
  - Total: 8,219
  - Density: 287.6/km^{2} (744.8/sq mi)
- Time zone: UTC+01:00 (CET)
  - Summer (DST): UTC+02:00 (CEST)
- Postal codes: 35460
- Dialling codes: 06406
- Vehicle registration: GI
- Website: www.staufenberg.de

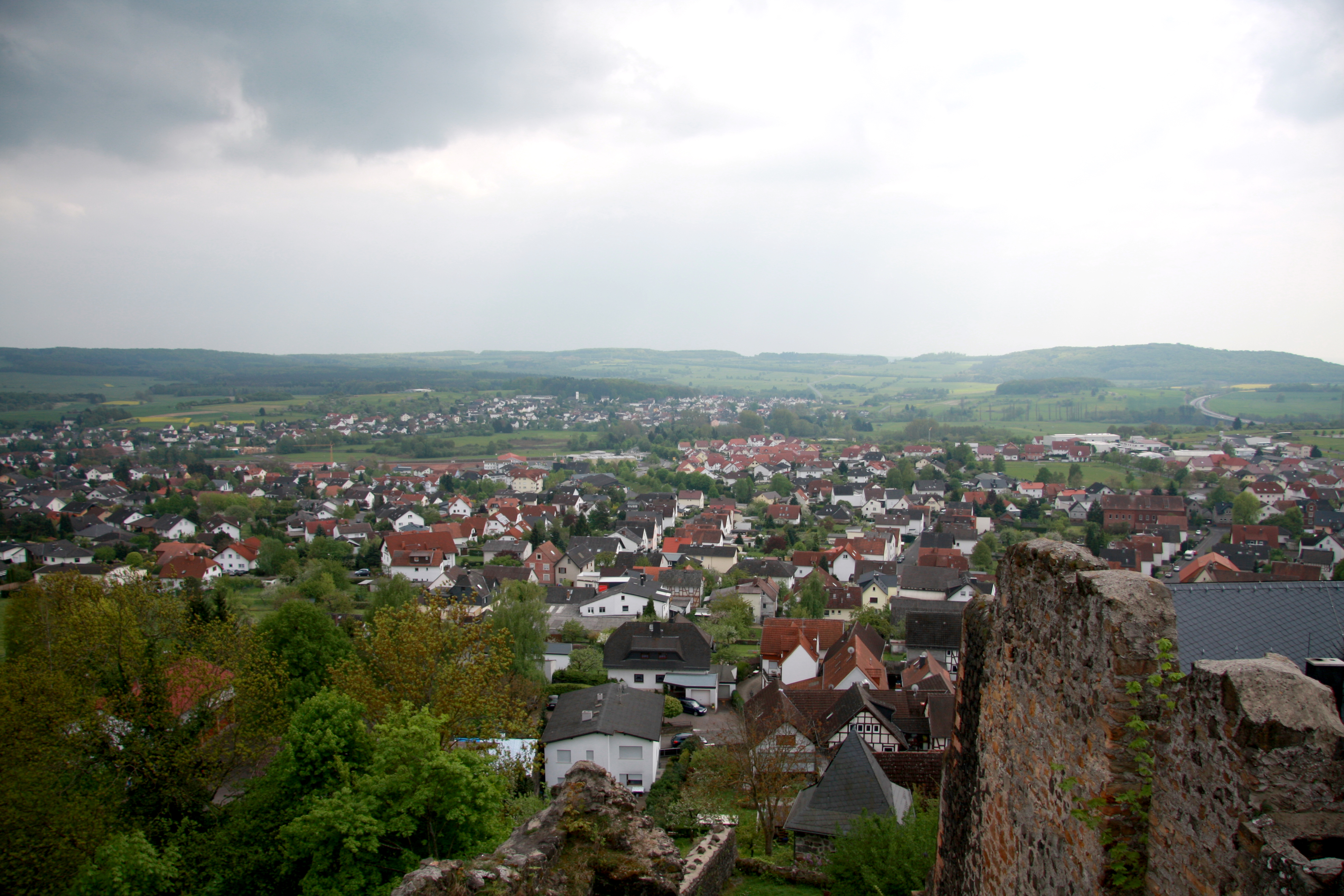
Staufenberg seen from the ruins of Staufenberg Castle

Staufenberg (German pronunciation: [ˈʃtaʊfn̩bɛʁk]) is a town in the district of Gießen, in Hesse, Germany. It is situated on the river Lumda, 10 km north of Gießen.
