= Death and funeral of Helmut Kohl =

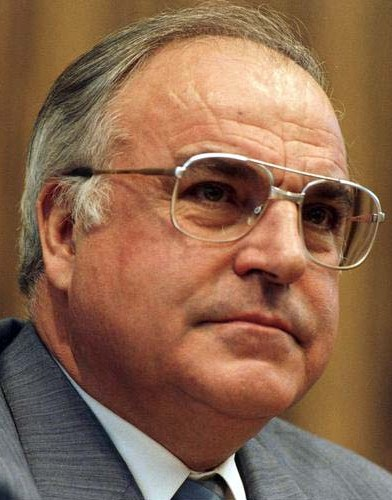
Helmut Kohl, the former Chancellor of Germany, died on 16 June 2017 at the age of 87

Helmut Kohl, the former Chancellor of Germany, died on the morning of Friday, 16 June 2017 in the Oggersheim district of Ludwigshafen, his home town, aged 87. In office from 1982 to 1998, he is widely regarded as the "father of the German reunification" and as a principal architect of the Maastricht Treaty which established the European Union (EU) and the euro currency. In 1998 he became the second person to be named an Honorary Citizen of Europe. Following his death, he was lauded by world leaders as "the greatest European leader of the second half of the 20th century" and was honoured with an unprecedented European Act of State in his honour in Strasbourg, France, attended by the leaders of the EU's nations and other current and former world leaders. Subsequently, a Catholic requiem mass was celebrated in the Speyer Cathedral in Speyer, Germany, after which Kohl was interred in the nearby Old Cemetery.

Helmut Kohl was survived by his two sons Walter Kohl and Peter Kohl, and by his grandchildren Johannes and Leyla Kohl. No member of the Kohl family, Kohl's children and grandchildren, participated in any of the ceremonies, owing to a feud with Kohl's controversial second wife Maike Kohl-Richter, who had among other things barred them from paying their respects to him at his house and ignored their wishes for a ceremony in Berlin and that Kohl be interred alongside his parents and his wife of four decades, Hannelore Kohl, in the family tomb.

== Reactions ==
Domestic

Germany – Chancellor Angela Merkel, speaking from the German Embassy in Rome, said that "This man who was great in every sense of the word—his achievement, his role as a statesman in Germany at its historical moment—it's going to take a while until we can truly assess what we have lost in his passing." She lauded Kohl's "supreme art of statesmanship in the service of people and peace" and noted that Kohl had also changed her own life decisively.

International

Belgium – Prime Minister Charles Michel called Kohl "a true European" who "will be greatly missed."

France – French president Emmanuel Macron called Kohl a "great European" and "an architect of united Germany and Franco-German friendship."

Holy See – Pope Francis lauded Kohl as "a great statesman and committed European [who] worked with farsightedness and devotion for the good of the people in Germany and in neighbouring European countries."

Hungary – Hungarian prime minister Viktor Orbán called Kohl the "great old man" of European politics and "Hungary’s friend".

Italy – Italian president Sergio Mattarella called Kohl one of Europe's founding fathers, and said that "he who was, rightly, described as 'the Chancellor of Reunification', worked with far-sightedness and determination, in years marked by deep and epochal changes in world equilibria, to give back unity to his country in the framework of the great project of European integration. As an authentic statesman, he knew how to combine pragmatism and a capacity of vision, furnishing a courageous contribution not only to the fall of the Berlin Wall and the reunification of Germany, but also to overcoming the dramatic divisions which, for decades, had torn Europe." Former Italian prime minister and President of the European Commission Romano Prodi called Kohl "a giant of a united Europe."

Israel – Israeli prime minister Benjamin Netanyahu sent his condolences to the German people and the family, and praised Kohl calling him one of "Israel's greatest friends, he was completely dedicated to its security."

Netherlands – Dutch Prime Minister Mark Rutte said Kohl was "a great statesman" who had shaped European history.

Poland – Polish prime minister Beata Szydło called Kohl "an outstanding figure and statesman, a great politician in exceptional times".

Russia – Former Soviet head of state Mikhail Gorbachev said that "it was real luck that at that difficult time [1989–1990] leading nations were headed by statesmen with a sense of responsibility, adamant about defending the interests of their countries but also able to consider the interests of others, able to overcome the barrier of prevailing suspicion about partnership and mutual trust. The name of this outstanding German politician will stay in the memory of his compatriots and all Europeans." Russian president Vladimir Putin said "I was lucky to know Helmut Kohl in person. I profoundly admired his wisdom and the ability to make well-considered, far-reaching decisions even in the most difficult situations." He called Kohl a "highly reputed statesman, one of the patriarchs of European and world politics."

Spain – Spanish prime minister Mariano Rajoy lauded Kohl's role in European history and in the German reunification.

Tibet – The 14th Dalai Lama praised Kohl as "a visionary leader and statesman" and said he had "great admiration for Chancellor Kohl's steady leadership when the Cold War came to a peaceful end and the re-unification of Germany became possible."

United States – Former U.S. president George H. W. Bush lauded Kohl as "a true friend of freedom" and "one of the greatest leaders in post-War Europe." Former U.S. president Bill Clinton said he was "deeply saddened" by the death of "my dear friend" whose "visionary leadership prepared Germany and all of Europe for the 21st century." U.S. president Donald Trump said Kohl was "a friend and ally to the United States" and that "he was not only the father of German reunification, but also an advocate for Europe and the transatlantic relationship. The world has benefited from his vision and efforts. His legacy will live on." Former U.S. secretary of state James Baker said Kohl's death means "Germany has lost one of its greatest leaders, the United States has lost one of its best friends and the world has lost a ringing voice for freedom," and that Kohl "more than anyone at the end of the Cold War [...] was the architect of the reunification of Germany" which had "brought freedom to millions and has helped make Europe safer and more prosperous."

United Kingdom – Former British prime minister John Major said Kohl was "a towering figure in German and European history" who "entrenched Germany in a wider Europe, in the hope of achieving a unity and peace that the continent had never known before. This required great political strength and courage – both of which qualities Helmut had in abundance." British prime minister Theresa May called Kohl "a giant of European history" and said that "I pay tribute to the role he played in helping to end the Cold War and reunify Germany. We have lost the father of modern Germany."

Organizations

European Union – Flags were flown at half-staff at the Berlaymont building, the European Commission's headquarters in Brussels. Commission President Jean-Claude Juncker lauded Kohl as "a great European." He called Kohl "my mentor, my friend, the very essence of Europe." The president of the European Council, Donald Tusk, called Kohl "a friend and a statesman, who helped to reunify Europe." The president of the European Parliament Antonio Tajani lauded Kohl as a statesman with a "great European vision" and "who was the champion of reconciliation and unity among the peoples of Europe."

NATO – NATO secretary-general Jens Stoltenberg said Kohl was "a true European" and the "embodiment of a united Germany in a united Europe."

United Nations – UN Secretary-General António Guterres said Kohl had "played an instrumental role in the peaceful reunification of his country" and that "today's Europe is a product of his vision and his tenacity, in the face of enormous obstacles."

== European act of state ==
External videos
- Memorial service for Kohl at the European Parliament, July 1, 2017, C-SPAN

Kohl was honoured with an unprecedented European act of state in his honour in Strasbourg, attended by the leaders of the EU's nations and other current and former world leaders. Planned as a "grand ceremony" co-organised by the European Commission, the European Parliament and the European Council, it took place at the European Parliament on 1 July 2017. Speakers included Chancellor of Germany Angela Merkel, President of France Emmanuel Macron, President of the European Commission Jean-Claude Juncker, President of the European Parliament Antonio Tajani, President of the European Council Donald Tusk and former president of the United States Bill Clinton.

== Requiem mass ==
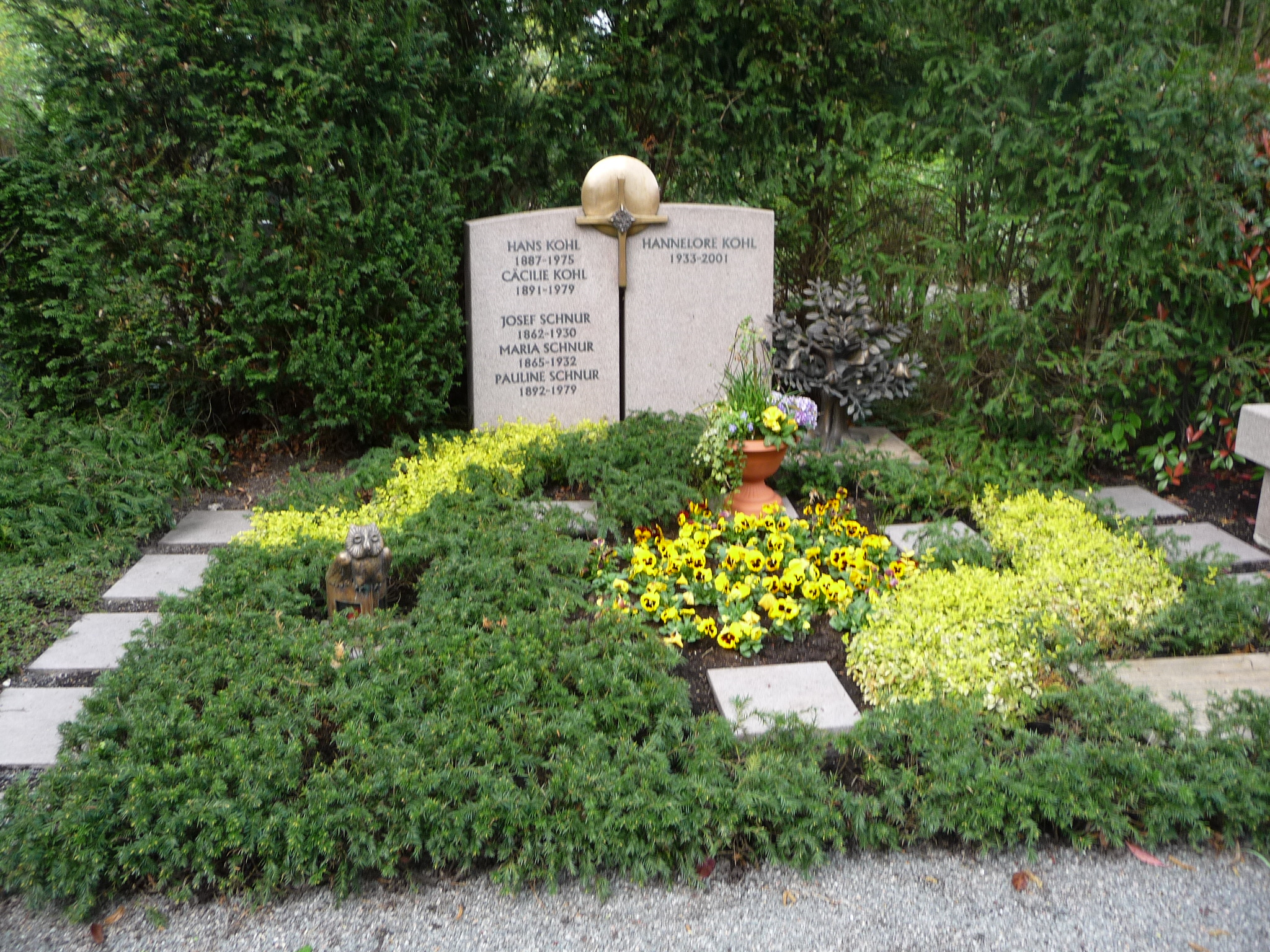
The Kohl family tomb where Hannelore Kohl and both of Helmut Kohl's parents are interred

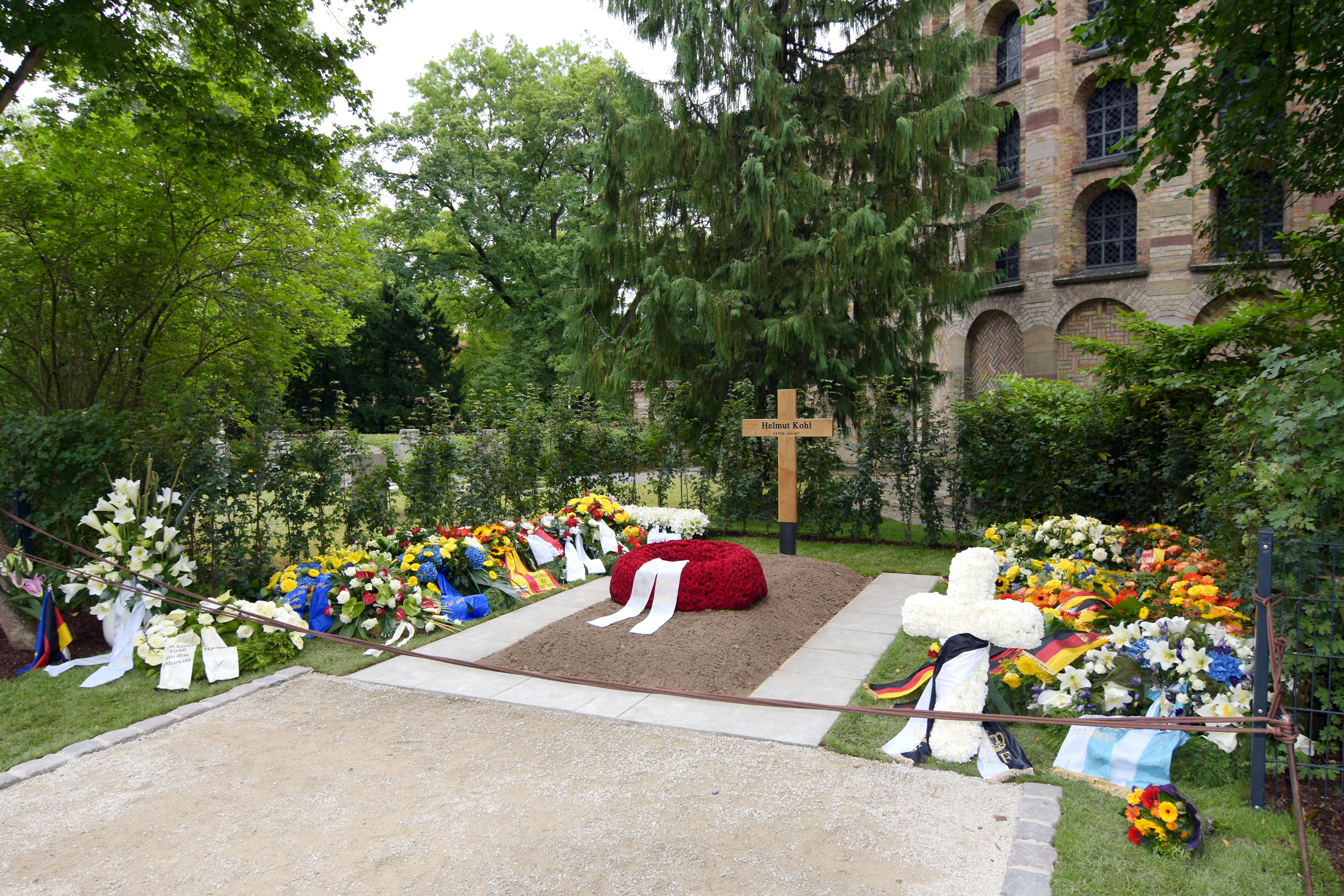
Helmut Kohl's resting place

A Catholic requiem mass was celebrated in the Speyer Cathedral in Speyer, Germany. It was broadcast on television.

== Funeral ==
The Kohl family—Kohl's children and grandchildren—favoured a burial in the family tomb in Ludwigshafen where both of Kohl's parents, his grandparents and his wife of 41 years Hannelore Kohl are interred.

Kohl's controversial second wife Maike Kohl-Richter however insisted on a burial in a separate tomb in Speyer. After the Church had turned down her request to bury Kohl inside the Speyer Cathedral alongside several Holy Roman Emperors, she decided on a burial in the nearby Old Cemetery.

== Controversy ==
Controversy was caused when Helmut Kohl's controversial new wife Maike Kohl-Richter (formerly Richter) prevented Kohl's children and grandchildren from paying their respects to their deceased father and grandfather. In a statement to the media, Kohl's son Walter Kohl accused her of "tasteless behaviour." Maike Richter was also criticized for attempting to take full control of the memorial ceremony in Strasbourg, and for denying Helmut Kohl a German act of state in Berlin, as desired by most German politicians, out of spite for Chancellor Angela Merkel. Richter, who is known for hard-right anti-immigrant views and for her support for Hungary's controversial Prime Minister Viktor Orbán, also attempted to bar Chancellor Merkel from speaking at the European memorial ceremony and wanted to have Orbán speaking instead. She only relented when told by confidantes that it would cause a scandal and be considered extremely inappropriate.

The Kohl family has declined to participate in the funeral in Speyer because they object to their father and grandfather not being interred next to his wife of 41 years, Hannelore Kohl. In his biography of his mother, Kohl's son Peter Kohl wrote that Maike Richter seemed to have an unhealthy obsession with his father and compared her to a stalker who had ensnared his father. The Kohl family, unlike Maike Richter, also supports a state ceremony in Berlin.
