= European act of state in honour of Helmut Kohl =

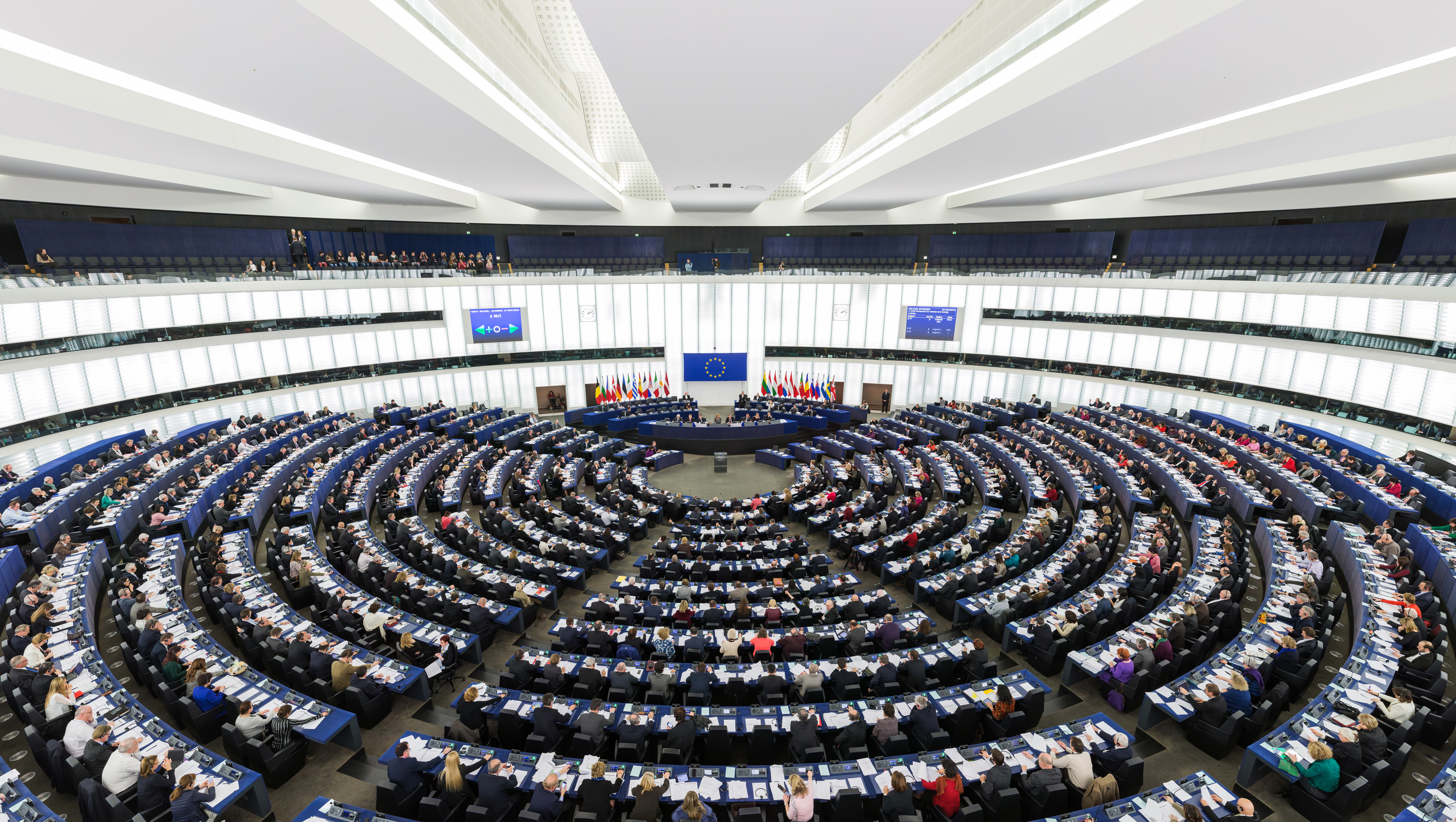
- Hemicycle of the European Parliament in Strasbourg (photo taken during a parliamentary session)
- Date: 1 July 2017
- Venue: European Parliament
- Location: Strasbourg, France
- Organised by: European Union

The European act of state in honour of Helmut Kohl was an act of state to honour former German Chancellor Helmut Kohl following his death, and took place at the European Parliament in Strasbourg, France on 1 July 2017 from 11 AM to 1 PM. It was announced by the European Commission on 18 June 2017, and was the first European act of state in the history of the European Union. It was co-organised by the European Commission, the European Parliament and the European Council.

Helmut Kohl died on 16 June 2017 and was survived by his sons Walter Kohl and Peter Kohl, and grandchildren Johannes Volkmann and Leyla Kohl. The European Commission announced that it was planning a grand ceremony, attended by European heads of state and government, to honour Kohl. Kohl was one of only three people to be awarded the title Honorary Citizen of Europe by the European Union, and was, together with French President François Mitterrand, one of the two principal architects of the Maastricht Treaty which established the European Union and the euro currency. He was also considered the "father of the German reunification."

== Speakers ==
External videos
- Memorial service for Kohl at the European Parliament, July 1, 2017, C-SPAN

The speakers at the ceremony were, in the following order

1. Antonio Tajani, President of the European Parliament and former European Commissioner for Industry and Entrepreneurship
2. Jean-Claude Juncker, President of the European Commission and former Prime Minister of Luxembourg
3. Donald Tusk, President of the European Council and former Prime Minister of Poland
4. Felipe González, former Prime Minister of Spain
5. Bill Clinton, former President of the United States and a contemporary friend of Kohl
6. Dmitry Medvedev, Prime Minister and former President of Russia
7. Emmanuel Macron, President of France
8. Angela Merkel, Chancellor of Germany

== Other guests ==
=== Incumbent heads of state and government ===
- Frank-Walter Steinmeier, President of Germany
- Dalia Grybauskaitė, President of Lithuania
- Petro Poroshenko, President of Ukraine
- Andrzej Duda, President of Poland
- Alexander Van der Bellen, President of Austria
- Benjamin Netanyahu, Prime Minister of Israel
- Viktor Orbán, Prime Minister of Hungary
- Mark Rutte, Prime Minister of the Netherlands
- Stefan Löfven, Prime Minister of Sweden
- Charles Michel, Prime Minister of Belgium
- Juha Sipilä, Prime Minister of Finland
- Theresa May, Prime Minister of the United Kingdom

=== Former heads of state and government ===
- Joachim Gauck, former President of Germany
- Christian Wulff, former President of Germany
- Horst Köhler, former President of Germany
- Gerhard Schröder, former Chancellor of Germany
- King Juan Carlos and Queen Sofía of Spain
- Felipe González, former Prime Minister of Spain
- Jose Maria Aznar, former Prime Minister of Spain
- Paavo Lipponen, former Prime Minister of Finland
- John Major, former Prime Minister of the United Kingdom
- Nicolas Sarkozy, former President of France
- Romano Prodi, former Prime Minister of Italy and President of the European Commission
- Silvio Berlusconi, former Prime Minister of Italy
- Mario Monti, former Prime Minister of Italy and European Commissioner for Competition
- Guy Verhofstadt, former Prime Minister of Belgium
- Jerzy Buzek, former Prime Minister of Poland and President of the European Parliament
- Franz Vranitzky, former Chancellor of Austria
- Herman Van Rompuy, former Prime Minister of Belgium and President of the European Council
- Wolfgang Schüssel, former Chancellor of Austria
- Jacques Santer, former Prime Minister of Luxembourg and President of the European Commission
- Rudolf Schuster, former President of Slovakia
- José Manuel Barroso, former Prime Minister of Portugal and President of the European Commission
- Aníbal Cavaco Silva, former President of Portugal
- Jean Chrétien, former Prime Minister of Canada
- B. J. Habibie, former President of Indonesia

=== European Union leaders ===
- Martin Schulz, former President of the European Parliament
- Hans-Gert Pöttering, former President of the European Parliament
- Josep Borrell, former President of the European Parliament
- Pat Cox, former President of the European Parliament
- Frans Timmermans, First Vice President of the European Commission
- Federica Mogherini, High Representative of the Union for Foreign Affairs and Security Policy
- Günther Oettinger, European Commissioner for Budget and Human Resources
- Maroš Šefčovič, European Commissioner for Energy Union

== Controversy ==
No member of the Kohl family, Kohl's children and grandchildren, attended the ceremony, owing to a feud with Kohl's controversial second wife Maike Kohl-Richter, who had among other things barred them from paying their respects to their father and grandfather after his death, ignored their wish for a ceremony in Berlin and their wish that Kohl should be interred alongside his parents and his wife of four decades Hannelore Kohl in the family tomb. Richter had also attempted to bar Chancellor Merkel from speaking and wanted to have Viktor Orbán, who has fiercely criticized Merkel's refugee policy, speak instead.
