= Maike Kohl-Richter =

German economist and author

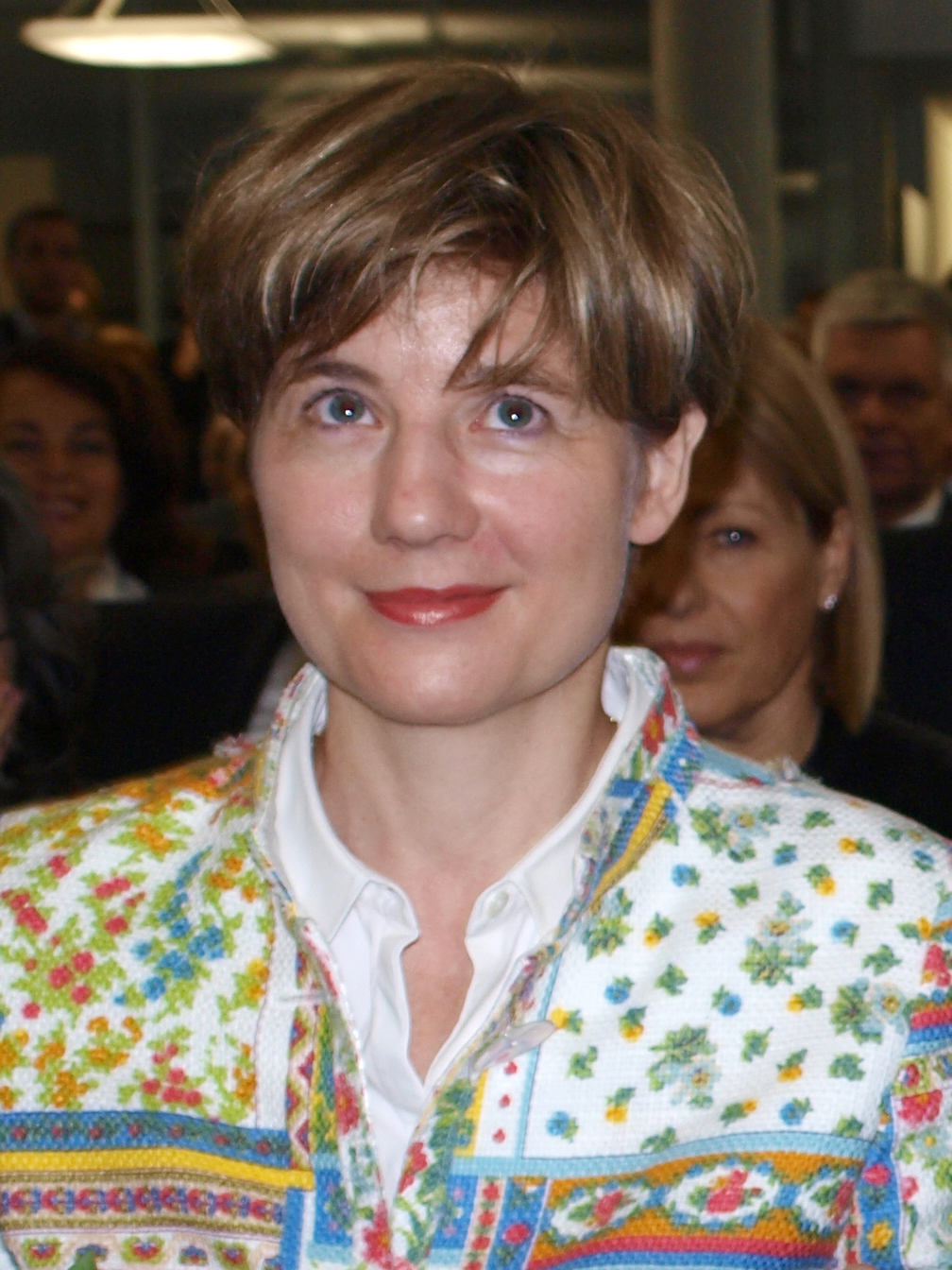
Maike Richter, 2009

Maike Kohl-Richter (née Richter; born April 1964) is best known as the second wife of the former German Chancellor Helmut Kohl from 2008 until his death in 2017. She is controversial in Germany for her right-wing anti-immigrant views and support for Viktor Orbán, and for her public feud with Kohl's children and grandchildren. She has been accused of hijacking the Kohl legacy and "has been criticized by Kohl's own children for allegedly hero-worshipping the former chancellor and being obsessed" with him. She was criticized by German media, public figures and the Kohl family after Kohl's death.

== Early life and education ==
Richter was born in April 1964 in a village near Freudenberg in Siegerland, to Evelyn and Wolfgang Richter. She grew up the third of four children in Oberheuslingen. Her father was an engineer working for RWE in Siegen. Her mother was a local reporter at the local newspaper, the Siegener Zeitung. She described her daughter in a biographical novel as "a child face like out of a children's book, joyous, unrestrained and totally without problems".

Richter attended a Protestant high school (Gymnasium) and joined the CDU's youth wing, the Junge Union, while still at school. She was noticed by Dirk Metz, district chairman, who said, "She was a perky one, with short cut hair - a stunner." She became a committee member of the district executive Siegen-Wittgenstein.

She attended LMU Munich and earned a doctorate in economics in 1996. Friends remember that she wanted to become at least state secretary (mindestens Staatssekretärin). Her elder sister and a brother became physicians.

== Professional life ==
From 1994 to 1998, Richter worked as a junior speechwriter at the German Chancellery when Helmut Kohl was in power. She left after he lost the election and briefly worked as an adviser to Friedrich Merz, member of the Bundestag for the CDU. Thereafter she was a business journalist for Wirtschaftswoche for one year.

She joined the Federal Ministry for Economic Affairs and Energy in Bonn as economy ministry aide heading the department for regional economic policy, urban development and regional planning. In 2004, she vacationed at a beach resort in Sri Lanka, and survived the massive 2004 tsunami. She left her job only in 2008 after she had married Helmut Kohl.

== Marriage to Helmut Kohl ==
Per Richter, Helmut Kohl had started introducing her as his "new life-partner" in 2005. They married on 8 May 2008, seven years after the suicide of Kohl's widely respected first wife Hannelore Kohl. At the time Richter was 44 years old and Helmut Kohl, then aged 78, was hospitalized in "critical condition" with serious head trauma, and was barely able to speak. For the duration of their marriage, Helmut Kohl was impaired by brain damage, had difficulty speaking and was unable to walk.

=== Perspective of Kohl family ===
According to Helmut Kohl's son Peter Kohl, Helmut Kohl did not intend to marry Richter and had stated this clearly; "then came the accident and a loss of control," Peter Kohl said, suggesting that Richter had pressured his then seriously ill father into marrying her.

Peter Kohl said Richter had seemed nervous and hectic the first time they met, and that she had declared, seemingly in full earnest, that her brother "also is a Kohlian". He had asked her if she said "Korean" and she had loudly proclaimed, "No, no, no, K-O-H-L-I-A-N," and looked at him in a completely disenchanted way.

In 2011, Peter Kohl managed to visit his father together with his daughter, Leyla Kohl, for the last time. His father had been happy to see them, but after a while he let them know that it would be better if they left before Richter found out, otherwise there would be "great troubles". Peter Kohl speculated that his father was not "able or allowed" to take part in the 10th anniversary commemoration event for Hannelore's death.

Peter Kohl wrote in the biography of his late mother Hannelore Kohl about the only time he had visited Richter's apartment. "In my male naïveté, I was not prepared for what awaited me there: I had entered a kind of private Helmut Kohl museum," which he described as full of Helmut Kohl photographs and artefacts wherever he looked. "The whole thing looked like the result of staggering, meticulous collecting for the purpose of hero worship, as we know it from reports on stalkers," an unhealthy obsession with his father.

Kohl became estranged from his two sons and his grandchildren. In 2013, his sons said his new wife kept their father "like a prisoner" and that she prevented them from seeing him for the prior six years.

Kohl's sons later explained that it was unclear whether letters purportedly from their father were actually written by him or Richter, they were not allowed to speak with their father on the telephone and that they were threatened by Richter with police and imprisonment if they tried to visit their parents' house, their own childhood home. They noted that Richter had appropriated their late mother's jewellery, their family heirlooms, and ordered their mother's pictures to be removed from the Kohl family home; "it seemed to be the case that she tried to erase all traces or memories of Hannelore Kohl, her children and grandchildren," Peter Kohl wrote.

In 2012, Jochen Arntz criticized Kohl-Richter in the Süddeutsche Zeitung for building a "wall" around Helmut Kohl and controlling him; as a result Kohl had also become estranged from many former friends whom she disliked.

In 2014, Heribert Schwan, Helmut Kohl's biographer, described Richter as "more than conservative, rather German Nationalist" (deutschnational), and said she insists on the right to "interpretational sovereignty" in relation to Kohl's life and that she had insisted on many proven falsehoods.

== After Kohl's death ==
As a result of Kohl-Richter's behaviour, the entire Kohl family — his children and grandchildren — boycotted Helmut Kohl's funeral and all the related ceremonies. Die Welt commented that Kohl-Richter never was recognised as a proper member of the Kohl family, neither by the Kohl family itself nor by German society.

Richter has been widely compared to the unpopular third wife of Willy Brandt, Brigitte Seebacher-Brandt, who caused a scandal by allegedly disinviting Brandt's wife during his entire political career and mother of his children Rut Brandt to his funeral, and for her later insistence on being an authority on Brandt's political legacy. However, Seebacher-Brandt has criticized Richter's behaviour following Kohl's death. Per Egon Bahr, Rut Brandt herself said in a telephone call between the two that she had no intention of attending Willy Brandt's funeral and Brandt's son Peter said his mother had told him she would not have wanted to attend the funeral due to the potential for public scandal but would nevertheless have liked to have been invited.

Richter has been criticized for falsely claiming to have "the sole decision-making power" over Kohl's historical legacy, a claim which has been widely mocked by German media and described as "a provocation". Le Monde noted that Richter was "accused of wanting to exert excessive control over the memory of her husband". Der Spiegel noted that "Maike Kohl-Richter wants to control the political legacy of Helmut Kohl. But she has largely isolated herself with her quarrelsome behaviour in relation to Kohl's funeral." Spiegel editor and Kohl expert Jan Fleischhauer has accused Richter of "stealing the Chancellor" from the people with her insistence on having "the sole decision-making power" over his legacy. The Swiss paper Der Bund wrote that she had been called "Kohl's ventriloquist" and "family destroyer" in public, and that she was "reviled and demonized" in Germany.

Kohl-Richter has been criticized by the Kohl family for keeping Helmut Kohl "like a prisoner" and preventing him from having contact with his family, and of taking full control of Kohl's correspondence and writing letters on his behalf with little or no involvement from him in the last years of his life. Maike Richter was accused.

=== Funeral visitation controversy ===
After Kohl's death, Richter denied Kohl's son Walter Kohl and grandchildren Johannes (son of Walter), aged 20, and Leyla Kohl (daughter of Peter Kohl and his Turkish wife Elif Sözen-Kohl), aged 15, entry to Helmut Kohl's house, the son's childhood home. Richter asked the police to tell Kohl's son and grandchildren to leave the Kohl family home when they waited outside to pay their respects to their father and grandfather. In a statement to the media, Walter Kohl accused her of "tasteless behaviour".

When Kohl's former driver, personal assistant over 46 years and close friend Eckhard Seeber wanted to sign the condolence book and Richter became aware of his presence she screamed, "Who let you in?" and ordered him to be evicted. The scene was repeated when Kohl's nephew, Harald Getrey, wanted to pay his respects to his uncle and was evicted by Richter. While Richter barred Kohl's children and grandchildren and other blood relatives from paying their respects to their father and grandfather in their own family home, she had let streams of her own friends see the body, and her friend, the former tabloid journalist Kai Diekmann, is a permanent presence "loitering" in the house, promoting Richter.

=== Controversy over Kohl's funeral ===
Richter was criticized for trying to take full control of Kohl's funeral. Richter declined a national memorial ceremony in Germany, trying to prevent Chancellor Angela Merkel from speaking at the ceremony in Strasbourg allegedly out of spite for Angela Merkel. Instead, Richter wanted the controversial Hungarian Prime Minister Viktor Orbán, who has fiercely criticized Merkel's refugee policy, to speak; she only relented when told it would cause a scandal.

Reuters noted that "many questioned whether it was really an increasingly frail Kohl who was close to Orbán, a nativist critic of Merkel's open-doors refugee policy" or whether it was actually Richter. Richter's attempt to control the European Union ceremony was criticized in a speech by the President of the Bundestag Norbert Lammert, where he said that "with all due respect, the way and the place in which this outstanding political lifetime achievement ... is honoured are more than a family affair." Deutsche Welle noted that "in this case, the word 'family' refers to one person", Maike Kohl-Richter.

Walter Kohl called the funeral plans unworthy of Kohl's legacy, and called for an act of state in Berlin as desired by most German politicians, and proposed it could take place in front of the Brandenburg Gate.

The entire Kohl family boycotted Helmut Kohl's funeral and all of the related ceremonies.
