= Honorary Citizen of Europe =

Honour bestowed by the European Council

Flag of the European Union

Honorary Citizen of Europe is an honour bestowed by the European Council of the European Union, for extraordinary work to promote European cooperation.

It has only been bestowed on three people:

- (France) Jean Monnet (2 April 1976)
- (Germany) Helmut Kohl (11 December 1998)
- (France) Jacques Delors (25 June 2015)

== Honourees ==
=== Jean Monnet ===
A French civil servant, businessman and diplomat formally recognized by the EU as one of eleven founding fathers, and the only founding father who held neither elected nor ministerial office in his lifetime, Monnet served as the first president of the High Authority of the European Coal and Steel Community, one of EU's principal precursor organization with two of its key institutions, the High Authority and the Common Assembly, respectively formed the basis of the European Commission and the European Parliament.

Monnet steered France's post war economic recovery as the first head of France's General Planning Commission (France) through the Monnet Plan, which in turn was the impetus for the Schuman Plan, a proposal initiated by Monnet and tabled by France's foreign minister Robert Schuman, the only other Frenchman among the eleven founding fathers, that created European Coal and Steel Community. The plan called for the integration of France's and Germany's the coal and steel industries, two industries essential to waging war at the time, and by extension economic integration and interdependence, with the ultimate objective to "make it plain that any war between France and Germany becomes not merely unthinkable, but materially impossible."

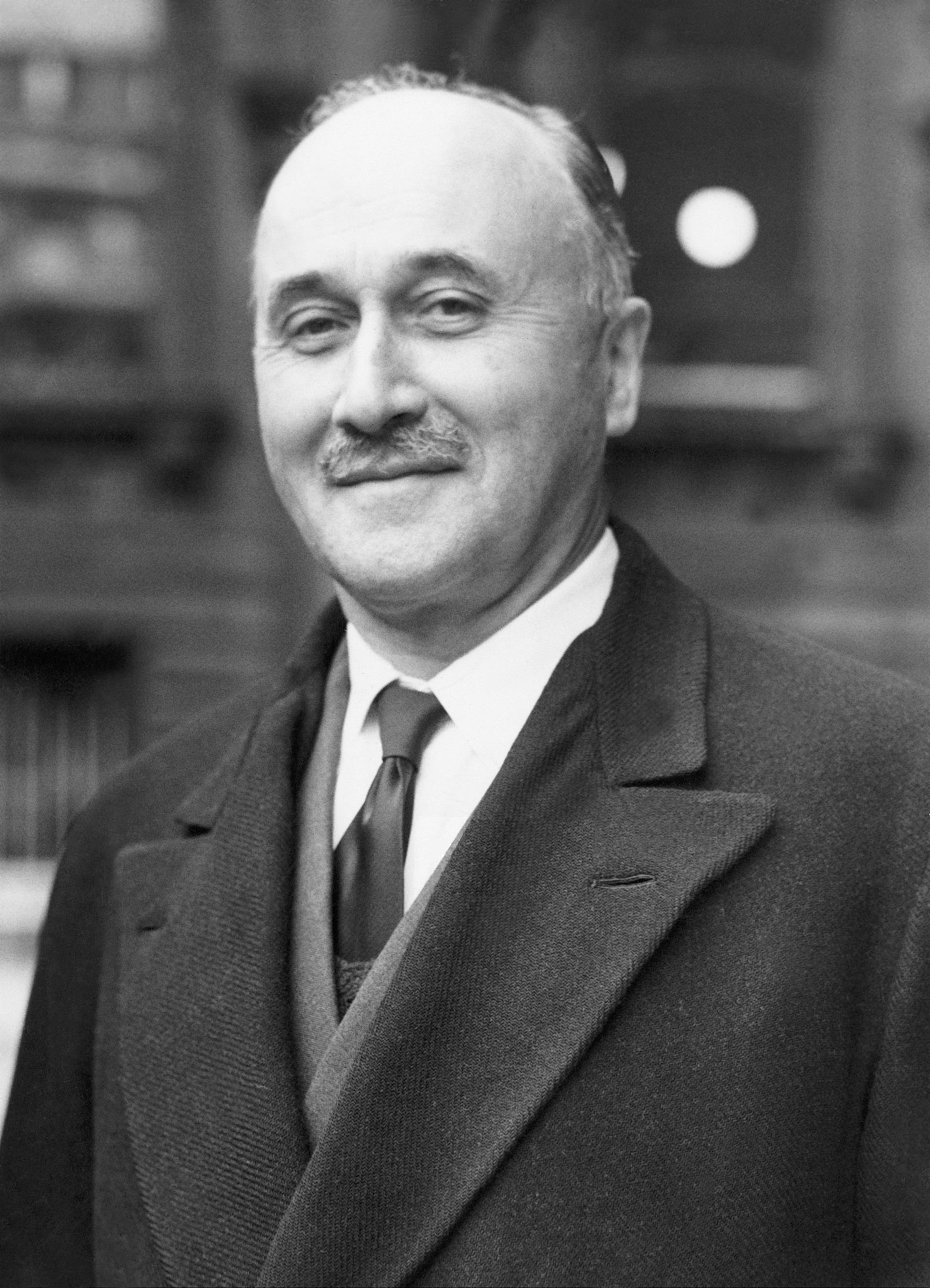

The European Council conferred the honorary citizen by resolution at its fourth meeting, held in Luxembourg in April 1976. The resolution explicitly references the role of economic ties as a foundation for political union.

The positive balance-sheet that can be drawn up at the end of this first stage, and on the eve of progress towards political unification, is something we owe in large measure to the boldness and breadth of vision of a handful of men. Among them, Jean Monnet has played a leading role, whether as inspirer of the Schuman Plan, first president of the High Authority, or founder of the Action Committee for the United States of Europe. In these various capacities, Jean Monnet has resolutely attacked the forces of inertia in Europe’s political and economic structure, with the aim of establishing a new type of relationship between States, making apparent their de facto solidarity and giving it institutional form.

As a realist, Monnet took economic interests as his starting-point, but without abandoning his vision of achieving a broader understanding among the men and nations of Europe which would extend into all fields. Sometimes, this objective may have been lost to view amid the vicissitudes of the unification of Europe. Nevertheless, that objective has never been disavowed. Now, more than ever, it should serve as a guide, enabling us to rise above our task of daily administration and give it its true and substantial meaning.

=== Helmut Kohl ===
The first Chancellor of post-unification Germany is formally recognized by the European Union as one of 21 "EU pioneers". His acceptance of the demand by French president François Mitterrand to abandon the Deutsche Mark in exchange for France's support for reunification was instrumental in the adoption of the euro.

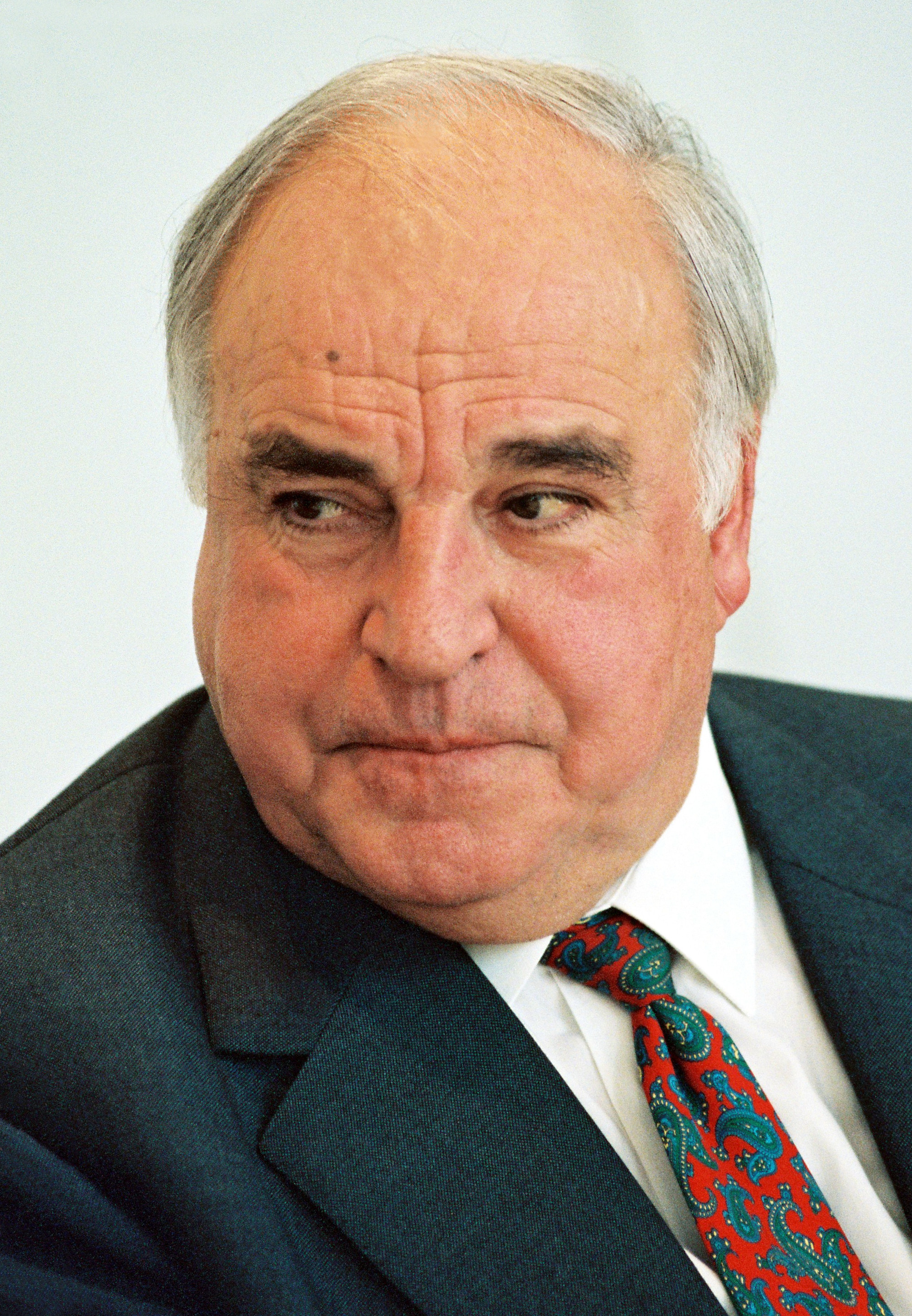

European Council conferred the honorary citizen by resolution at its 74th meeting, held three months after Kohl's electoral defeat in Vienna in December 1998, in recognition of his decisive actions that led to German reunification, the impact of his push for reunification on the consolidation of European integration and toward the formation of the Economic and Monetary Union, and eventually single currency, through the Maastricht Treaty.

Deeply imbued with home values and marked by his youthful experiences during the war and in the post-war period, he remained steadfastly committed to the basic convictions acquired early in life. Above all, his firm belief that ever closer economic and political union in Europe was a force for peace and that it was possible for his homeland to be reunified in that framework was vindicated by the epoch-making events of his term of office. With the same dedication he set to work to heal the damaging divide that split our continent in two.

...

The creation of German unity and the consolidation of European unification, culminating in Economic and Monetary Union, are Dr Helmut Kohl's life's work.

Kohl was further honoured with the European act of state in honour of Helmut Kohl, the first act of state in the history of the European Union, following his death in 2017. In recognition of their role as the architects of the Maastricht Treaty which established the EU and the Euro, Kohl and Mitterrand were recognized as "EU Pioneers" by the European Union in 2021 when it expanded its list of eleven founding fathers to include eight women and the two men, a move to remedy the absence of women in the original list.

=== Jacques Delors ===
A French politician who served as the eighth president of the European Commission from 1985 to 1995, he precipitated and implemented some of the most important steps toward Europe's integration. His three terms saw the creation of the European single market that made the free movement of persons, capital, goods, and services within the European Economic Community (EEC) possible. He headed the Delors Committee, which proposed the monetary union to create the euro, and oversaw the establishment of the European Union through the conclusion of the Maastricht Treaty in 1992 and its coming to force in 1993.

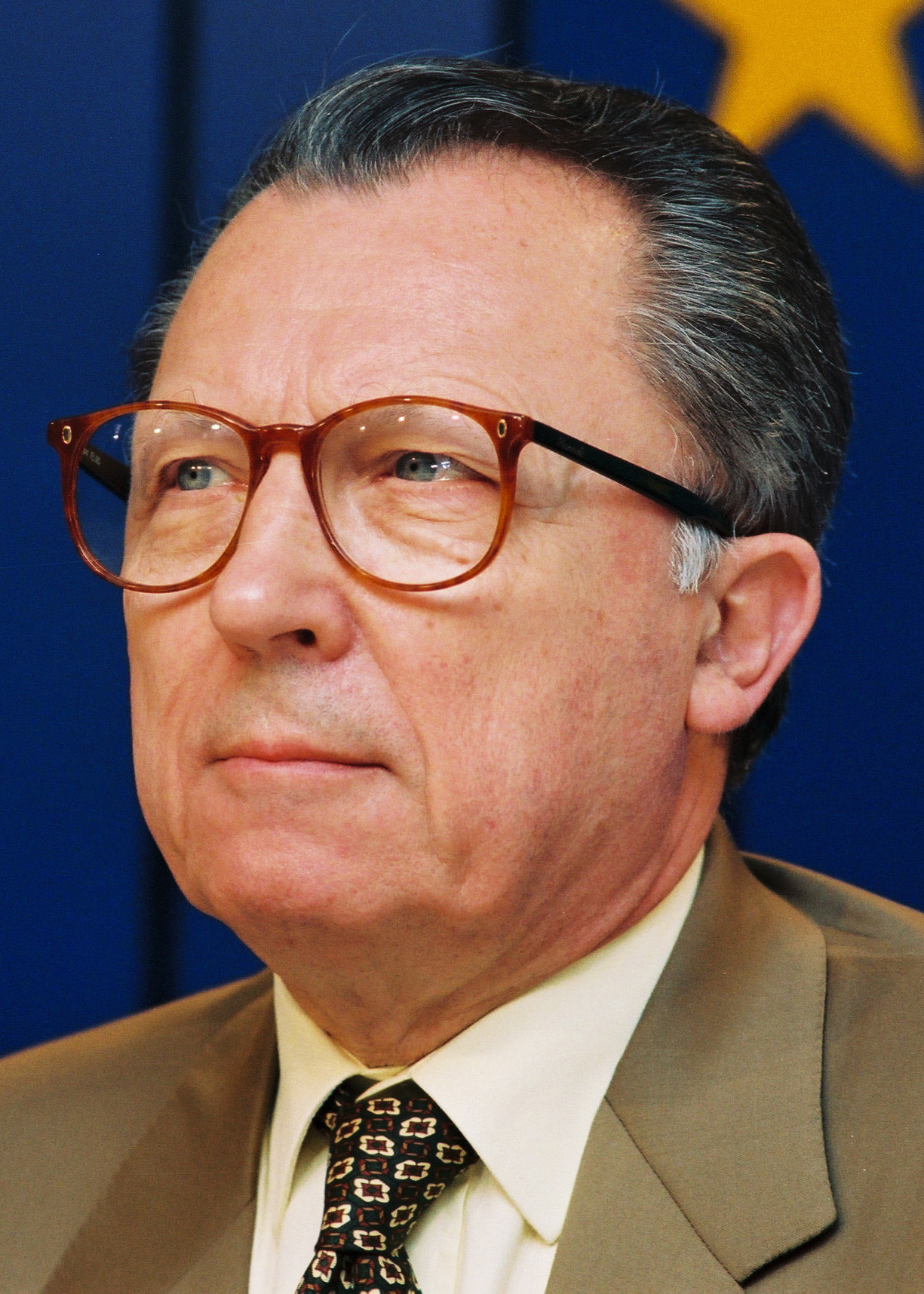

European Council conferred the honorary citizen on June 25, 2015, at its 169th meeting. The resolution connects the EU founding fathers' vision of peace and solidarity to the implementation of the actual administration by specifically naming EU's various milestone accomplishments oversaw by Delors, honouring him as the father of the European Union of the 21st century.

During his term at the head of the Commission from 1985 to 1995, the European Communities, which later became the European Union, made historic progress: the Single European Act, the Treaty of Maastricht, the Economic and Monetary Union, the establishment of the Structural Funds and the creation of the Cohesion Fund, European citizenship, the Erasmus programme, the European Social Charter, the accession of Portugal and Spain, followed by Austria, Sweden and Finland, the launch of the enlargement process following the fall of the Berlin Wall…. All this has profoundly shaped the European Union that we know today. In this sense, it is fair to say that Jacques Delors is certainly a founding father of the European Union of the 21st century. This true European statesman has breathed new hopes and new goals into the European project and brought it from the 20th to the 21st century.
