= Elif Sözen-Kohl =

Turkish banker

- Born: 1969 (age 56–57); Istanbul, Turkey
- Education: B.Sc. in mathematics from the Massachusetts Institute of Technology and M.Sc. in finance from the London Business School
- Occupation: Banker
- Spouse: Peter Kohl
- Children: Leyla Sözen-Kohl
- Relatives: Helmut Kohl (father-in-law)

Elif Sözen-Kohl (born 1969) is a Turkish-born banker who resides in London and in Switzerland. She is married to Peter Kohl and was the daughter-in-law of former German Chancellor Helmut Kohl.

Elif Sözen is the daughter of an industrialist from Istanbul, Kemal Sözen, the head of the metal company Kale Kalip Makina Sanayii. She received a B.Sc. in mathematics from the Massachusetts Institute of Technology and an M.Sc. in finance from the London Business School. Following her studies she worked on international macroeconomic policy making at the Kiel Institute for the World Economy in Germany. In the early 1990s, she was part of Harvard economist Jeffrey Sachs' team in Moscow which advised the Russian Government on its transition to a market economy following the fall of the Soviet Union. She worked at Goldman Sachs' debt capital markets group in London from 1993 to 1995 and as a vice president with JP Morgan in London from 1996 to 2000. In 2003, she was asked to become an advisor to the Turkish Treasury by the World Bank. She later became chief investment officer and a director of Eagle Advisors in Geneva. She is a member of the Board of Directors of the Salzburg Global Seminar.

While attending MIT, she met Peter Kohl. They married in May 2001, after living together for over ten years. Their relationship and later marriage received much international media attention. Reflecting the multicultural nature of the event, the celebration in Istanbul lasted three days and three marriage ceremonies were involved: a Catholic marriage, an Islamic marriage and a Turkish civil marriage. They have a daughter, Leyla, born in 2002.
