= Helmut Kohl =

Chancellor of Germany from 1982 to 1998

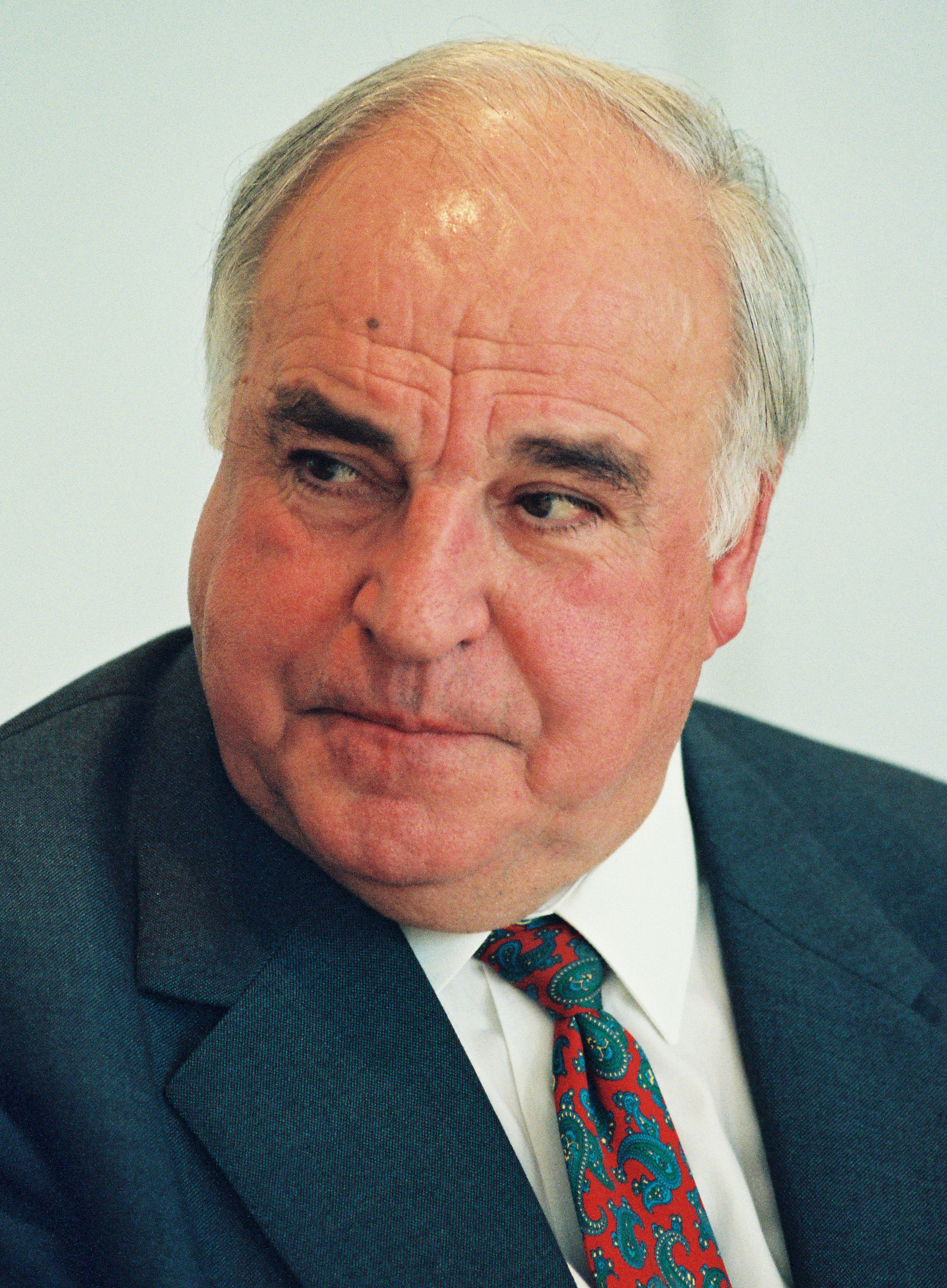
- Kohl in 1996

Chancellor of Germany (Note: Due to the division of Germany, Kohl was only the Federal Chancellor in West Germany until 2 October 1990. From 3 October 1990 until 1998, he was Federal Chancellor of the reunified Germany. The term West Germany is only the common English name for the Federal Republic of Germany between its formation on 23 May 1949 and the German reunification through the accession of East Germany (GDR) in October 1990. The office of chancellor never existed in the GDR.)
- In office 1 October 1982 – 27 October 1998
- President: Karl Carstens; Richard von Weizsäcker; Roman Herzog
- Vice-Chancellor: Hans-Dietrich Genscher; Jürgen Möllemann; Klaus Kinkel
- Preceded by: Helmut Schmidt
- Succeeded by: Gerhard Schröder

Leader of the Christian Democratic Union
- In office 12 June 1973 – 7 November 1998
- General Secretary: Kurt Biedenkopf; Heiner Geißler; Volker Rühe; Peter Hintze
- Preceded by: Rainer Barzel
- Succeeded by: Wolfgang Schäuble

Leader of the Opposition
- In office 13 December 1976 – 1 October 1982
- Chancellor: Helmut Schmidt
- Preceded by: Karl Carstens
- Succeeded by: Herbert Wehner

Leader of the CDU/CSU group in the Bundestag
- In office 13 December 1976 – 4 October 1982
- Chief Whip: Philipp Jenninger
- First Deputy: Friedrich Zimmermann
- Preceded by: Karl Carstens
- Succeeded by: Alfred Dregger

Minister-President of Rhineland-Palatinate
- In office 19 May 1969 – 2 December 1976
- Deputy: Otto Meyer
- Preceded by: Peter Altmeier
- Succeeded by: Bernhard Vogel
Parliamentary constituencies
Member of the Bundestag for Rhineland-Palatinate
In office 26 October 1998 – 17 October 2002
Preceded by	Multi-member district
Succeeded by	Multi-member district
Electoral list	Christian Democratic Union
In office 20 December 1990 – 26 October 1998
Preceded by	Manfred Reimann
Succeeded by	Doris Barnett
Constituency	Ludwigshafen
In office 14 December 1976 – 20 December 1990
Preceded by	Multi-member district
Succeeded by	Multi-member district
Electoral list	Christian Democratic Union
Member of the Landtag of Rhineland-Palatinate
In office 19 May 1959 – 21 December 1976
Preceded by	Multi-member district
Succeeded by	Hans-Dieter Busch (1977)
Constituency	Wahlkreis 6 (1959–1971); Wahlkreis 5 (1971–1975); Wahlkreis 3 (1975–1976)

Personal details
- Born: Helmut Josef Michael Kohl; 3 April 1930 Ludwigshafen, Rhineland-Palatinate, Germany
- Died: 16 June 2017 (aged 87) Ludwigshafen, Rhineland-Palatinate, Germany
- Resting place: Cathedral Chapter Cemetery, Speyer
- Party: Christian Democratic Union (1946–2017)
- Spouses: Hannelore Renner (m. 1960; died 2001) Maike Richter (m. 2008)
- Children: Walter; Peter
- Education: Heidelberg University
- Helmut Kohl's voice Kohl delivering remarks on US president Ronald Reagan's arrival at Bitburg Air Base; Recorded 5 May 1985

Helmut Josef Michael Kohl (Note: German pronunciation: [ˈhɛlmuːt ˈkoːl]) (3 April 1930 – 16 June 2017) was a German politician who served as chancellor of Germany from 1982 to 1998. He was leader of the Christian Democratic Union (CDU) from 1973 to 1998 and oversaw the end of the Cold War, German reunification, and the creation of the European Union (EU). Kohl's 16-year tenure is the longest in German post-war history, lasting just nine days longer than Angela Merkel's tenure, and is the longest for any elected chancellor of Germany.

Born in Ludwigshafen to a Catholic family, Kohl joined the CDU in 1946 at the age of 16. He earned a PhD in history at Heidelberg University in 1958 and worked as a business executive before becoming a full-time politician. He was elected as the youngest member of the Parliament of Rhineland-Palatinate in 1959 and from 1969 to 1976 was minister president of the Rhineland-Palatinate state. Viewed during the 1960s and the early 1970s as a progressive within the CDU, he was elected national chairman of the party in 1973. After he had become party leader, Kohl was increasingly seen as a more conservative figure. In the 1976 and 1980 federal elections, his party performed well, but the social-liberal government of social democrat Helmut Schmidt was able to remain in power. After Schmidt had lost the support of the liberal FDP in 1982, Kohl was elected Chancellor through a constructive vote of no confidence, forming a coalition government with the FDP. Kohl chaired the G7 in 1985 and 1992.

As Chancellor, Kohl was committed to European integration and especially to the Franco-German relationship; he was also a steadfast ally of the United States and supported Ronald Reagan's more aggressive policies to weaken the Soviet Union. Following the Revolutions of 1989, his government acted decisively, culminating in the German reunification in 1990. Kohl and French president François Mitterrand were the architects of the Maastricht Treaty, which established the European Union and the Euro currency. Kohl was also a central figure in the eastern enlargement of the EU, and his government led the effort to push for international recognition of Croatia, Slovenia, and Bosnia and Herzegovina when the states declared independence. He played a controversial role in resolving the Bosnian War. Domestically Kohl's policies from 1990 focused on integrating former East Germany into reunified Germany, and he moved the federal capital from the "provisional capital" Bonn back to Berlin, although he never resided there because the government offices were only relocated in 1999. Kohl also greatly increased federal spending on arts and culture. After his chancellorship, Kohl became honorary chairman of the CDU in 1998 but resigned from the position in 2000 in the wake of the CDU donations scandal, which damaged his reputation domestically.

Kohl received the 1988 Charlemagne Prize and was named Honorary Citizen of Europe by the European Council in 1998. Following his death, Kohl was honoured with the first-ever European act of state in Strasbourg. Kohl was described as "the greatest European leader of the second half of the 20th century" by US presidents George H. W. Bush and Bill Clinton.

== Life ==
=== Youth and education ===
Kohl was born on 3 April 1930 in Ludwigshafen. He was the third child of Hans Kohl (3 January 1887 – 19 October 1975), a Bavarian army veteran and civil servant, and his wife, Cäcilie (née Schnur; 17 November 1892 – 1 August 1977).

Kohl's family was conservative and Catholic and remained loyal to the Catholic Centre Party before and after 1933. His elder brother died serving in the Wehrmacht in World War II at the age of 18 in 1944. At the age of ten, Kohl joined, like most children in Germany at the time, the Deutsches Jungvolk, a section of the Hitler Youth. Aged 15, on 20 April 1945, Kohl was sworn into the Hitler Youth by leader Artur Axmann at Berchtesgaden, just days before the end of the war, as membership was mandatory for all boys of his age. Kohl was also drafted for military service in 1945; he was not involved in any combat, a fact he later referred to as the "mercy of late birth" (German: Gnade der späten Geburt).

Kohl attended the Ruprecht Elementary School and continued at the Max-Planck-Gymnasium. After graduating in 1950, Kohl began to study law in Frankfurt am Main, spending two semesters commuting between Ludwigshafen and Frankfurt. Here, Kohl heard lectures from Carlo Schmid and Walter Hallstein, among others. In 1951, Kohl switched to Heidelberg University, where he studied history and political science. Kohl was the first in his family to attend university.

=== Life before politics ===
After graduating in 1956, Kohl became a fellow at the Alfred Weber Institute of Heidelberg University under Dolf Sternberger where he was an active member of the student society AIESEC. In 1958, Kohl received his doctorate in history for his dissertation Die politische Entwicklung in der Pfalz und das Wiedererstehen der Parteien nach 1945 ("The Political Developments in the Palatinate and the Reconstruction of Political Parties after 1945"), under the supervision of the historian Walther Peter Fuchs. After that, Kohl entered business, first as an assistant to the director of a foundry in Ludwigshafen, then, in April 1960, as a manager for the Industrial Union for Chemistry in Ludwigshafen.

=== Early political career ===
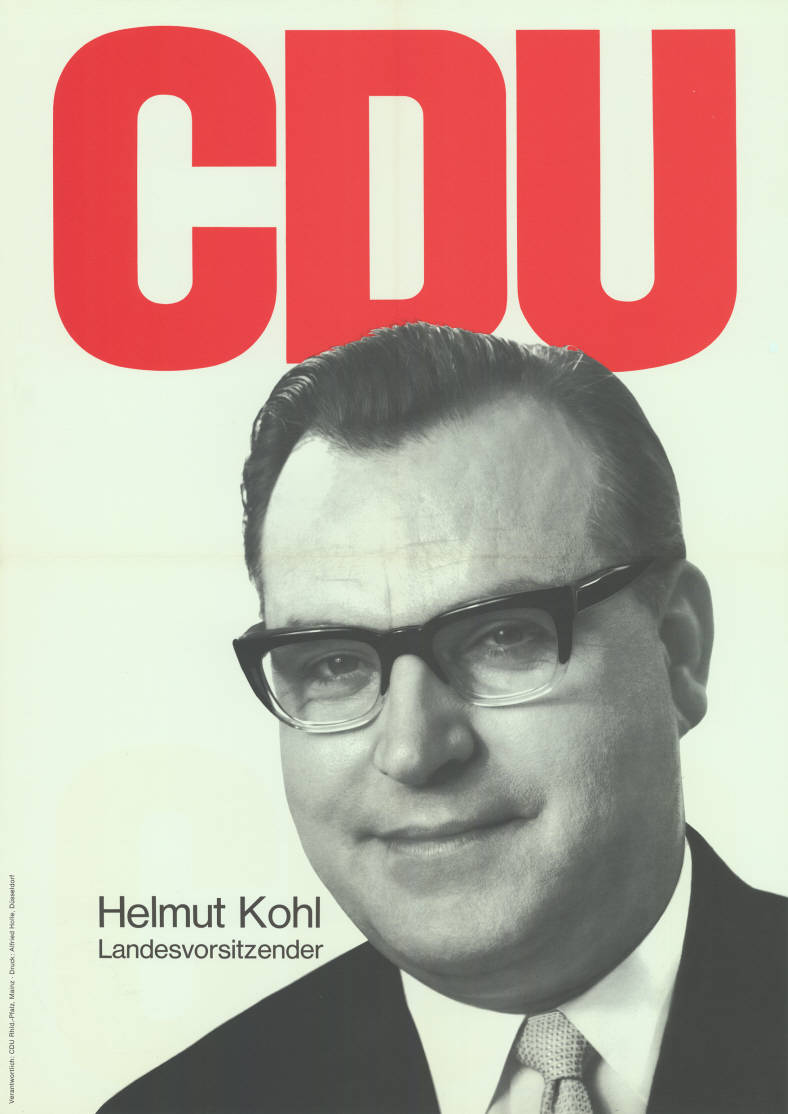
Kohl in 1967 as the CDU Rhineland-Palatinate state party chairman

In 1946, Kohl joined the recently founded CDU, becoming a full member once he turned 18 in 1948. In 1947, Kohl was one of the co-founders of the Junge Union-branch in Ludwigshafen, the CDU youth organisation. In 1953, Kohl joined the board of the Palatinate branch of the CDU. In 1954, Kohl became vice-chair of the Junge Union in Rhineland-Palatinate, being a member of the board until 1961.

In January 1955, Kohl ran for a seat on the board of the Rhineland-Palatinate CDU, losing just narrowly to the state's Minister of Family Affairs, Franz-Josef Wuermeling. Kohl was still able to take up a seat on the board, being sent there by his local party branch as a delegate. During his early years in the party, Kohl aimed to open it towards the young generation, turning away from a close relationship with the churches.

In early 1959, Kohl was elected chairman of the Ludwigshafen district branch of the CDU, as well as a candidate for the upcoming state elections. On 19 April 1959, Kohl was elected as the youngest member of the state diet, the Landtag of Rhineland-Palatinate. In 1960, he was also elected to the municipal council of Ludwigshafen, where he served as leader of the CDU party until 1969. When the chairman of the CDU parliamentary group in the Landtag, Wilhelm Boden, died in late 1961, Kohl moved up into a deputy position.

In 1963, following the next state election, he took over as chairman, a position he held until he became Minister-President in 1969. In 1966, Kohl and the incumbent minister-president and state party chairman, Peter Altmeier, agreed to share duties. In March 1966, Kohl was elected as chairman of the party in Rhineland-Palatinate, while Altmeier once again ran for minister-president in the state elections in 1967, agreeing to hand the post over to Kohl after two years, halfway into the legislative period.

=== Minister-President of Rhineland-Palatinate ===
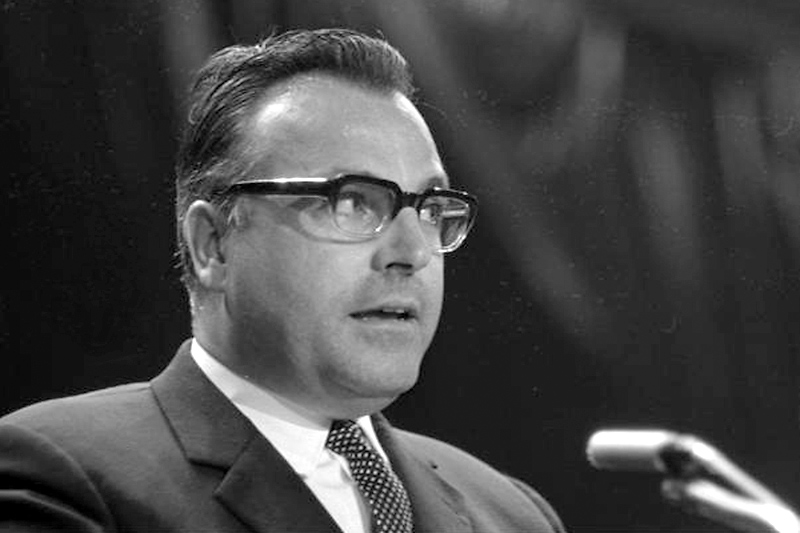
Kohl in 1969

Kohl was elected minister-president of Rhineland-Palatinate on 19 May 1969, as the successor to Peter Altmeier. As of 2017, he was the youngest person ever to be elected as head of government in a German Bundesland. While in office, Kohl acted as a reformer, focusing on school and education. His government abolished school corporal punishment and the parochial school, topics that had been controversial with the conservative wing of his party.

During his term, Kohl founded the University of Trier-Kaiserslautern. He also finalised a territorial reform of the state, standardising codes of law and re-aligning districts, an act that he had already pursued under Altmeier's tenure, taking the chairmanship of the Landtag's committee on the reform. After taking office, Kohl established two new ministries, one for economy and transportation and one for social matters, with the latter going to Heiner Geißler, who would work closely with Kohl for the next twenty years.

=== Federal party level, election as chairman of the CDU ===
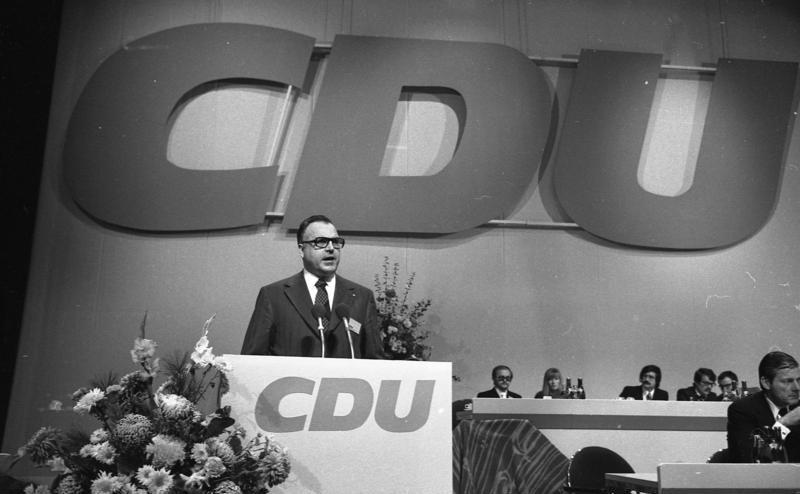
Kohl at the CDU national party convention in Hamburg, 1973

Kohl moved up into the federal board (Vorstand) of the CDU in 1964. Two years later, shortly before his election as chairman of the party in Rhineland-Palatinate, he failed at an attempt to be voted into the executive committee (Präsidium) of the party. After the CDU lost its involvement in the federal government for the first time since the end of World War II in the 1969 election, Kohl was elected into the committee. While former chancellor Kurt Georg Kiesinger remained chairman of the CDU until 1971, it was now parliamentary chairman Rainer Barzel who led the opposition against the newly formed social-liberal coalition of Willy Brandt.

As a member of the board and the executive committee, Kohl pushed towards party reform, supporting liberal stances in education and social policies, including employee participation. When a proposal by the board was put to vote at a party convention in early 1971 in Düsseldorf, Kohl was unable to prevail against protest coming from the conservative wing of the party around Alfred Dregger and the sister party CSU, costing him support at the liberal wing of the party. To make matters worse, in a mistake during the voting process, Kohl voted against the proposal, further angering his supporters, such as party treasurer Walther Leisler Kiep.

Nevertheless, when Kiesinger stepped down as party chairman in 1971, Kohl was a candidate for his succession. He was unsuccessful, losing the vote to Barzel 344 to 174. In April 1972, in the light of Brandt's Ostpolitik, the CDU aimed to depose Brandt and his government in a constructive vote of no confidence, replacing him with Barzel. The attempt failed, as two members of the opposition voted against Barzel. After Barzel also lost the general election later that year, the path was free for Kohl to take over. After Barzel announced on 10 May 1973 that he would not run for the post of party chairman again, Kohl succeeded him at a party convention in Bonn on 12 June 1973, amassing 520 of 600 votes, with him as the only candidate.

Facing stiff opposition from the left wing of the party, Kohl initially expected only to serve as chairman for a couple of months, as his critics planned to replace him at another convention set for November in Hamburg. Kohl received the support of his party and remained in office, not least due to the lauded work of Kurt Biedenkopf, whom Kohl had brought in as Secretary General of the CDU. Kohl remained chairman until 1998.

When Chancellor Brandt stepped down in May 1974 following the unravelling of the Guillaume Affair, Kohl urged his party to restrain from Schadenfreude and not to use the position of their political opponent for "cheap polemics". In June, Kohl campaigned during the state elections in Lower Saxony for his party colleague Wilfried Hasselmann, leading the CDU to a strong result of 48.8% of the vote, even though it proved not enough to prevent a continuation of the social-liberal coalition in the state.

=== First candidacy for the chancellorship and the 1976 Bundestag election ===
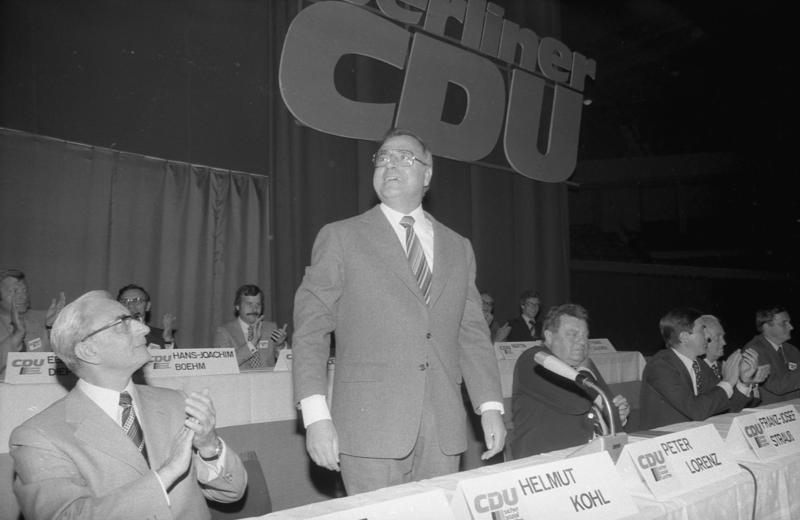
Kohl in Berlin at a campaign event for the 1976 West German federal election

On 9 March 1975, Kohl and the CDU faced re-election in Rhineland-Palatinate. What placed Kohl, who intended to run for chancellor, under increased pressure was the fact that the sister parties of CDU and CSU were set to decide upon their leading candidate for the upcoming federal elections in mid-1975. CSU chairman Franz Josef Strauss had ambitions to run and publicly put Kohl under pressure over what result would be acceptable in the state elections.

On election day, the CDU achieved a result of 53.9%, the highest-ever result in the state, consolidating Kohl's position. Strauß's bid for the chancellorship was further put into jeopardy when in March 1975 the magazine Der Spiegel published a transcript of a speech held in November 1974, in which Strauß claimed that the Red Army Faction, a West German armed struggle group responsible for multiple attacks at the time, had sympathizers in the ranks of the SPD and FDP. The scandal deeply unsettled the public and effectively ruled out Strauß for the candidacy.

On 12 May 1975, the federal board of the CDU unanimously nominated Kohl as the candidate for the general elections, without consulting their Bavarian sister party beforehand. In reaction, the CSU nominated Strauß and only a mediation by former chancellor Kiesinger was able to resolve the issue and confirm Kohl as the candidate for both parties. In June 1975, Kohl was also re-elected as party chairman, achieving a result of 98.44%.

Strauß took the discord as a starting point to evaluate chances of expanding the CSU on the federal level, such as having separate electoral lists in the states of North Rhine-Westphalia, Lower Saxony, Hamburg, and Bremen. He hoped to draw away right-wing voters from the FDP towards the CSU and went as far as having private meetings with industrialists in North Rhine-Westphalia. These attempts led to discomfort within the membership base of the CDU and hampered both parties' chances in the upcoming elections. Kohl remained silent during these tensions, which some interpreted as a lack of leadership, while others, such as future president Karl Carstens, praised him for seeking a consensus at the centre of the party.

In the 1976 federal election, the CDU/CSU coalition performed very well, winning 48.6% of the vote. They were kept out of government by the centre-left cabinet formed by the Social Democratic Party of Germany (SPD) and Free Democratic Party (FDP), led by Social Democrat Helmut Schmidt. Kohl then retired as minister-president of Rhineland-Palatinate to become the leader of the CDU/CSU in the Bundestag. He was succeeded by Bernhard Vogel.

=== Leader of the opposition ===
In the 1980 federal elections, Kohl had to play second fiddle when CSU leader Franz Josef Strauß became the CDU/CSU's candidate for chancellor. Strauß was also unable to defeat the coalition of the SPD and the FDP. Unlike Kohl, Strauß did not want to continue as the leader of the CDU/CSU and remained Minister-President of Bavaria. Kohl remained as leader of the opposition under the third Schmidt cabinet (1980–1982). On 17 September 1982, a conflict of economic policy occurred between the governing SPD/FDP coalition partners. The FDP wanted to radically liberalise the labour market, while the SPD preferred greater job security. The FDP began talks with the CDU/CSU to form a new government.

== Chancellor of Germany (1982–1998) ==
=== Rise to power and first cabinet, 1982–1983 ===
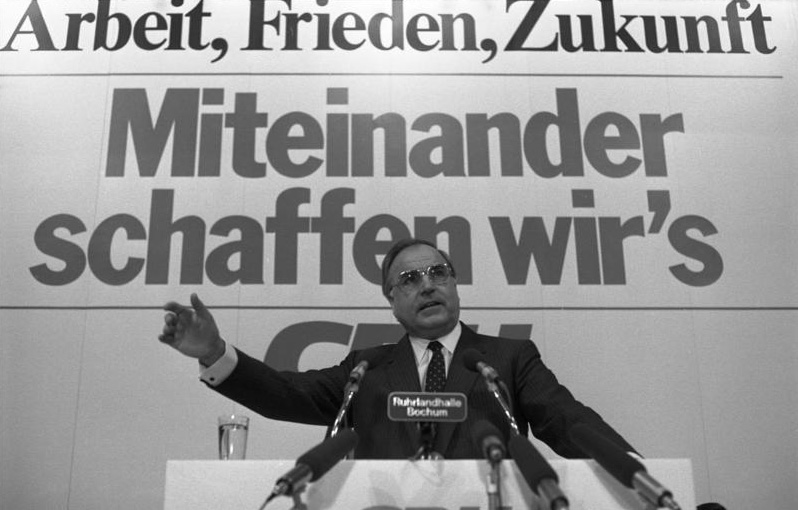
Kohl at a campaign event for the 1983 West German federal election

On 1 October 1982, the CDU proposed a constructive vote of no confidence, which was supported by the FDP. The motion carried — to date, the only time that a chancellor has been deposed in this manner. Three days later, the Bundestag voted in a new CDU/CSU-FDP coalition cabinet, with Kohl as chancellor. Many of the important details of the new coalition had been hammered out on 20 September, though minor details were reportedly still being negotiated as the vote took place.

Though Kohl's election was done according to the Basic Law, it came amid some controversy. The FDP had fought its 1980 campaign on the side of the SPD and even placed Chancellor Schmidt on some of their campaign posters. There were also doubts that the new government had the support of a majority of the people. In answer, the new government aimed for new elections at the earliest possible date. Polls suggested that a clear majority was indeed within reach.

As the Basic Law only allows the dissolution of parliament after an unsuccessful confidence motion, Kohl had to take another controversial move: he called for a confidence vote only a month after being sworn in, which he intentionally lost because the members of his coalition abstained. President Karl Carstens then dissolved the Bundestag at Kohl's request and called new elections.

The move was controversial, as the coalition parties denied their votes to the same man they had elected Chancellor a month before and whom they wanted to re-elect after the parliamentary election. However, this step was condoned by the German Federal Constitutional Court as a legal instrument and was again applied by SPD Chancellor Gerhard Schröder in 2005.

During his first term in terms of economy, Kohl wanted to move back to ordoliberalism.

=== Second cabinet, 1983–1987 ===
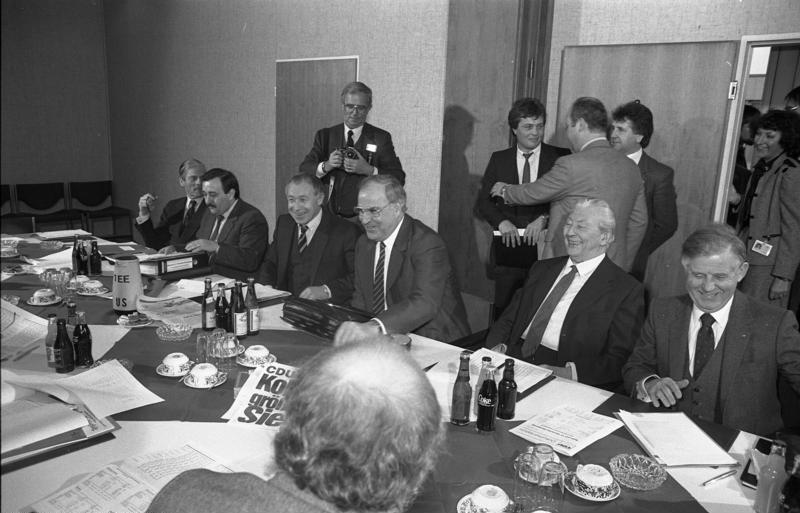
Kohl and former chancellor Kiesinger in 1983

In the federal elections of March 1983, Kohl won a resounding victory. The CDU/CSU won 48.8%, while the FDP won 7.0%. Some opposition members of the Bundestag, angered by what SPD figures in the Hessian regional elections had called the FDP's "betrayal in Bonn", asked the Federal Constitutional Court to declare the whole proceeding unconstitutional. It denied their claim but did set restrictions on a similar move in the future. The second Kohl cabinet pushed through several controversial plans, including the stationing of NATO midrange missiles, against major opposition from the peace movement.

On 22 September 1984, Kohl met French president François Mitterrand at Verdun, where the Battle of Verdun between France and Germany had taken place during World War I. Together, they commemorated the deaths of both World Wars. The photograph, which depicted their minutes-long handshake, became an important symbol of French-German reconciliation. Kohl and Mitterrand developed a close political relationship, forming an important motor for European integration.

Together they laid the foundations for European projects, like Eurocorps and Arte. In 1985, alongside European leaders from 16 other countries, they founded Eureka: a research and development network of national funding ministries and agencies (distinct from the European Union) that fund and support collaborative international projects. This French-German cooperation was also vital for important European projects, like the Treaty of Maastricht and the Euro.

In 1985, Kohl and US President Ronald Reagan, as part of a plan to observe the 40th anniversary of V-E Day, saw an opportunity to demonstrate the strength of the friendship that existed between Germany and its former foe. During a November 1984 visit to the White House, Kohl appealed to Reagan to join him in symbolising the reconciliation of their two countries at a German military cemetery. Reagan visited Germany as part of the 11th G7 summit in Bonn; then he and Kohl visited Bergen-Belsen concentration camp on 5 May and the German military cemetery at Bitburg. There was widespread outrage when the media reported that this cemetery had the graves of SS soldiers but no Americans. Reagan considered that escalating Cold War confrontations with the Kremlin required his strong support for Kohl.

==== Domestic policies ====
Kohl's chancellorship presided over a number of innovative policy measures. Extensions in unemployment benefits for older claimants were introduced, while the benefit for the young unemployed was extended to age 21. In 1986, a child-rearing allowance was introduced to benefit parents when at least one was employed. Informal carers were offered an attendance allowance together with tax incentives, both of which were established with the tax reforms of 1990, and were also guaranteed up to 25 hours a month of professional support, which was supplemented by four weeks of annual holiday relief. In 1984, an early retirement scheme was introduced that offered incentives to employers to replace elderly workers with applicants off the unemployment register. In 1989, a partial retirement plan was introduced under which elderly employees could work half-time and receive 70% of their former salary, "and be credited with 90% of the full social insurance entitlement." In 1984, a Mother and Child Fund was established, providing discretionary grants "to forestall abortions on grounds of material hardship," and in 1986, a 10 Bn DM package of Erziehungsgeld (childcare allowance) was introduced, although according to various studies, this latter initiative was heavily counterbalanced by cuts. In 1989, special provisions were introduced for the older unemployed.

Kohl's time as Chancellor also saw some controversial decisions in the field of social policy. Student aid was made reimbursable to the state while the Health Care Reform Act of 1989 introduced the concept by which patients pay up front and are reimbursed, while increasing patient co-payments for hospitalisation, spa visits, dental prostheses, and prescription drugs. In addition, while a 1986 Baby-Year Pensions reform granted women born after 1921 one year of work-credit per child, lawmakers were forced by public protest to phase in supplementary pension benefits for mothers who were born before the cut-off year.

=== Third cabinet, 1987–1991 ===
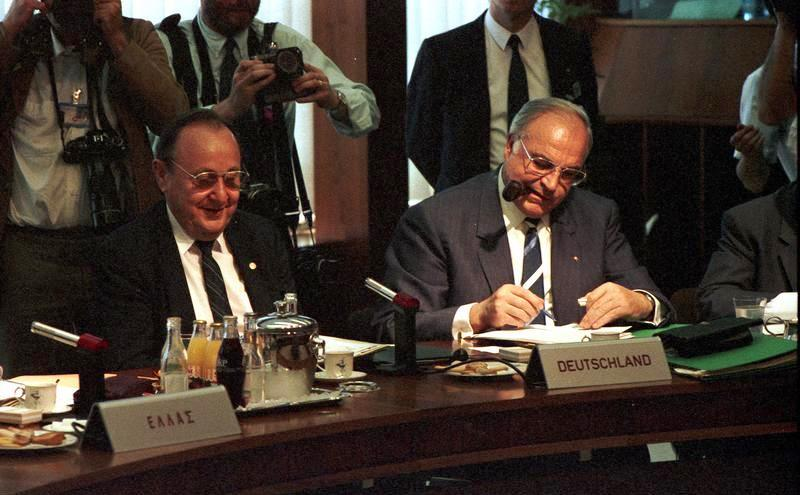
Kohl at a 1987 European Council meeting with vice-chancellor and foreign minister Hans-Dietrich Genscher

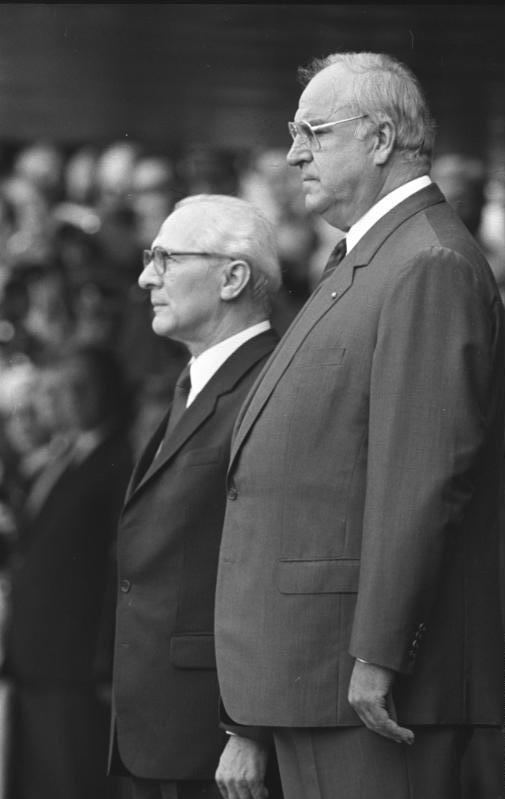
Kohl (right) and Erich Honecker at the Federal Chancellery in Bonn, 1987

After the 1987 federal elections, Kohl won a slightly reduced majority and formed his third cabinet. The SPD's candidate for chancellor was the Minister-President of North Rhine-Westphalia, Johannes Rau.

In 1987, Kohl hosted East German leader Erich Honecker – the first ever visit by an East German head of state to West Germany. This is generally seen as a sign that Kohl pursued Ostpolitik, a policy of détente between East and West that had been begun by the SPD-led governments (and strongly opposed by Kohl's own CDU) during the 1970s.

==== Internal struggle for CDU leadership ====
The CDU's general secretary, Heiner Geißler, considered the party to be in a downward spiral following the relatively poor showing in the 1987 elections. Behind the scenes, he attempted to find a majority to unseat Kohl as the party's chairman and replace him with Lothar Späth, the Minister-president of Baden-Württemberg. Before the CDU party convention in Bremen started on 11 September 1989, Kohl was diagnosed with an inflammation of his prostate. His doctor recommended immediate surgery, but Kohl refused to miss the convention and attended while wearing a catheter and with his doctor by his side, whom he introduced as his new speech writer. In the end, the "coup" was unsuccessful, as Kohl was re-elected as chairman with 79.52% of the votes. Späth, who did not stand for the position of chairman after support for Kohl became apparent, was punished by his party, failing to be elected as vice-chairman with just 357 of 731 votes. Geißler meanwhile was relieved of his duties as general secretary and replaced by Volker Rühe.

==== Road to reunification ====
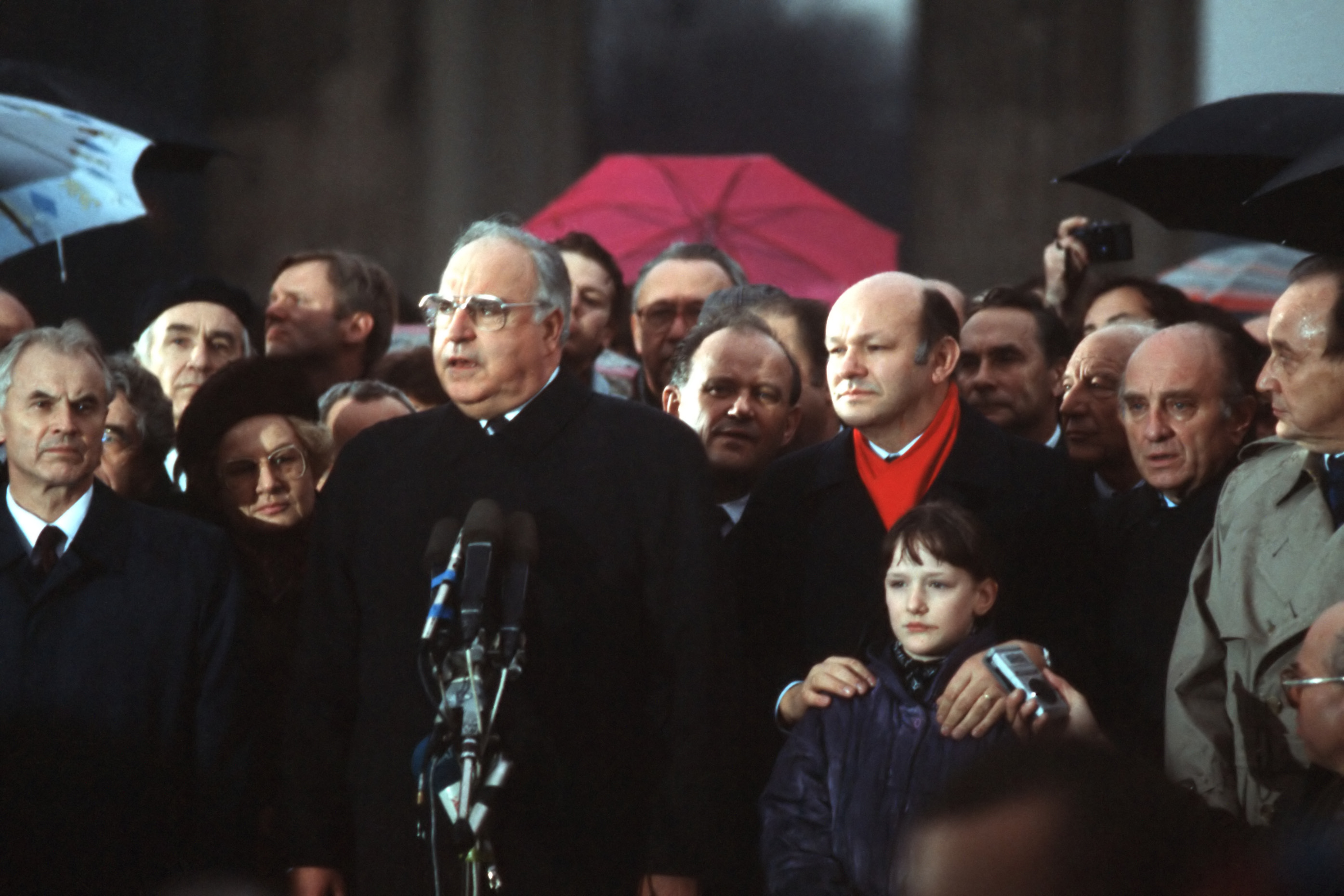
Kohl speaks at the official opening of the Brandenburg Gate in 1989.

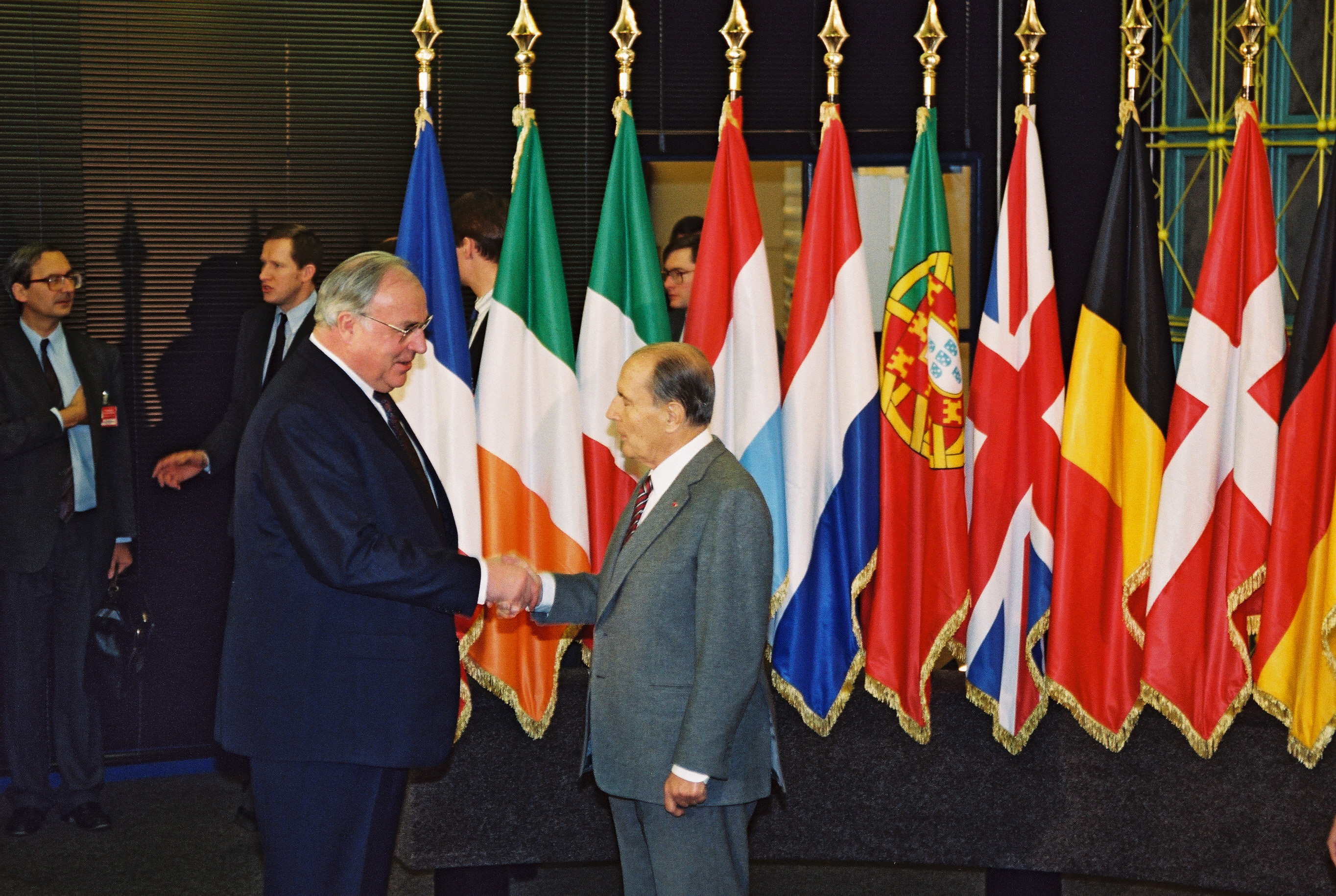
Kohl and French President François Mitterrand at the European Council Summit in Strasbourg, 9 December 1989

Following the breach of the Berlin Wall and the collapse of the East German Communist regime in 1989, Kohl's handling of the East German issue would become the turning point of his chancellorship. Kohl, like most West Germans, was initially caught unaware when the Socialist Unity Party was toppled in late 1989. Well aware of his constitutional mandate to seek German unity, he immediately moved to make it a reality. Taking advantage of the historic political changes occurring in East Germany, Kohl presented a ten-point plan for "Overcoming the division of Germany and Europe" without consulting his coalition partner, the FDP, or the Western Allies. In February 1990, he visited the Soviet Union seeking a guarantee from Mikhail Gorbachev that the USSR would allow German reunification to proceed. One month later, the Party of Democratic Socialism – the renamed SED – was roundly defeated by a grand coalition headed by the East German counterpart of Kohl's CDU, which ran on a platform of speedy reunification.

On 18 May 1990, Kohl signed an economic and social union treaty with East Germany. This treaty stipulated that when reunification took place, it would be under the quicker provisions of Article 23 of the Basic Law. That article stated that any new states could adhere to the Basic Law by a simple majority vote. The alternative would have been the more protracted route of drafting a completely new constitution for the newly reunified country, as provided by Article 146 of the Basic Law. However, the Article 146 process would have opened up contentious issues in West Germany. Even without this to consider, by this time, East Germany was in a state of utter collapse. In contrast, an Article 23 reunification could be completed in as little as six months.

Over the objections of Bundesbank president Karl Otto Pöhl, he allowed a 1:1 exchange rate for wages, interest and rent between the West and East Marks. In the end, this policy would seriously hurt companies in the new federal states. Together with Foreign Minister Hans-Dietrich Genscher, Kohl was able to resolve talks with the former Allies of World War II to allow German reunification. He received assurances from Gorbachev that a reunified Germany would be able to choose which international alliance it wanted to join, although Kohl made no secret that he wanted the reunified Germany to inherit West Germany's seats at NATO and the EC.

A reunification treaty was signed on 31 August 1990 and was overwhelmingly approved by both parliaments on 20 September 1990. At midnight Central European Time on 3 October 1990, East Germany officially ceased to exist, and its territory joined the Federal Republic as the five states of Brandenburg, Mecklenburg-Vorpommern, Saxony, Saxony-Anhalt and Thuringia. These states had been the original five states of East Germany before being abolished in 1952 and had been reconstituted in August. East and West Berlin were reunited as a city-state, which became the capital of the enlarged Federal Republic.

After the fall of the Berlin Wall, Kohl affirmed that former German territories east of the Oder-Neisse line were definitively part of Poland, thereby relinquishing any claim Germany had to them in a treaty signed on 14 November 1990 in Warsaw. Though earlier in March of that year, Kohl caused a diplomatic firestorm when he suggested that a reunified Germany would not accept the Oder–Neisse line, and implied that the Federal Republic might wish to restore the frontier of 1937, by force if necessary. After the statement caused a major international backlash that threatened to halt German reunification, Kohl retracted his comments after knuckling under international rebuke and assured both the United States and the Soviet Union that a reunified Germany would accept the Oder–Neisse line as the final border between Poland and Germany. In 1993, Kohl confirmed, via treaty with the Czech Republic, that Germany would no longer bring forward territorial claims as to the pre-1945 ethnic German Sudetenland. This treaty was a disappointment for the German Heimatvertriebene ("displaced persons").

=== After reunification, 1990–1998 ===
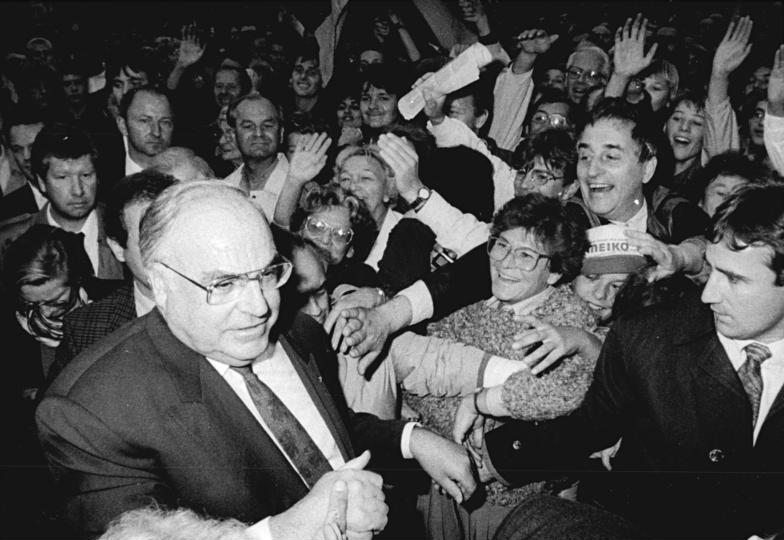
Kohl in 1990

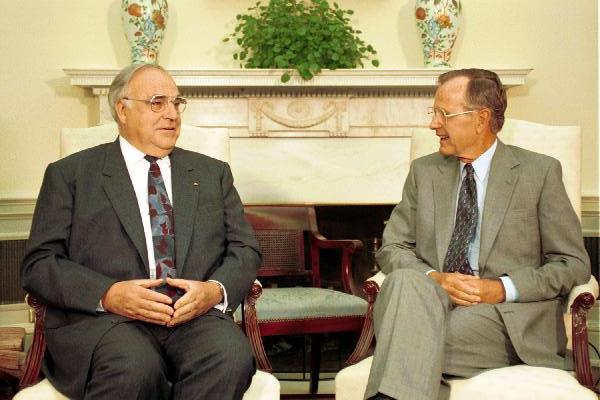
Kohl meets with U.S. President George H. W. Bush in Washington, D.C., 16 September 1991

Reunification placed Kohl in a momentarily unassailable position. In the 1990 elections – the first free, fair and democratic all-German elections since the Weimar Republic era – Kohl won by a landslide over opposition candidate and Minister-President of Saarland, Oskar Lafontaine. He then formed his fourth cabinet.

After the federal elections of 1994, Kohl was reelected with a somewhat reduced majority, defeating Minister-President of Rhineland-Palatinate Rudolf Scharping. The SPD was able to win a majority in the Bundesrat, which significantly limited Kohl's power. In foreign politics, Kohl was more successful, for instance, getting Frankfurt am Main as the seat for the European Central Bank. In 1997, Kohl received the Vision for Europe Award for his efforts in the unification of Europe.

By the late 1990s, Kohl's popularity had dropped amid rising unemployment. He was defeated by a large margin in the 1998 federal elections by the Minister-President of Lower Saxony, Gerhard Schröder.

The future Chancellor Angela Merkel started her political career as Kohl's protégée and was known in the 1990s as "Kohl's girl"; in January 1991, he lifted the then little-known Merkel to national prominence by appointing her to the federal cabinet.

== Retirement ==
A red–green coalition government led by Schröder replaced Kohl's government on 27 October 1998. He immediately resigned as CDU leader and largely retired from politics. He remained a member of the Bundestag until he decided not to run for reelection in the 2002 election.

=== CDU finance affair, 1999–2000 ===
Kohl's life after political office in the beginning was dominated by the CDU donations scandal. The party financing scandal became public in 1999 when it was discovered that the CDU had received and kept illegal donations during Kohl's leadership. Der Spiegel reported, "It was never suggested that Kohl benefited personally from political donations – but he did lead the party financial system outside of the legal boundaries, doing such things as opening secret bank accounts and establishing civic associations that could act as middlemen, or procurement agencies, for campaign donations." While his reputation in Germany suffered in the immediate years after the finance affair, it did not affect his reputation internationally; outside of Germany he was perceived as a great European statesman and remembered for his role in solving the five great problems of his era: German reunification, European integration, the relations with Russia after the fall of the Soviet Union and the Bosnian War.

=== Life after politics ===
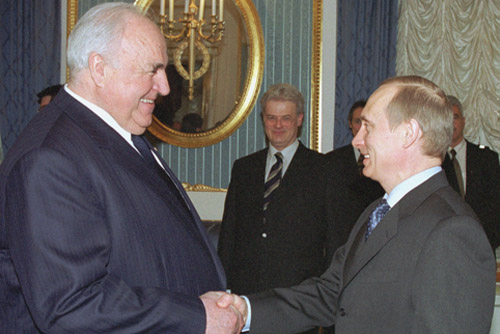
Kohl and Vladimir Putin in 2002

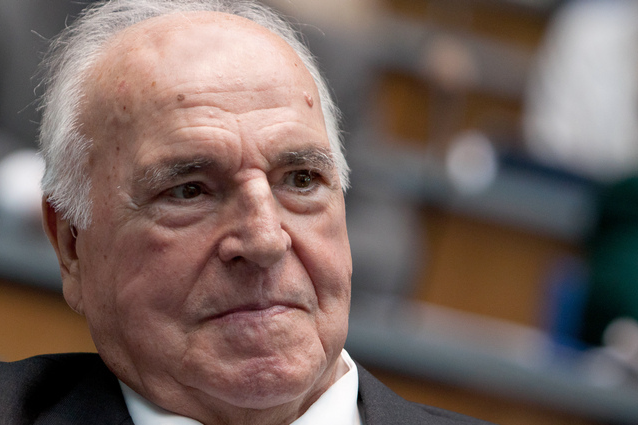
Kohl in 2012

In 2002, Kohl left the Bundestag and officially retired from politics. Later, he was largely rehabilitated by his party. After taking office, Angela Merkel invited her former patron to the Chancellor's Office and Ronald Pofalla, the Secretary-General of the CDU, announced that the CDU would cooperate more closely with Kohl, "to take advantage of the experience of this great statesman". On 4 March 2004, he published the first of his memoirs, called Memories 1930–1982, covering the period from 1930 to 1982, when he became chancellor. The second part, published on 3 November 2005, included the first half of his chancellorship (1982–1990). On 28 December 2004, he was air-lifted by the Sri Lanka Air Force, after having been stranded in a hotel by the 2004 Indian Ocean earthquake. Kohl was a member of the Club of Madrid.

As reported in the German press, he also gave his name to the Helmut Kohl Centre for European Studies (currently Centre for European Studies), which is the new political foundation of the European People's Party. In late February 2008, Kohl suffered a stroke in combination with a fall which caused serious head injuries and required his hospitalisation, after which he was reported to be using a wheelchair due to partial paralysis and having difficulty speaking. He remained in intensive care since, marrying his 43-year-old partner, Maike Richter, on 8 May 2008, while still in hospital. In 2010, he had a gall bladder operation in Heidelberg, and heart surgery in 2012. He was reportedly in "critical condition" in June 2015, following intestinal surgery following a hip-replacement procedure.

In 2011, Kohl, despite frail health, began giving a number of interviews and issued statements in which he sharply condemned his successor Angela Merkel, whom he had formerly mentored, on her policies in favour of strict austerity in the European debt crisis which he saw as opposed to his politics of peaceful bi-lateral European integration during his time as chancellor. He published the book Aus Sorge um Europa ("Out of Concern for Europe") outlining these criticisms of Merkel (while also attacking his immediate successor Gerhard Schröder's Euro policy) and was widely quoted in the press as saying, "Die macht mir mein Europa kaputt" ("That woman is destroying my Europe"). Kohl thus joined former German chancellors Gerhard Schröder and Helmut Schmidt in their similar criticisms of Merkel's policies in these two fields. In 2011, he also criticised Merkel for committing to nuclear power phaseout by 2022, following the Fukushima Daiichi nuclear disaster, saying that a nuclear phase-out would "make the world a more dangerous place", that risks are a part of life and Germany should instead focus on "taking precautionary measures and minimizing risks".

On 19 April 2016, Kohl was visited in his Oggersheim residence by Hungarian Prime Minister Viktor Orbán. The two had a one-hour conversation and released a joint press statement regarding the 2015 European migrant crisis, saying they doubted that Europe was capable of continuing to absorb refugees indefinitely. Before the meeting, it had widely been interpreted as criticism of Angela Merkel's handling of the crisis, but Kohl and Orbán refrained from attacking the chancellor directly, writing: "It is about a good future for Europe and peace in the world. The efforts of Merkel point in the same direction."

In 2016, Kohl sued Random House, his former ghost writer Heribert Schwan and co-author Tilman Jens for publishing without his consent 116 comments allegedly made by Kohl during interviews in 2001 and 2002 and published in an unauthorised biography in 2014 called Legacy: The Kohl Protocols. By April 2017, a German court ordered publisher Random House and the two journalists to pay Kohl damages of 1 million euros ($1.1 million) for violating his privacy, making it the highest judgment ever rendered for violations of privacy rights under German law.

== Political views ==
Kohl was committed to European integration, maintaining close relations with French president François Mitterrand. Parallel to this, he was committed to German reunification. Although he continued the Ostpolitik of his social democratic predecessors, Kohl supported Reagan's more aggressive policies to weaken the Soviet Union. He had a strained relationship with British prime minister and fellow conservative Margaret Thatcher, although Kohl did allow her secret access to his plans on reunification in March 1990, to allay the concerns she shared with Mitterrand.

== Personality and media portrayals ==
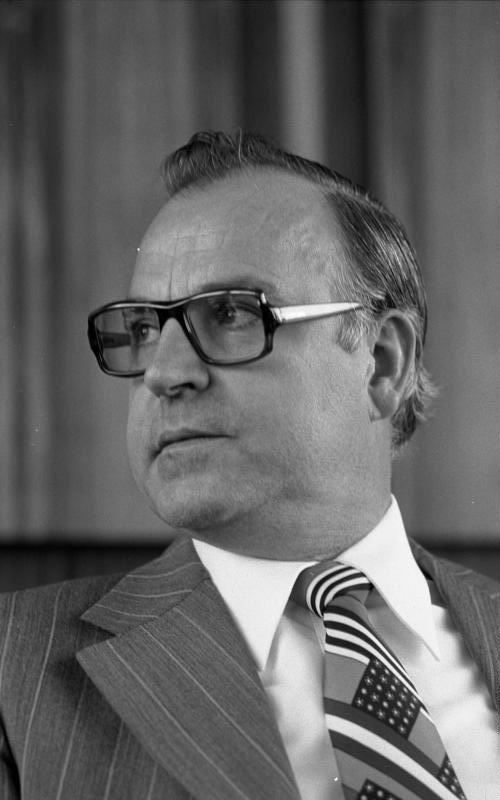
Kohl in 1975. In his years as minister-president, Kohl was treated by the media as a progressive reformer in his own party. This image changed during the 1970s with Kohl's assumption of leadership in the federal party.He experienced a fundamental animosity of journalists towards him.

Kohl faced stiff opposition from the West German political left and was mocked for his large physical stature (Standing at 193 cm (6 ft 4 in) and weighing over 136 kg (300 lb) during his leadership years), alleged provinciality, simplistic language, and (slight) local Palatinate dialect including hypercorrections. Similar to historical French cartoons of Louis-Philippe of France, Hans Traxler depicted Kohl as a pear in the left-leaning satirical journal Titanic. The German word "Birne" ("pear") became a widespread nickname for and symbol of the chancellor.

Comedians like Thomas Freitag and Stefan Wald imitated the chancellor, and books were sold with jokes rewritten with Kohl as the stupid protagonist. When Kohl died, left-wing newspaper Die Tageszeitung (TAZ) presented a title page showing a flower set typical for funerals, with a pear and the caption flourishing landscapes, Kohl's prediction for the future of East Germany after reunification. Following protests, the editor-in-chief apologised.

The minister-president of Rhineland-Palatinate (1969–1976) was a young reformer in a somewhat backward state and a newcomer who heavily criticised the older party leaders. The national media, for as much as they took notice of him, regarded him with curiosity. But this changed when Kohl became chair of the federal party in 1973, and even more dramatically when, in late 1975, his party made him a candidate for the chancellery. His opponents within the federal party, but also journalists and other observers, had their doubts whether the parochial, though successful, moderniser of a manageable, smaller state was the right person to lead the Federal Republic, a big and complicated industrial country.

Biographer Hans Peter Schwarz names five problems of the 46-year-old candidate: being unfamiliar with the complicated relations in the Bundestag group, having no international experience, having no profound knowledge of economics, but also: a lack of charisma and no cultural acceptance in Northern Germany.

In small circles, Kohl was fascinating and a perfect host; the larger the crowd, the vaguer, weaker and paler he appeared. His gaze into the TV cameras made him look helpless. When attacked, e.g. in election campaigns, he became a good fighter. But in general, he was no great orator; his speeches were lengthy and verbose, according to Schwarz. Additionally, the Catholic with his Palatinate dialect, a folksy man who had culture but was no intellectual – to North German journalists (like from the important newspapers made in Hamburg, including weeklies Der Spiegel and Die Zeit) he just felt foreign, more than any previous CDU chairman.

Unlike many politicians of his era, including predecessors Helmut Schmidt and Willy Brandt, successor Gerhard Schröder or rival Franz Josef Strauss, Kohl was never regarded as charismatic or media-savvy, and many of his peculiar coinings were heavily lampooned and criticised. Nonetheless, many of them have entered the general lexicon despite or perhaps because of attempts by his opponents to mock them. Examples of "Kohlisms" that have gained some currency include his description of the 1982 change in government as "geistig-moralische Wende " ("spiritual and moral turnaround") or the "Grace of late birth" ("Gnade der späten Geburt ") meaning that Kohl, born in 1930, was only involved in the war as a Flakhelfer and escaped the possibility of involvement in Nazi atrocities by virtue of being too young at the time. Another frequently mocked turn of phrase by Kohl was his prediction the New States of Germany would soon turn into "blühende Landschaften " ("flowering landscapes") with some cynics pointing out that former industrial sites were indeed turning into flowering meadows in the course of ecological succession as a consequence of deindustrialisation.

Kohl was a true "people person" and loved to be in the company of others. His tremendous memory of people and their lives helped him to build up his networks in the Christian Democratic Union, in government and abroad. In a study of German chancellorship as political leadership, Henrik Gast highlights how much time Kohl invested in personal relationships, even with the backbenchers in the Bundestag and also party officials up to the local level. This worked because it fitted Kohl's character and was authentic.

Kohl knew that all these people were the basis of his political power and that he needed their loyalty and personal affection. He could also be rude to subordinates and assistants and confront political adversaries. "He was capable of both – being empathetic and being extremely confrontational! If you did not do what he wanted, empathy was over!", as Gast quotes a federal minister of Kohl's own party. There was also a difference between the younger Kohl and the chancellor in his later years. A parliamentary state secretary recalled: "A sense of tact and politeness? The early and the later Kohl – that was a tremendous difference. In the early years, he had all of that, in the later years no more."

== Personal life ==
=== Family ===
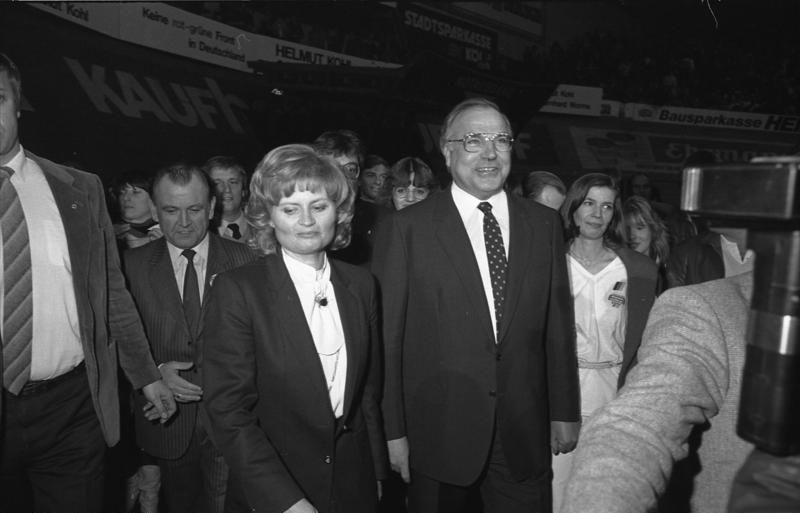
Kohl and his wife Hannelore in 1983

On 27 June 1960, Kohl married Hannelore Renner, after he had already asked for her hand in marriage in 1953, delaying the ceremony until he was financially stable. Both had known each other since 1948 when they met in a dancing class. They had two sons, Walter Kohl (born 1963) and Peter Kohl (born 1965). Hannelore Kohl had studied languages and spoke fluent French and English; during her husband's political career, she was an important adviser to him, especially on world affairs. She was a steadfast advocate of German reunification even before it seemed feasible and of NATO and Germany's alliance with the United States. They shared a love for German food: his commentary enhanced the cookbook A Culinary Voyage Through Germany that she edited.

Both sons were educated in the United States, at Harvard University and the MIT, respectively. Walter Kohl worked as a financial analyst with Morgan Stanley in New York City and later founded a consulting firm with his father in 1999. Peter Kohl worked as an investment banker in London for many years. Walter Kohl was formerly married to the business administration academic Christine Volkmann, and they have a son, Johannes Volkmann; he is now married to the Korean-born Kyung-Sook Kohl née Hwang. Peter Kohl is married to the Turkish-born investment banker Elif Sözen-Kohl, the daughter of a wealthy Turkish industrialist, and they have a daughter, Leyla Kohl (born 2002).

On 5 July 2001, his wife, Hannelore, died by suicide; she had suffered from photodermatitis for many years.

Family tree

Helmut Kohl	Hannelore Kohl
Christine Volkmann	Walter Kohl	Kyung-Sook Kohl	Peter Kohl	Elif Sözen-Kohl
Johannes Volkmann	Leyla Sözen-Kohl

=== Second marriage, 2008–2017 ===
While in hospital in 2008 after suffering serious head trauma, Kohl, then aged 78, married Maike Richter, a former Chancellery employee who was 44 years old; they had no children. For the entire duration of this marriage, Kohl had a brain injury, was barely able to speak, and used a wheelchair. According to Helmut Kohl's son Peter Kohl, Helmut Kohl did not intend to marry Richter and had stated this clearly; "then came the accident and a loss of control," Peter Kohl said, suggesting that Richter had pressured his then seriously ill father into marrying her. Richter has been severely criticised in Germany, by Kohl's children, former friends and by German media. Following his new marriage, Kohl became estranged from his two sons and his grandchildren, and his sons said their father was kept "like a prisoner" by his new wife. His children and grandchildren were also prevented from seeing him by his new wife for the last six years of his life. In his biography of his mother, Peter Kohl wrote about the only time he had visited Richter's apartment, which he described as "a kind of private Helmut Kohl museum" full of Helmut Kohl photographs and artefacts everywhere; "the whole thing looked like the result of a staggering, meticulous collecting for the purpose of hero worship, as we know it from reports on stalkers," Kohl wrote. Jochen Arntz criticised Maike Richter in the Süddeutsche Zeitung in 2012 for building a "wall" around Helmut Kohl and controlling him; as a result he had also become estranged from many former friends disliked by his new wife. Kohl biographer Heribert Schwan describes Richter as "more than conservative, rather German nationalist," and said she insists on the right to "interpretational sovereignty" in relation to Kohl's life and that she has insisted on many proven falsehoods. It caused a scandal when Richter denied Kohl's sons and grandchildren entry to Helmut Kohl's house, the sons' childhood home, after Kohl's death. Richter was also criticised for attempting to take full control of Kohl's funeral, and for trying to prevent Chancellor Merkel from speaking at the ceremony in Strasbourg. Richter wanted Hungarian Prime Minister Viktor Orbán, who has fiercely criticised Merkel's refugee policies, to speak instead; she only relented when told it would cause a scandal.

== Honours and awards ==
Helmut Kohl received numerous awards and accolades, as well as honorary titles such as a doctorate and citizenship. Among others, he was a joint recipient of the Charlemagne Prize with French president François Mitterrand for their contribution to Franco-German friendship and the European Union. In 1996, Kohl received the Prince of Asturias Award in International Cooperation from Felipe of Spain. In 1998, Kohl was named Honorary Citizen of Europe by the European heads of state or government for his extraordinary work for European integration and cooperation, an honour previously only bestowed on Jean Monnet. After leaving office in 1998, Kohl became the second person after Konrad Adenauer to receive the Grand Cross in Special Design of the Order of Merit of the Federal Republic of Germany. He received the Presidential Medal of Freedom from President Bill Clinton in 1999.

== Death, European act of state and funeral ==
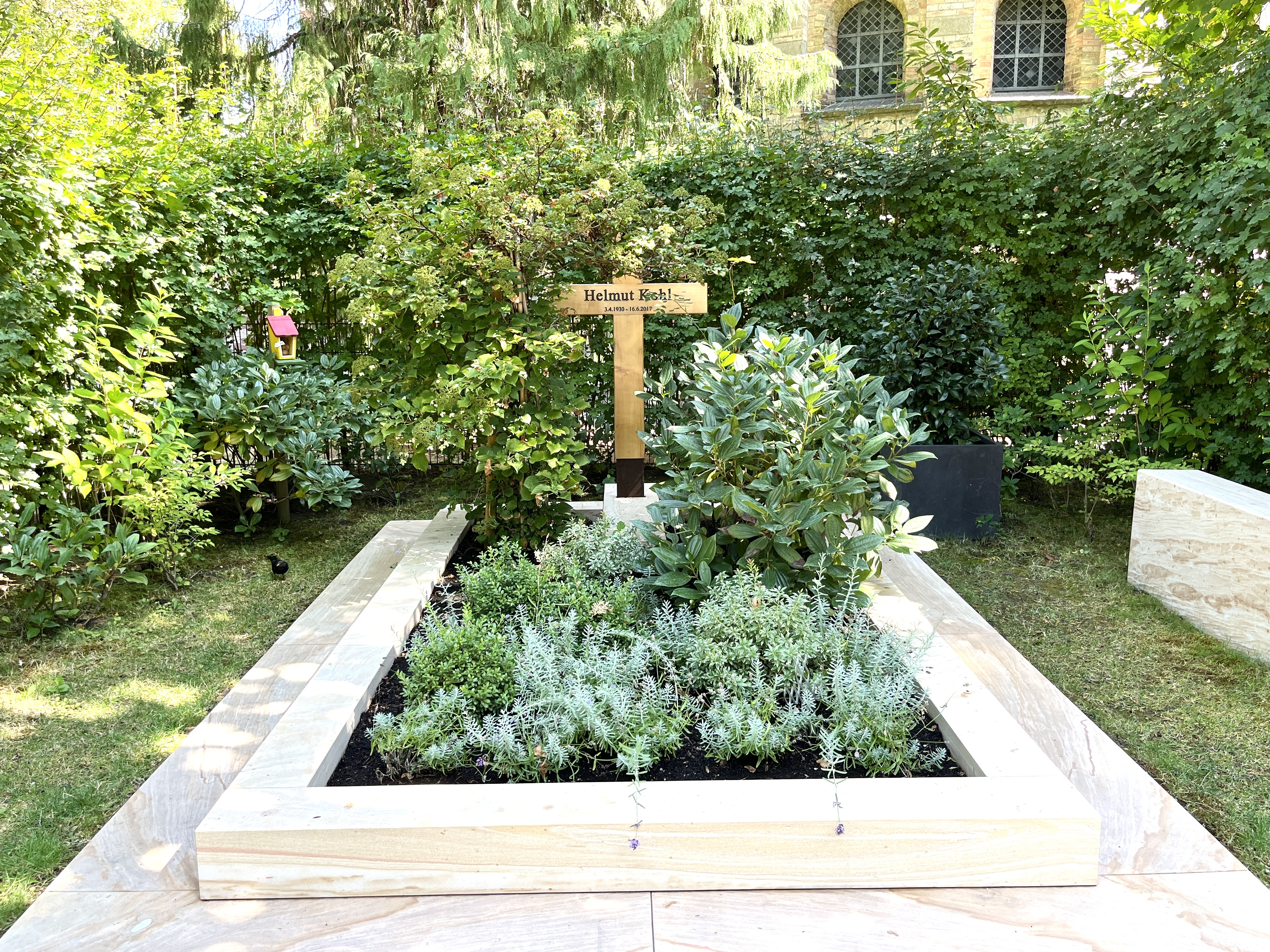
Grave of Kohl in Speyer, 2022

Kohl died at 9:15 a.m. on Friday, 16 June 2017, in the Oggersheim district of Ludwigshafen, his home town, aged 87, of natural causes.

Kohl was honoured with an unprecedented European act of state on 1 July in Strasbourg, France. A Catholic requiem mass was subsequently celebrated in Speyer Cathedral. Kohl was interred in the Cathedral Chapter Cemetery ("Domkapitelfriedhof") in Speyer, directly adjacent to the Konrad Adenauer Park and a few hundred metres to the northwest of the cathedral. It was reported that Kohl had himself chosen the burial location in the late summer of 2015 when his health began to deteriorate.

No member of the Kohl family — Kohl's children and grandchildren — participated in any of the ceremonies, owing to a feud with Kohl's controversial second wife Maike Kohl-Richter, who had among other things barred them from paying their respects to him at his house, ignored their wish for a ceremony in Berlin and their wish that Kohl should be interred alongside his parents and his wife of four decades Hannelore Kohl in the family tomb.

=== Tributes ===
Chancellor Angela Merkel, speaking from the German Embassy in Rome, said that "this man who was great in every sense of the word — his achievement, his role as a statesman in Germany at its historical moment — it's going to take a while until we can truly assess what we have lost in his passing." She lauded Kohl's "supreme art of statesmanship in the service of people and peace" and noted that Kohl had also changed her own life decisively.

Pope Francis lauded Kohl as "a great statesman and committed European [who] worked with farsightedness and devotion for the good of the people in Germany and in neighbouring European countries."

The 14th Dalai Lama praised Kohl as "a visionary leader and statesman" and said he had "great admiration for Chancellor Kohl's steady leadership when the Cold War came to a peaceful end, and the reunification of Germany became possible."

Flags were flown at half-staff at the European Commission headquarters in Brussels. Commission president Jean-Claude Juncker lauded Kohl as "a great European." He called Kohl "my mentor, my friend, the very essence of Europe." The President of the European Council, Donald Tusk, called Kohl "a friend and a statesman, who helped to reunify Europe."

Former US president George H. W. Bush lauded Kohl as "a true friend of freedom" and "one of the greatest leaders in post-War Europe." Former US president Bill Clinton said he was "deeply saddened" by the death of "my dear friend" whose "visionary leadership prepared Germany and all of Europe for the 21st century". US president Donald Trump said Kohl was "a friend and ally to the United States" and that "he was not only the father of German reunification, but also an advocate for Europe and the transatlantic relationship. The world has benefited from his vision and efforts. His legacy will live on." Former US secretary of state James Baker said Kohl's death meant "Germany has lost one of its greatest leaders, the United States has lost one of its best friends and the world has lost a ringing voice for freedom," and that Kohl "more than anyone at the end of the Cold War [...] was the architect of the reunification of Germany" which had "brought freedom to millions and has helped make Europe safer and more prosperous."

French president Emmanuel Macron called Kohl a "great European" and "an architect of united Germany and Franco-German friendship." Belgian Prime Minister Charles Michel called Kohl "a true European" who "will be greatly missed." Dutch prime minister Mark Rutte said Kohl was "a great statesman" who had shaped European history. Spanish prime minister Mariano Rajoy lauded Kohl's role in European history and in the German reunification. Polish prime minister Beata Szydło called Kohl "an outstanding figure and statesman, a great politician in exceptional times". Italian president Sergio Mattarella called Kohl one of Europe's founding fathers, and said that "he who was, rightly, described as 'the Chancellor of Reunification', worked with far-sightedness and determination, in years marked by deep and epochal changes in world equilibria, to give back unity to his country in the framework of the great project of European integration. As an authentic statesman, he knew how to combine pragmatism and a capacity of vision, furnishing a courageous contribution not only to the fall of the Berlin Wall and the reunification of Germany, but also to overcoming the dramatic divisions which, for decades, had torn Europe." Former Italian prime minister and President of the European Commission Romano Prodi called Kohl "a giant of a united Europe." Hungarian prime minister Viktor Orbán called Kohl the "great old man" of European politics and "Hungary's friend".

Former British prime minister John Major said Kohl was "a towering figure in German and European history" who "entrenched Germany in a wider Europe, in the hope of achieving a unity and peace that the continent had never known before. This required great political strength and courage – both of which qualities Helmut had in abundance." British prime minister Theresa May called Kohl "a giant of European history" and said that "I pay tribute to the role he played in helping to end the Cold War and reunify Germany. We have lost the father of modern Germany."

Former Soviet president Mikhail Gorbachev said that "it was real luck that at that difficult time [1989–1990] leading nations were headed by statesmen with a sense of responsibility, adamant about defending the interests of their countries but also able to consider the interests of others, able to overcome the barrier of prevailing suspicion about partnership and mutual trust. The name of this outstanding German politician will stay in the memory of his compatriots and all Europeans." Russian president Vladimir Putin said, "I was lucky to know Helmut Kohl in person. I profoundly admired his wisdom and the ability to make well-considered, far-reaching decisions even in the most difficult situations." He called Kohl a "highly reputed statesman, one of the patriarchs of European and world politics."

NATO Secretary-General Jens Stoltenberg said Kohl was "a true European" and the "embodiment of a united Germany in a united Europe." UN Secretary-General António Guterres said Kohl had "played an instrumental role in the peaceful reunification of his country" and that "today's Europe is a product of his vision and his tenacity, in the face of enormous obstacles."

== Bibliography ==
- Köhler, Henning (2014). Helmut Kohl. Ein Leben für die Politik (in German). Cologne: Quadriga Verlag. ISBN 978-3-86995-076-1..
- Schwarz, Hans-Peter (2012). Helmut Kohl. Eine politische Biographie (in German). Munich: Deutsche Verlags-Anstalt. ISBN 978-3-421-04458-7..

Political offices
Preceded by Peter Altmeier	Minister President of Rhineland-Palatinate; 1969–1976	Succeeded by Bernhard Vogel
Preceded by Helmut Schmidt	Chancellor of West Germany; 1982–1990	Germany reunifies
Recreated Germany reunified	Chancellor of Germany; 1990–1998	Succeeded by Gerhard Schröder
Party political offices
Preceded by Rainer Barzel	Leader of the Christian Democratic Union; 1973–1998	Succeeded by Wolfgang Schäuble
Preceded by Karl Carstens	Chair of the CDU/CSU Parliamentary Group; 1976–1982	Succeeded by Alfred Dregger
Diplomatic posts
Preceded by Margaret Thatcher	Chair of the Group of 7; 1985	Succeeded by Yasuhiro Nakasone
Preceded by John Major	Chair of the Group of 7; 1992	Succeeded by Kiichi Miyazawa
