= Peter Kohl =

German businessman and author (born 1965)

- Born: 28 August 1965 (age 61); Ludwigshafen, Rhineland-Palatinate, West Germany
- Occupations: Businessman, entrepreneur and author
- Spouse: Elif Sözen-Kohl
- Children: Leyla Sözen-Kohl
- Parents: Helmut Kohl (father); Hannelore Kohl (mother)

Peter Kohl (born 28 August 1965) is a German businessman and author, who resides in Switzerland. He is the younger son of former German Chancellor Helmut Kohl and Hannelore Kohl, and brother of Walter Kohl.

He grew up at the family home in Ludwigshafen-Oggersheim. Kohl attended the Waldorf school in Ludwigshafen and the Liselotte – Gymnasium (secondary school) across the river in Mannheim. He was also schooled in the UK and at the Jesuit Lycée la Providence in Amiens, France. He is a reserve officer and served for two years in the Paratrooper Battalion 263 (Bundeswehr), now Paratrooper Regiment 26. He holds a B.S. in economics from Massachusetts Institute of Technology (MIT) and a master’s degree in economics from the University of Vienna.

After working for 8 years as an investment banker at Credit Suisse London, and in corporate finance and capital markets at Salomon Brothers, he co-founded an independent corporate finance advisory and fund management firm. While taking a one year sabbatical in 2003, he studied Biotechnology whilst reading for a Master of Bioscience Enterprise programme at the University of Cambridge. While at Cambridge, he co-founded, grew and later successfully exited a biotech company. He has lived in London for 17 years.

His interests include new start-up ventures, technology and fixed income opportunities and has run equity and fund-of-hedge funds. He is an aviation enthusiast and has been a PPL, multi-engine, IFR-rated pilot.

In May 2001, he married his long-time girlfriend, the Turkish-born banker Elif Sözen, whom he had met in Boston whilst both were undergraduates at MIT. She is the daughter of an industrialist from Istanbul, Dr. Kemal Sözen, the head of the metal company Kale Kalip Makina Sanayii. Kohl’s wife formerly worked with Goldman Sachs and JP Morgan in London. At the time of their marriage, they had already lived together for over ten years, eight of them in London, most recently in Chelsea. She speaks six languages including German. Reflecting the multicultural nature of the event, the celebration in Istanbul lasted three days and three marriage ceremonies were involved: a Roman Catholic marriage, a Muslim marriage and a (Turkish) civil marriage. Noting Chancellor Kohl's opposition to admitting Turkey to the European Union, an English newspaper asserted excitedly that "the marriage of Peter Kohl and Elif Sözen ... [had] the potential to transform German attitudes towards race".

They have a daughter, Leyla, born in 2002. It was reported in 2009 that Leyla had spent time in Turkey to learn Turkish. After the death of Helmut Kohl, Leyla Sözen-Kohl visited her grandfather's house in Ludwigshafen together with her uncle Walter Kohl and cousin Johannes Volkmann, but were denied entry to the house by Helmut Kohl's second wife Maike Kohl-Richter.

In 2002 he published a biography of his late mother, co-written with Dona Kujacinski, which received much media attention after her suicide in 2001.

== Bibliography ==
- Hannelore Kohl. Droemer, München 2002; second ed.: Knaur, München 2013, ISBN 978-3-426-78557-7.
