= State occasion =

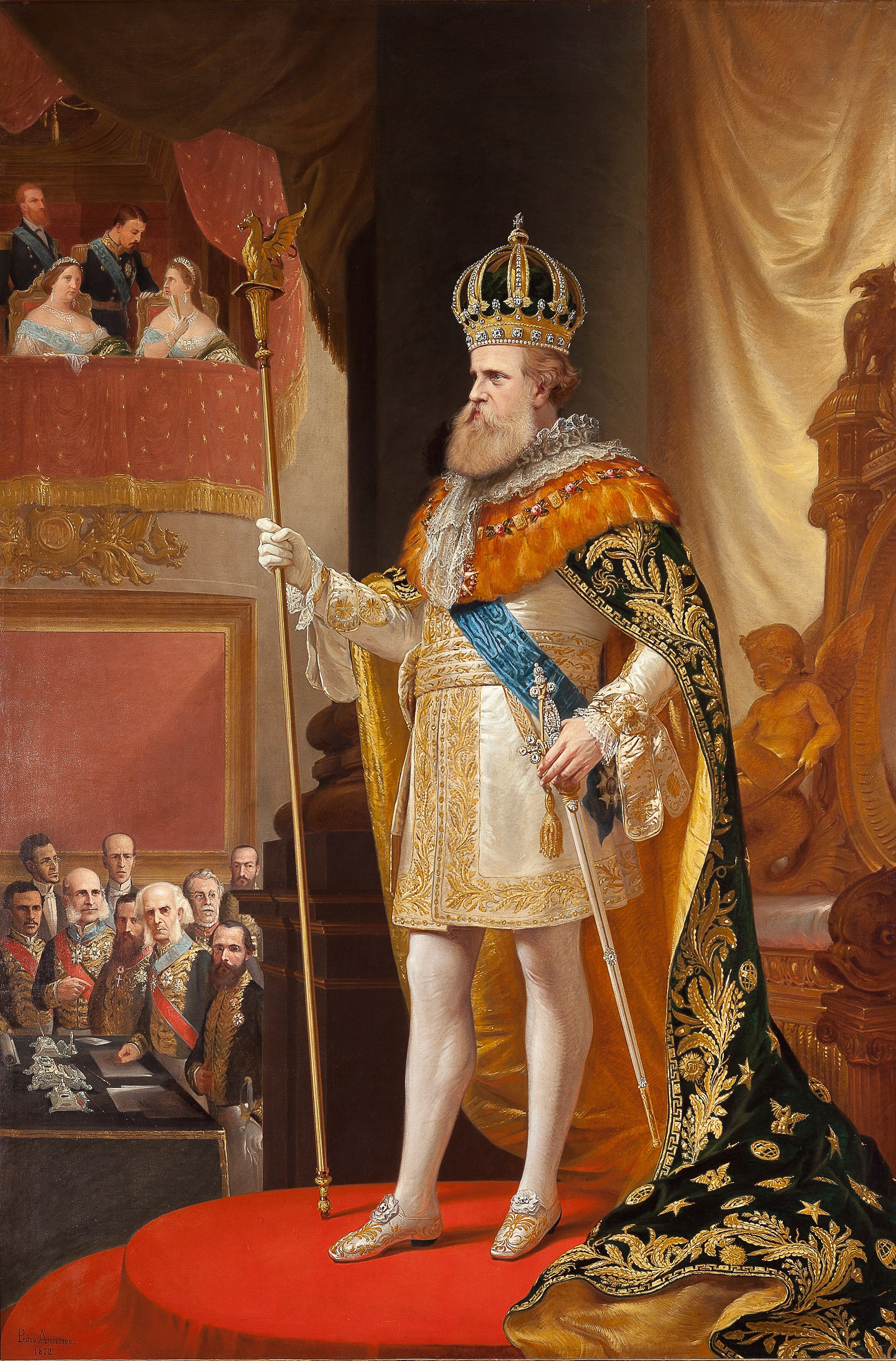
Emperor Pedro II of Brazil at the opening ceremony of the General Assembly, with members of the imperial family and government in attendance. Painting by Pedro Américo, 1872

A state occasion or act of state is an official state ceremony usually marking an important event or honouring a person. Characteristics of a state occasion are a grand ceremony, a representative framework and the presence of high state officials, such as heads of state and government.

When honouring a deceased person it typically takes the form of a state funeral, although it can also be a separate ceremony which takes place before or after the actual funeral. Acts of state honouring deceased persons, but which are not actual funerals themselves, are found in a number of European countries and at the European Union level.

== Germany ==
In Germany, only the President of Germany has the authority to authorise an act of state at the federal level. Acts of State are typically held for former Presidents, Chancellors, Presidents of the Bundestag and sometimes for Presidents of the Federal Constitutional Court and members of the federal cabinet.

== European Union ==
In 2017 the President of the European Commission Jean-Claude Juncker announced the first ever European Act of State in honour of Helmut Kohl, to take place in Strasbourg.
