= Hannelore Kohl =

Wife of Helmut Kohl (1933-2001)

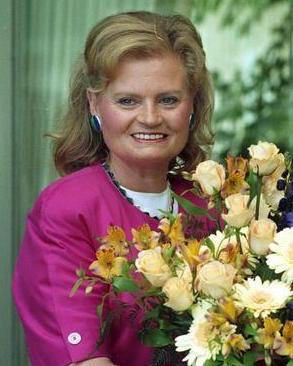
Hannelore Kohl in 1991

Johanna Klara Eleonore "Hannelore" Kohl (née Renner; 7 March 1933 – 5 July 2001) was the first wife of German Chancellor Helmut Kohl. She met him for the first time at a school party in Ludwigshafen, Allied-occupied Germany in 1948, when she was 15 years old, and they became engaged in 1953. They were married from 1960 until her death in 2001, a span which included his entire political career. They were the parents of Walter Kohl and Peter Kohl.

As the first lady of Rhineland-Palatinate (1969–1976) and later as the wife of the Chancellor (1982–1998) she undertook official duties, and was engaged in philanthropic work. According to their sons she was an important adviser for her husband during his chancellorship, especially concerning the German reunification and in international relations. Her fluency in foreign languages aided her husband in personal diplomacy.

== Life and work ==
Johanna Klara Eleonore Renner was born and christened in Berlin. Her father Wilhelm Renner who joined the Nazi Party (NSDAP) in 1933, became an engineer, business executive, Wehrwirtschaftsführer at Hugo Schneider AG and also headed the employment office that developed the anti-tank weapon Panzerfaust. Later, she chose Hannelore to be used as her first name.

In the days following Germany's defeat in World War II, at the age of 12, Hannelore Kohl was one of the girls battered and defiled by Stalin's soldiers, multiple times raped by multiple Soviet soldiers and then thrown out of a window. In addition to psychological trauma, the attacks left her with a fractured vertebra and back pain for the rest of her life. In order to help others with similar injuries, in 1983 she founded the Kuratorium ZNS, a foundation that helps those with trauma-induced injuries to the central nervous system, and became its president.

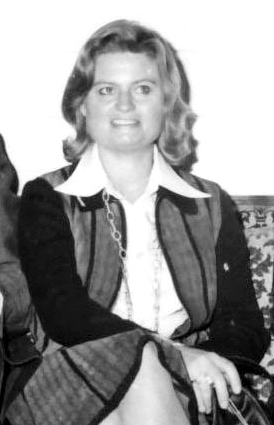
Hannelore Kohl in 1976

Hannelore Kohl had trained as an interpreter of English and French, which she spoke fluently. She had to end her studies in 1952, when her father died, and worked for some years as a foreign-language secretary. She later utilized her fluency in English and French in personal diplomacy alongside her husband, who spoke no foreign languages.

On 5 July 2001, Kohl was found dead at age 68 in her Ludwigshafen home. She had apparently died by suicide with an overdose of sleeping pills, after years of suffering from what she had claimed to be a very rare and painful photoallergy induced by an earlier penicillin treatment that had forced her to avoid practically all sunlight for years. Hannelore's biographer, Heribert Schwan, cited "medical experts to support his theory that the bizarre light allergy of her later years may have been a psychosomatic reaction to the suppressed traumas of the war." In 2005, the Kuratorium ZNS was renamed ZNS – Hannelore Kohl Stiftung in her honor.

Kohl's collection of German-style cooking recipes, Kulinarische Reise durch Deutsche Länder (Culinary Journey through German Regions), was published in 1996.

== Honours ==
- Bambi Award, 1985
- USO International Service Award of the United Service Organizations, 1987
- Order of Merit of Rhineland-Palatinate, 1988
- honorary doctorate, University of Greifswald, 1995
- Knight Commander of the Order of Merit of the Federal Republic of Germany, 1999

== Publications ==
=== Edited by ===
- A Culinary Tour of Germany, Munich: Zabert Sandmann, 1996, ISBN 3-924678-87-1
