= Walter Kohl =

German entrepreneur, son of Helmut Kohl

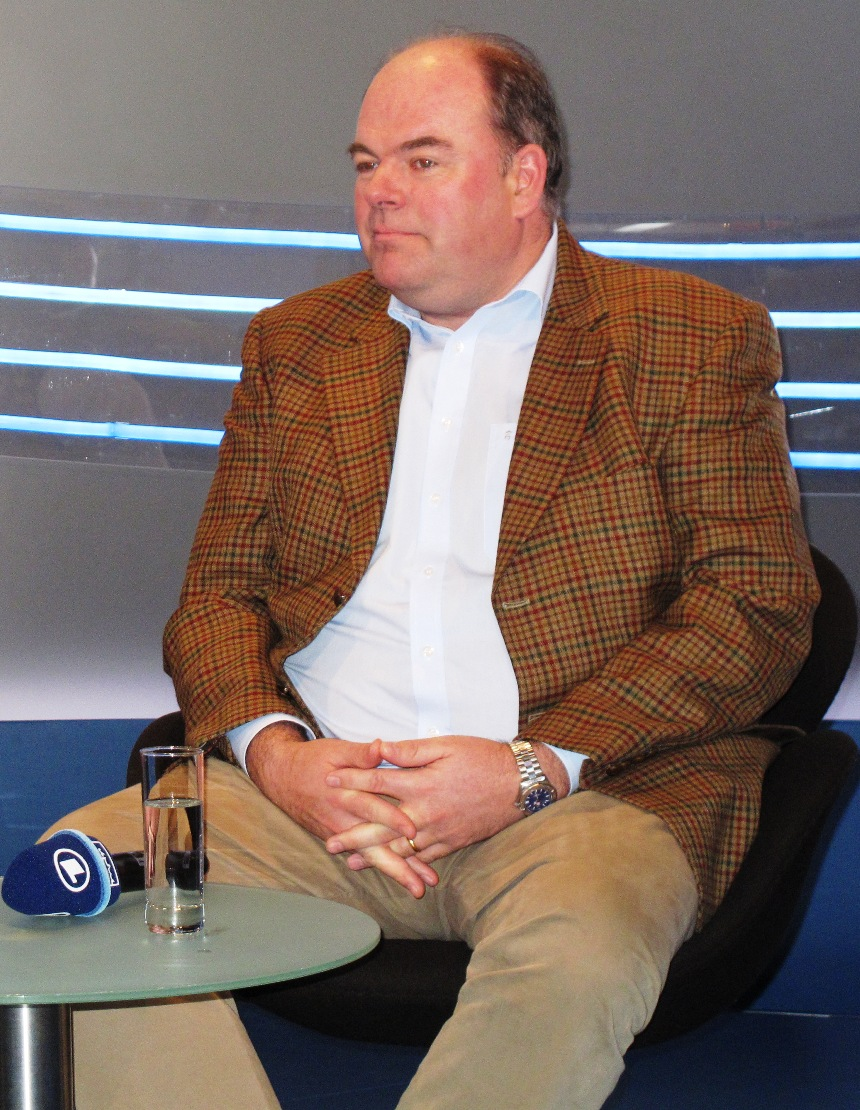
Walter Kohl at the Leipzig Book Fair, 2011

Walter Kohl (born 16 July 1963) is a German financial analyst, businessman and author. He is the elder of the two sons of the former German Chancellor Helmut Kohl and Hannelore Kohl, and the brother of Peter Kohl.

Walter Kohl was formerly married to Professor Christine Volkmann, the UNESCO Chair for Entrepreneurship and Intercultural Management. They have a son, Johannes Volkmann, who is active in politics for the CDU. Walter Kohl is married in his second marriage to the Korean-born Kyung-Sook Kohl (née Hwang).

After his military service, he attended college at Harvard University from 1985 to 1989. He graduated with a Bachelor of Arts and majored in economics and history. In 1990 he obtained a master's degree in economics at the University of Vienna. He subsequently worked as a financial analyst focusing on the oil and gas industry and capital markets at Morgan Stanley's New York City office. In 1993, he obtained an MBA at INSEAD in France. He returned to Germany in 1994. In 1999, he founded a consulting firm with his father Helmut Kohl. The cooperation ended in 2005, when he founded a company with his second wife, Kohl & Hwang.

In 2011 he published the book Leben oder gelebt werden about his family, which received much media attention and became a bestseller in Germany. His second book Leben was du fühlst was published in 2013. In 2019 he joined the Christian Democratic Union of Germany and published his first political book in February 2020.

== Bibliography ==
- Leben oder gelebt werden: Schritte auf dem Weg zur Versöhnung. Integral Verlag, München 2011, ISBN 978-3-7787-9204-9.
- Leben was du fühlst. Von der Freiheit, glücklich zu sein. Der Weg der Versöhnung. Scorpio, Berlin/München 2013, ISBN 978-3-943416-00-8.
- with Anselm Grün: Was uns wirklich trägt. Über gelingendes Leben. Herder, Freiburg im Breisgau 2014, ISBN 978-3-451-33292-0.
- Welche Zukunft wollen wir? Mein Plädoyer für eine Politik von Morgen. Herder, Freiburg im Breisgau 2020, ISBN 978-3-451-38463-9.
