= Zeppelin (disambiguation) =

Zeppelin is a type of rigid airship.

Zeppelin may also refer to:

== Arts and entertainment ==
- Zeppelin (film), a 1971 British film
- Zeppelin (video game), a 1994 flight and economic simulation game
- Zeppelin (1983 video game), a shoot 'em up game
- The Zeppelin, a 1933 painting by Carel Willink
- Led Zeppelin, a British rock band
- The Zeppelin Record, a 1998 album by Dogbowl
- "Zeppelin", a 2015 song by Sam and the Womp

== Businesses and organisations ==
- Zeppelin Foundation, a philanthropic organisation
- Luftschiffbau Zeppelin ('building of airships'), a German airship manufacturer
- Zeppelin-Staaken, a former German aircraft manufacturer
- Zeppelin Games, former name of Eutechnyx, a British video game developer

== People ==
- Count Ferdinand von Zeppelin (1838–1917), German officer, inventor of the Zeppelin rigid airship
- Zeppelin (surname), including a list of people with that name

== Places ==
- Zeppelin (bunker), World War II bunker near Zossen, Germany
- Zeppelin (research station), Svalbard, Norway
- Zeppelin (shopping centre), shopping mall in Kempele, Finland
- Zeppelin Field, Nazi Party rally grounds in Nuremberg, Germany
- Zeppelin University, a university at Friedrichshafen, Germany
- Zeppelinhamna ('Zeppelin Cove'), Spitsbergen island, Svalbard, Norway
- Zeppelinfjellet, ('Zeppelin Mountain'), Spitsbergen island, Svalbard, Norway
- Mount Zeppelin, an Antarctic mountain

== Transportation ==
- Zeppelin NT, a modern class of helium-filled airships
- USS Zeppelin (1914), a passenger liner launched in 1914 as SS Zeppelin
- Maybach Zeppelin, a luxury car 1928–34
- Rail zeppelin, experimental railcar which resembled a zeppelin airship in appearance

== Other uses ==
- Zeppelin (iPod speaker system), a Bowers & Wilkins product
- Zeppelin (typeface), from the Klingspor Type Foundry
- Zeppelin bend, a general purpose bend knot
  - Zeppelin loop, a loop knot
- Zeppelin mail, airmail carried on Zeppelins
- Zeppelin or Zep, also known as submarine sandwich#Other names
- Cepelinai ('zeppelins'), a traditional Lithuanian dish of stuffed potato dumplings

== See also ==
- Graf Zeppelin (disambiguation)
- Operation Zeppelin (disambiguation)
- Zeppelin Museum (disambiguation)
- Zepelin, a municipality in Rostock district, Mecklenburg-Vorpommern, Germany
- ZEPLIN-III, a dark matter experiment
