= Johannes Volkmann =

German politician (born 1996)

Johannes Volkmann MdB
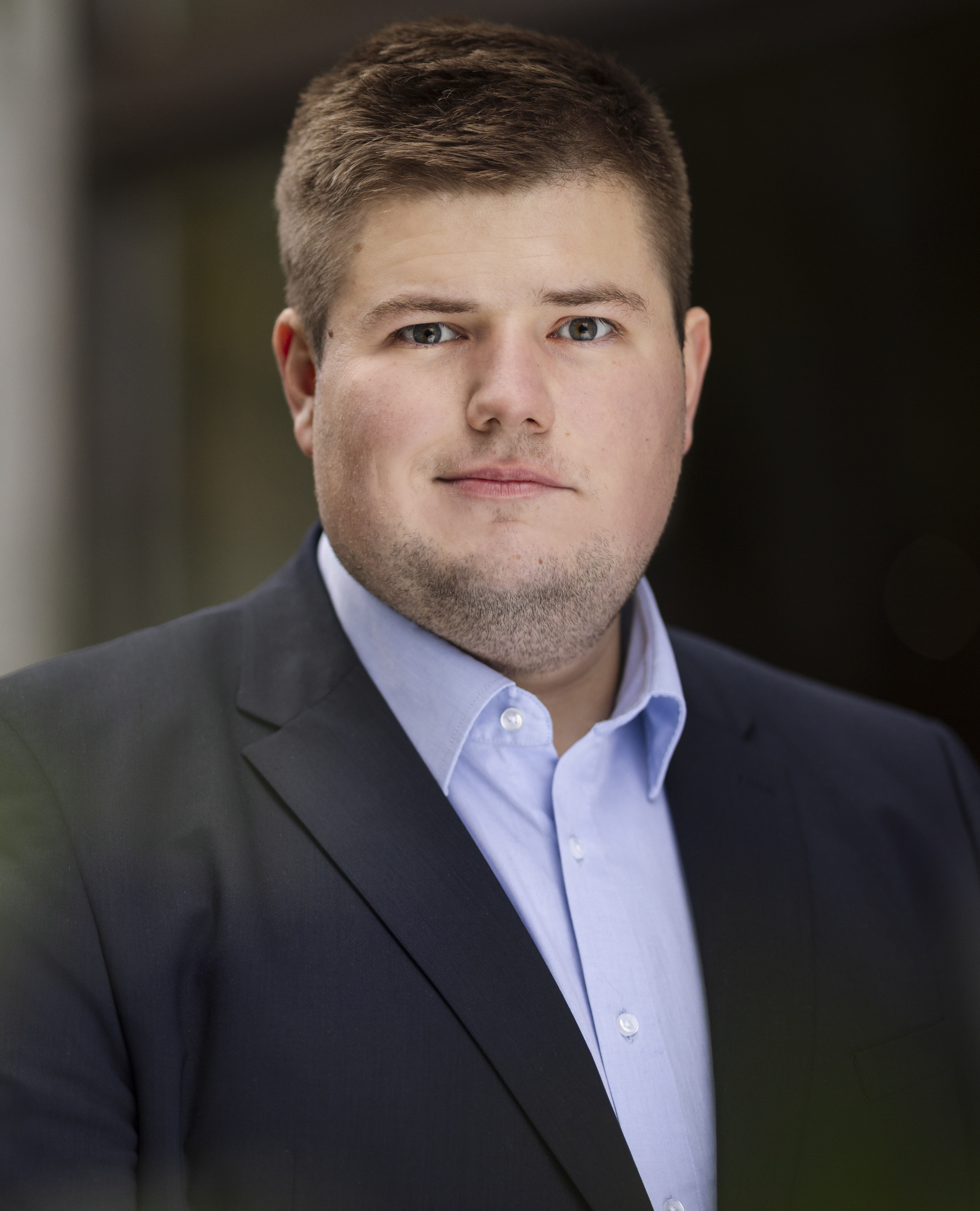
- Volkmann in 2024

Member of the Bundestag; for Lahn-Dill
- Incumbent
- Assumed office 25 March 2025
- Preceded by: Dagmar Schmidt

Personal details
- Born: Johannes Benedikt Volkmann; 11 December 1996 (age 29) Cologne, Germany
- Party: Christian Democratic Union
- Parent(s): Walter Kohl; Christine Volkmann
- Relatives: Helmut Kohl (grandfather); Hannelore Kohl (grandmother); Peter Kohl (uncle)
- Education: Zeppelin University (B.A.); University of Oxford, St Antony's College (M.Sc.)
- Profession: Economist, Sinologist
- Website: www.johannes-volkmann.de

Johannes Benedikt Volkmann (born 11 December 1996) is a German politician of the Christian Democratic Union (CDU). Since 2025, he has been a Member of the German Bundestag.

== Early life, education and career ==
Volkmann was born in Cologne and raised in Lahnau. He is the son of Walter Kohl and academic Christine Volkmann. His grandfather is the former Chancellor Helmut Kohl. After graduating from the Landgraf-Ludwigs-Gymnasium in Gießen in 2014, he studied sociology, Politics and Economics at Zeppelin University in Friedrichshafen. During his bachelor's he spent one semester at Tongji University Shanghai and one at Peking University. He received a scholarship from the Evangelisches Studienwerk and studied in courses abroad at Belarusian State University in Minsk and Irkutsk National Research Technical University with the German Academic Exchange Service. In 2020 he graduated with a master's degree in Contemporary Chinese Studies from the University of Oxford (St Antony's College).

From 2020 to 2025 he served as the Chief of Staff to the Member of the European Parliament Sven Simon, serving as Chair of the Committee on Constitutional Affairs in Brussels. During this time he worked on a revision of the Lisbon Treaty, a revised European electoral law and the EU-Mercosur Association Agreement.

Volkmann is a practicing Lutheran. He lives in Lahnau.

== Political career ==
Volkmann joined the youth-wing of the CDU, the Junge Union in 2010 and the party in 2012. He held several offices in the student- and youth-wings of the party.

In 2021 he was elected to the County Council of Lahn-Dill County in Germany through preferential voting and was elected Chairman of the council, at that time being the youngest head of a local government assembly in Germany. In his position he initiated municipal aid deliveries to Ukraine, a partnership agreement with the city of Brovary and solidarity marches with Ukraine following the Russian invasion of the country.

Volkmann was a closed list candidate for the CDU at the 2019 European Parliament election and the 2021 German federal election.

In 2022 Volkmann was elected to the State board of the CDU Hessen. In 2024 he became the youngest elected member of the National board of the CDU.

In the 2025 German federal election Volkmann was elected in the Lahn-Dill constituency with 34,4%.
