= Zeppelin (surname) =

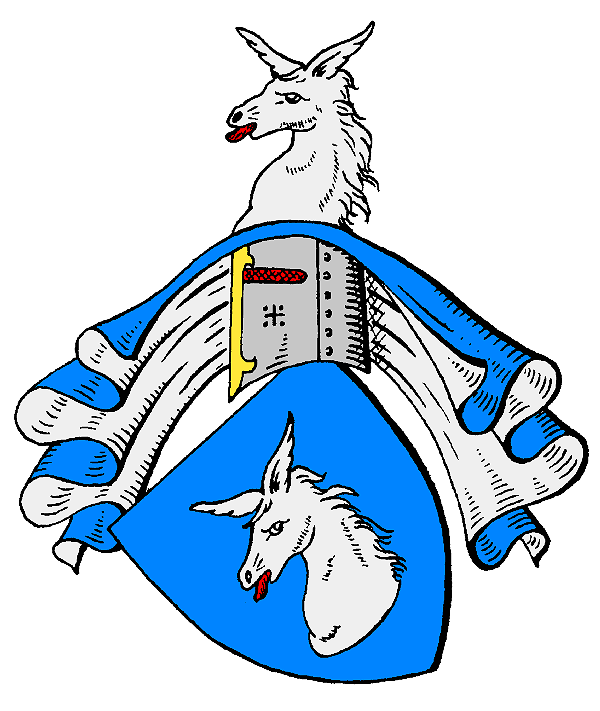

Origin
- Origin: German
- Region of origin: Germany

Other names
- Variant forms: Zepelin, Zeppelin (without von)

The surname Zeppelin first appeared in a German document dated September 1286, indicating an origin in the town of Zepelin, which is now a municipality in the district of Rostock, in Mecklenburg-Vorpommern, Germany.

In the Middle Ages, to be called von Zeppelin could mean simply "from Zeppelin". However, in later centuries the word "von" was added only as a nobiliary particle, indicating an ancestor who had been ennobled.

Zeppelin, originally a Slavic village spelled Cepelin [tsepelin], is named after the Cep, an ancient Slavic agricultural tool

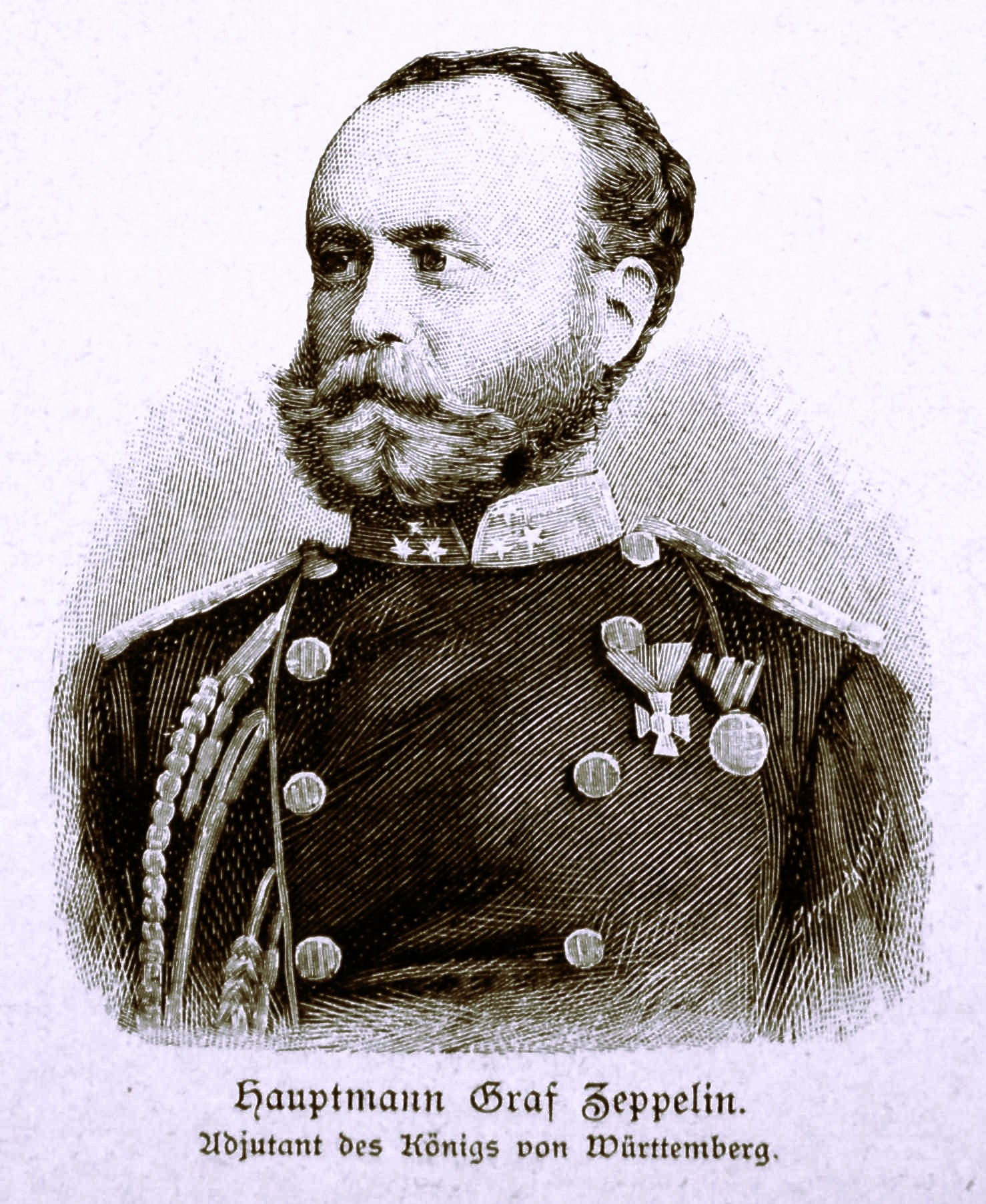
Hauptmann Graf Zeppelin

== People ==
=== Germany ===
- Ferdinand von Zeppelin (1838–1917), a German general and later aircraft manufacturer, who founded the Zeppelin airship company.
- Eberhard von Zeppelin (1842-1906), was a German Historian and brother of Ferdinand von Zeppelin
- Ferdinand Ludwig von Zeppelin, was a German diplomat and politician
- Friedrich von Zeppelin, was a German court official
- Karl von Zeppelin, was a German diplomat and head of state

== See also ==
- Zeppelin (noble family)
- Zeppelin (disambiguation)
- Graf Zeppelin (disambiguation) (German: Count Zeppelin)
