= Hans-Jürgen Irmer =

German politician (born 1952)

- Irmer in 2016

Member of the Bundestag; for Lahn-Dill
- In office 24 October 2017 – 26 October 2021
- Preceded by: Sibylle Pfeiffer
- Succeeded by: Dagmar Schmidt

Member of the Landtag of Hesse
- In office 26 October 1998 – 31 October 2017
- Preceded by: Gerald Weiß
- Succeeded by: Frank Steinraths
- Constituency: State list (1998–1999); Lahn-Dill II (1999–2008); State list (2008–2009); Lahn-Dill II (2009–2017)
- In office 5 July 1993 – 5 April 1995
- Preceded by: Dietrich Möller
- Succeeded by: Multi-member district
- Constituency: State list
- In office 20 November 1990 – 5 April 1991
- Preceded by: Hans-Joachim Jentsch
- Succeeded by: Multi-member district
- Constituency: State list

Personal details
- Born: 20 February 1952 (age 74) Limburg an der Lahn, West Germany
- Party: Christian Democratic Union
- Children: 2
- Education: University of Giessen

Hans-Jürgen Irmer (born 20 February 1952) is a German politician of the Christian Democratic Union (CDU) who served as a member of the Bundestag from the state of Hesse from 2017 until 2021.

== Political career ==
Irmer became a member of the Bundestag in the 2017 German federal election. In parliament, he was a member of the Committee on Internal Affairs.
