= Graf Zeppelin =

Graf Zeppelin (German: Count Zeppelin) may refer to:

== People ==
- Count Ferdinand Adolf Heinrich August Graf von Zeppelin (1838–1917), German officer, engineer, and founder of the Zeppelin airship company
- Counts of Zeppelin (Grafen von Zeppelin)
- Eberhard Moritz Adolph Albert Graf von Zeppelin (1842–1906), Count of Zeppelin
- Amethé Gwendolen Marion Mackenzie Smeaton Gräfin von Zeppelin (born 1896), Countess of Zeppelin

== Transportation and vehicles ==
- LZ 127 Graf Zeppelin, a German rigid airship 1928–1937, named after Count Zeppelin
- LZ 130 Graf Zeppelin II, the second airship of the Hindenburg class, 1938–1940, named after Count Zeppelin
- Graf Zeppelin-class aircraft carriers, two German Kriegsmarine aircraft carriers laid down in the mid-1930s, named after Count Zeppelin
  - German aircraft carrier Graf Zeppelin, the first ship of this class

== Other uses ==
- Naval Air Wing 3 "Graf Zeppelin"
- Graf Zeppelin Barracks, Calw, Germany
- Graf Zeppelin (march), a musical composition by Carl Teike

== See also ==
- Zeppelin (disambiguation)
- 1930 Graf Zeppelin stamps
- Zeppelin (surname)
