= Christine Volkmann =

German economist (born 1960)

- Born: Christine Katharina Volkmann; 1960 (age 65–66); Giessen, Germany
- Spouse: Walter Kohl
- Children: Johannes Volkmann
- Relatives: Helmut Kohl (father-in-law)

Academic background
- Education: University of Giessen

Academic work
- Discipline: Entrepreneurship
- Institutions: University of Wuppertal
- Awards: UNESCO Chair in Entrepreneurship and Intercultural Management; Teaching Award (Lehrlöwe) at the University of Wuppertal 2018

Christine Katharina Volkmann (born 1960) is a German economist and holds the UNESCO Chair in Entrepreneurship and Intercultural Management at the Schumpeter School of Business and Economics of the University of Wuppertal.

== Career ==
From 1981 to 1986 Christine Volkmann studied Business Administration at the University of Giessen, where she also worked as an assistant to the German economist Dietger Hahn. She earned her doctorate in strategic business planning in 1989, while working as a research assistant at Lufthansa on the privatisation of the aviation market in Europe. Afterwards, she joined Deutsche Bank and held several leadership positions until 1999. In 1999 she became a professor at the Westphalian University of Applied Sciences in Gelsenkirchen and is a UNESCO Chairholder for Entrepreneurship and Intercultural Management since 2005. In 2008 she received a call to the Schumpeter School of Business and Economics at the University of Wuppertal. Christine Volkmann is a director of the German Institute for Entrepreneurship and Innovations Research (IGIF) and co-founded the foundation of the interdisciplinary Jackstädt Research Center for Entrepreneurship funded by the Jackstädt Foundation. Moreover, since 2005 she is a visiting professor at the Bucharest Academy of Economic Studies, where she teaches graduate courses in leadership and innovation management and in 2015 at the University of Graz. Moreover, she served as an advisor to the European Commission, the president of the European Economic and Social Committee as well as the World Economic Forum in Davos and the European Foundation for Entrepreneurship Research (EFER) alongside Bert Twaalfhoven. In 2018 she became a member of the State Council on the Digitization of the Economy of the government of North Rhine-Westphalia. Since 2015 she serves as a member of the selection committee of the German Entrepreneur of the Year.

== Personal life ==
She was formerly married to Walter Kohl and was the daughter-in-law of former German Chancellor Helmut Kohl; they have a son, Johannes Volkmann.
