= Zeppelin GmbH =

German holding company

- Type: GmbH
- Industry: Investment banking
- Founded: 1950
- Headquarters: Head office in Garching, legal seat in Friedrichshafen, Germany
- Key people: Matthias Benz; Marc de Groen; Christian Dummler; Alexandra Mebus
- Revenue: €4.4 billion (2025)
- Net income: 90,000,000 euro (2018)
- Total assets: 2,383,627,000 euro (2018)
- Number of employees: 12,300 (2025)
- Website: www.zeppelin.com

Zeppelin GmbH, headquartered in Garching with its registered office in Friedrichshafen, is the holding company of an international trading, engineering, and service group. The group offers products and digital services in the areas of construction machinery sales and service, rental, drive and energy systems, as well as engineering and plant engineering.

The Group is represented in 29 countries with over 12,000 employees. In the 2025 financial year, it generated revenue of over 4.4 billion euros. The Group's shareholders are Luftschiffbau Zeppelin GmbH with 96.25% and the Zeppelin Foundation (administered by the City of Friedrichshafen) with 3.75%.

== History ==
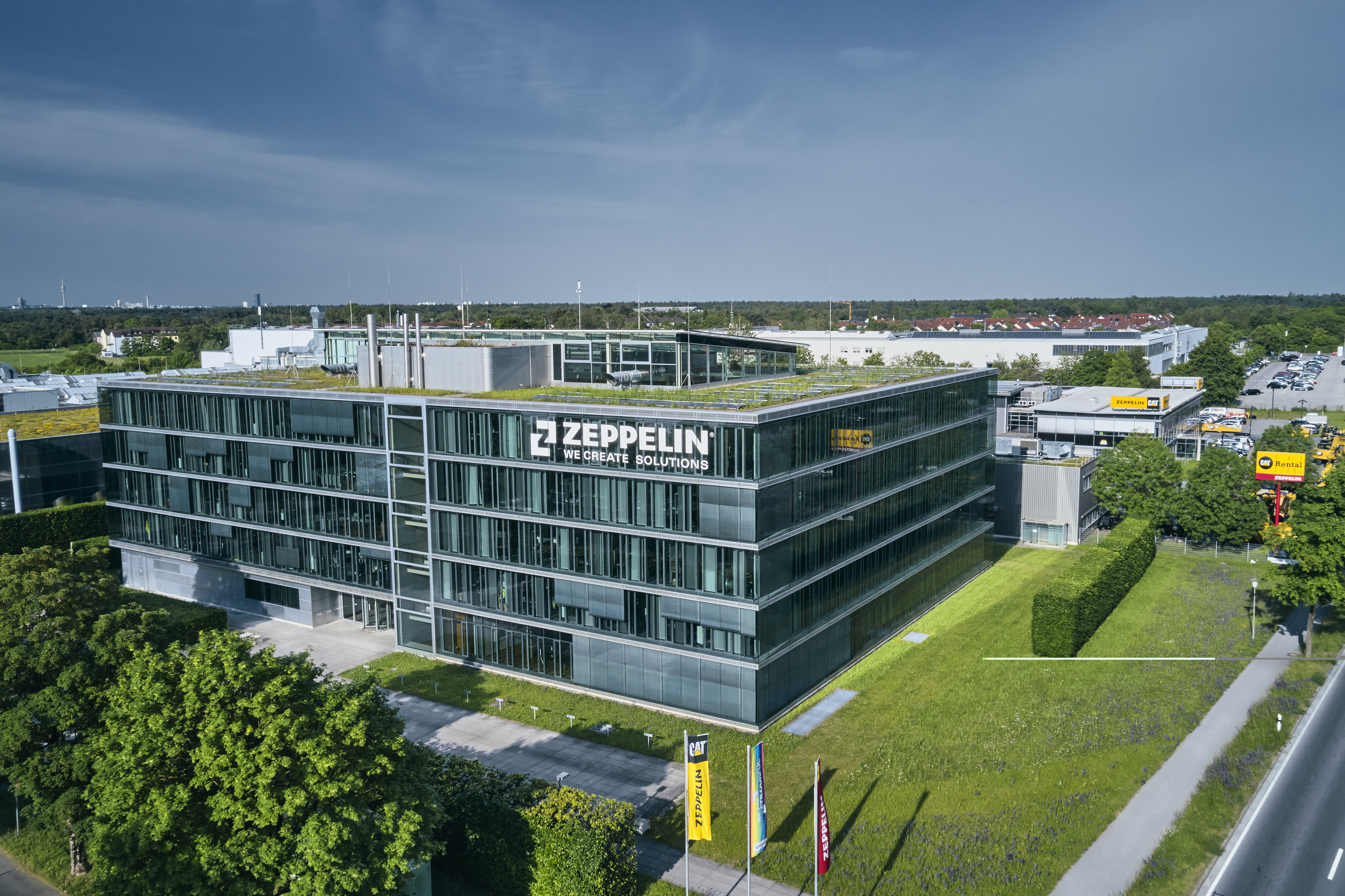
Zeppelin-Headquarter in Garching, 2023

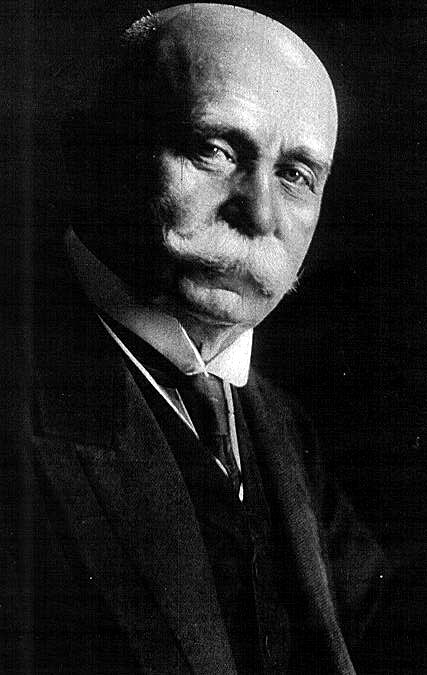
Ferdinand von Zeppelin

=== Origins and foundation of Metallwerk Friedrichshafen GmbH ===
The history goes back to the development of the first airship, Zeppelin LZ 1, by Ferdinand von Zeppelin (1838–1917) and the establishment of the Zeppelin Foundation in 1908. With the Lakehurst disaster in 1937, in which the Hindenburg airship was destroyed near New York, business operations in airship construction came to an end.

After the destruction of the Zeppelin production facilities during World War II, Metallwerk Friedrichshafen GmbH was founded in 1950 and later renamed Zeppelin-Metallwerke GmbH.

In 1954, the company secured the sales and service rights for construction machinery from the American manufacturer Caterpillar Inc. for West Germany; since 1990, the partnership has been in place for the whole of reunified Germany.

=== Since 1990: Transformation into Zeppelin GmbH, international expansion ===
Over the years, Zeppelin-Metallwerke GmbH expanded its business activities across large parts of Western and Eastern Europe. On 1 January 1994, Zeppelin-Metallwerke GmbH took over the tasks of a management holding company and has since coordinated the business of the entire group. The operational business in the various divisions was taken over by newly established or already existing companies in Germany and abroad. In 1995, Zeppelin-Metallwerke GmbH was transformed into Zeppelin GmbH.

Since 1993, airships have once again been manufactured in Friedrichshafen on Lake Constance. In 2003, the expansion of the rental business for construction equipment and site installations began with the acquisition of the Berlin-based rental company MVS Miete Vertrieb Service.

In 2006, all activities related to Caterpillar and Maschinenbau Kiel engines (abbreviated as MaK engines) were consolidated into a dedicated company, Zeppelin Power Systems GmbH & Co. KG. In 2010, the group reorganised its operational areas into five business units, which were expanded in 2020 with the addition of a sixth unit – Construction Equipment Nordics.

As a result of the Russian invasion of Ukraine and the subsequent sanctions, the group’s business in Russia and Belarus largely collapsed from February 2022 onwards. Previously, operations in these countries had generated approximately €500 million in annual revenue. As of 2024, fewer than 100 of the former 1,400 employees remain in Russia. The operating business in Belarus was completely discontinued.

The loss of the Russian market led to a 16% decline in revenue in the 2022 financial year, but rising sales figures in other countries and business areas led to the second-highest pre-tax profit in the company's history at €154 million in 2023.

=== International expansion after the COVID-19 pandemic ===
At the end of 2024, Zeppelin Group announced the acquisition of Pon Equipment & Pon Power BV, commonly referred to as Pepp Group BV, the parent holding company of Caterpillar equipment operations of the netherland-based PON Group. Through this transaction, Zeppelin became the official distribution partner for Caterpillar products in the Netherlands and Norway. The acquisition increased Zeppelin Group’s consolidated revenue from approximately €4.0 billion to €5.1 billion, while adding around 2,000 employees in the Netherlands, Norway, France, Belgium, and Nigeria (reflecting the company’s African operations).

In July 2026, the Supervisory Board, led by Matthias Benz, decided that the parent company should be converted into an Societas Europaea (SE). The change of legal form is scheduled to be completed by mid-2027.

== Company structure, business units and products ==
Zeppelin GmbH is managed by a foundation. The shareholders of the Group are Luftschiffbau Zeppelin GmbH with 96.25% and the Zeppelin Foundation with 3.75%, with Luftschiffbau Zeppelin GmbH in turn being owned by the Zeppelin Foundation, which is therefore the sole owner of Zeppelin GmbH. The CEO of the Zeppelin Group is Matthias Benz, who took over from Peter Gerstmann in October 2024.

The Zeppelin Group organises its Group-wide cooperation in a management holding company, five strategic business units and the strategic management centre Group IT Services. The five business units are Construction Equipment Germany & Austria, Construction Equipment International, Rental, Power Systems and Plant Engineering.

=== Construction Equipment Germany & Austria ===
The business unit Construction Equipment Germany & Austria, consisting of the companies Zeppelin Baumaschinen GmbH and Zeppelin Österreich GmbH, serves as the sales and service partner of the American manufacturer Caterpillar in Germany and Austria.

=== Construction Equipment International ===
The Construction Equipment International business unit manages the sales and service of Caterpillar construction machinery globally. It offers a wide range of machinery and systems for construction, mining, and resource management. Until mid-2023, it was divided into two separate business units: Construction Equipment Nordics and Construction Equipment Eurasia. In 2020, Zeppelin had expanded the distribution of Caterpillar construction machinery to Sweden, Denmark, and Greenland, leading to the creation of Construction Equipment Nordics as a standalone business unit. The Russian business was discontinued in 2022 due to economic sanctions following the start of the Ukraine invasion. In 2023, the group decided to merge Construction Equipment Nordics and Construction Equipment Eurasia into a single unit, Construction Equipment International.

=== Rental ===
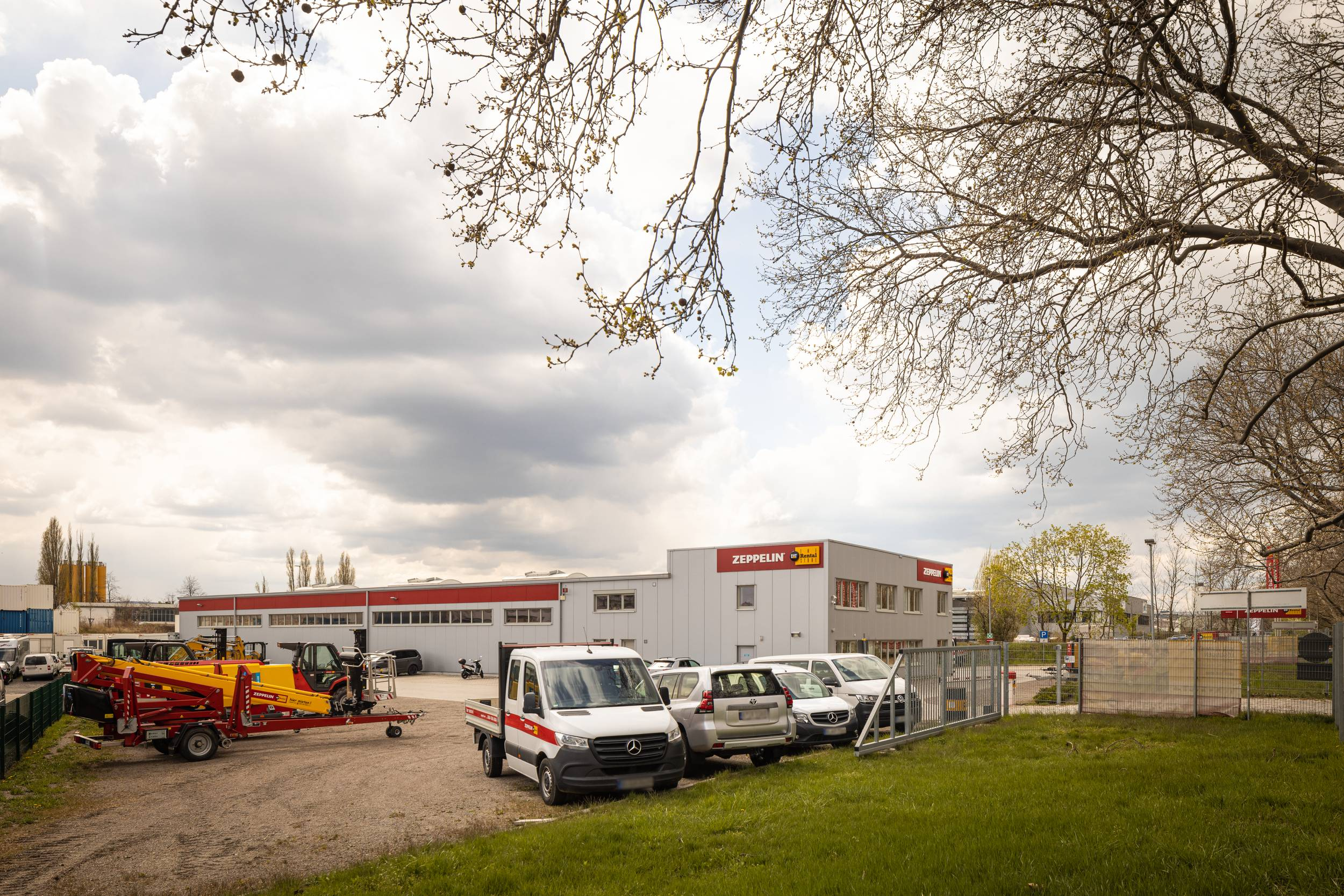
Zeppelin Rental GmbH office in Dresden

The Rental business unit with the German company Zeppelin Rental GmbH is a rental service provider for the construction, industry, trade, and event sectors. Rental is active in Germany, Austria, Slovakia, the Czech Republic, Sweden, and Denmark. In 2022, Zeppelin Rental concluded a five-year framework agreement with Deutsche Bahn for the regular rental of construction machinery and equipment, as well as the sale of small equipment to the railway.

=== Power Systems ===
The Power Systems business unit sells drive and energy systems for industrial and marine applications, rail vehicles, the oil, and gas industry and power and heat generation.

=== Plant Engineering ===
The Plant Engineering business unit develops and manufactures components and systems for handling bulk materials. The systems are used in the chemical, plastics, rubber, and tyre industries as well as in the food industry. The Aviation and Industrial Service division also offers services for the aerospace and automotive industries.

== Sustainability ==
At the beginning of 2023, Zeppelin Systems GmbH founded the Zeppelin Sustainable Tire Alliance. The alliance's most important goal is to increase the amount of tyre recyclates used in the production of new tyres. Also in 2023, a new warehouse covering around 3,500 square metres was built on the Zeppelin site in Friedrichshafen, which is equipped with a photovoltaic system.

The Zeppelin Group is a member of the Forum Compliance Mittelstand (FCM) working group in Germany. The forum is a voluntary association of medium-sized companies and associations and serves to promote and disseminate value-orientated business practices in medium-sized companies.

== Social engagement ==
Zeppelin is the main sponsor of the men’s volleyball team of VfB Friedrichshafen, as well as the men’s first football team of VfB Friedrichshafen. In the field of education, the Zeppelin Group supports the Zeppelin University in Friedrichshafen, founded in 2003, and the youth foundation Just!, which recognises outstanding projects by students in the fields of natural sciences and technology, economics, social sciences, and cultural studies.

Zeppelin also supports the charitable organisation Home from Home, which works to improve the future of orphans, HIV-infected and abandoned children in the townships near Cape Town.

== Literature ==
- Langenscheidt, Florian (2015). Marken des Jahrhunderts [Brands of the century] (in German). Cologne: Deutsche Standards. ISBN 978-3-942597-49-4
