= Helga Lopez =

German politician (1952–2022)

Member of the Bundestag; for Lahn-Dill
- In office 18 October 2005 – 27 October 2009
- Preceded by: Erika Lotz
- Succeeded by: Sibylle Pfeiffer

Personal details
- Born: Helga Schmidt; 7 August 1952 Giessen, West Germany
- Died: 12 June 2022 (aged 69)
- Party: Social Democratic
- Education: Landesfinanzschule Rotenburg

Helga Lopez (née Schmidt; 7 August 1952 – 12 June 2022) was a German politician. A member of the Social Democratic Party of Germany, she served in the Bundestag from 2005 to 2009.

Lopez died on 12 June 2022 at the age of 69.
