= Lahn-Dill =

Federal electoral district of Germany

171 Lahn-Dill
- Electoral district for the Bundestag
- Lahn-Dill in 2025
- State: Hesse
- Population: 275,900 (2019)
- Electorate: 206,532 (2021)
- Major settlements: Wetzlar; Dillenburg; Herborn
- Area: 1,153.2 km^{2}

Current electoral district
- Created: 1949
- Party: CDU
- Member: Johannes Volkmann
- Elected: 2025

Lahn-Dill is an electoral constituency (German: Wahlkreis) represented in the Bundestag. It elects one member via first-past-the-post voting. Under the current constituency numbering system, it is designated as constituency 171. It is located in western Hesse, comprising the Lahn-Dill-Kreis district and a small part of the Gießen district.

Lahn-Dill was created for the inaugural 1949 federal election. From 2021 to 2025, it has been represented by Dagmar Schmidt of the Social Democratic Party (SPD). Since 2025 it is represented by Johannes Volkmann of the CDU.

== Geography ==
Lahn-Dill is located in western Hesse. As of the 2021 federal election, it comprises the Lahn-Dill-Kreis district and the municipalities of Biebertal and Wettenberg from the Gießen district.

== History ==
Lahn-Dill was created in 1949, then known as Wetzlar. It acquired its current name in the 1980 election. In the 1949 election, it was Hesse constituency 7 in the numbering system. In the 1953 through 1976 elections, it was number 132. From 1980 through 1998, it was number 130. In 2002 and 2005, it was number 174. In the 2009 election, it was number 173. In the 2013 through 2021 elections, it was number 172. From the 2025 election, it has been number 171.

Originally, the constituency comprised the districts of Wetzlar and Dillkreis. In the 1980 through 1998 elections, it comprised the Lahn-Dill-Kreis district as well as, from the Gießen district, the municipalities of Biebertal and Wettenberg and the Stadtteil of Lützellinden from Gießen municipality. In the 2002 election, it lost the Stadtteil of Lützellinden.

Election	No.	Name	Borders
1949	7	Wetzlar	Wetzlar district; Dillkreis district
1953	132	Wetzlar	Wetzlar district; Dillkreis district
1957	132	Wetzlar	Wetzlar district; Dillkreis district
1961	132	Wetzlar	Wetzlar district; Dillkreis district
1965	132	Wetzlar	Wetzlar district; Dillkreis district
1969	132	Wetzlar	Wetzlar district; Dillkreis district
1972	132	Wetzlar	Wetzlar district; Dillkreis district
1976	132	Wetzlar	Wetzlar district; Dillkreis district
1980	130	Lahn-Dill	Lahn-Dill-Kreis district; Gießen district (only Biebertal, Gießen (only Lützellinden Stadtteil), and Wettenberg municipalities)
1983	130	Lahn-Dill	Lahn-Dill-Kreis district; Gießen district (only Biebertal, Gießen (only Lützellinden Stadtteil), and Wettenberg municipalities)
1987	130	Lahn-Dill	Lahn-Dill-Kreis district; Gießen district (only Biebertal, Gießen (only Lützellinden Stadtteil), and Wettenberg municipalities)
1990	130	Lahn-Dill	Lahn-Dill-Kreis district; Gießen district (only Biebertal, Gießen (only Lützellinden Stadtteil), and Wettenberg municipalities)
1994	130	Lahn-Dill	Lahn-Dill-Kreis district; Gießen district (only Biebertal, Gießen (only Lützellinden Stadtteil), and Wettenberg municipalities)
1998	130	Lahn-Dill	Lahn-Dill-Kreis district; Gießen district (only Biebertal, Gießen (only Lützellinden Stadtteil), and Wettenberg municipalities)
2002	174	Lahn-Dill	Lahn-Dill-Kreis district; Gießen district (only Biebertal and Wettenberg municipalities)
2005	174	Lahn-Dill	Lahn-Dill-Kreis district; Gießen district (only Biebertal and Wettenberg municipalities)
2009	173	Lahn-Dill	Lahn-Dill-Kreis district; Gießen district (only Biebertal and Wettenberg municipalities)
2013	172	Lahn-Dill	Lahn-Dill-Kreis district; Gießen district (only Biebertal and Wettenberg municipalities)
2017	172	Lahn-Dill	Lahn-Dill-Kreis district; Gießen district (only Biebertal and Wettenberg municipalities)
2021	172	Lahn-Dill	Lahn-Dill-Kreis district; Gießen district (only Biebertal and Wettenberg municipalities)
2025	171	Lahn-Dill	Lahn-Dill-Kreis district; Gießen district (only Biebertal and Wettenberg municipalities)

== Members ==
The constituency was first represented by Karl Gaul of the Free Democratic Party (FDP) from 1949 to 1953. Wilhelm Reitz of the Social Democratic Party (SPD) was elected in 1953 and served until 1969. He was succeeded by fellow SPD members Helmut Kater until 1976 and Klaus Daubertshäuser until 1983. Christian Lenzer of the Christian Democratic Union (CDU) was elected in 1983, but former member Daubertshäuser regained the constituency in 1987 and served a further two terms. He was succeeded by fellow party member Erika Lotz in 1994, who served until 2002. Helga Lopez of the SPD served from 2005 to 2009, when Sibylle Pfeiffer of the CDU won the constituency. She was succeeded by Hans-Jürgen Irmer in 2017. Dagmar Schmidt regained it for the SPD in 2021.

Election	Member	Party	%
1949	Karl Gaul	FDP	29.8
1953	Wilhelm Reitz	SPD	30.6
1957	Wilhelm Reitz	SPD	37.8
1961	Wilhelm Reitz	SPD	45.2
1965	Wilhelm Reitz	SPD	47.8
1969	Helmut Kater	SPD	49.9
1972	Helmut Kater	SPD	55.0
1976	Klaus Daubertshäuser	SPD	47.2
1980	Klaus Daubertshäuser	SPD	51.5
1983	Christian Lenzer	CDU	47.3
1987	Klaus Daubertshäuser	SPD	47.3
1990	Klaus Daubertshäuser	SPD	45.6
1994	Erika Lotz	SPD	44.8
1998	Erika Lotz	SPD	48.5
2002	Erika Lotz	SPD	46.9
2005	Helga Lopez	SPD	42.2
2009	Sibylle Pfeiffer	CDU	41.6
2013	Sibylle Pfeiffer	CDU	48.1
2017	Hans-Jürgen Irmer	CDU	38.3
2021	Dagmar Schmidt	SPD	33.1
2025	Johannes Volkmann	CDU	34.3

== Election results ==
=== 2025 election ===
Federal election (2025): Lahn-Dill
Notes:	Blue background denotes the winner of the electorate vote. Pink background denotes a candidate elected from their party list. Yellow background denotes an electorate win by a list member, or other incumbent. A ✓ or ✗ denotes status of any incumbent, win or lose respectively.						
Party	Candidate	Votes	%	±%	Party votes	%	±%
CDU	Johannes Volkmann	56,420	34.3	▲4.2	49,667	30.2	▲5.2
SPD	✗ Dagmar Schmidt	39,556	24.1	▼9.0	31,086	18.9	▼10.5
AfD	Klaus Niggemann	37,997	23.1	▲12.6	37,483	22.8	▲11.2
Greens	Jan Marien	11,202	6.8	▼2.3	14,492	8.8	▼2.4
Left	Tim-Christopher Sinkel	8,678	5.3	▲2.1	10,932	6.6	▲3.3
BSW					7,007	4.3	New
FDP	Carsten Seelmeyer	4,544	2.8	▼5.2	6,699	4.1	▼7.4
FW	Felix Müller	3,807	2.3	▼0.7	2,415	1.5	▼0.5
Tierschutzpartei					2,252	1.4	▼0.1
Volt	Dominik Göwel	2,210	1.3	New	1,178	0.7	▲0.5
PARTEI					1,023	0.6	▼0.5
BD					277	0.2	New
Humanists					123	0.1	0.0
MLPD					64	<0.1	0.0
Informal votes		1,682			1,398		
Total valid votes		164,414			164,698		
Turnout		166,096	81.6	▲7.3			
CDU gain from SPD	Majority	16,864	10.2	N/A			

=== 2021 election ===
Federal election (2021): Lahn-Dill
Notes:	Blue background denotes the winner of the electorate vote. Pink background denotes a candidate elected from their party list. Yellow background denotes an electorate win by a list member, or other incumbent. A ✓ or ✗ denotes status of any incumbent, win or lose respectively.						
Party	Candidate	Votes	%	±%	Party votes	%	±%
SPD	Dagmar Schmidt	49,923	33.1	▲3.3	44,546	29.4	▲4.7
CDU	✗ Hans-Jürgen Irmer	45,441	30.1	▼8.2	37,725	24.9	▼8.5
AfD	Willi Wagner	15,816	10.5	▼1.2	17,513	11.6	▼2.1
Greens	Caroline Krohn	13,754	9.1	▲3.3	16,957	11.2	▲4.2
FDP	Carsten Seelmeyer	12,060	8.0	▲1.7	17,327	11.4	▲1.7
Left	Christiane Ohnacker	4,756	3.1	▼1.5	5,102	3.4	▼3.3
FW	Karsten Stahl	4,579	3.0	▲1.9	3,051	2.0	▲1.0
Tierschutzpartei					2,240	1.5	▲0.5
PARTEI	Niklas Hartmann	2,417	1.6	▲0.3	1,636	1.1	▲0.1
dieBasis	Heiko Schuster	2,040	1.4		1,946	1.3	
Team Todenhöfer					720	0.5	
Bündnis C					524	0.3	
Pirates					449	0.3	▼0.1
Volt					399	0.3	
NPD					382	0.3	▼0.3
Independent	Manuel Haunsner	259	0.2				
Gesundheitsforschung					239	0.2	
ÖDP					238	0.2	▼0.1
Humanists					119	0.1	
V-Partei3					118	0.1	0.0
DKP					74	0.0	0.0
Bündnis 21					39	0.0	
LKR					39	0.0	
MLPD					17	0.0	0.0
Informal votes		2,349			1,984		
Total valid votes		151,045			151,400		
Turnout		153,384	74.3	0.0			
SPD gain from CDU	Majority	4,482	3.0				

=== 2017 election ===
Federal election (2017): Lahn-Dill
Notes:	Blue background denotes the winner of the electorate vote. Pink background denotes a candidate elected from their party list. Yellow background denotes an electorate win by a list member, or other incumbent. A ✓ or ✗ denotes status of any incumbent, win or lose respectively.						
Party	Candidate	Votes	%	±%	Party votes	%	±%
CDU	Hans-Jürgen Irmer	58,417	38.3	▼9.8	51,125	33.5	▼8.3
SPD	Dagmar Schmidt	45,375	29.7	▼4.7	37,794	24.7	▼5.6
AfD	Willi Wagner	17,874	11.7		20,931	13.7	▲7.9
FDP	Carsten Seelmeyer	9,590	6.3	▲4.2	14,821	9.7	▲5.3
Greens	Thorben Sämann	8,909	5.8	▼0.2	10,768	7.0	▼0.4
Left	Tamina Veit	7,116	4.7	0.0	10,210	6.7	▲1.5
PARTEI	Dominic Harapat	2,024	1.3		1,429	0.9	▲0.5
FW	Engin Eroglu	1,789	1.2		1,564	1.0	▲0.2
Tierschutzpartei					1,437	0.9	
NPD	Thomas Hantusch	773	0.5	▼1.5	897	0.6	▼1.0
Independent	Hans-Odo Sattler	687	0.5				
Pirates					534	0.3	▼1.4
DM					399	0.3	
ÖDP					361	0.2	
BGE					234	0.2	
V-Partei³					173	0.1	
DKP					53	0.0	
MLPD					40	0.0	0.0
BüSo					31	0.0	0.0
Informal votes		2,448			2,201		
Total valid votes		152,554			152,801		
Turnout		155,002	74.3	▲4.6			
CDU hold	Majority	13,042	8.6	▼5.0			

=== 2013 election ===
Federal election (2013): Lahn-Dill
Notes:	Blue background denotes the winner of the electorate vote. Pink background denotes a candidate elected from their party list. Yellow background denotes an electorate win by a list member, or other incumbent. A ✓ or ✗ denotes status of any incumbent, win or lose respectively.						
Party	Candidate	Votes	%	±%	Party votes	%	±%
CDU	✓ Sibylle Pfeiffer	68,666	48.1	▲6.5	59,760	41.8	▲7.1
SPD	Dagmar Schmidt	49,213	34.5	▲1.4	43,406	30.3	▲2.5
Greens	Priska Hinz	8,647	6.1	▼1.6	10,600	7.4	▼1.8
AfD					8,315	5.8	
Left	Hans-Horst Knies	6,603	4.6	▼2.2	7,433	5.2	▼3.2
Pirates	Horst Weintraut	3,265	2.3		2,533	1.8	▼0.3
FDP	Wolfgang Berns	3,033	2.1	▼6.8	6,323	4.4	▼10.1
NPD	Thomas Hantusch	2,867	2.0	0.0	2,253	1.6	0.0
FW					1,250	0.9	
PARTEI					566	0.4	
Independent	Andreas Rentzos	541	0.4				
REP					288	0.2	▼0.3
PRO					213	0.1	
BüSo					63	0.0	▼0.1
SGP					63	0.0	
MLPD					37	0.0	0.0
Informal votes		4,108			3,840		
Total valid votes		142,835			143,103		
Turnout		146,943	69.7	▲0.1			
CDU hold	Majority	19,453	13.6	▲5.1			

=== 2009 election ===
Federal election (2009): Lahn-Dill
Notes:	Blue background denotes the winner of the electorate vote. Pink background denotes a candidate elected from their party list. Yellow background denotes an electorate win by a list member, or other incumbent. A ✓ or ✗ denotes status of any incumbent, win or lose respectively.						
Party	Candidate	Votes	%	±%	Party votes	%	±%
CDU	Sibylle Pfeiffer	60,214	41.6	▲1.0	50,391	34.7	▲0.2
SPD	Dagmar Schmidt	47,897	33.1	▼9.1	40,485	27.9	▼9.4
FDP	Wolfgang Berns	12,968	9.0	▲4.4	21,137	14.6	▲3.8
Greens	Priska Hinz	11,032	7.6	▲3.2	13,382	9.2	▲1.7
Left	Nerman Göktas	9,815	6.8	▲2.1	12,133	8.4	▲2.6
Pirates					2,972	2.0	
NPD	Thorsten Groß	2,922	2.0	▼0.3	2,236	1.5	▼0.4
Tierschutzpartei					1,431	1.0	▲0.2
REP					741	0.5	▼0.4
BüSo					147	0.1	0.0
DVU					127	0.1	
MLPD					40	0.0	0.0
Informal votes		3,104			2,730		
Total valid votes		144,848			145,222		
Turnout		147,952	69.6	▼6.1			
CDU gain from SPD	Majority	12,317	8.5				

=== 2005 election ===
Federal election (2005):Lahn-Dill
Notes:	Blue background denotes the winner of the electorate vote. Pink background denotes a candidate elected from their party list. Yellow background denotes an electorate win by a list member, or other incumbent. A ✓ or ✗ denotes status of any incumbent, win or lose respectively.						
Party	Candidate	Votes	%	±%	Party votes	%	±%
SPD	Helga Lopez	66,250	42.2	▼4.7	58,583	37.3	▼4.5
CDU	Sibylle Pfeiffer	63,801	40.6	▼0.6	54,175	34.5	▼4.0
Left	Joachim Kaufhold-Hausotter	7,321	4.7	▲3.7	9,014	5.7	▲4.7
FDP	Sigrid Kornmann	7,130	4.5	▼0.9	16,852	10.7	▲3.1
Greens	Priska Hinz	6,959	4.4	▲0.4	11,793	7.5	▲0.2
NPD	Doris Zutt	3,648	2.3	▲0.7	3,053	1.9	▲1.2
PBC	Erwin Bunk	2,019	1.3				
REP					1,378	0.9	▲0.1
Tierschutzpartei					1,296	0.8	▲0.4
GRAUEN					555	0.4	▲0.2
SGP					215	0.1	
BüSo					123	0.1	▲0.1
MLPD					51	0.0	
Informal votes		3,638			3,678		
Total valid votes		157,128			157,088		
Turnout		160,766	75.7	▼1.6			
SPD hold	Majority	2,449	1.6				
