= Operation Zeppelin =

Operation Zeppelin may refer to:

== Military ==
A military operation during World War II:

- Operation Zeppelin (espionage plan), a 1941–45 German scheme to recruit Soviet POWs for espionage behind Russian lines
- Operation Zeppelin (deception plan), a 1944 Allied scheme to divert attention from the invasion of Normandy

== Other uses ==
- A DC Comics storyline involving STAR Labs returning Electrocutioner and other supervillains to Limbo

== See also ==
- Zeppelin (disambiguation)
