= TRW Automotive =

American industrial company

TRW Automotive Holdings Corp.

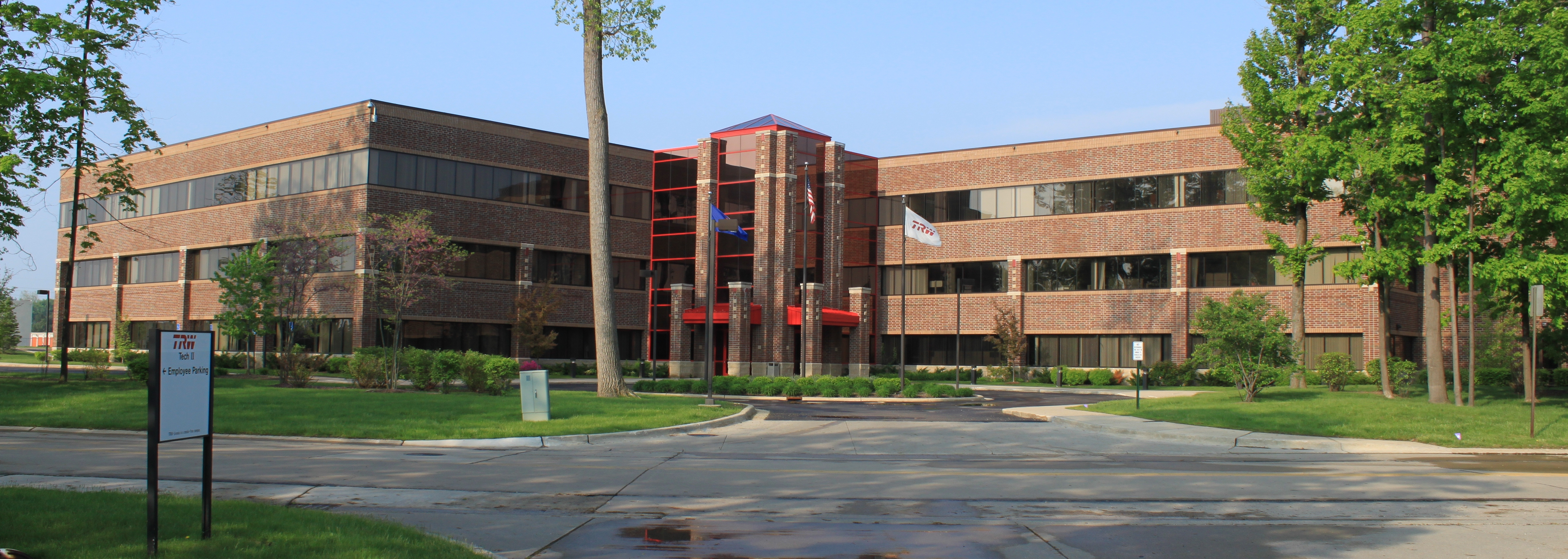
- Former headquarters in Livonia, Michigan
- Type: Subsidiary
- Traded as: NYSE: TRW
- Industry: Automotive industry
- Predecessor: TRW Inc.
- Founded: 2002
- Defunct: 2015
- Fate: Acquired
- Successor: ZF TRW Automotive Holdings Corp
- Headquarters: Livonia, Michigan, United States
- Number of locations: 200+ facilities
- Area served: Worldwide
- Key people: John C. Plant (Chairman & CEO)
- Products: Automotive systems
- Revenue: ▲US$ 16.4 billion (FY 2012)
- Operating income: ▼US$ 1.09 billion (FY 2012)
- Net income: ▼US$ 1.01 billion (FY 2012)
- Total assets: ▲US$ 10.9 billion (FY 2012)
- Total equity: ▼US$ 3.70 billion (FY 2012)
- Number of employees: 66,100
- Website: www.trwaftermarket.com/us/

TRW Automotive Holdings Corp. was an American global supplier of automotive systems, modules, and components to automotive original equipment manufacturers (OEMs) and related aftermarkets. Tracing its roots from TRW Inc. it was originally headquartered in Livonia, Michigan. It was created in 2002 when the aerospace company Northrop Grumman purchased TRW and sold its automotive division to Blackstone Group.

TRW Automotive was the eighth largest automotive supplier worldwide and the seventh-largest company in the Detroit Metro Area and had nearly 64,000 employees in 22 countries worldwide. In 2015, TRW Automotive was acquired by German ZF Friedrichshafen and subsequently renamed ZF TRW Automotive Holdings Corp prior to being incorporated into ZF from 2016.

== Overview and history ==
TRW Automotive was an American company based in Livonia, Michigan. Tracing its roots to TRW Inc., TRW Automotive's production featured a variety of automotive products including integrated vehicle control and driver assist systems, braking systems, steering systems, suspension systems, seat belts and airbags, and engine valves among others. The company's operational activities were divided into 4 segments, Chassis Systems, Occupant Safety Systems, Electronics, and Automotive Components.

== Further developments ==
In 2002, aerospace company Northrop Grumman purchased TRW, and subsequently sold TRW's automotive division to private equity firm Blackstone Group for $4.73 billion. According to the final agreement, Blackstone owned 80.4% of the business, while Northrop Grumman acquired 19.6% of it. In a statement, John Plant, the CEO of TRW Automotive said, "The company is now 100 percent focused on the needs of automotive customers, and we have an exciting opportunity to capitalize on our position as the global leader in automotive safety."

In 2009, TRW Automotive made net profit earnings of $76 million. The next year, the firm had a profit of $189 million, which was more than double than the previous year. According to Plant, that was a result of the industry recovery following the 2008 financial crisis and the company's venture into emerging markets. On September 15, 2014, it was announced that German car parts maker ZF Friedrichshafen would buy TRW Automotive for approximately $13.5 billion including debt. The takeover was completed on 15 May 2015, and TRW Automotive now operates as part of ZF Friedrichshafen AG, as Division 'Active & Passive Safety Technology'.

== TRW Automotive milestones ==
- 2002 - produced the first generation of Active Control Retractor.
- 2002 - introduced the first caliper of Electric Park Brake.
- 2003 - produced a weight-based Occupant Classification System.
- 2004 - revealed silicon initiator technology for airbag inflators.
- 2004 - created a Touch Sensor Technology capacitive sensing for interior vehicle controls.
- 2005 - unveiled Active Dynamic Control family of active suspension systems.
- 2006 - produced a non-rotating driver airbag technology.
- 2006 - revealed a Slip Control Boost hybrid braking stability control technology.
- 2007 - produced an Efficient Climate Control system to maintain occupant comfort and enhance fuel economy.
- 2007 - created an Electric Drum-in-Hat park brake technology.
- 2007 - introduced ESC-R regenerative brake technology for hybrid vehicles.
- 2008 - revealed an Active Buckle Lifter seat belt system to enhance convenience, comfort and safety.
- 2008 - produced the First Lane Keeping System, integrating camera and electric steering technology.
- 2008 - introduced a Head protection system for convertible vehicles.
- 2008 - developed a Scalable Airbag Electronic Control Unit for emerging markets.
- 2014 - produced the second generation of Active Control Retractor.
- 2015 - TRW Automotive was acquired by ZF Friedrichshafen.
