= Zeppelin Museum =

A number of institutions are called Zeppelin Museum:

== Germany ==
- Zeppelin Museum Friedrichshafen, a museum in on Lake Constance in Germany, housing the world's largest aviation collection and chronicling the history of the Zeppelin airships.
- Zeppelin-Museum Meersburg, Meersburg, with parts, inventory, uniforms and models
- Albert-Sammt-Zeppelin-Museum, Niederstetten, Main-Tauber district, Baden-Württemberg, named in memory of last airship captain Albert Sammt
- Zeppelin Museum Zeppelinheim, Neu-Isenburg near Frankfurt am Main, with a museum building resembling a quarter section of the hull of the LZ 10
- Zeppelin hangars in the Aeronauticum museum in Nordholz

== Denmark ==
- Zeppelin and Garrison Museum, Tønder, Southern Denmark

== See also ==
- Zeppelin (disambiguation)
