= Christian Lenzer =

German politician (1933–2022)

Member of the Bundestag; from Hesse
- In office 20 October 1969 – 26 October 1998
- Constituency: State list (1969–1983); Lahn-Dill (1983–1987); State list (1987–1998)

Personal details
- Born: 19 February 1933 Herborn, Gau Hesse-Nassau, Germany
- Died: 21 September 2022 (aged 89) Herborn, Hesse, Germany
- Party: Christian Democratic Union

Christian Lenzer (19 February 1933 – 21 September 2022) was a German politician of the Christian Democratic Union (CDU) and former member of the German Bundestag.

== Life ==
Lenzer was a secondary school teacher by profession and has been a member of the CDU since 1963. He was a member of the German Bundestag from 1969 to 1998. With the exception of the 1983 federal election, Lenzer was always elected to the Bundestag via the Hessen state list. In 1983 Lenzer was elected directly in the constituency of Lahn-Dill.

== Literature ==
Herbst, Ludolf; Jahn, Bruno (2002). Vierhaus, Rudolf (ed.). Biographisches Handbuch der Mitglieder des Deutschen Bundestages. 1949–2002 [Biographical Handbook of the Members of the German Bundestag. 1949–2002] (in German). München: De Gruyter - De Gruyter Saur. p. 1715. ISBN 978-3-11-184511-1.
