= Karl Gaul =

German politician (1889–1972)

Member of the Bundestag; from Hesse
- In office 7 September 1949 – 15 October 1957
- Preceded by: Constituency established
- Succeeded by: Multi-member district
- Constituency: Wetzlar (1949–1953); State list (1953–1957)

Member of the Landtag of Hesse; for Wahlkreis XV
- In office 1 December 1946 – 1 December 1950
- Preceded by: Constituency established
- Succeeded by: Constituency abolished

Personal details
- Born: 1 February 1889 Nauborn, Germany
- Died: 17 January 1972 (aged 82) Offenbach am Main, West Germany
- Party: Free Democratic Party
- Other political affiliations: DDP (1919–1930)

Karl Gaul (1 February 1889 – 17 January 1972) was a German politician of the Free Democratic Party (FDP) and former member of the German Bundestag.

== Political career ==
Gaul had been involved in politics since 1911 and joined the DDP in 1919. In 1945, he participated in the founding of the Liberal Democratic Party (LDP), which later became the Hessian state association of the FDP. Member of Parliament Gaul was a member of the Hessian state parliament from 1946 to 1950. He had been a member of the German Bundestag since its first election in 1949 until 1957, where he was chairman of the Bundestag committee for cultural policy.

== Literature ==
Herbst, Ludolf; Jahn, Bruno (2002). Vierhaus, Rudolf (ed.). Biographisches Handbuch der Mitglieder des Deutschen Bundestages. 1949–2002 [Biographical Handbook of the Members of the German Bundestag. 1949–2002] (in German). München: De Gruyter - De Gruyter Saur. p. 1715. ISBN 978-3-11-184511-1.
