= Zeppelin Foundation =

Foundation in Friedrichshafen, Germany

The Zeppelin Foundation is an institution founded by Ferdinand von Zeppelin. Originally founded to support development of zeppelins and other airships, it now owns a number of large businesses in full or in part and uses its income for philanthropic efforts.

The Zeppelin Foundation, headquartered in Friedrichshafen, is a legally dependent municipality. Since 1947, the city has managed the funds and ensures that they are used for their intended purpose. The foundation holds 93.8% of the shares of ZF Friedrichshafen and is the owner of Luftschiffbau Zeppelin and Zeppelin GmbH. The foundation finances various charitable purposes, including Zeppelin University and the Zeppelin Museum.
