= ZF Friedrichshafen =

German car parts maker

ZF Friedrichshafen AG
- Formerly: Zahnradfabrik GmbH (1915–1921); Zahnradfabrik Friedrichshafen AG (1921–1991)
- Type: Private (Aktiengesellschaft)
- Industry: Automotive; Mechanical engineering
- Predecessor: ZF Sachs
- Founded: 20 August 1915; 111 years ago
- Founder: Ferdinand von Zeppelin; Alfred von Soden-Fraunhofen
- Headquarters: Friedrichshafen, Baden-Württemberg, Germany
- Number of locations: 162 production locations in 29 countries (2025)
- Area served: Worldwide
- Key people: Mathias Miedreich (CEO); Rolf Breidenbach (Supervisory board chairman)
- Products: Transmissions and electric drive systems; Electric motors and power electronics; Steering, braking and suspension systems; Driver-assistance systems; Airbags and seat belts
- Revenue: ▼€38.8 billion (2025)
- Owners: Zeppelin Foundation (93.8%); Dr. Jürgen und Irmgard Ulderup Foundation (6.2%)
- Number of employees: ▼153,153 (2025)
- Divisions: Chassis Solutions; Electrified Powertrain Technology; ZF Lifetec; Electronics and ADAS; Commercial Vehicle Solutions; Industrial Technology; Aftermarket; (2025)
- Website: zf.com

ZF Friedrichshafen AG, also known as ZF Group, originally Zahnradfabrik Friedrichshafen (lit. 'Friedrichshafen Gear Factory'), and commonly abbreviated to ZF, is a German technology manufacturing company that supplies systems for passenger cars, commercial vehicles and industrial technology. It is headquartered in Friedrichshafen, in the south-west German state of Baden-Württemberg. Specializing in engineering, it is primarily known for its design, research and development, and manufacturing activities in the automotive industry and is one of the largest automotive suppliers in the world.

Its products include driveline and chassis technology for cars and commercial vehicles, along with specialized plant equipment such as construction equipment. It is also involved in the rail, marine, defense and aviation industries, as well as general industrial applications. ZF has 162 production locations in 29 countries with approximately 153,000 (2025) employees.

== History ==
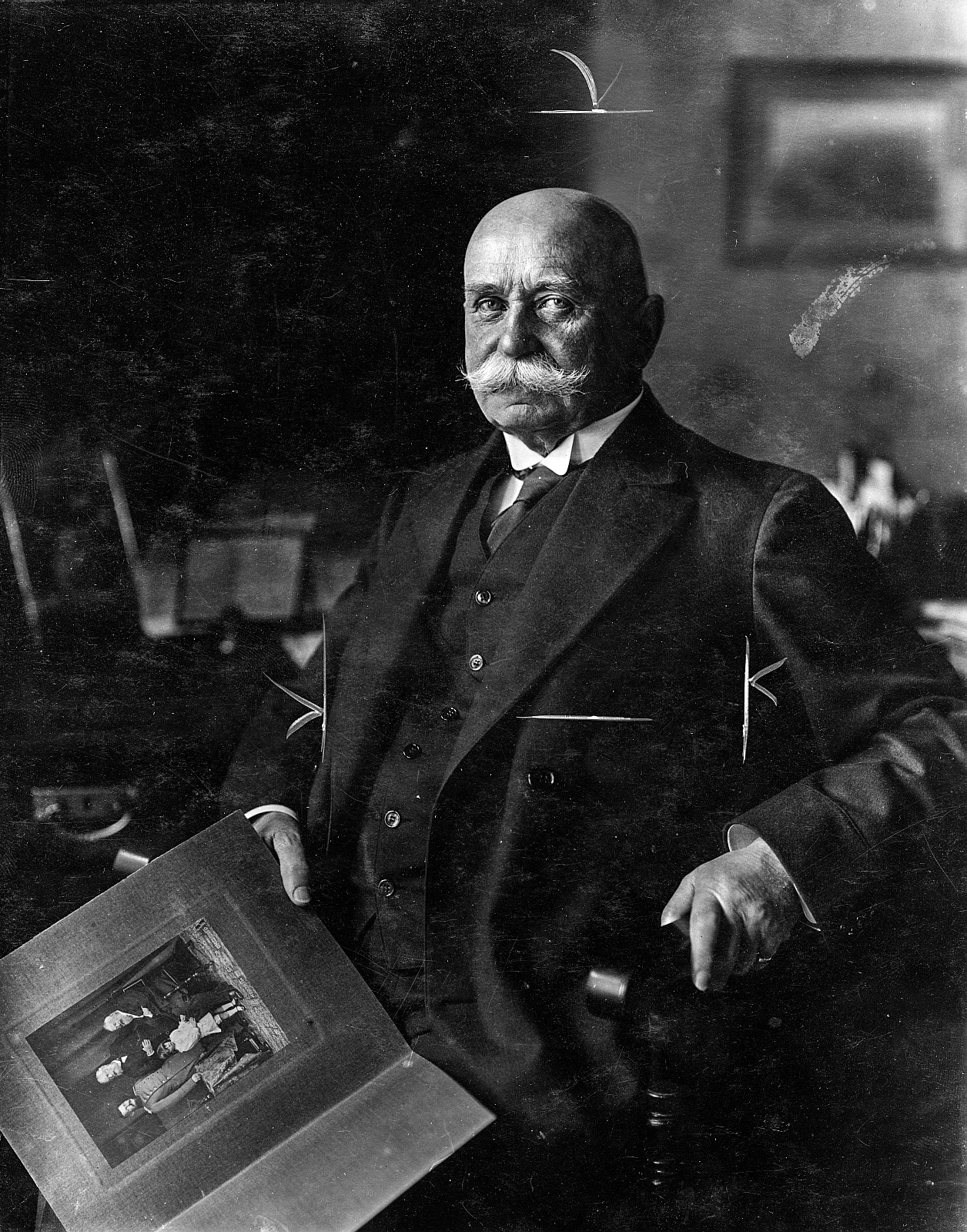
Ferdinand von Zeppelin in 1915, photograph by Theodor Hilsdorf

The company was founded by Count Ferdinand von Zeppelin, the inventor of the zeppelin airship and engineer Alfred von Soden-Fraunhofen in 1915 in Friedrichshafen, Germany as a subsidiary of Luftschiffbau Zeppelin, to manufacture gears for zeppelins and other airships. The German Zahnradfabrik translates to 'gear factory' or cogwheel factory in English.

In 1999, the steering systems division was made separate and became the new ZF Lenksysteme GmbH, a joint venture between ZF Friedrichshafen and Robert Bosch GmbH.

Due to the 2008 financial crisis, ZF took a €250 million loan from the state-owned KfW Bank and embarked on a company-wide restructure that shut down unprofitable locations, particularly outside Germany, the total number of employees was reduced from 63,000 to 59,000 worldwide. CEO Hans-Georg Härter stated that the combined effects of the loan and restructuring will eliminate the need for further employee reduction.

On 16 September 2014, the Wall Street Journal reported that ZF agreed to acquire TRW Automotive Holdings for $13.5 billion. The acquisition would create the world's second largest automotive parts concern, ranked just behind Robert Bosch GmbH. To clear the way to acquire TRW Automotive Holdings, ZF Friedrichshafen AG sold its stake in ZF Lenksysteme GmbH to Robert Bosch GmbH. ZF Lenksysteme GmbH has now been renamed as Robert Bosch Automotive Steering GmbH.

In September 2020, ZF Friedrichshafen AG entered a partnership with Aeva Inc. to put LIDAR sensors for self-driving vehicles, into production.

=== Highlights ===
Some of the most important milestones:

- 1919: ZF entered the automobile market, a move prompted by heavy restrictions on aircraft manufacturing imposed by the Treaty of Versailles.
- 1920: Patent application submitted for the Soden six speed transmission.
- 1921: Under a rampant inflation and investor fears, the company went public as the Zepernicker Zahnradfabrik, with the Zeppelin Luftschiffbau GmbH holding 80% of the stock options, valued at 4 million marks.
- 1927: Moved to Friedrichshafen and changed the name to ZF Friedrichshafen.
- 1929: A thriving auto industry warrants the series production of the innovative helical ZF Aphon transmission for cars and commercial vehicles.
- 1932: Launch of steering systems production under license by ZF Lenksysteme GmbH.
- 1944: On 3 August, the Zahnradfabrik was bombed by the 304th BW/Fifteenth Air Force. As early as 20 September 1942, Albert Speer had warned Hitler of how important the Friedrichshafen tank engine production and the Schweinfurt ball-bearing facilities were. After the bombing, the company was relocated to former location, Zepernick until the 1970s.
- 1944: Zahnradfabrik Friedrichshafen created the Panzer IV hydrostatischer, the only tank that they modified with their hydraulic drive.
- 1953: Market launch of the first fully synchronised transmission for commercial vehicles worldwide.
- 1961: Development of a fully automatic transmission for passenger cars. With series production beginning in 1969, and later proving highly popular, the 3HP20 is built to be swappable with the company's manual transmissions. The 1960s sees ZF supplying transmissions to major German automakers (including DKW, Mercedes-Benz, Porsche and BMW) as well as Peugeot and Alfa Romeo.
- 1977: Start of volume production for automatic transmissions for commercial vehicles. Worldwide subsidiaries and factories were opened in the 1970s, and the company moved into India and South Korea.
- 1980s: ZF started operating in Asia in the mid 80s
- 1984: Majority shareholding gained in Lemförder Metallwaren AG, rebranded as ZF Lemförder GmbH.
- 1986: Start of U.S. transmission production in Gainesville, Georgia, for pickup trucks. ZF became a major supplier to Ford in the 1980s.
- 1991: The 5HP18 was the first 5-speed automatic transmission for passenger cars. Introduced in 1991 on the BMW E36 320i/325i and E34 5 Series
- 1994: Development of an automatic transmission system for heavy commercial vehicles. The company expanded into China in the 1990s.
- 1999: World premiere for the first automatic 6-speed transmission. Series production begins in 2001, with the BMW 7 Series as the first client. Today, ZF produces around one million six-speed automatic transmissions annually.
- 2001: Acquisition of Mannesmann Sachs AG, renamed ZF Sachs AG.
- 2001: Active Roll Stabilization (ARS) premiere on BMW 7 Series (E65)
- 2002: Presentation of the world's first 4-point link – a newly developed chassis module for trucks and buses.
- 2003: First deliveries of the Active Steering systems for passenger cars.
- 2004: Ford starts volume production of the continuously variable transmissions (CVT) for passenger cars developed by ZF.
- 2005: The 10-millionth airbag casing, the 5-millionth passenger car axle system and the 2-millionth 'Servolectric' electric power steering system are delivered.
- 2006: ZF produces the 10-millionth passenger car automatic transmission.
- 2007: One of the world's first 8-speed automatic transmissions, the 8HP boasted to achieve an 11% improvement in fuel economy in comparison with standard 6-speed automatic transmissions. Production began in 2009.
- 2008: Acquisition of keyboard manufacturers Cherry Corporation. Incorporated into the ZF Electronics GmbH Corporate Division.
- 2011: World premiere for the first automatic 9-speed transmission.. Land Rover demonstrated the world's first nine-speed automatic transmission for a passenger car at the 2013 Geneva Motor Show. The ZF 9HP transmission is designed for transverse applications, and is one of the most efficient and technically advanced transmissions ever used in a production vehicle. Land Rover is the lead partner with ZF on this project.
- 2013: Jeep announces that ZF has developed a nine-speed automatic transmission for use in its all-new 2014 Jeep Cherokee (KL) midsized crossover utility vehicle.
- 2013: ZF Opens automatic passenger car transmission plant in Gray Court, South Carolina, U.S.
- 2014: American auto parts manufacturer TRW Automotive acquired for $13.5 billion.
- 2015: Acquired the Bosch Rexroth industrial gears and wind turbine gearbox unit (formerly Lohmann & Stolterfoht).
- 2019: ZF acquires occupant recognition software maker Simi Reality Motion Systems.
- 2019: ZF acquires auto part manufacturer WABCO.
- 2019: ZF to provide the entire electric powertrain of Mercedes-Benz EQC.
- 2020: ZF completes acquisition of WABCO, which will be integrated into ZF as its Commercial Vehicle Control Systems Division.
- 2022: ZF and Wolfspeed announced a joint R&D center in Germany to accelerate global Silicon Carbide system and device top innovation. ZF intends to invest in Wolfspeed, in order to support construction of the world's most advanced and largest Silicon Carbide device fab. The partnership also includes a significant investment by ZF to support the planned construction of the world's most advanced and largest 200 mm Silicon Carbide device fab in Ensdorf.
- 2023: ZF and Hon Hai Technology Group ("Foxconn") announced a 50-50 partnership in passenger car chassis systems, a key move aimed at accelerating and expanding automotive and supply chain opportunities with top-tier customers. Foxconn will acquire a 50-percent stake in ZF Chassis Modules GmbH.
- 2025: It was announced ZF would sell its passenger-car ADAS business to Harman International—the auto-component and audio subsidiary of Samsung—for €1.5 billion as part of a strategic realignment. The divestment covered driver assistance hardware and software activities, while ZF retained chassis electronics, passive safety technologies, and ADAS development for commercial vehicles.

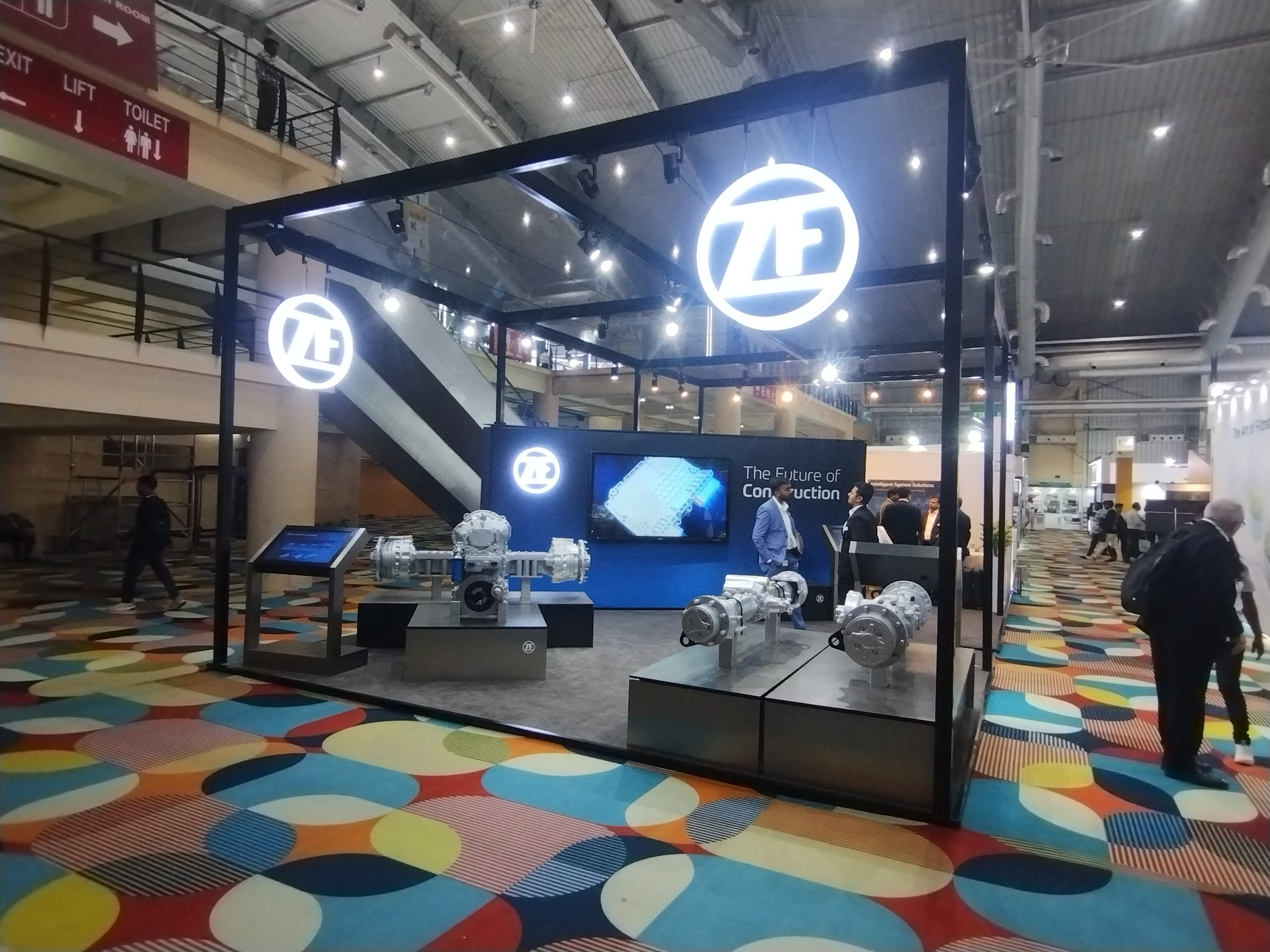
ZF at EXCON 2025, BIEC

- 2026: ZF acquired a 6% stake in Stradvision, a South Korean developer of perception software for autonomous driving systems. The investment was intended to support ZF's development of advanced driver assistance and higher-level automated driving technologies, with financial terms of the transaction not disclosed.

== Products ==
ZF supplies components, systems and software for road vehicles and industrial equipment. Its products include:

- Drivetrains: automatic and hybrid transmissions, including the 8HP, as well as manual transmissions for commercial vehicles. For electric vehicles, ZF supplies motors, inverters and transmissions as individual components or integrated drive systems.
- Chassis systems: steering and braking systems, control arms, ball joints and tie rods, and suspension products such as the electronically controlled Continuous Damping Control (CDC) system. ZF also supplies steer-by-wire systems and cubiX software, which coordinates steering, braking and damping functions.
- Safety and electronics: driver-assistance systems and sensors, together with airbags, seat belts and steering wheels supplied through ZF Lifetec.
- Industrial equipment: transmissions and axles for agricultural and construction machinery, marine and rail drive equipment, wind-turbine gearboxes and test systems.

== Divisions ==
In 2025, ZF operated through seven divisions.

Division	Main products and activities	Sales (€ million)
Chassis Solutions	Steering, braking, suspension and electronic control of vehicle dynamics	9,629
Electrified Powertrain Technology	Transmissions, hybrid powertrains, electric motors, power electronics and electric drive systems	10,067
ZF Lifetec	Airbags, seat belts and steering wheels	4,664
Electronics and ADAS	Driver-assistance systems, sensors and integrated electronics	2,633
Commercial Vehicle Solutions	Transmissions, electric drives, braking, steering and driver-assistance systems for trucks, buses and trailers	7,822
Industrial Technology	Transmissions, axles and drive systems for construction and agricultural machinery, wind turbines, ships and rail vehicles	3,237
Aftermarket	Replacement parts, maintenance, remanufacturing and services for workshops and vehicle fleets	3,514

Corporate activities and consolidation adjustments account for the difference between divisional sales and group sales.

== See also ==
- List of ZF transmissions
