= Sibylle Pfeiffer =

German politician

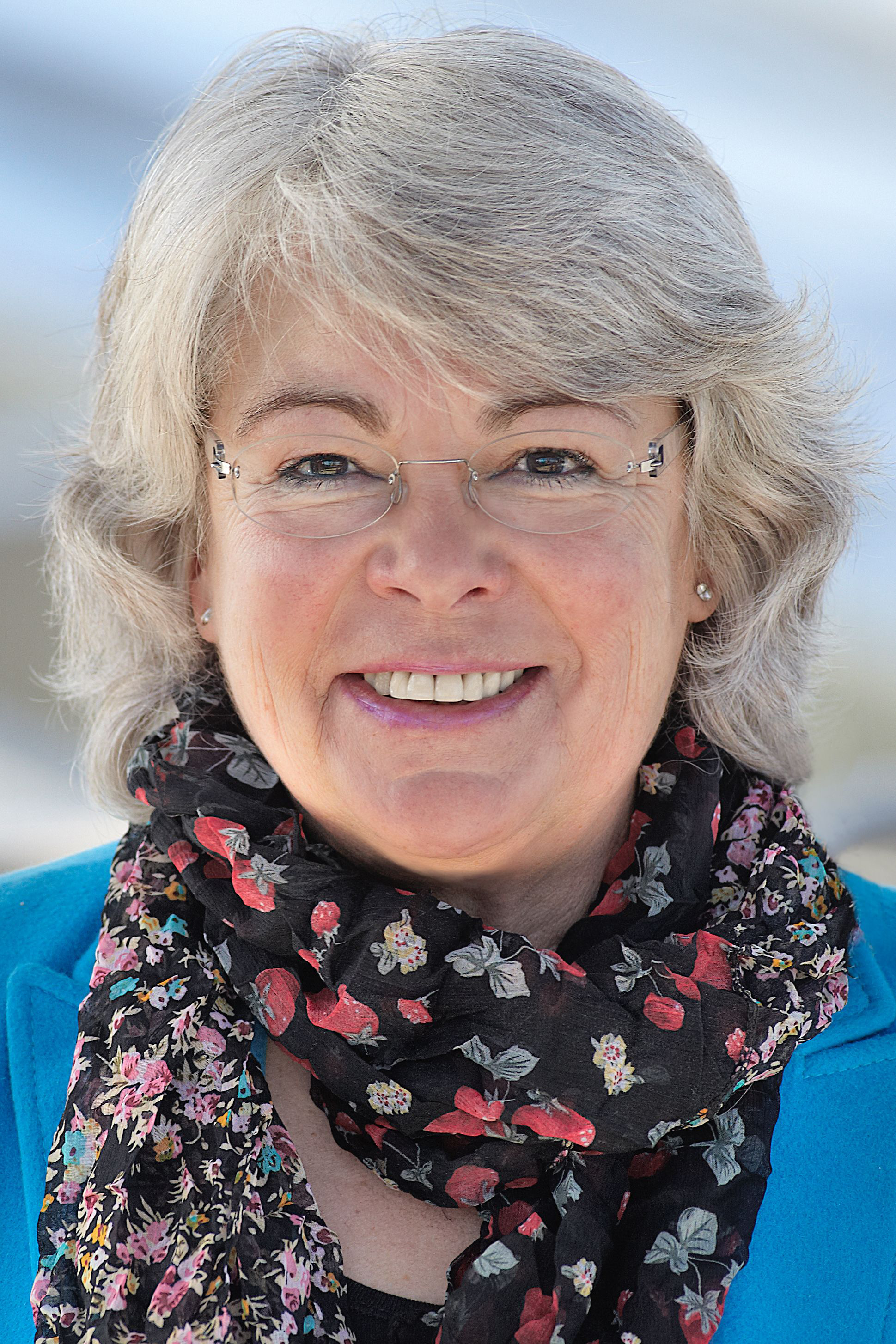
- Pfeiffer in 2013

Member of the Bundestag; from Hesse
- In office 17 October 2002 – 24 October 2017
- Preceded by: Multi-member district
- Succeeded by: Hans-Jürgen Irmer
- Constituency: State list (2002–2009); Lahn-Dill (2009–2017)

Personal details
- Born: Sibylle Schmidt; 16 October 1951 (age 74) Wetzlar, West Germany
- Party: Christian Democratic Union
- Children: 2
- Website: sibylle-pfeiffer.de

Sibylle Pfeiffer (born Sibylle Schmidt; 16 October 1951) is a German former politician. A member of the Christian Democratic Union of Germany, she served in the Bundestag from 2002 to 2017.
