= Bert Twaalfhoven =

Dutch businessman (1928–2023)

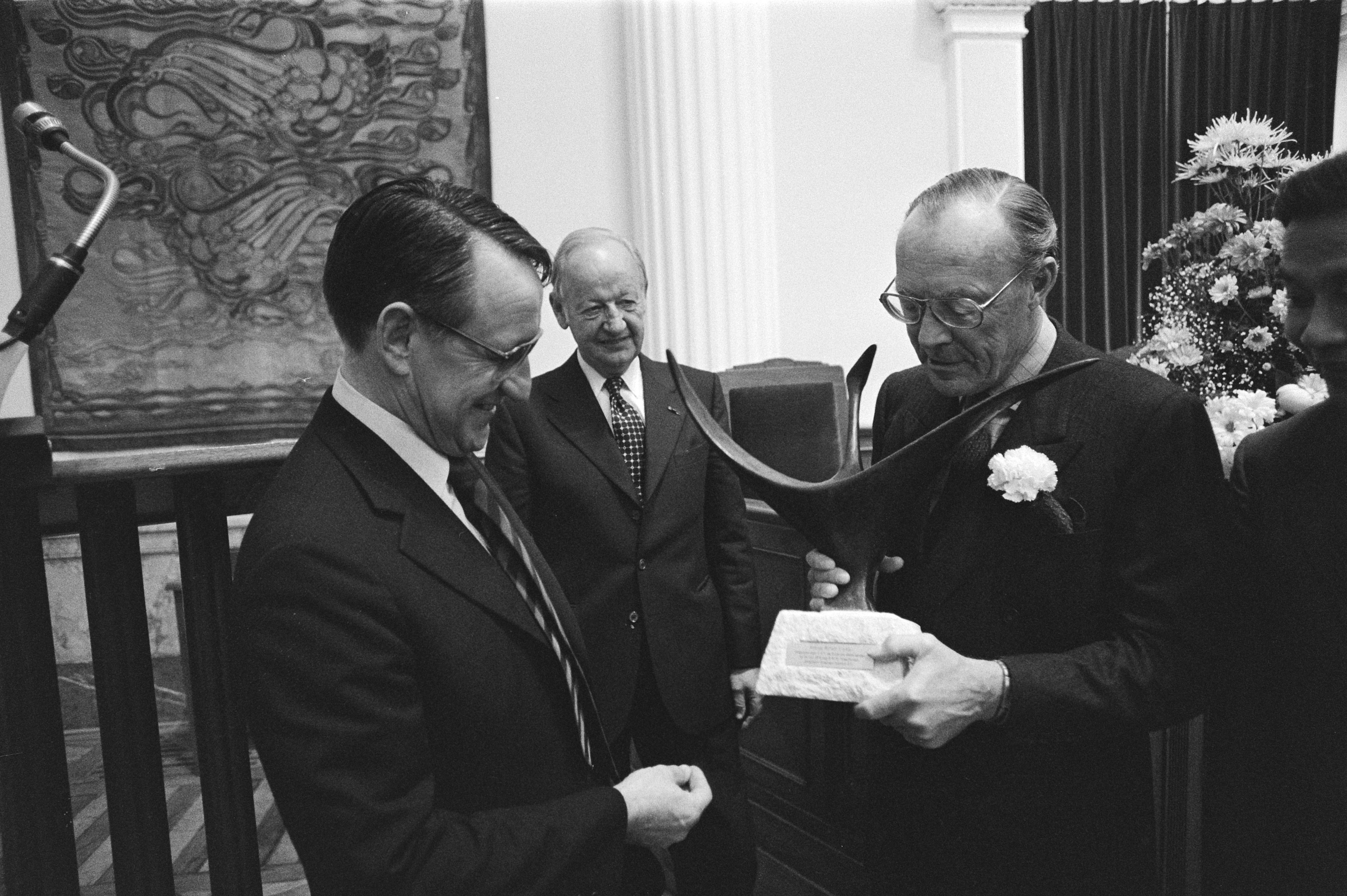
Twaalfhoven (l) receives the Willem I Prize from Bernhard of Lippe-Biesterfeld, 1978

Bert W. M. Twaalfhoven (13 August 1928 – 22 November 2023) was a Dutch businessman and venture capitalist from Hilversum.

== Early life and education ==
Twaalfhoven was born and raised in The Hague (Den Haag), the Netherlands. His teenage years were disrupted by World War II, during which his home was bombed and his mother injured. In 1947 Twaalfhoven graduated from the high school Aloysius College, in The Hague. He moved to the United States of America in the summer of 1948. Twaalfhoven received a scholarship at Fordham University in New York, and worked as a dishwasher, waiter, chauffeur and fruit-picker during the four years of his education. He was on the International Soccer team at Fordham University as well.

In 1952 Twaalfhoven graduated with a Bachelor of Science from Fordham, and was awarded a scholarship at the University of Harvard, and graduated there in 1954 with an MBA.

== Career in business ==
In 1957 Twaalfhoven worked on Wall Street, New York to gain experience in the financial industry. Using money inherited by his wife, he purchased a farm in Quebec with 120 cows. Twaalfhoven used the then unknown method of Artificial Insemination, and in five years raised cows that increased milk production by 100%.

Twaalfhoven's sold the farm in 1958 and moved his family to Hilversum, The Netherlands, where he started a business, setting up the first laundromats in northwestern Europe.

In 1993 Twaalfhoven received an honorary doctorate from the Fordham University for his achievements in the area of education and as an international entrepreneur. In 2001 he received the Annual Alumni Award from Harvard Business School for his activities stimulating entrepreneurship in Eastern and Western Europe. He has been a chairman of Harvard Business School Alumni.

Through his company Indivers B.V., Twaalfhoven started 54 businesses in the countries Italy, France, Germany, Russia, Ukraine, Holland, Belgium, England, U.S.A., Singapore and China. Of these businesses, 17 failed. Twaalfhoven was the co-founder of the first venture capital company in The Netherlands, known as Gilde.

Some of the businesses Twaalfhoven founded include:

- Indivers B.V.
- European Forum (Foundation) for Entrepreneurship Research (EFER)
- Aluminium Extruders Harderwijk (later Reynolds and now Alcoa
- Interturbine Group
- Europe's 500
- Wasserette (Laundromats) - The Netherlands, Germany, Switzerland and Belgium
- Ribby Dry Cleaning
- Autowasserette (Car wash) - The Netherlands and Belgium
- MIFA
- Almax - The Netherlands, France, Italy, UK
- Danvers Seals
- Dayton Process
- Elbar - Argentina, Boston, Hickham, The Netherlands, Poland, Singapore, Wood
- Eldim (later known as Sulzer Eldim B.V.) - Boston, The Netherlands

Twaalfhoven published his own book, Learn Earn Return: The Journey of a Global Entrepreneur, in April 2013 through EFER.

== Maps ==
Twaalfhoven was a collector of 16th, 17th and 18th century maps, and has donated 22 of these to Fordham University Libraries.

== Personal life and death ==
Twaalfhoven married Maria Somary in Zurich, Switzerland in 1954. The couple moved in 1955 to Town of Mount Royal, Montreal, Canada, where their first two children were born. A third child was born in 1958 while the family was living in Long Island, NY. Five more children were born after the family moved to the Netherlands. Twaalfhoven and his wife formed the first parent-teacher organizations in North Holland. Maria Somary Twaalfhoven died on 7 February 2020 in Bilthoven, the Netherlands.

Bert Twaalfhoven died on 22 November 2023, at the age of 95.
