= Zeppelin (iPod speaker system) =

Group of speaker systems

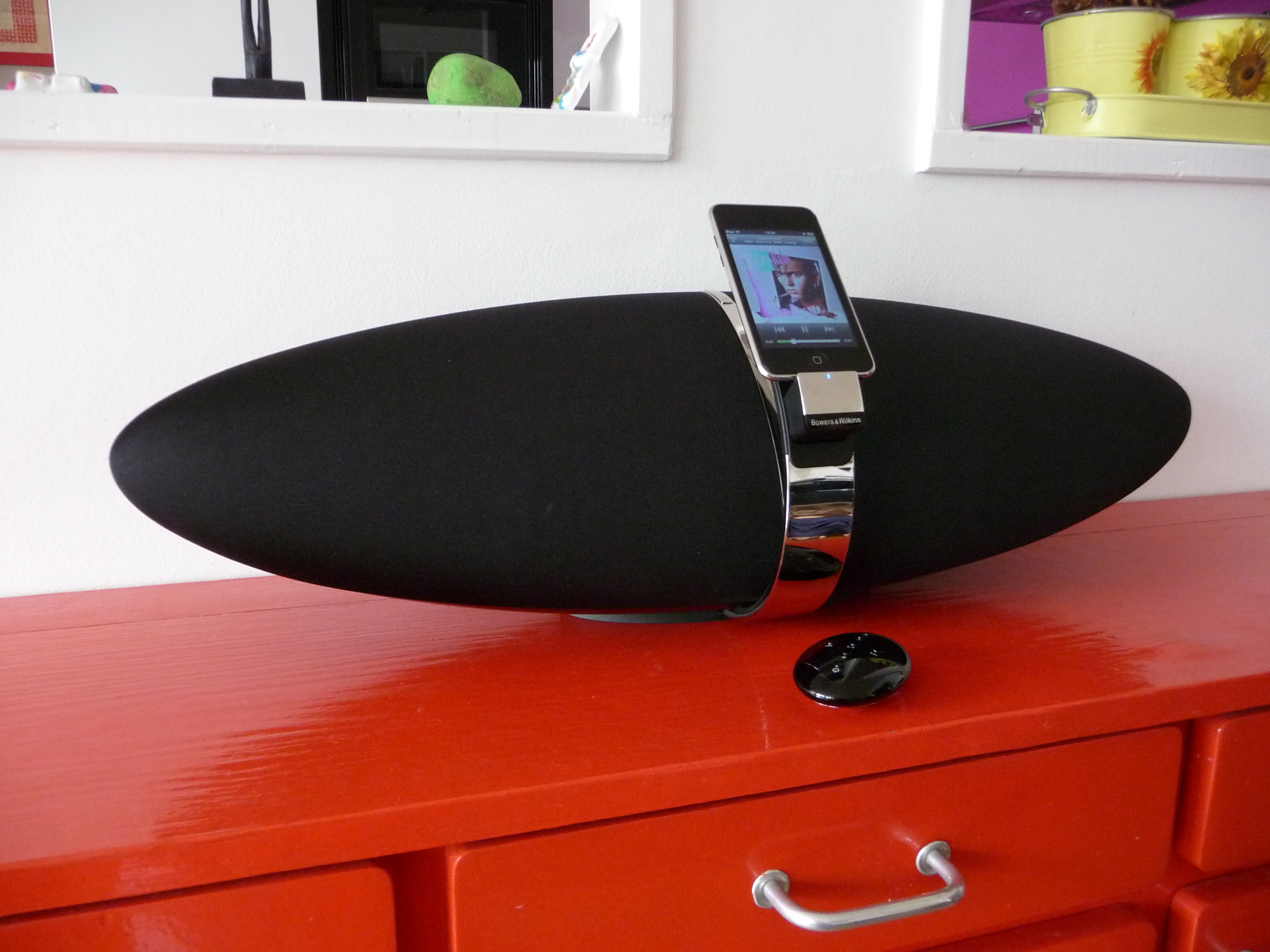
Bowers & Wilkins Zeppelin

The Zeppelin is a group of speaker systems sold, designed, and manufactured by the English audio company Bowers & Wilkins for use with the iPod. The original speaker, the Zeppelin, was on sale from 2006-2011. WhatHiFi considered that it "set the benchmark for premium iPod speaker docks".

The device has now been updated, and renamed the Zeppelin Air. It received substantial reviews by PC magazine, which rated it "excellent", and from What HiFi. The firm also uses the Zeppelin brand to market the Zeppelin Mini, which was reviewed by PCmag, and What HiFi, in connection with their Zeppelin Air reviews. What HiFi said that "despite its smaller stature, there was no dip in sound quality."

== Units compared ==
=== Input/Output ===
Device	Dock Connector	3.5mm Analogue Audio	USB	Airplay (WiFi Audio)	S Video Output	Composite Video	Ethernet
Zeppelin	Yes	Yes	Updates Only (No Audio)	No	Yes	Yes	No
Zeppelin Mini	Yes	Yes	Updates And Audio	No	No	No	No
Zeppelin Air	Yes	Yes	Updates And Audio	Yes	No	Yes	Yes

=== Audio ===
Device	Subwoofers	Midrange Drivers	Tweeters	Audio Enhancing Design Features	Total output Power (Watts)
Zeppelin	1	2	2	Front mounted Speakers, with minimal surround casing	150
Zeppelin Mini		2 Driver Total		Internal DAC.	90
Zeppelin Air	1	2	2	Internal DAC. Discrete amplification for each speaker.	200

Weaknesses

Low end Chinese capacitors were used in these units which meant a shortened life especially in the built in power supplies. The sealed units would hold heat that the internal power supply capacitors could not tolerate. Malfunctioning Wi-Fi board would also render the units inoperable.

Wi-Fi uses early generation 2ghz protocol which often do not play nice with modern modems.
