= Eberhard von Zeppelin =

German historian and banker (1842 - 1906)

Eberhard Moritz Adolph Albert Graf von Zeppelin (22 May 1842 - 30 October 1906) was a German historian, banker, hotelier, author, and ambassador of Württemberg.

== Selected publications ==
His publications include:

- Geschichte der Dampfschifffahrt auf dem Bodensee 1824–1884: Separatabdruck aus dem 14. Hefte der „Schriften des Vereins für Geschichte des Bodensee's und seiner Umgebung“, Verlag Johann Thomas Stettner, Lindau 1885
- Der Konstanzer Vertrag Kaiser Friedrichs I. Barbarossa von 1153, Lindau 1887
- Urkunden-Regesten aus dem Gräfl. Douglas'schen Archiv zu Schloss Langenstein im Hegau, Lindau 1889–90
- Ältere und neuere Bodensee-Forschungen, mit Jakob Hörnlimann und Robert Reber, Verlag Stettner, Lindau 1893
- Bodensee-Forschungen, Verlag Stettner, Lindau 1893
- Geographische Verhältnisse des Bodensees, Verlag Stettner, Lindau 1893
- Die hydrologischen Verhältnisse des Bodensees, Verlag Stettner, Lindau 1893
- Die Schwankungen des Bodensees, mit François-Alphonse Forel, Verlag Stettner, Lindau 1893
- Die Temperatur-Verhältnisse des Bodensees, mit Francois Alphonse Forel, Verlag Stettner, Lindau 1893
- Transparenz und Farbe des Bodenseewassers, mit Francois Alphonse Forel, Verlag Stettner, Lindau 1893
- Das Bad im Bild, illustrierter Führer zur Hebung des Fremdenverkehrs in Städten, Bädern, Kurorten und Heil-Anstalten des In- und Auslandes, Verlag Weltbad, Frankfurt a. M. ca. 1912.
