= Dagmar Schmidt =

German historian and politician

Dagmar Schmidt MdB
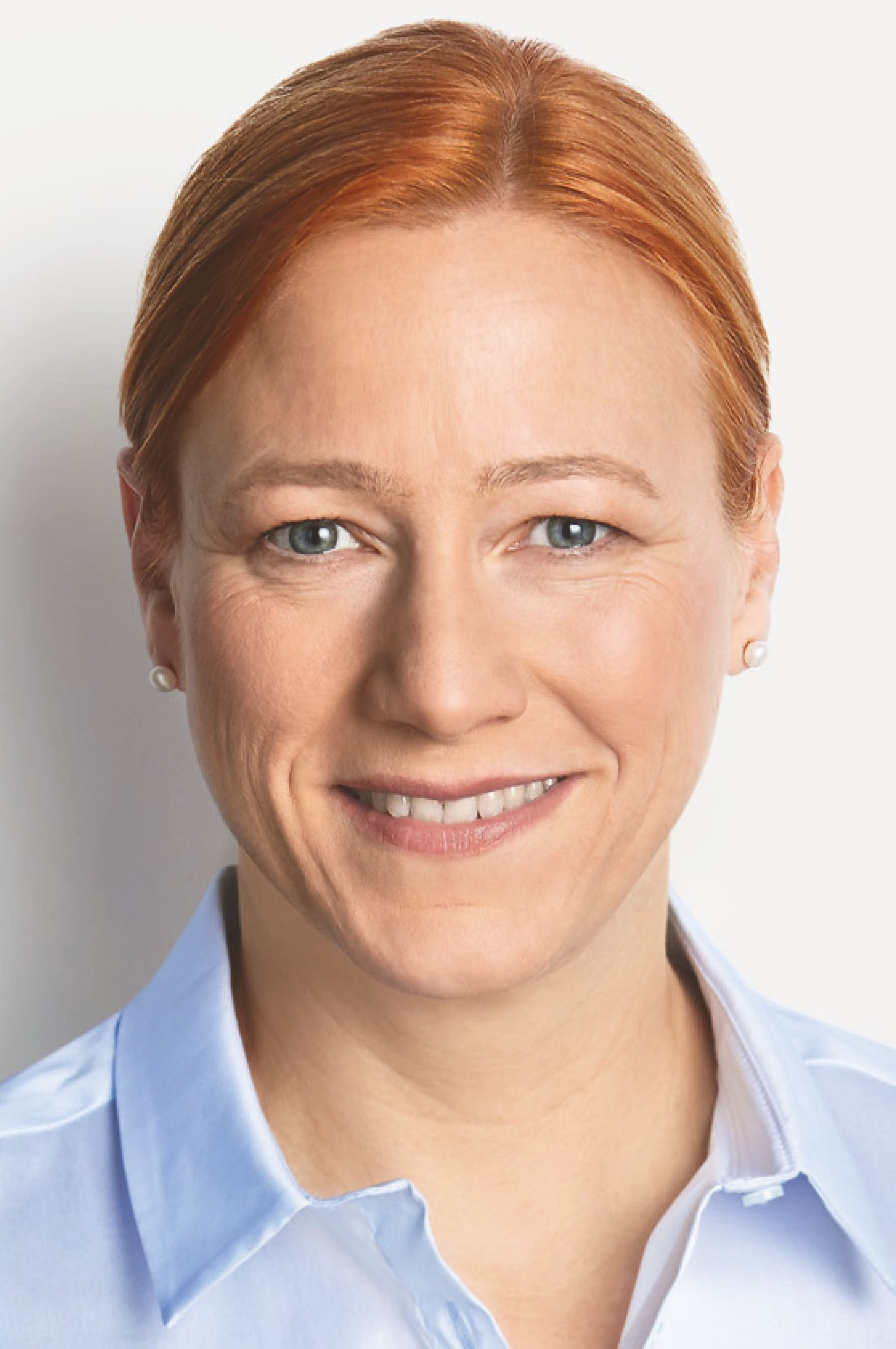
- Schmidt in 2017

Member of the Bundestag; from Hesse
- Incumbent
- Assumed office 22 October 2013
- Constituency: State list (2013–2021); Lahn-Dill (2021–2025); State list (2025–present)

Personal details
- Born: 13 March 1973 (age 53) Giessen, West Germany
- Party: Social Democratic
- Children: 1
- Education: University of Giessen

Dagmar Schmidt (born 13 March 1973) is a German politician of the Social Democratic Party (SPD) who has been serving as a member of the Bundestag, the German parliament, since 2013.

== Early life and education ==
Schmidt was born in Giessen to politically active parents, who were SPD members. After her Abitur, she studied history at the University of Giessen.

== Early career ==
While she was preparing a PhD thesis about the history of the SPD, Schmidt was offered a job in the office of Landtag of Hesse member Andrea Ypsilanti. She continued as Ypsilanti's assistant when Ypsilanti became state SPD leader, and later became an assistant to her successor, Thorsten Schäfer-Gümbel.

== Political career ==
Schmidt became a SPD member when she was 16. As a Juso member, she acted as an observer in the 1995–96 South African municipal elections.

In the 2009 and 2013 federal elections, Schmidt was the SPD candidate for the Lahn-Dill electoral district, losing out to the CDU candidate each time. However, in 2013, placed sixth on the SPD party list for Hesse, she was elected to the Bundestag. She also became a member of the SPD executive committee. In 2017, she was re-elected, placed fourth on the SPD list for Hesse. She has since been serving on the Committee on Labor and Social Affairs.

Within the SPD parliamentary group, Schmidt is a leading member of the left-wing group Parlamentarische Linke.

In addition to her committee assignments, Schmidt has been serving as the chair of the German-Chinese Parliamentary Friendship Group since 2014. In this capacity, she has met with senior Chinese political advisors like CPPCC vice chair Gao Yunlong.

Since 2021, Schmidt has been serving as one her parliamentary group's deputy chairs, under the leadership of chairman Rolf Mützenich.

In the negotiations to form a Grand Coalition under the leadership of Friedrich Merz's Christian Democrats (CDU together with the Bavarian CSU) and the SPD following the 2025 German elections, Schmidt was part of the SPD delegation in the working group on labour and social affairs, led by Carsten Linnemann, Stephan Stracke and Katja Mast.

== Political positions ==
Schmidt’s political positions include support for Kindergrundsicherung, combining and extending existing benefits and subsidies to guarantee a child's right to have a certain minimum standard of living.

== Personal life ==
Dagmar Schmidt has a son, who was born in May 2013 with Down syndrome and an associated heart defect, which required several corrective surgeries. The child was not diagnosed until shortly after his birth; Schmidt had declined prenatal testing, stating that knowing about the condition would not change anything. After the German federal election in September 2013, Schmidt became the first single mother of a child with Down syndrome to become a member of the Bundestag. In a speech in a Bundestag debate about prenatal diagnostics she supported a "Willkommenskultur for all children". In relation to prenatal testing, she has also argued for a "right not to know" and has said that parents of children with trisomy 21 should not have to justify the right for their child to be born.

== Other activities ==
- Business Forum of the Social Democratic Party of Germany, Member of the Political Advisory Board (since 2020)
- IG Metall, Member
- German United Services Trade Union (ver.di), Member
- Pro Asyl, Member
