= Zeppelin University =

Private university in Friedrichshafen, Germany

- Zeppelin Universität
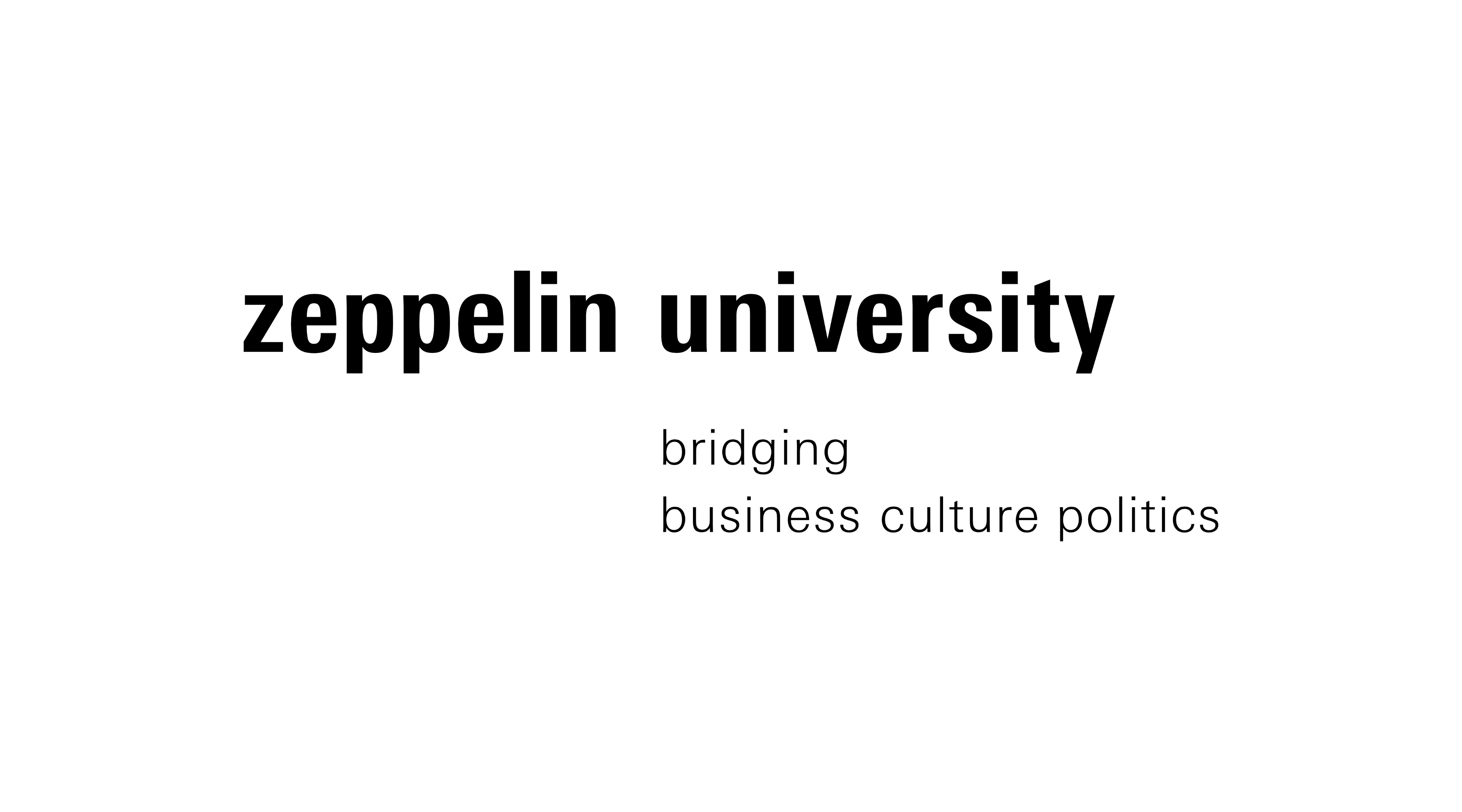
- Motto: "Bridging Business, Culture and Politics"
- Type: Private – Research
- Established: June 2003; 23 years ago
- Affiliations: AACSB, EFMD, TPC, IBH
- President: Anja Achtziger
- Administrative staff: 262 (2022)
- Students: 842 (2022)
- Location: Friedrichshafen, Baden-Württemberg, Germany; 47°39′31″N 9°26′02″E
- Campus: Lake Campus, FN ZF Campus, FN
- Professors: 29 (2022)
- Colors: Red or grey
- Mascot: ZUbra
- Website: www.zu.de

Zeppelin University (German: Zeppelin Universität, ZU) is a private research university in Friedrichshafen, Germany. The university is accredited by the Ministry of Science, Research and the Arts of Baden-Württemberg. The university was established in 2003 and is known for its avant-garde character as well as for its sophisticated method of selecting students. It is named after the German general and airship constructor Ferdinand Graf von Zeppelin, whose foundation is a prominent financier of the university.

== Campus ==
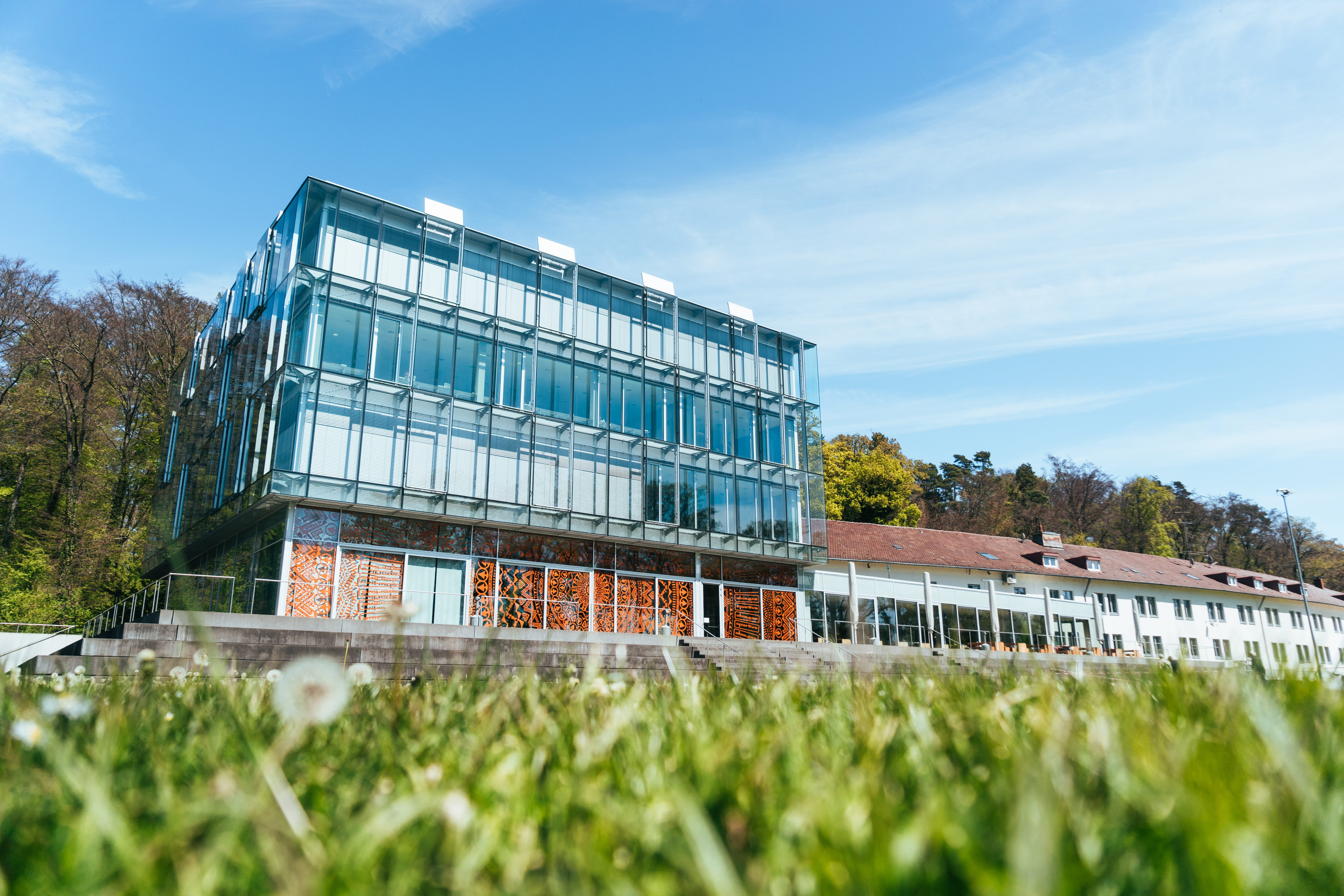
The SeeCampus directly on the shore of Lake Constance

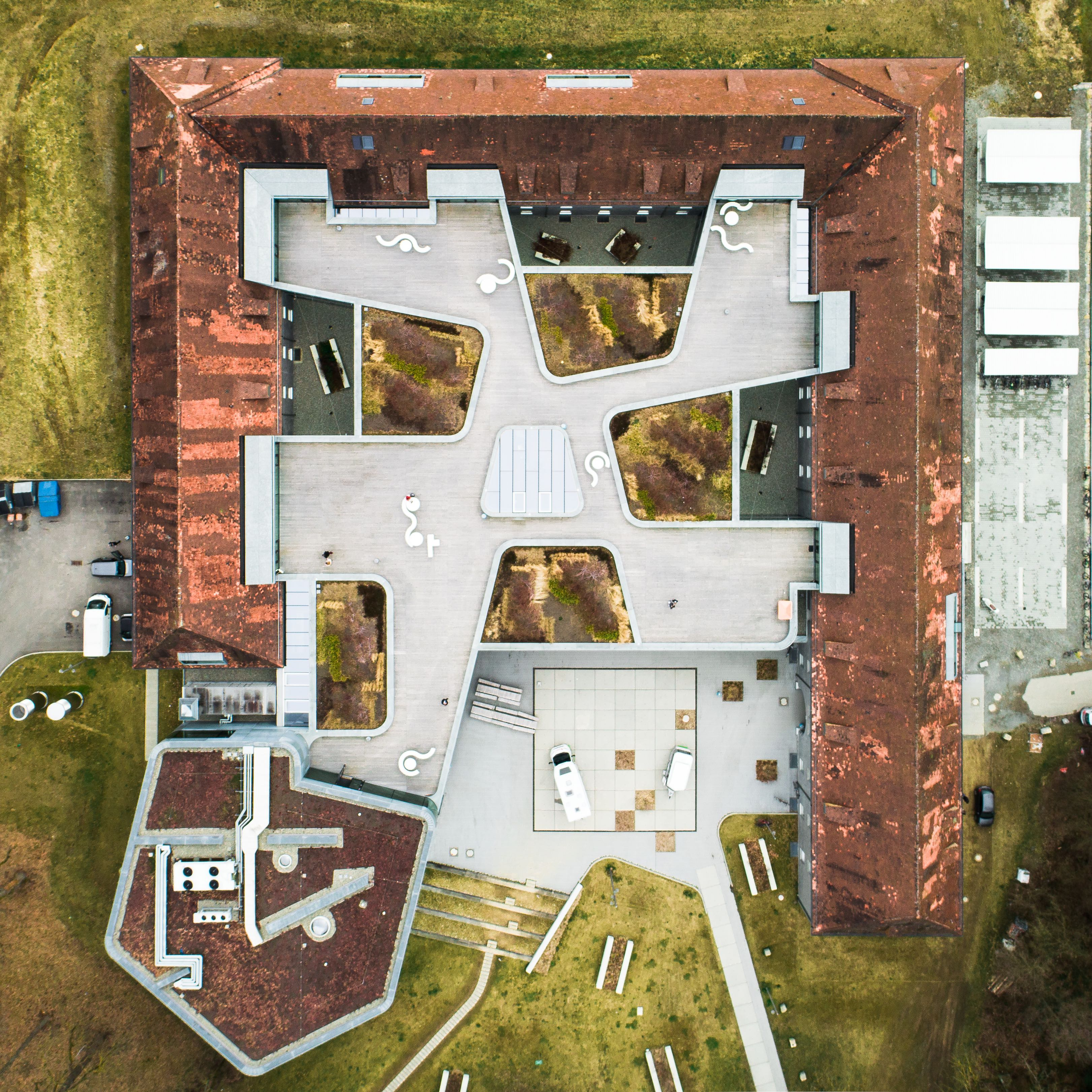
The ZF Campus, which is awarded for its architecture

Zeppelin University has two campuses in Friedrichshafen: the Lake Campus at the shores of Lake Constance, and the nearby ZF Campus, which was completed in 2015. The ZF Campus was funded by a donation of 20 million Euro from ZF Friedrichshafen. Both campuses are modern, and are designed by well-known architects, and contain classrooms, lecture halls, offices, cafeterias, a library, a fitness studio, and a co-working wing for students.

In 2018, the ZF Campus was named one of four new exceptional buildings in Germany by the German Architecture Museum. The university was also awarded with the "Deutscher Hochschulbaupreis 2018" by the Deutsche Universitätsstiftung.

== Rankings ==
In the CHE Ranking, which annually ranks German universities and is published in the Zeit newspaper's study guide, Zeppelin University appeared among the best of all German universities for its teaching offerings and the general study situation.

== Academic profile ==
The university offers eight Bachelor's and Master's tracks, mainly in social sciences and humanities, including an Executive Master of Science in Management. Unlike the usual practice in Germany, the Bachelor's degree at ZU lasts eight semesters instead of six and comprises 240 ECTS-credits (instead of 180).

Following the self-imposed aim of upholding the Humboldtian model of higher education, the university stresses the importance of research and interdisciplinarity. Hence, already in the first year of the Bachelor's program, a joint research project ("Zeppelin Project") must be completed. In the sixth and seventh semesters – the so-called "Humboldt Year" – there is another possibility to carry out a student research project funded by the university. Moreover, all students must complete compulsory courses from the other taught disciplines during the first two semesters. High-achieving students (with an overall grade of better than 2.0) have the opportunity to choose additional elective courses from the other degree programs in order to aim for an additional Minor degree.

The university generally does not teach in lectures, but rather in seminar groups of up to 40 people. Students can also initiate their own courses on self-selected topics. The student-to-faculty ratio is 1:9.

=== Partner universities ===
One year of the undergraduate program is intended to be spent at a partner university. To enable this, the university's academic calendar closely mirrors international academic calendars. Zeppelin University has partnerships with around 85 universities, some of which are:

- University of California, Berkeley
- Sciences Po
- Copenhagen Business School
- University of Twente
- Goldsmiths College
- Maastricht University

=== Tuition fees and scholarships ===
Tuition for undergraduate programs in the nominal study period of four years cost between 36,720 and 42,000 euros. For postgraduate programs, the tuition costs between 13,320 and 23,160 euros for the two-year program.

Students not in receipt of a scholarship are offered low interest loans by Sparkasse Bodensee. At the school, more than two-thirds of students utilize such loans. Alternatively, students can apply for grants from ZU-Bildungsfonds.

=== Selection process ===
Applicants are selected by the university in a two-step selection process: after a detailed written application, in which the first round of selection is made, candidates are invited to an assessment day (Pioneers Wanted). Candidates go through several interviews with professors, students, alumni, and external reviewers. Written tests are also featured. Candidates have to complete a group project which is presented to the assessment committee.

== Engagement and student projects ==
There are some 59 student groups and projects, such as groups affiliated with political parties (LHG, Jusos, RCDS), a debating club (Soapbox), the Club of International Politics (CIP), a Model United Nations group (MUN), which also organizes LakeMun, entrepreneurial groups, a cultural club which also organizes a music festival at the university (SeeKult), a student medical service (ZUFA), a film group, several bands and many more – some of them are even known nationally (RockYourLife, for example). A student radio station, Welle20, went on air in 2008. In the last few years new initiatives have emerged for example the "ZUtaten" career fair, or the student consulting group "Whyknot". There is also an ERASMUS group named "International Student Group" and the "Hochschulsport" club which organises several sport activities such as volleyball, cheerleading, lacrosse, and rowing.

Since 2003, more than 120 companies have been founded at the university. Besides ZU itself, also the craft company J. Wagner has a business incubator at the university's start-up center.

== Research institutes ==
The Zeppelin University has various integrated interdisciplinary research institutes, which are partly funded by donations. These include the Leadership Excellence Institute Zeppelin (LEIZ), which is supported by the Karl Schlecht Stiftung, the Friedrichshafener Institut für Familienunternehmen (Institute for family business), the Forschungszentrum für Verbraucher, Markt und Politik (a research institute for consumers, markets and politics), and the European Center for Sustainability Research supported by Audi and Rolls-Royce Power Systems.
