= Nude (art) =

Artwork focused on the unclothed human body

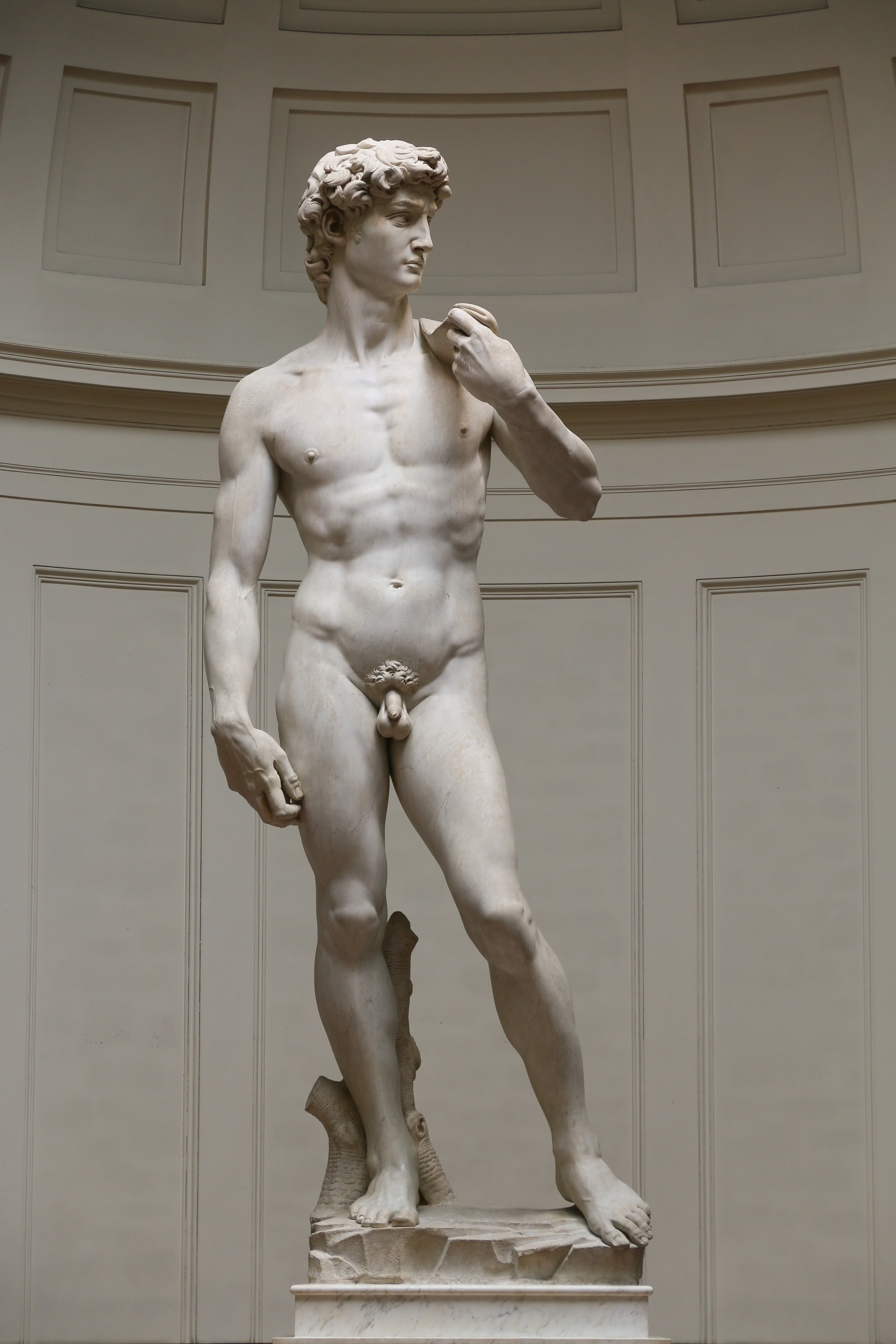
David (1504) "And what barbarous judge is there that cannot understand that the foot of a man is more noble than his shoe? His skin than that of the sheep from which his clothes are made?" — Michelangelo

The nude, as a form of visual art that focuses on the unclothed human figure, is an enduring tradition in Western art. It was a preoccupation of Ancient Greek art, and after a semi-dormant period in the Middle Ages returned to a central position with the Renaissance. Unclothed figures often also play a part in other types of art, such as history painting, including allegorical and religious art, portraiture, or the decorative arts. From prehistory to the earliest civilizations, nude female figures were generally understood to be symbols of fertility or well-being.

In India, the Khajuraho Group of Monuments built between 950 and 1050 CE are known for their nude sculptures, which comprise about 10% of the temple decorations, a minority of them being erotic. Japanese prints are one of the few non-Western traditions that can be called nudes, but the activity of communal bathing in Japan is portrayed as just another social activity, without the significance placed upon the lack of clothing that exists in the West. Through each era, the nude has reflected changes in cultural attitudes regarding sexuality, gender roles, and social structure.

One often cited book on the nude in art history is The Nude: a Study in Ideal Form by Kenneth Clark, first published in 1956. The introductory chapter makes (though does not originate) the often-quoted distinction between the naked body and the nude. Clark states that to be naked is to be deprived of clothes, and implies embarrassment and shame, while a nude, as a work of art, has no such connotations.

One of the defining characteristics of the modern era in art was the blurring of the line between the naked and the nude. This likely first occurred with the painting The Nude Maja (1797) by Goya, which in 1815 drew the attention of the Spanish Inquisition. The shocking elements were that it showed a particular model in a contemporary setting, with pubic hair rather than the smooth perfection of goddesses and nymphs, who returned the gaze of the viewer rather than looking away. Some of the same characteristics were shocking almost 70 years later when Manet exhibited his Olympia, not because of religious issues, but because of its modernity. Rather than being a timeless Odalisque that could be safely viewed with detachment, Manet's image was assumed to be of a prostitute of that time, perhaps referencing the male viewers' own sexual practices.

== Types of depiction ==
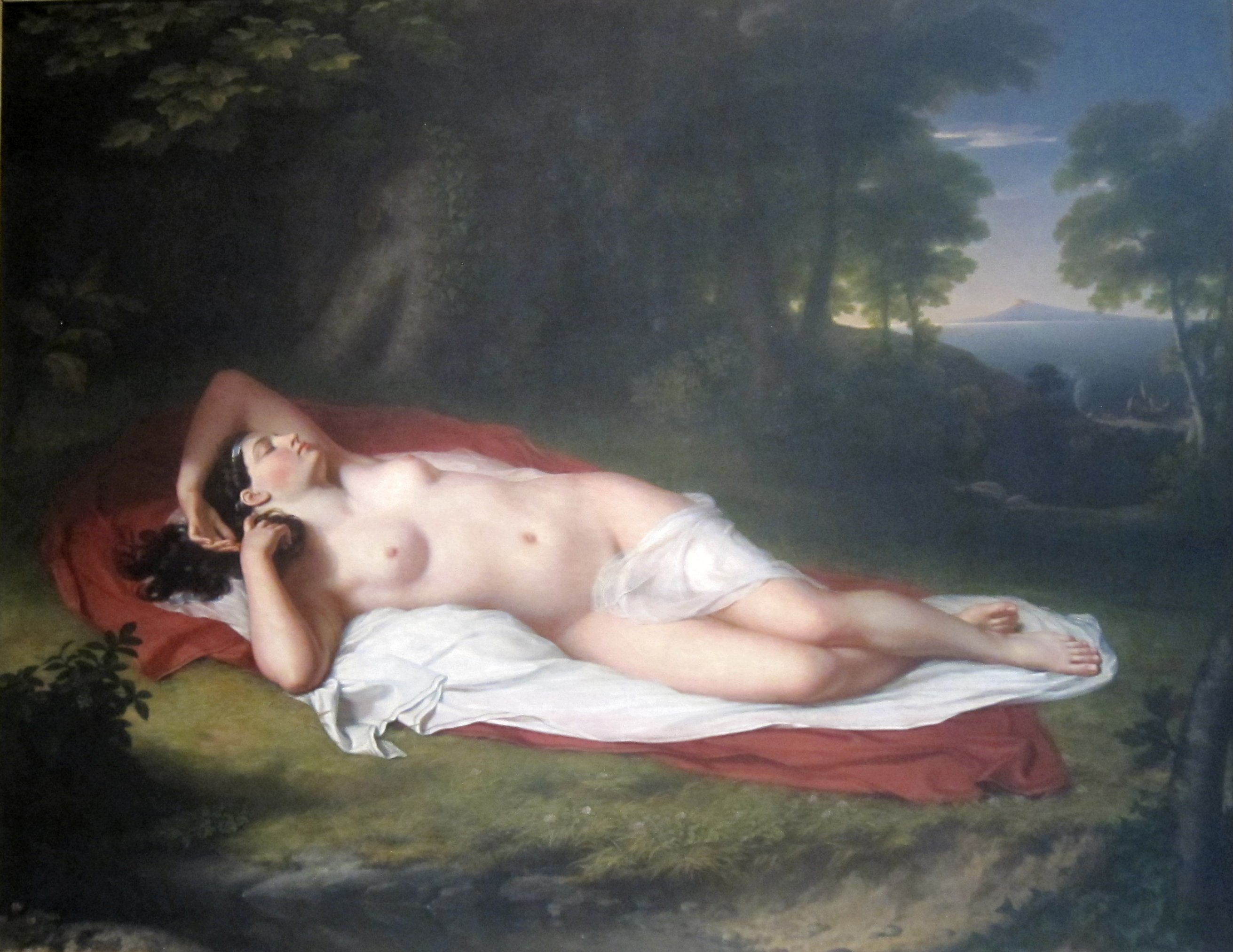
Ariadne Asleep on the Island of Naxos (1808–1812) by John Vanderlyn. The painting was initially considered too sexual for display in the Pennsylvania Academy of the Fine Arts. "Although nudity in art was publicly protested by Americans, Vanderlyn observed that they would pay to see pictures of which they disapproved."

The meaning of any image of the unclothed human body depends upon its being placed in a cultural context. In Western culture, the contexts generally recognized are art, pornography, and information. Viewers easily identify some images as belonging to one category, while other images are ambiguous. The 21st century may have created a fourth category, the commodified nude, which intentionally uses ambiguity to attract attention for commercial purposes.

With regard to the distinction between art and pornography, Kenneth Clark noted that sexuality was part of the attraction to the nude as a subject of art, stating "no nude, however abstract, should fail to arouse in the spectator some vestige of erotic feeling, even though it be only the faintest shadow—and if it does not do so it is bad art and false morals". According to Clark, the explicit temple sculptures of tenth-century India "are great works of art because their eroticism is part of their whole philosophy". Art can contain significant sexual content without being obscene.

However, in the United States nudity in art has sometimes been a controversial subject when public funding and display in certain venues brings the work to the attention of the general public. Puritan history continues to impact the selection of artwork shown in museums and galleries. At the same time that any nude may be suspect in the view of many patrons and the public, art critics may reject work that is not cutting edge. Relatively tame nudes tend to be shown in museums, while works with shock value are shown in commercial galleries. The art world has devalued simple beauty and pleasure, although these values are present in art from the past and in some contemporary works.

Art historian and author Frances Borzello writes that contemporary artists are no longer interested in the ideals and traditions of the past, but confront the viewer with all the sexuality, discomfort and anxiety that the unclothed body may express, perhaps eliminating the distinction between the naked and the nude. Performance art takes the final step by presenting actual naked bodies as a work of art.

== History ==
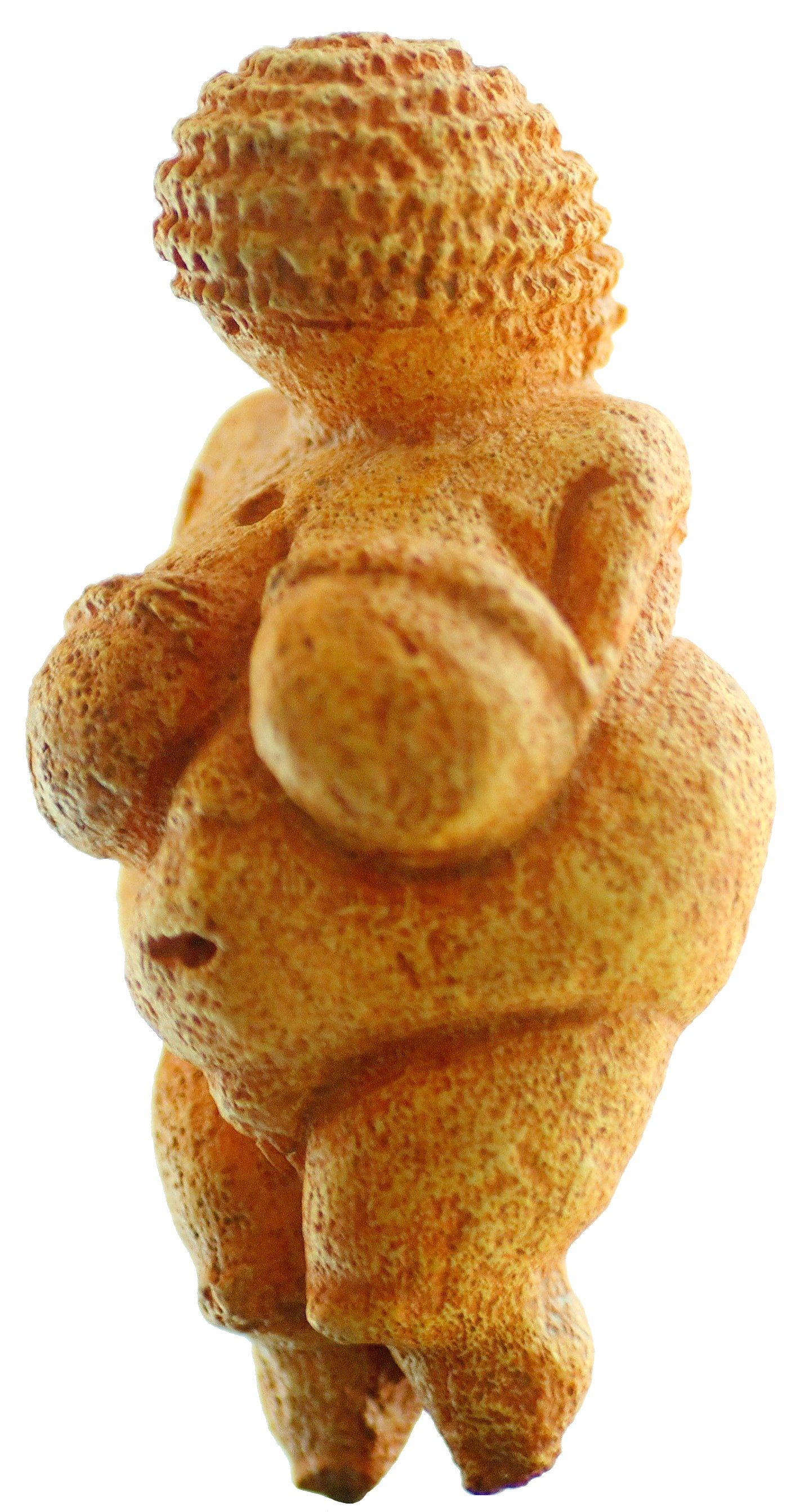
The Venus of Willendorf (made between 24,000 and 22,000 BCE)

The nude dates to the beginning of art with the female figures called Venus figurines from the Late Stone Age. In early historical times similar images represented fertility deities. When surveying the literature on the nude in art, there are differences between defining nakedness as the complete absence of clothing versus other states of undress. In early Christian art, particularly in references to images of Jesus, partial dress (a loincloth) was described as nakedness.

=== Mesopotamia and Ancient Egypt ===
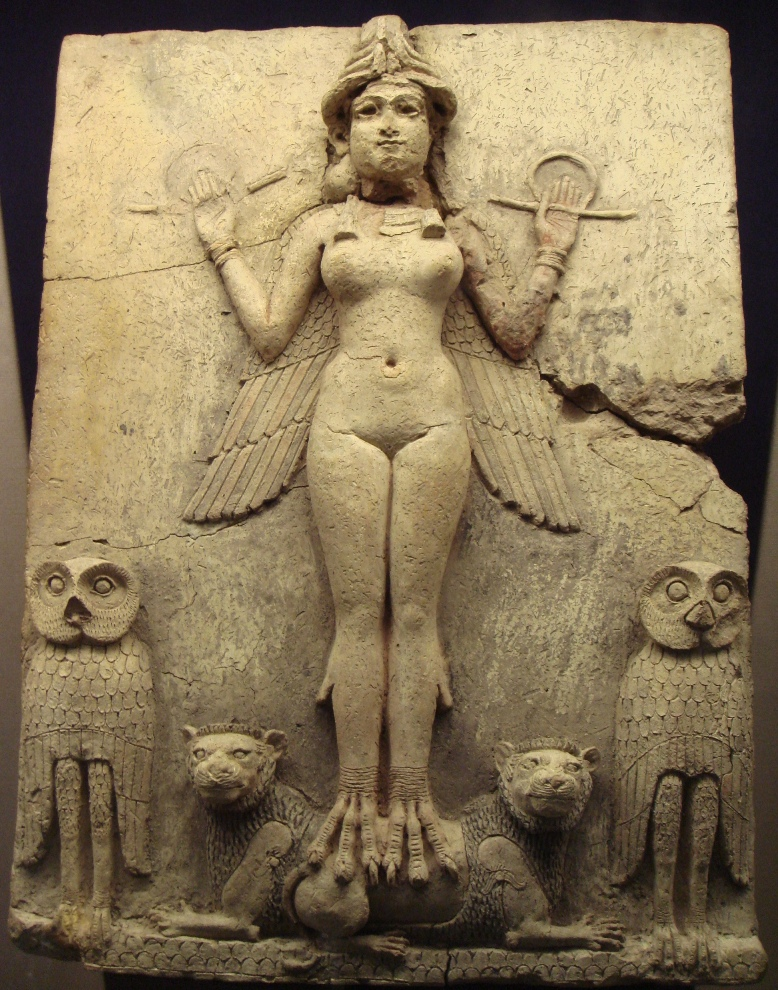
The Burney Relief, First Babylonian Dynasty (c. 1800 BCE)

Nude images in Mesopotamia and Ancient Egypt reflect the attitudes toward nudity in these societies. In Ancient Egypt the nude was depicted in sculptures as well as paintings and even hieroglyphs. The god min, the god of male fertility, is depicted nude when written as a hieroglyph. There are also nude images used as a distinction of class as often-times lower class citizens and slaves were made to do strenuous labor and hence were often nude. At the time, being naked in social situations was a source of great embarrassment for anyone with higher social status – this was not due to the connection between nudity and sexual impropriety, but rather it being indicative of low status or disgrace. Non-sexual, or functional nudity was common in early civilizations due to the climate. Children were generally naked until puberty, and public baths were attended nude by mixed gender groups. Those with low status – not only slaves – might be naked or, when clothed, would disrobe when necessary for strenuous work.

There is also evidence of nudity being used as a form of entertainment. Women often would be shown partially nude and dressed very minimally in what we would consider an early form of lingerie and these women would have been dancers, musicians, or acrobats.

The figure depicted in the Burney Relief could be the Mesopotamian underworld goddess Ereshkigal or goddess of sexual love and war Ishtar, in her aspect of Owl-goddess, Akkadian Kilili. However, the figure's bird-feet and accompanying owls have suggested to some a connection with lilitu or Lilith, which is disproved by modern scholarship.

The nude in Babylon and Egypt
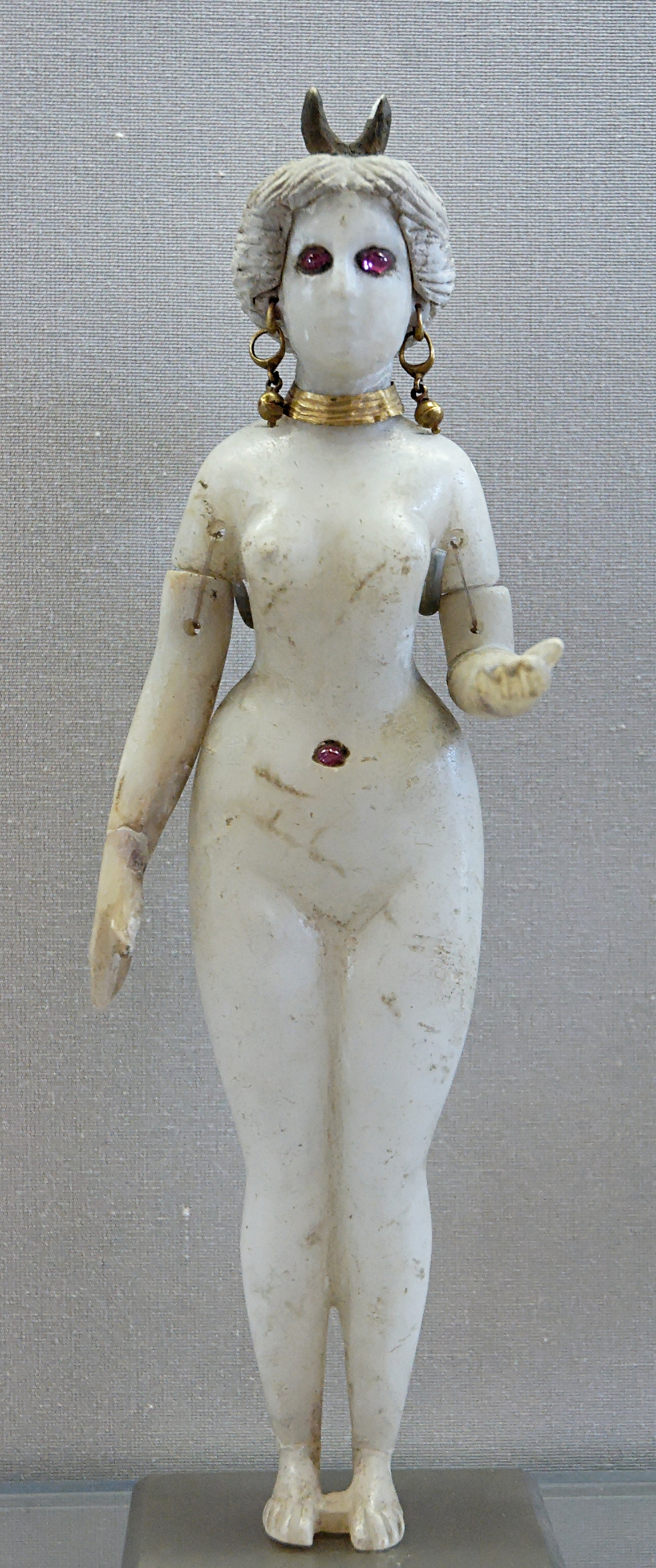
Babylonian statuette of a goddess (Astarte or Ishtar)

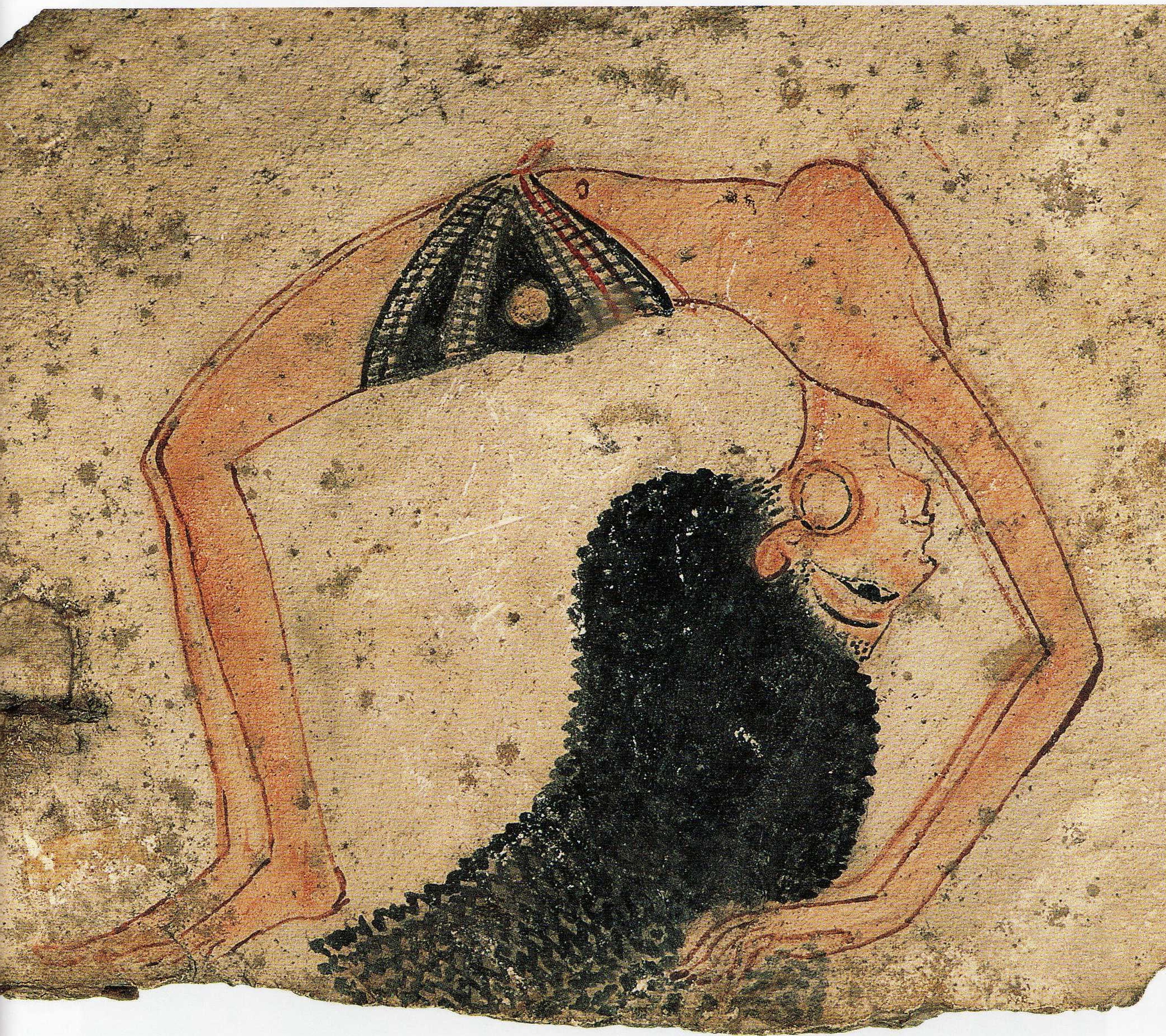
Ancient Egyptian depiction of topless dancer with elaborate hairstyle and hoop earrings in gymnastic backbend, on ostrakon (potsherd).

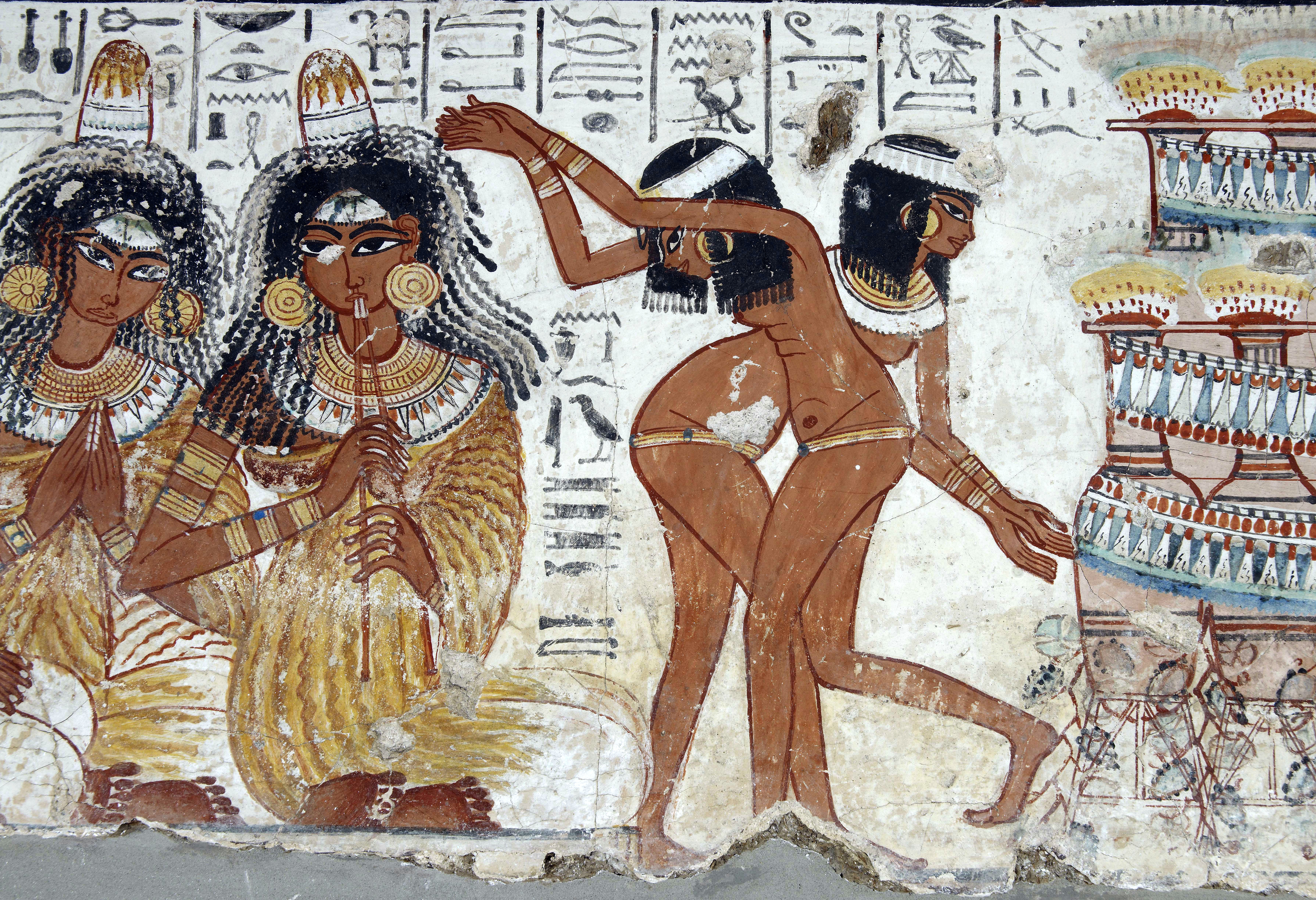
Dancers and Flutists, Thebes (c. 1400 BCE)

=== Ancient Greece ===
Nudity in Greek life was the exception in the ancient world. What had begun as a male initiation rite in the eighth century BCE became a "costume" in the Classical period. Complete nudity separated the civilized Greeks from the "barbarians" including Hebrews, Etruscans, and Gauls.

The earliest Greek sculpture, from the early Bronze Age Cycladic civilization consists mainly of stylized male figures who are presumably nude. This is certainly the case for the kouros, a large standing figure of a male nude that was the mainstay of Archaic Greek sculpture. These first realistic sculptures of nude males depict nude youths who stand rigidly posed with one foot forward. By the 5th century BCE, Greek sculptors' mastery of anatomy resulted in greater naturalness and more varied poses. An important innovation was contrapposto—the asymmetrical posture of a figure standing with one leg bearing the body's weight and the other relaxed. An early example of this is Polykleitos' sculpture Doryphoros (c. 440 BCE).

The Greek goddesses were initially sculpted with drapery rather than nude. The first free-standing, life-sized sculpture of an entirely nude woman was the Aphrodite of Cnidus created c. 360–340 BCE by Praxiteles. The female nude became much more common in the later Hellenistic period. In the convention of heroic nudity, gods and heroes were shown nude, while ordinary mortals were less likely to be so, though athletes and warriors in combat were often depicted nude. The nudes of Greco-Roman art are conceptually perfected ideal persons, each one a vision of health, youth, geometric clarity, and organic equilibrium. Kenneth Clark considered idealization the hallmark of true nudes, as opposed to more descriptive and less artful figures that he considered merely naked. His emphasis on idealization points up an essential issue: seductive and appealing as nudes in art may be, they are meant to stir the mind as well as the passions.

Ancient Greek sculpture
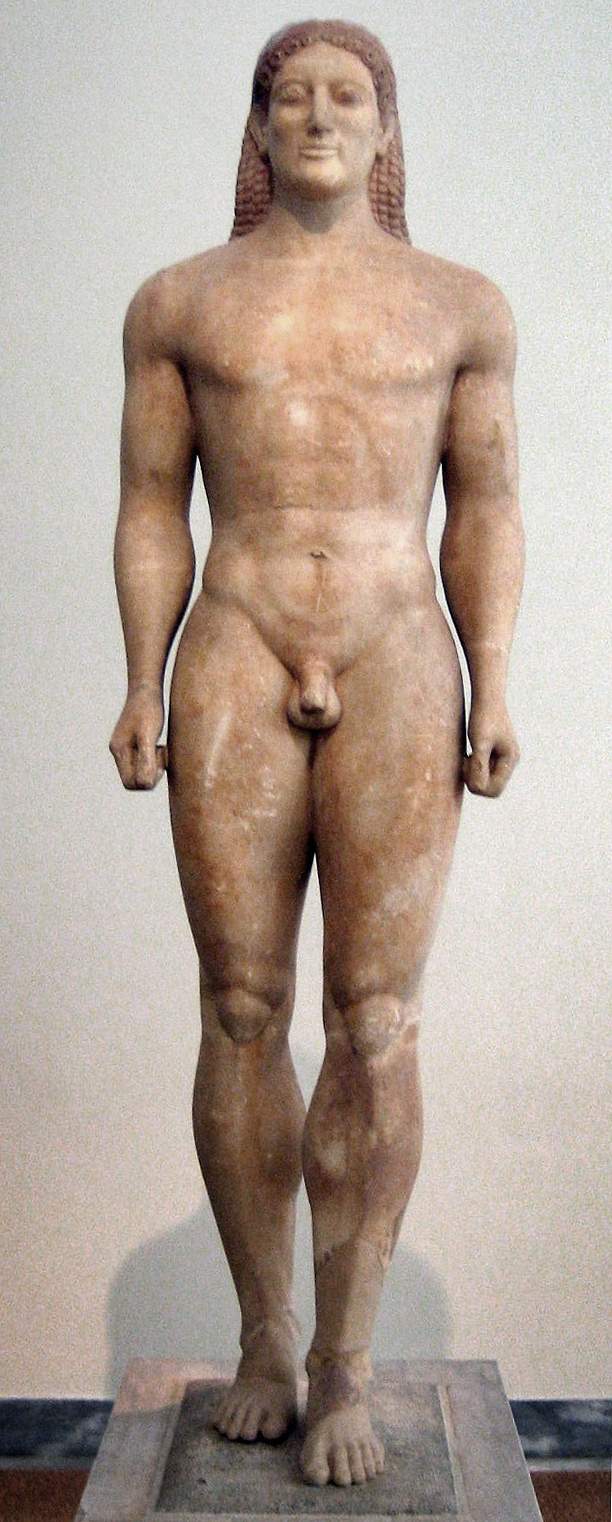
Kroisos Kouros (c. 530 BCE)

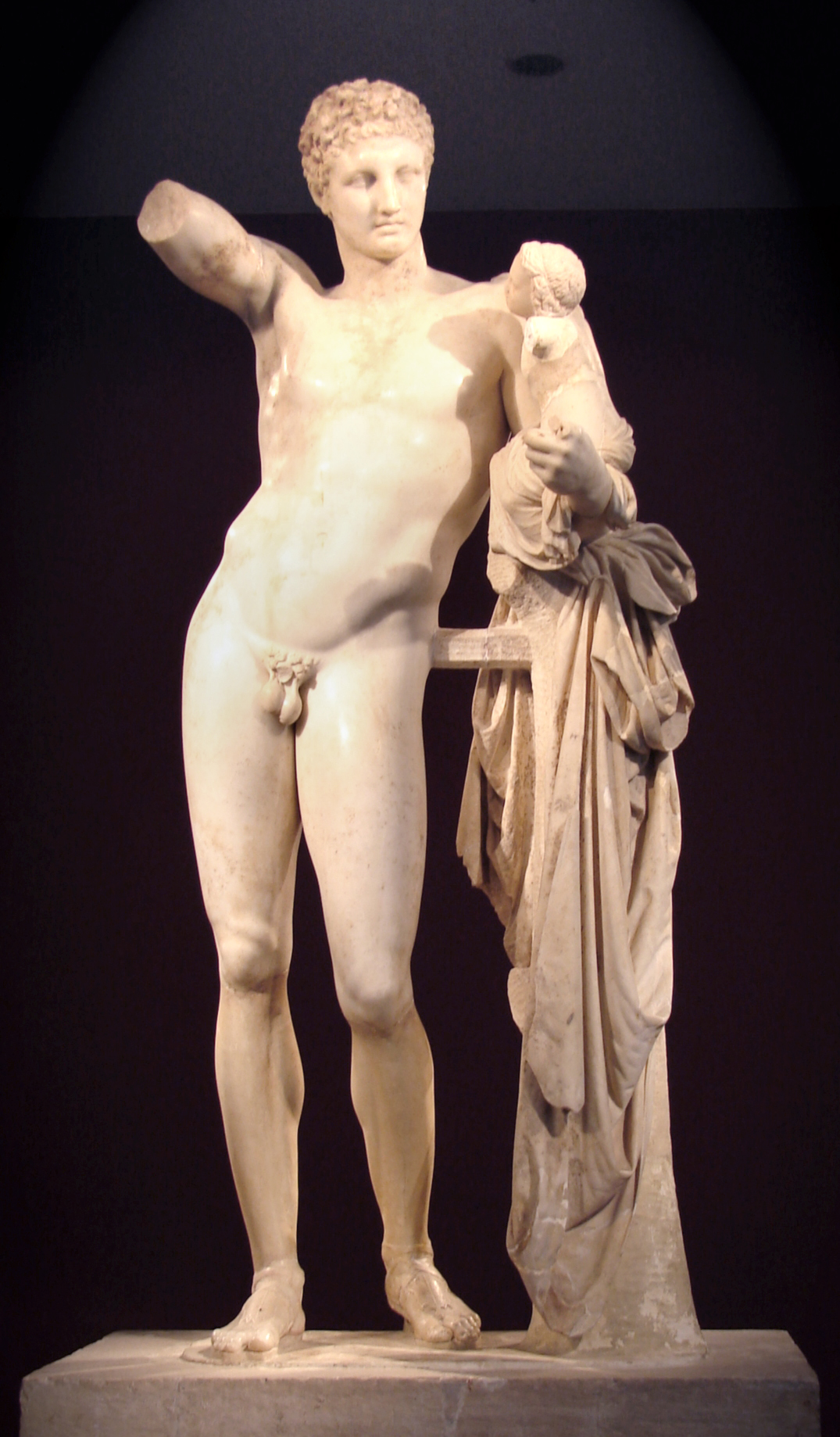
Hermes bearing the infant Dionysus, by Praxiteles

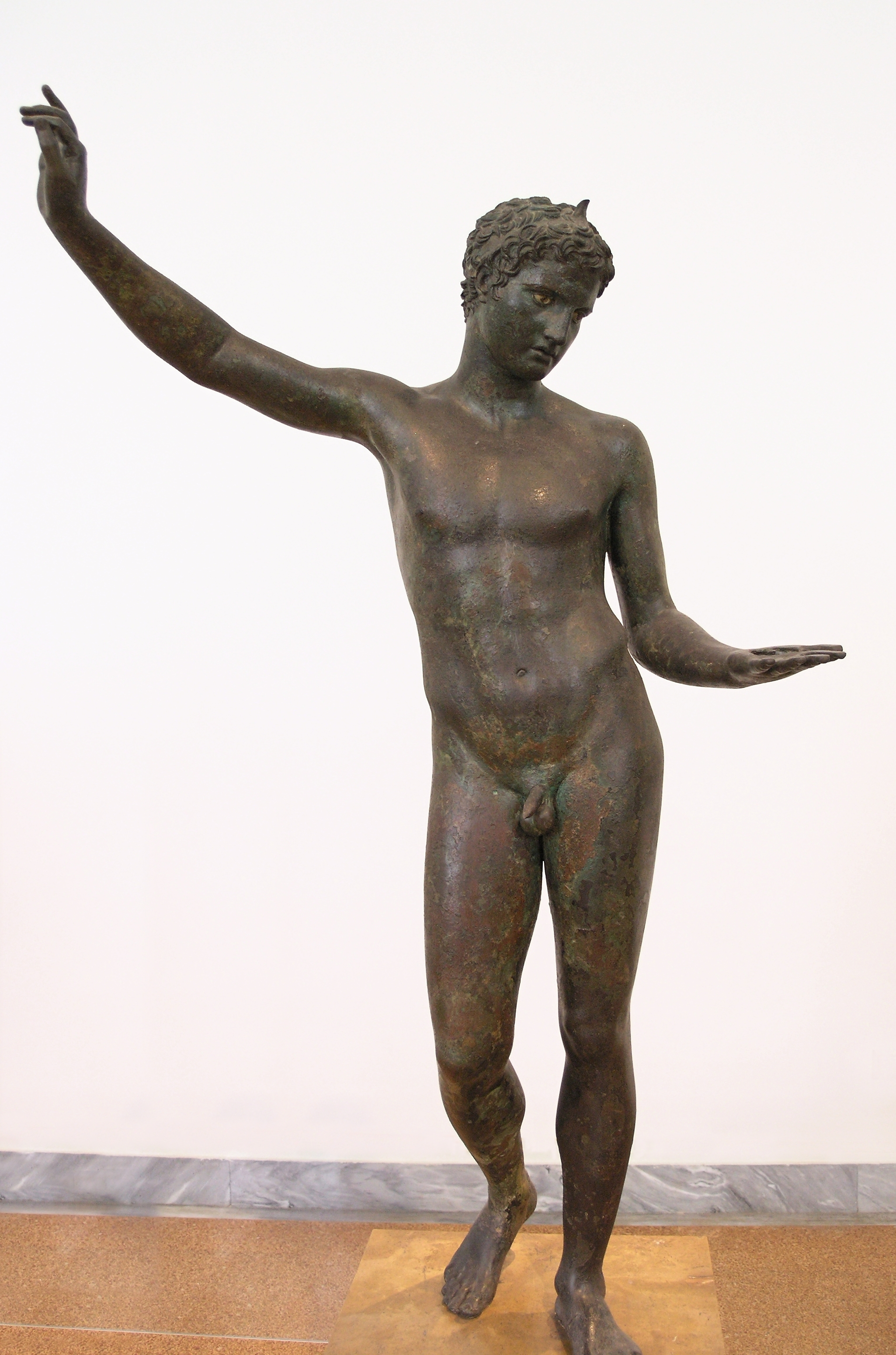
The Marathon Boy (4th century BCE) bronze statue, possibly by Praxiteles

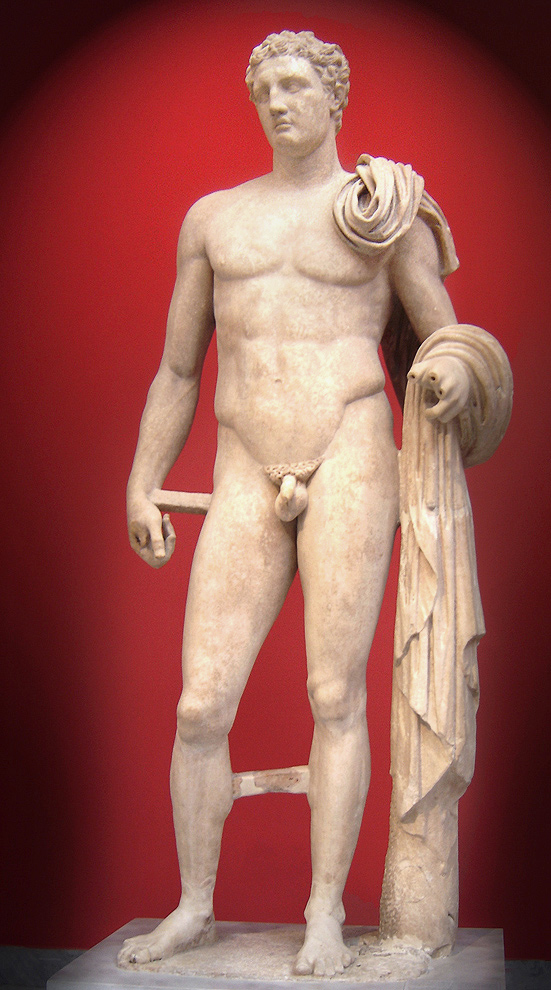
Hermes, possibly by Lysippos

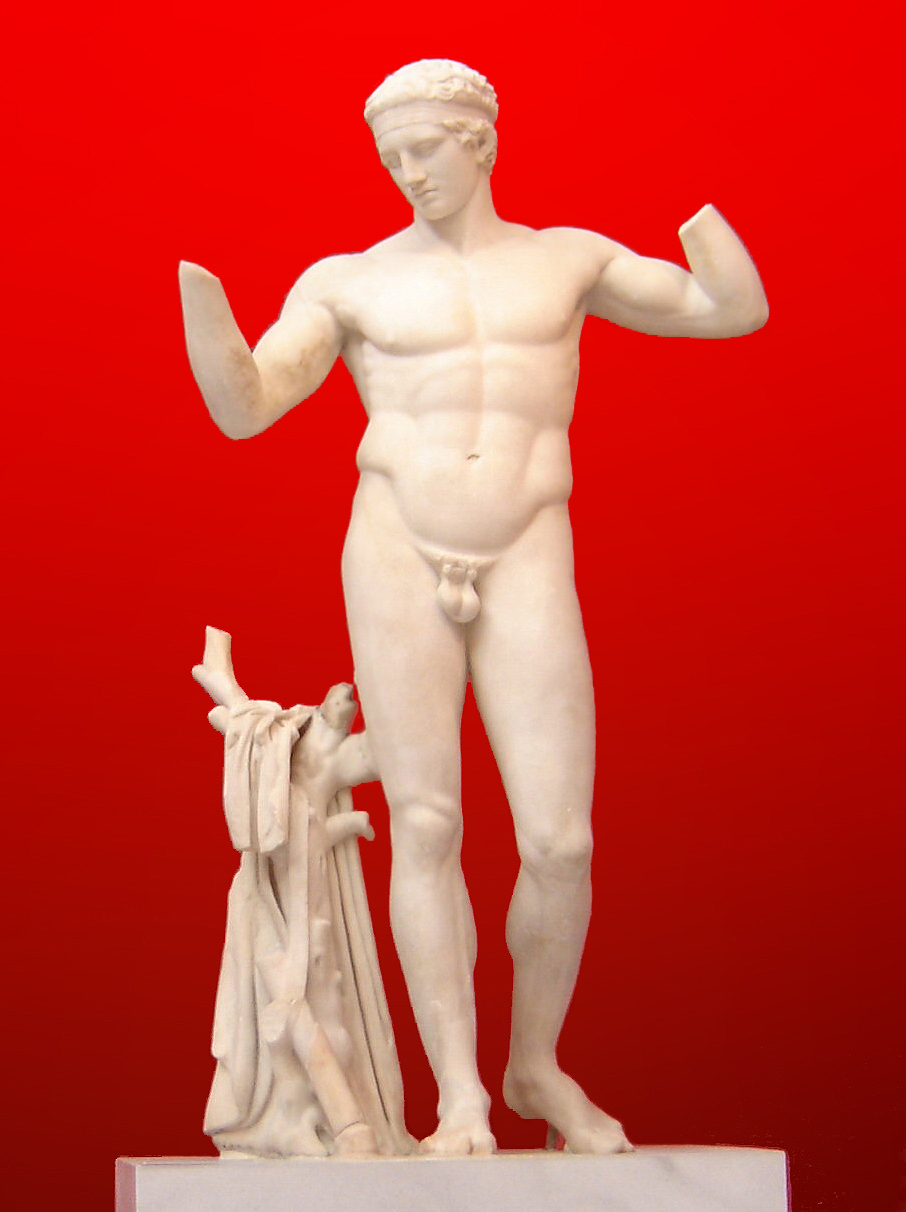
Diadumenos, by Polykleitos

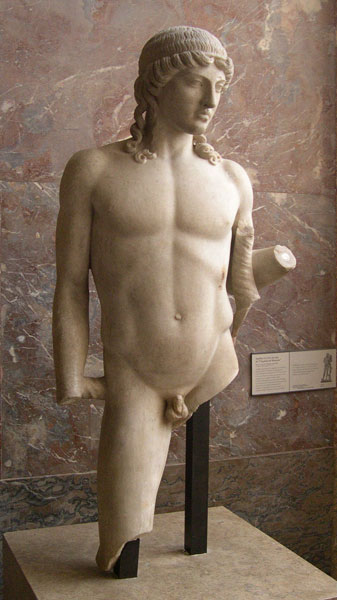
Apollo, by Polykleitos

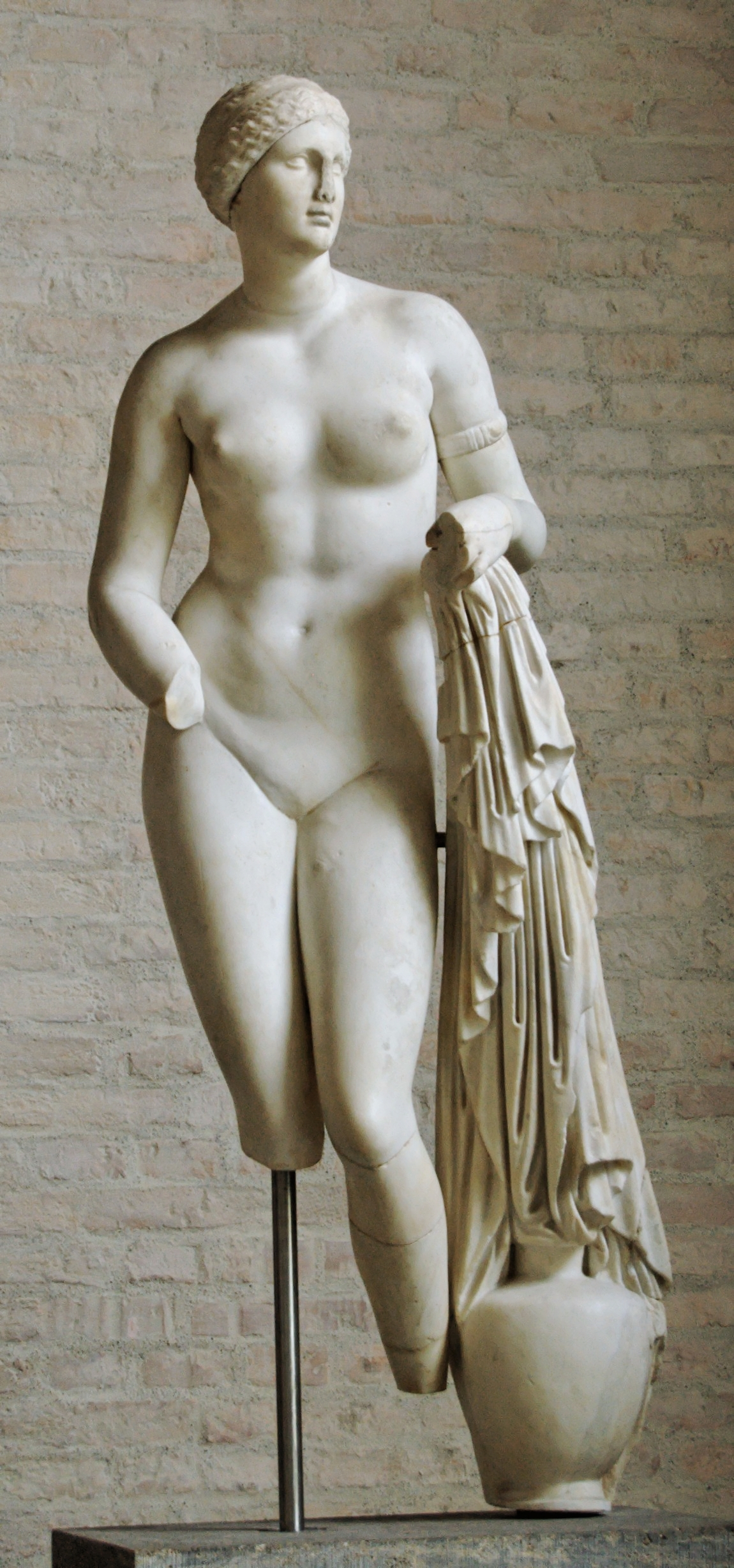
So-called Venus Braschi by Praxiteles, type of the Knidian Aphrodite

=== Asian art ===
Non-Western traditions of depicting nudes come from India and Japan, but the nude does not form an important aspect of Chinese art. Temple sculptures and cave paintings, some very explicit, are part of the Hindu tradition of the value of sexuality, and as in many warm climates partial or complete nudity was common in everyday life, or at least court life, in ancient India. Many deities and sacred figures are shown partially or entirely nude. Many images also show figures in very thin clinging fabrics, that are effectively nudes; paint may have originally made the difference between clothed and unclothed areas more clear. Nude sculptures are found at Buddhist sites such as Bharhut, Sanchi and Hindu ones such as Khajuraho, Konark, etc. The Muslim invasions of India greatly reduced the amount of the body displayed in both real life and art.

Japan had a tradition of mixed communal bathing that existed until very recently, and was often portrayed in manuscript illustrations, and later ukiyo-e woodblock prints and paintings.

In the early twentieth century, artists in the Arab world used nudity in works that have been claimed to address their emergence from colonialism into a modern world.

The nude in Asian art
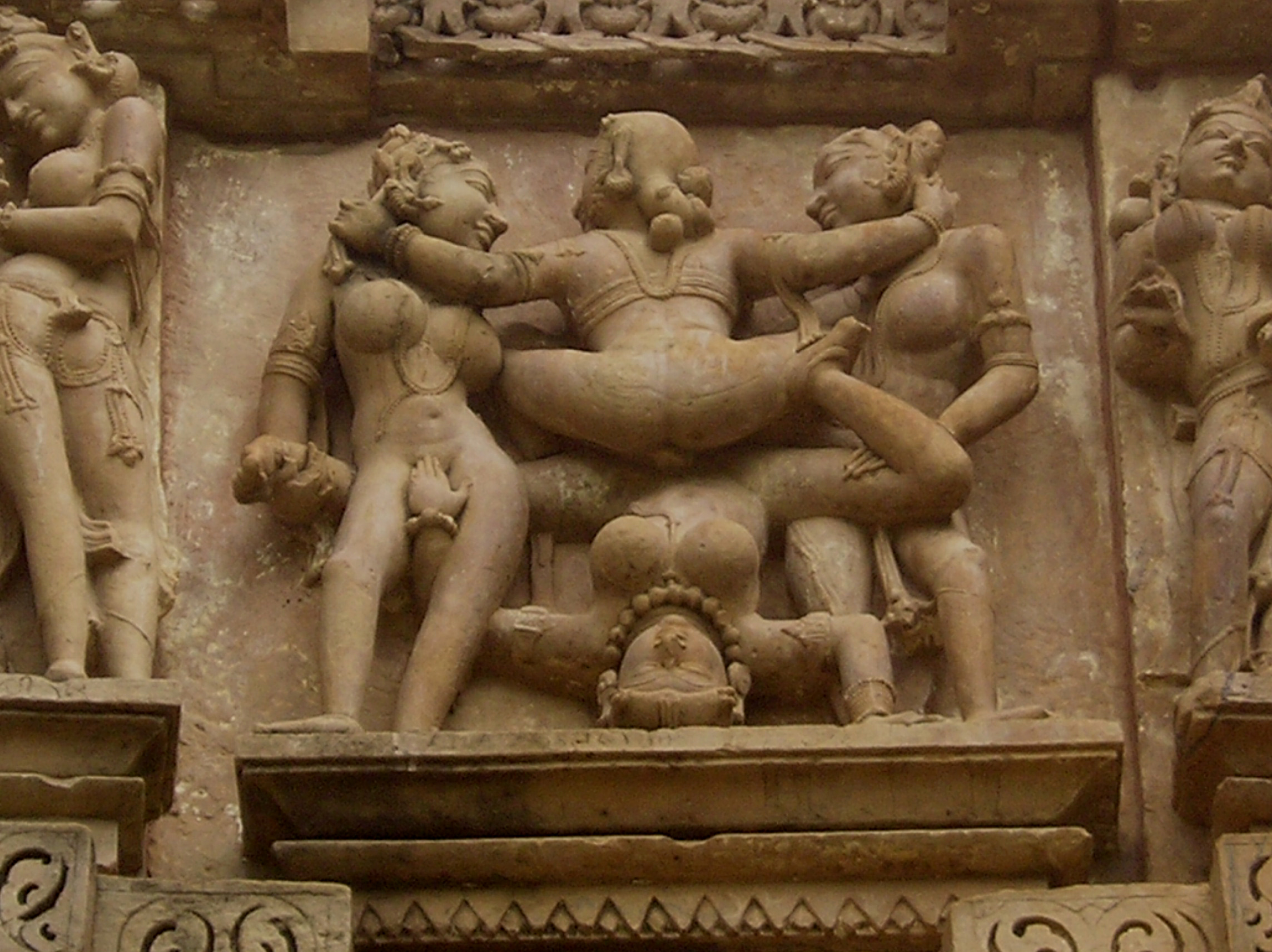
Kandariya Mahadev Temple in Khajuraho, India (1050)

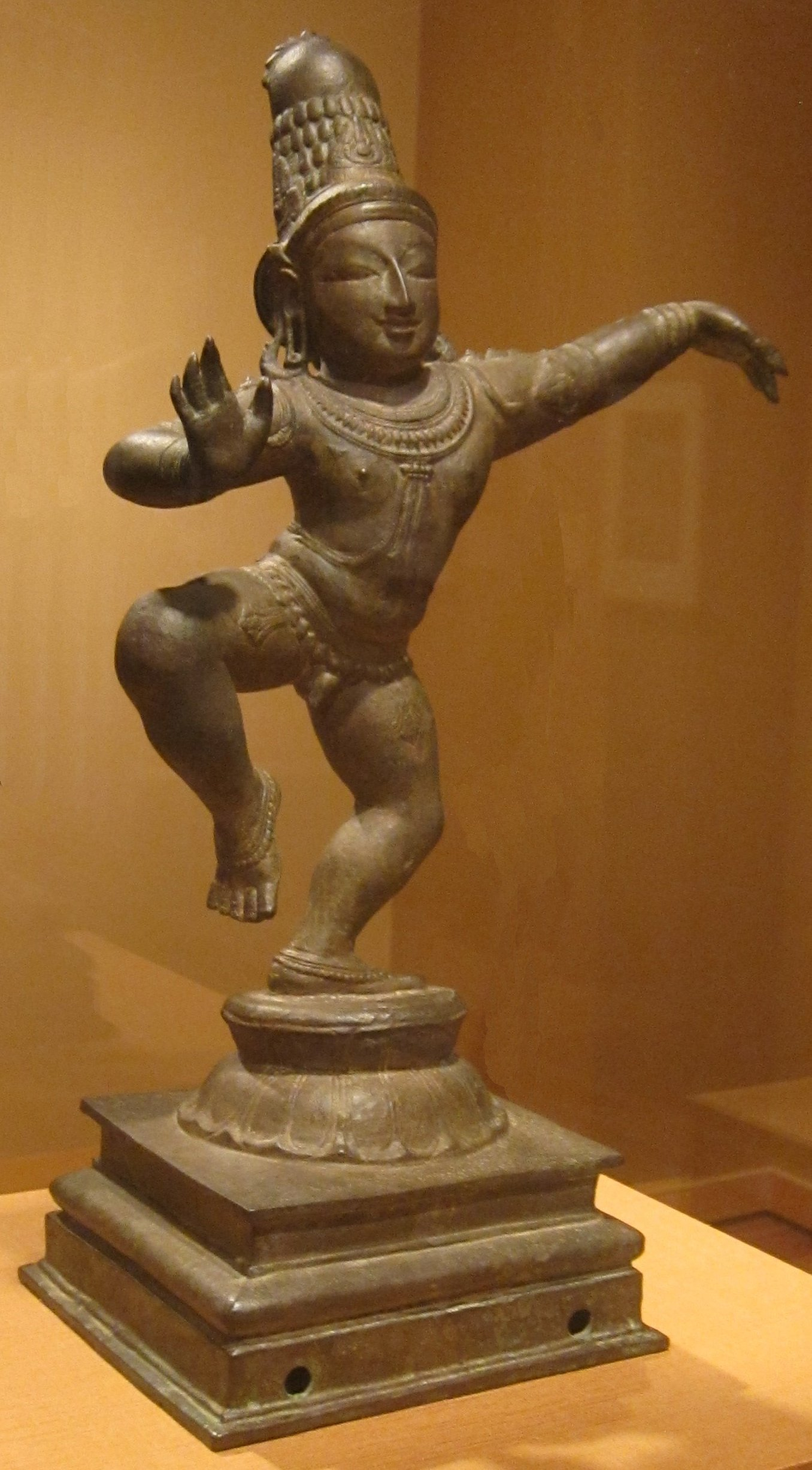
Bala Krishna dancing (14th century)

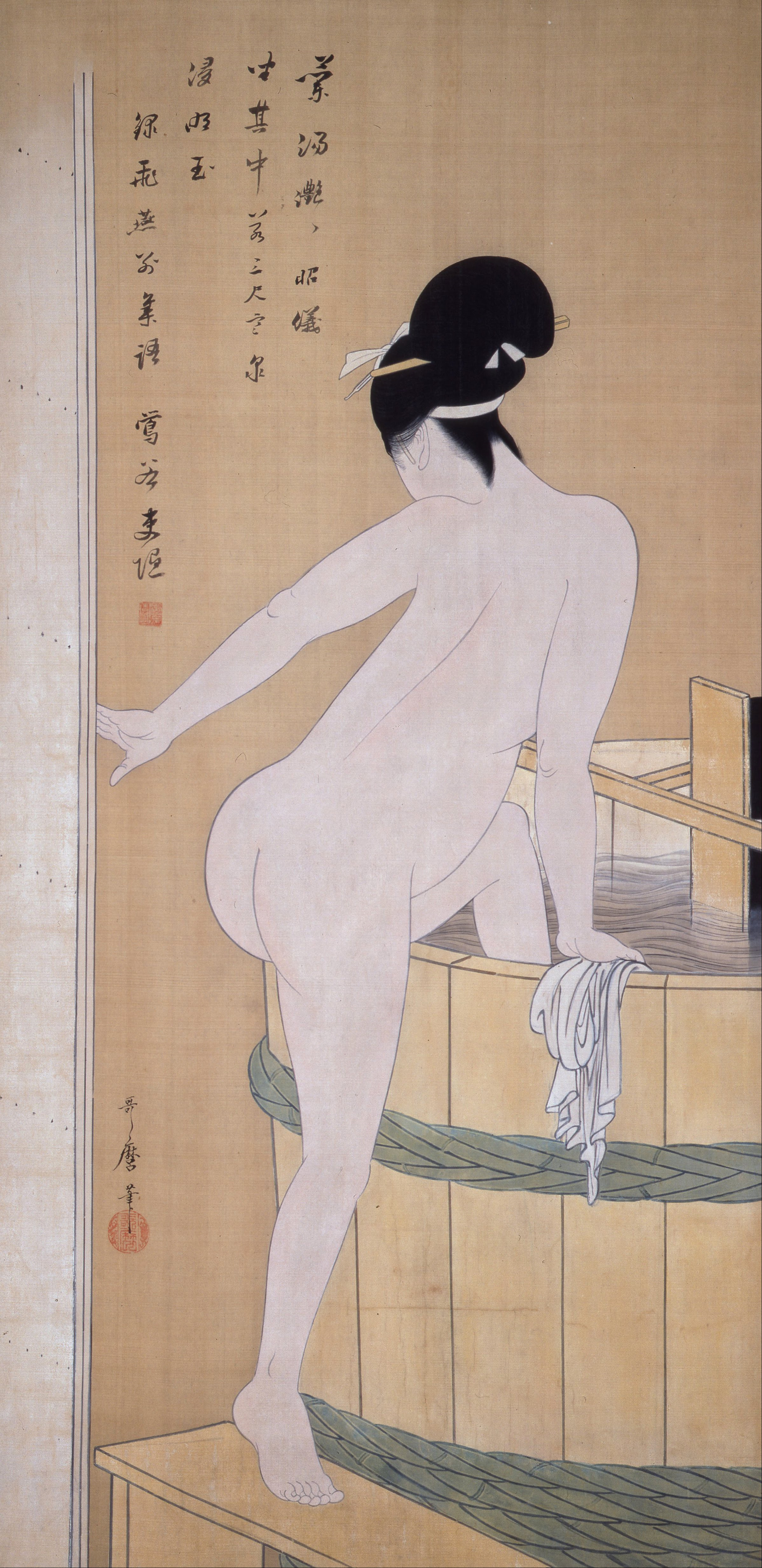
Bathing woman (c. 1753), Kitagawa Utamaro

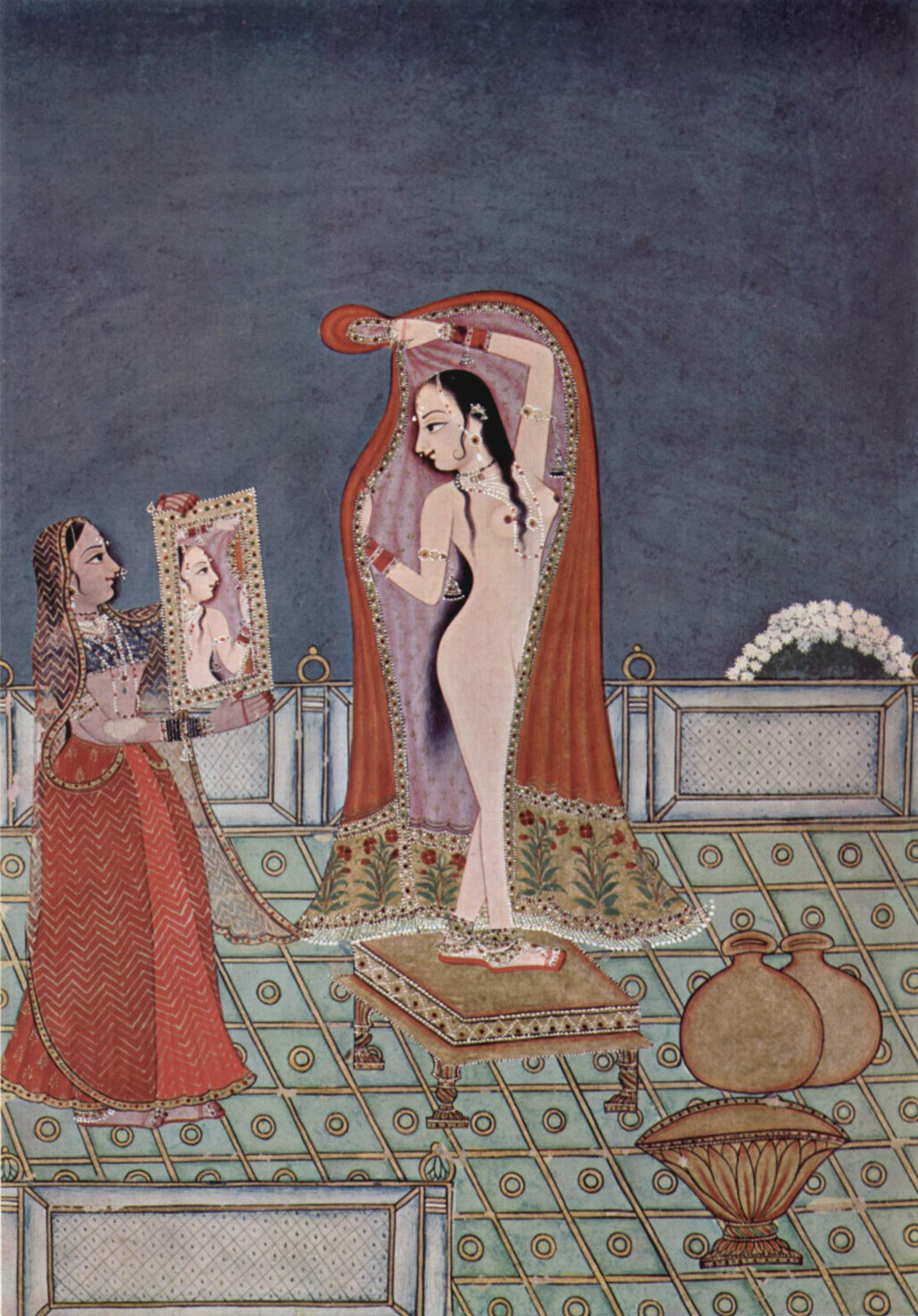
Woman putting on her clothes (1775), unknown Indian artist

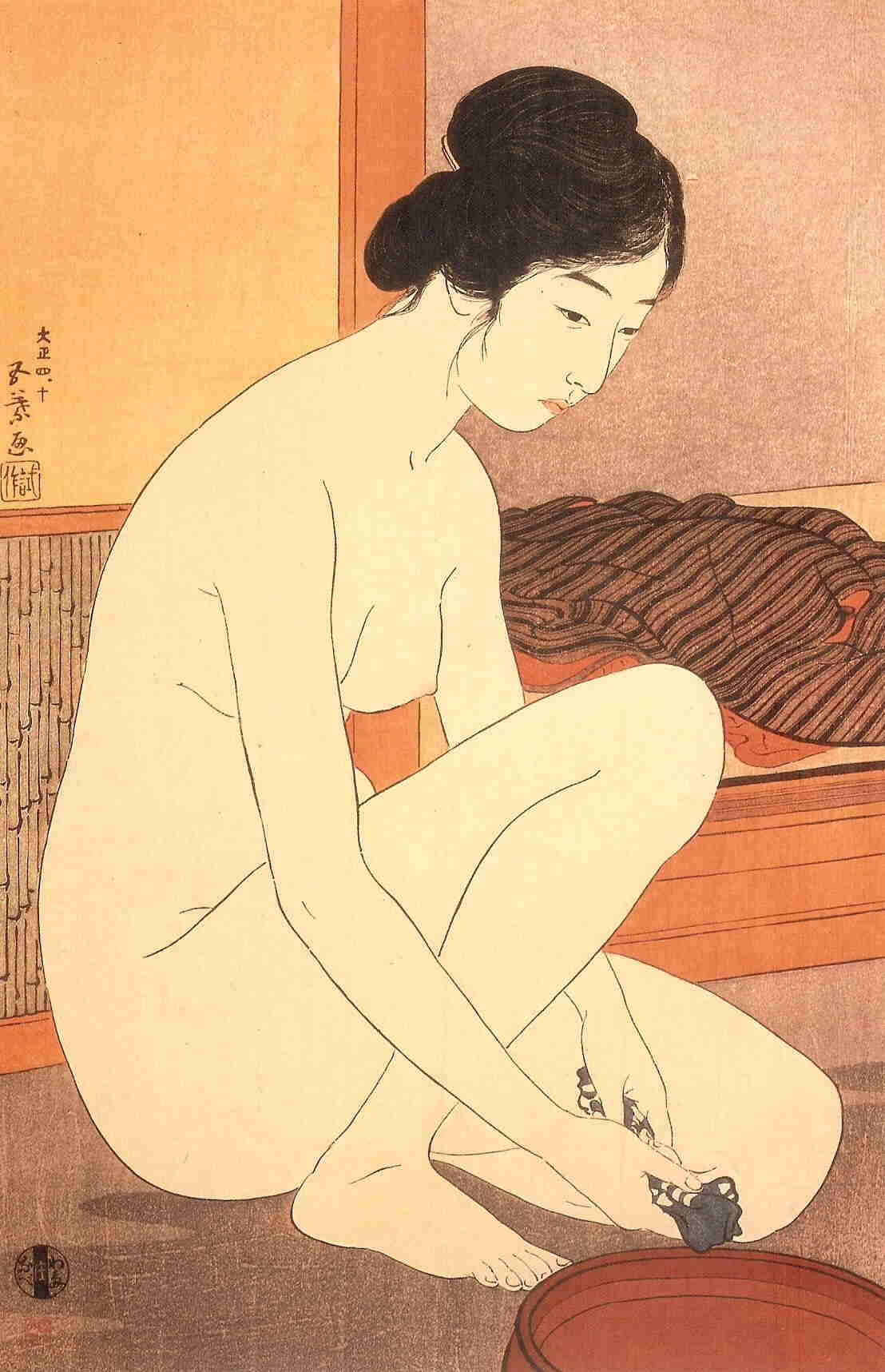
Yuami (1915), Hashiguchi Goyô

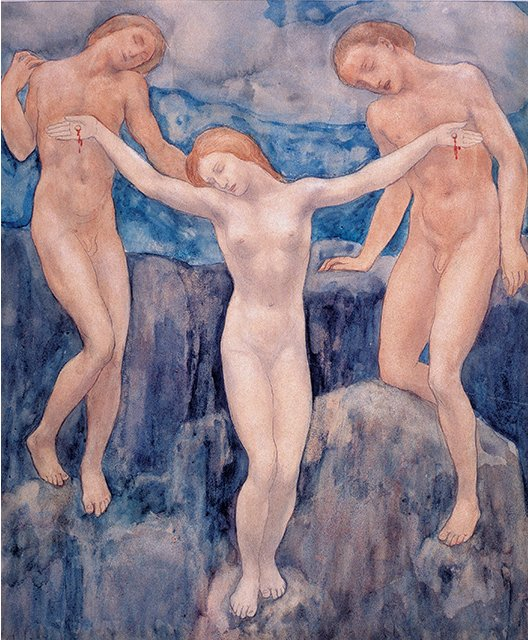
Pain, illustration for The Prophet by Kahlil Gibran (1923)

Wisdom, Impression, Sentiment by Kuroda Seiki (c. 1899)

=== Middle Ages ===
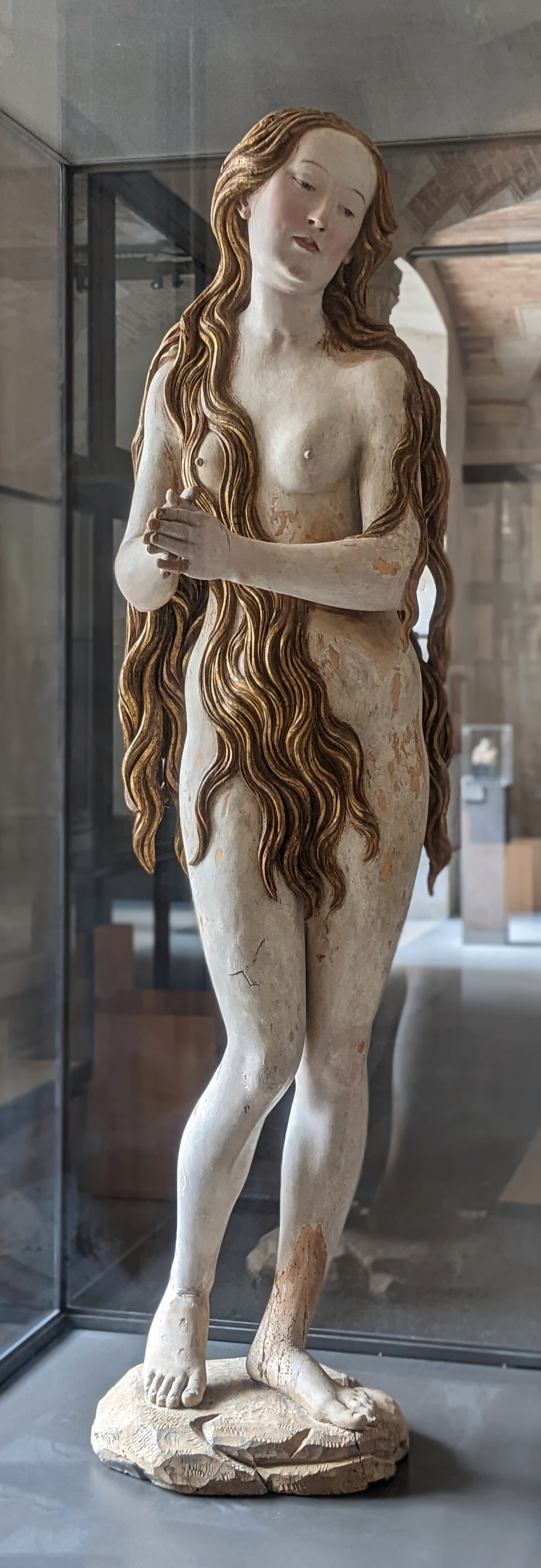
Saint Mary Magdalene by Gregor Erhart.

==== Early Middle Ages ====
Christian attitudes cast doubt on the value of the human body, and the Christian emphasis on chastity and celibacy further discouraged depictions of nakedness, even in the few surviving Early Medieval survivals of secular art. Completely unclothed figures are rare in medieval art, the notable exceptions being Adam and Eve as recorded in the Book of Genesis and the damned in Last Judgement scenes anticipating the Sistine Chapel renderings. With these exceptions, the ideal forms of Greco-Roman nudes became largely lost, transformed into symbols of shame and sin, weakness and defenselessness. This was true not only in Western Europe, but also in Byzantine art. Increasingly, Christ was shown largely naked in scenes of his Passion, especially the Crucifixion, and even when glorified in heaven, to allow him to display the wounds his sufferings had involved. The Nursing Madonna and naked "Penitent Mary Magdalene", as well as the infant Jesus, whose penis was sometimes emphasized for theological reasons, are other exceptions with elements of nudity in medieval religious art.

==== Late Middle Ages ====
By the late medieval period female nudes intended to be attractive edged back into art, especially in the relatively private medium of the illuminated manuscript, and in classical contexts such as the Signs of the Zodiac and illustrations to Ovid. The shape of the female "Gothic nude" was very different from the classical ideal, with a long body shaped by gentle curves, a narrow chest and high waist, small round breasts, and a prominent bulge at the stomach. Male nudes tended to be slim and slight in figure, probably drawing on apprentices used as models, but were increasingly accurately observed.

=== Renaissance ===
The Birth of Venus by Sandro Botticelli, c. 1484–1486

During the Renaissance, interest in the nude body in art was being rekindled after a thousand years. Toward the end of Greco-Roman antiquity, Christian doctrines of celibacy, chastity, and the devaluation of the flesh led to the declining interest of nudes for patrons, and thus for artists. Since the end of the ancient classical period, the unclothed body was only depicted in rare instances like renderings of Adam and Eve. Now, with the rise of Renaissance humanism, Renaissance artists were relishing opportunities to depict the unclothed body.

The reinvigoration of classical culture in the Renaissance restored the nude to art. Donatello made two statues of the Biblical hero David, a symbol for the Republic of Florence: his first (in marble, 1408–1409) shows a clothed figure, but his second, probably of the 1440s, is the first freestanding statue of a nude since antiquity, several decades before Michelangelo's massive David (1501–1504). Nudes in Michelangelo's Sistine Chapel ceiling reestablished a tradition of male nudes in depictions of Biblical stories; the subject of the martyrdom of the near-naked Saint Sebastian had already become highly popular. The monumental female nude returned to Western art in 1486 with The Birth of Venus by Sandro Botticelli for the Medici family, who also owned the classical Venus de' Medici, whose pose Botticelli adapted.

Andrea Mantegna (1431–1506) is considered by art historians to have been a pivotal figure in the resurgence of nudes in art because of his love of the ancient classical world and how he incorporated classical principles of form into his creations. He is not the first to use classical influences in his work. However, few painters before him did this to the conspicuous degree and quality to which he did. He is known as a master of form, and his nudes are noteworthy because his style is influenced by his study of ancient classical sculpture and his knowledge of ancient classical Greek and Roman culture. The drawing of St. James Led to His Execution demonstrates that, early on, Mantegna did anatomical nude sketches in preparation for the Ovetari Chapel frescoes. This is the earliest known drawing by the artist.

The Dresden Venus of Giorgione (c. 1510), also drawing on classical models, showed a reclining female nude in a landscape, beginning a long line of famous paintings including the Venus of Urbino (Titian, 1538), and the Rokeby Venus (Diego Velázquez, c. 1650). Although they reflect the proportions of ancient statuary, such figures as Titian's Venus and the Lute Player and Venus of Urbino highlight the sexuality of the female body rather than its ideal geometry. These works inspired countless reclining female nudes for centuries afterwards. In addition to adult male and female figures, the classical depiction of Eros became the model for the naked Christ child.

Raphael in his later years is usually credited as the first artist to consistently use female models for the drawings of female figures, rather than studio apprentices or other boys with breasts added, who were previously used. Michelangelo's suspiciously boyish Study of a Kneeling Nude Girl for The Entombment (Louvre, c. 1500), which is usually said to be the first nude female figure study, predates this and is an example of how even figures who would be shown clothed in the final work were often worked out in nude studies, so that the form under the clothing was understood. The nude figure drawing or figure study of a live model rapidly became an important part of artistic practice and training, and remained so until the 20th century.

16th century
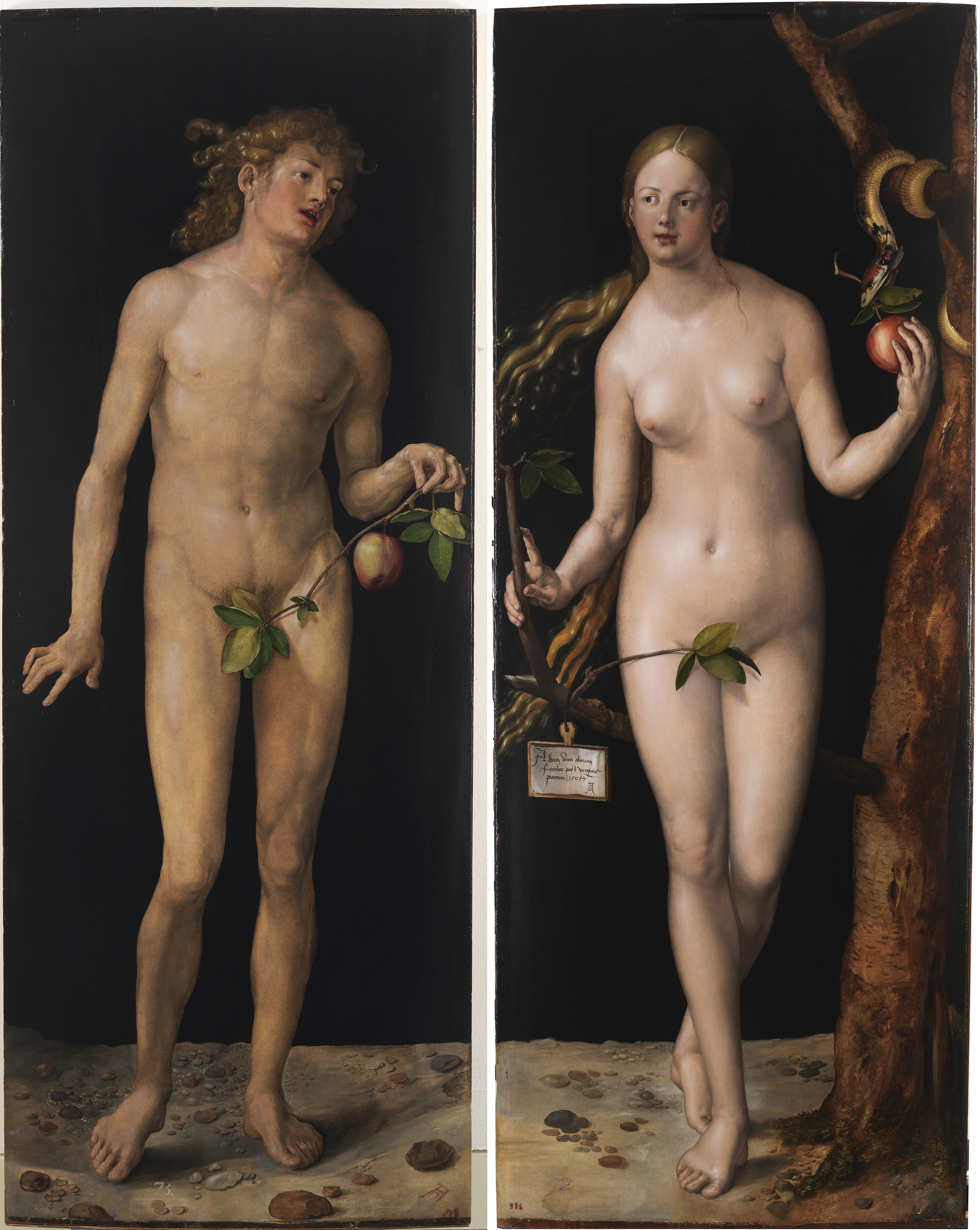
Adam and Eve (1507) by Albrecht Dürer

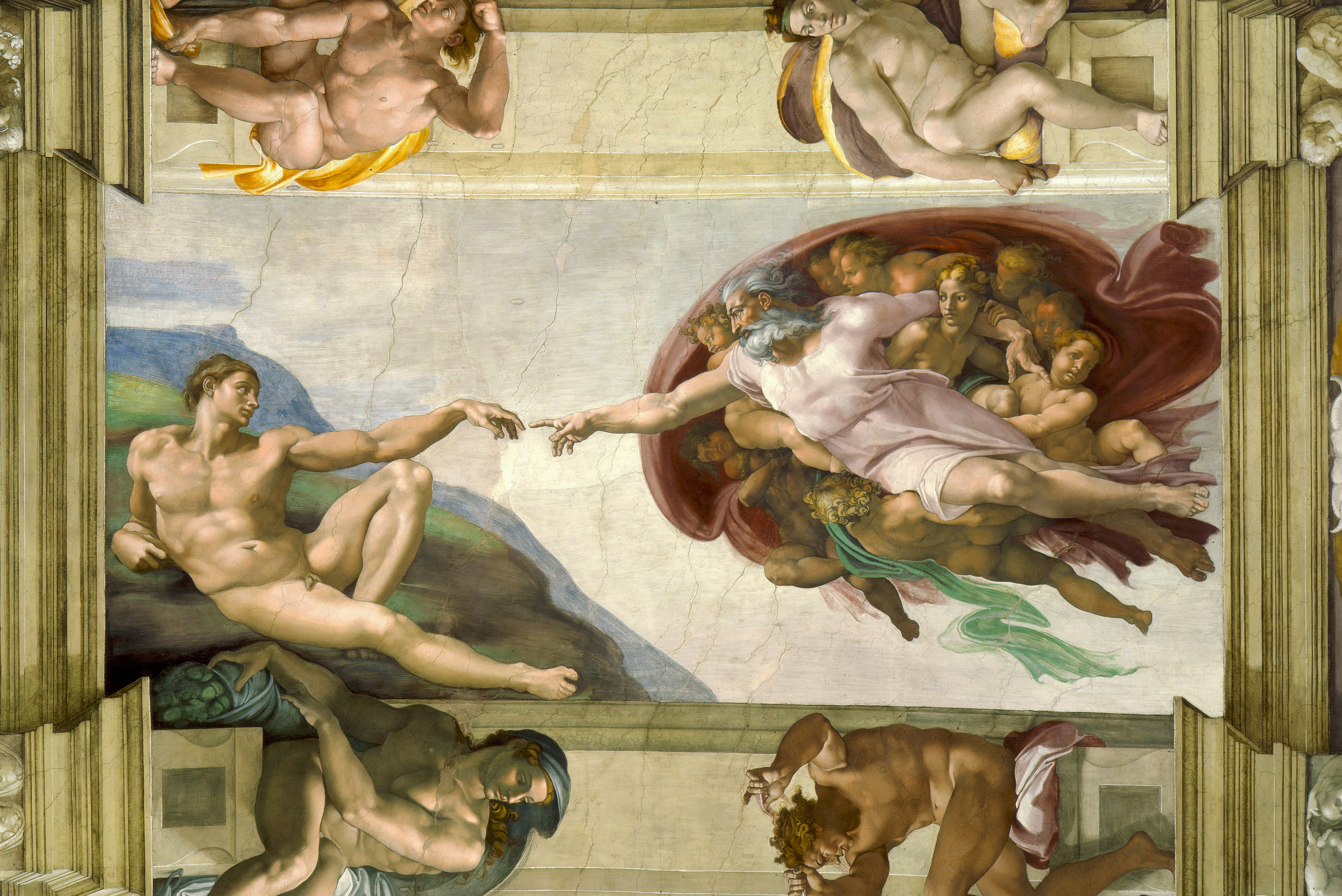
The Creation of Adam (c. 1512) by Michelangelo

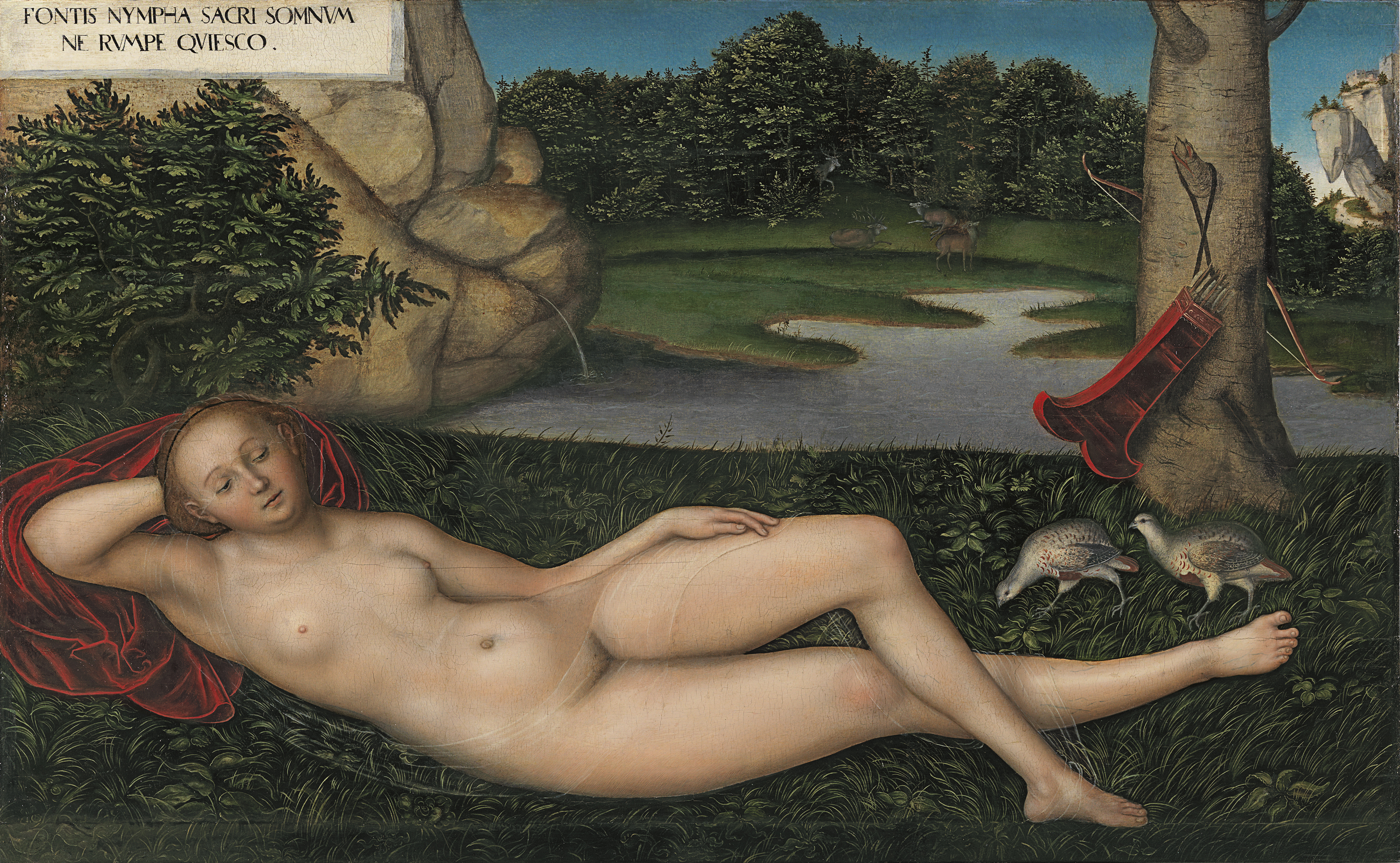
Reclining Nymph (1530–34) by Lucas Cranach the Elder

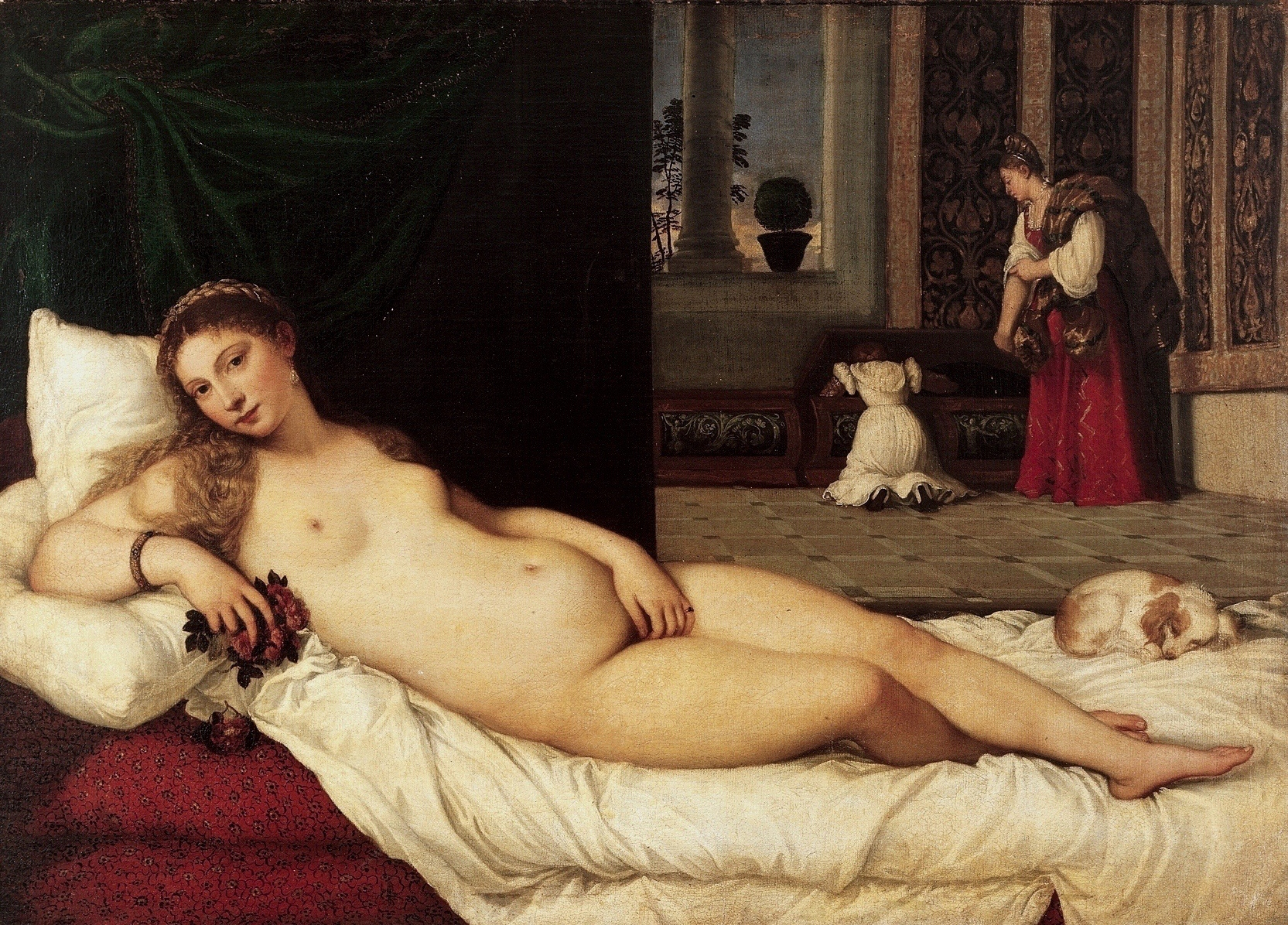
Venus of Urbino (1538) by Titian

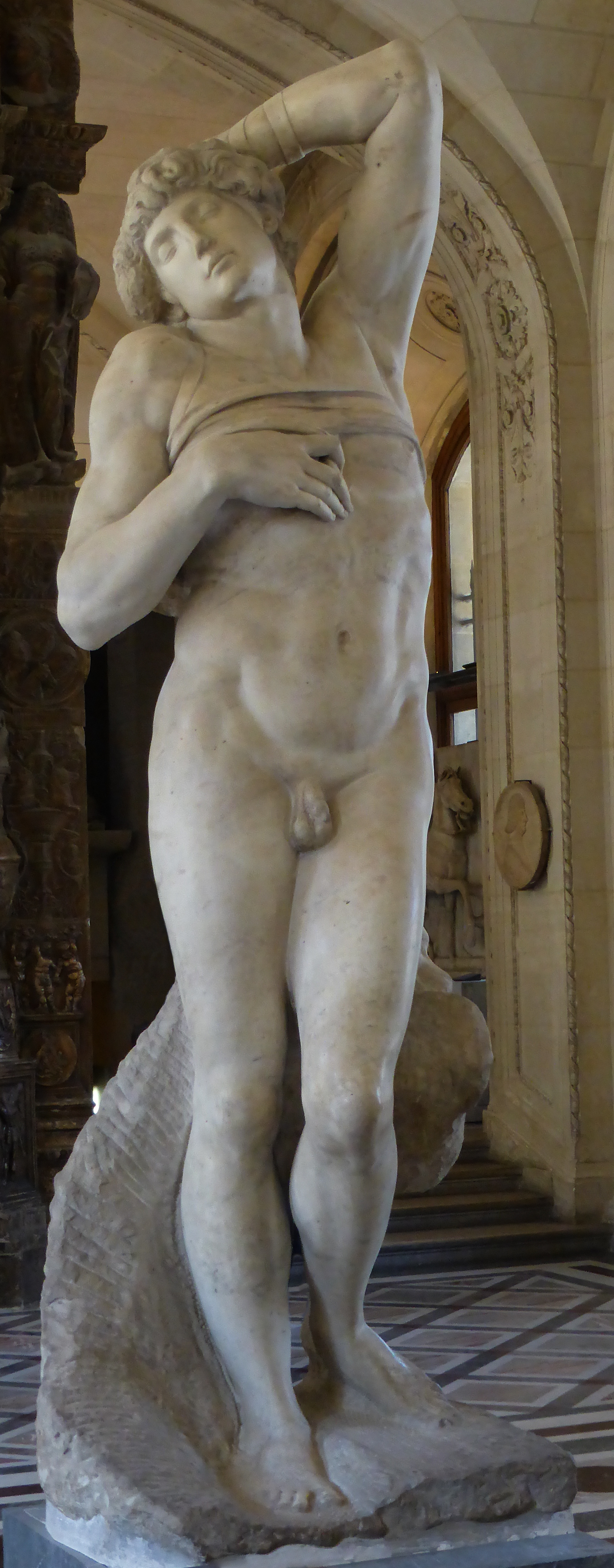
Dying Slave (1513–1516) by Michelangelo

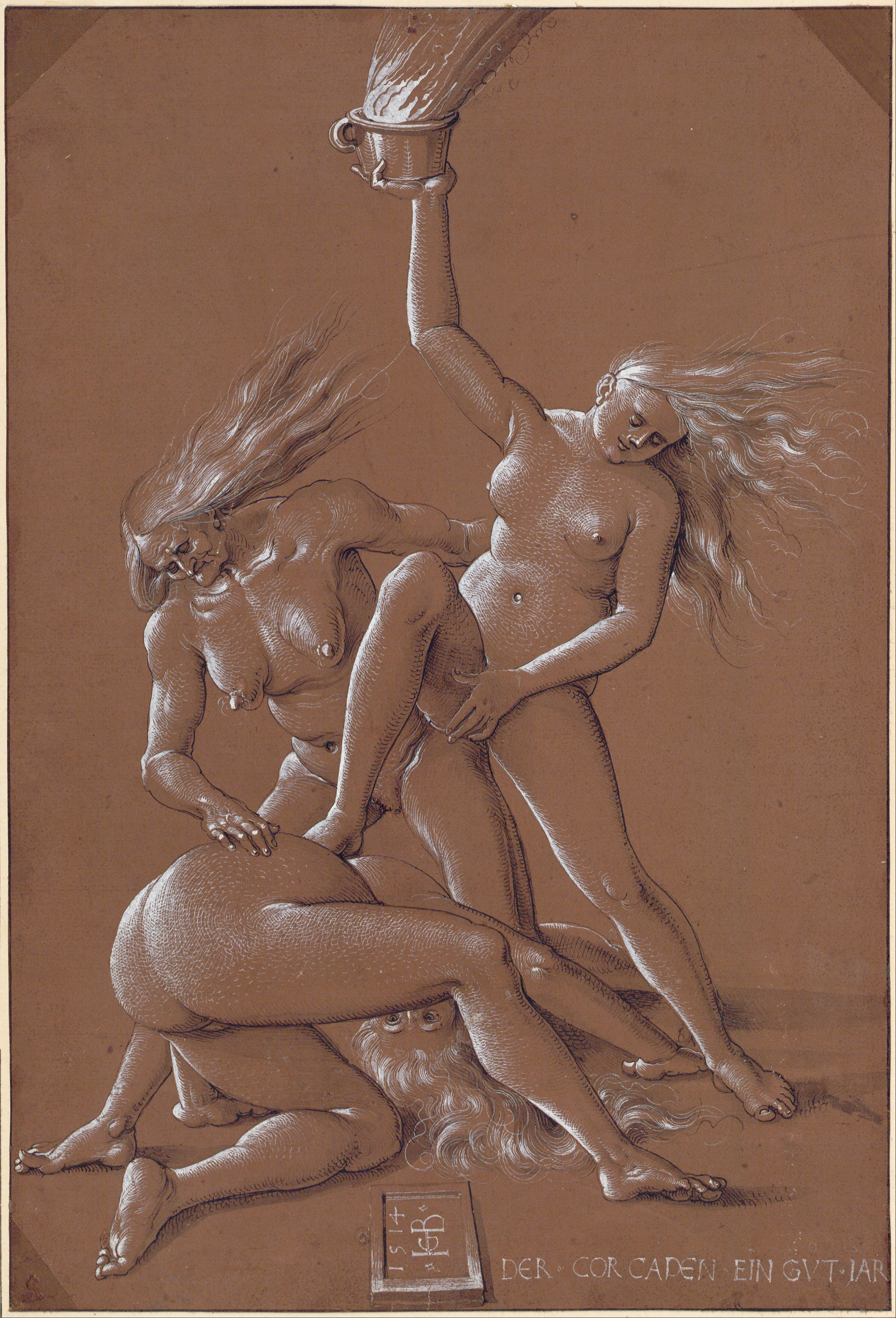
New Year's Greeting with Three Witches (1514) by Hans Baldung

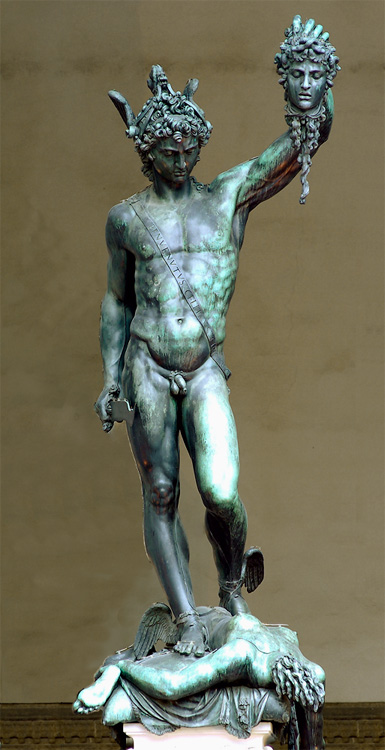
Perseus with the Head of Medusa (1545–1554) by Benvenuto Cellini

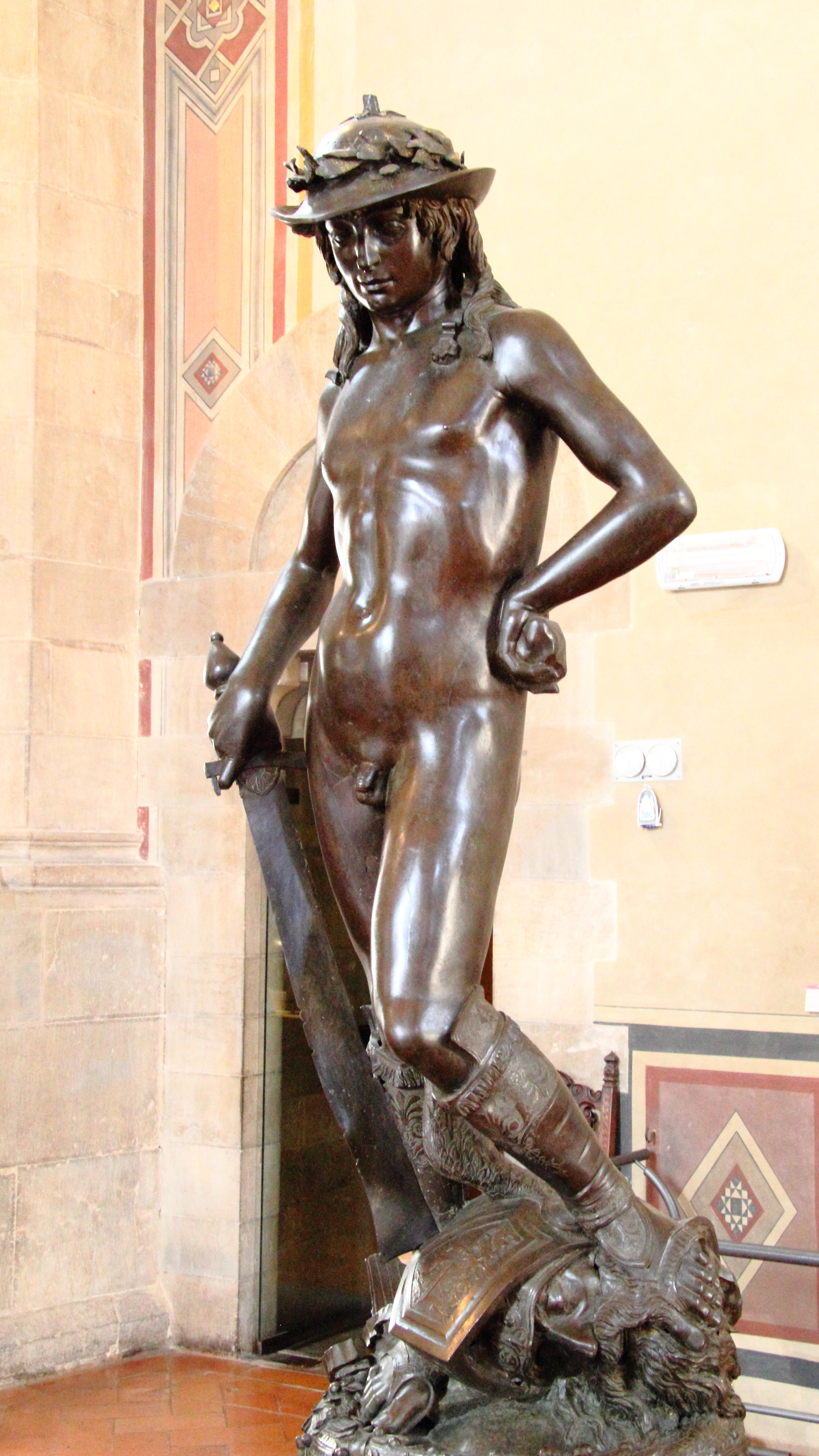
David (1440s) by Donatello

=== 17th and 18th centuries ===
Baroque and Rococo
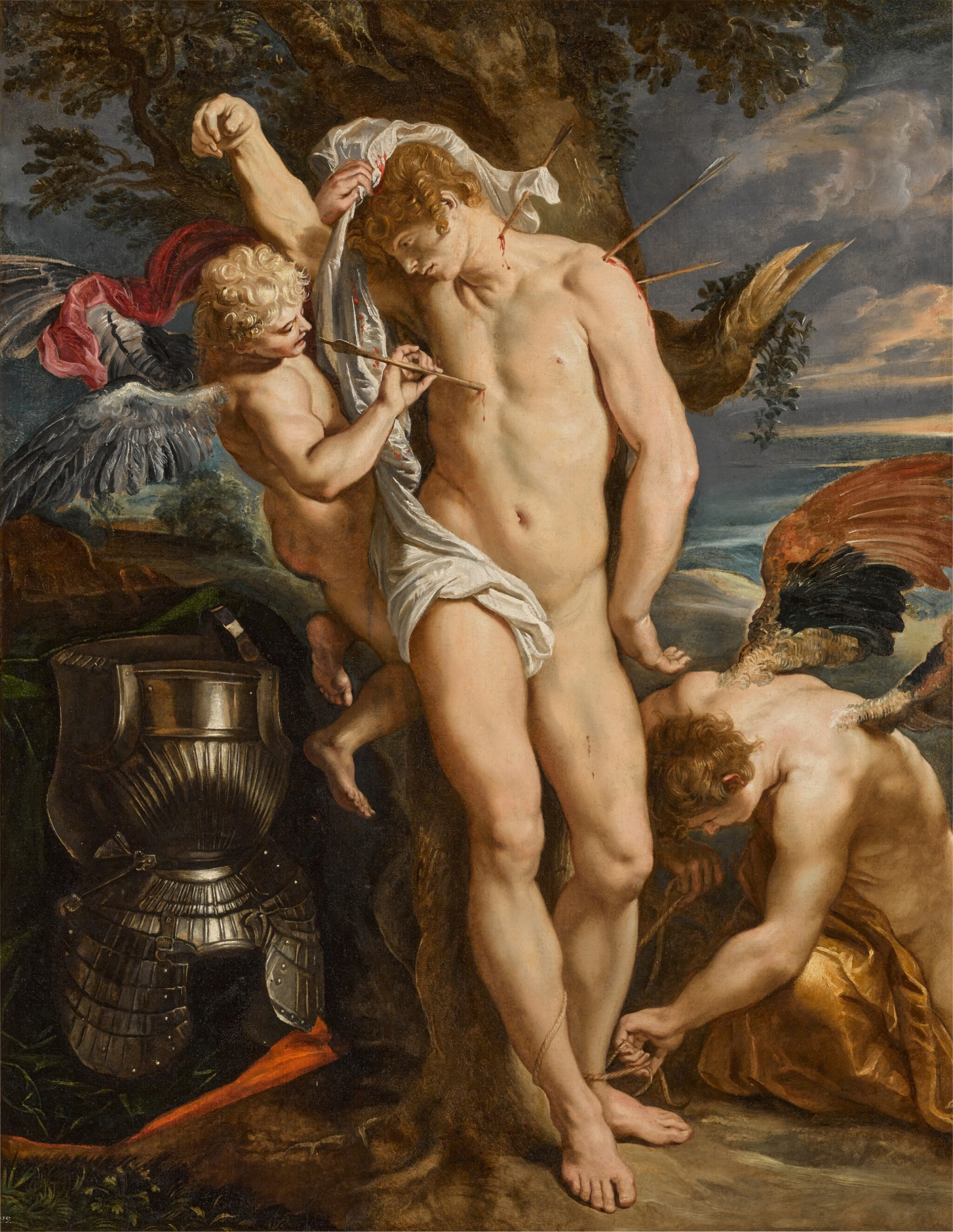
Saint Sebastian (1606-1610) by Peter Paul Rubens

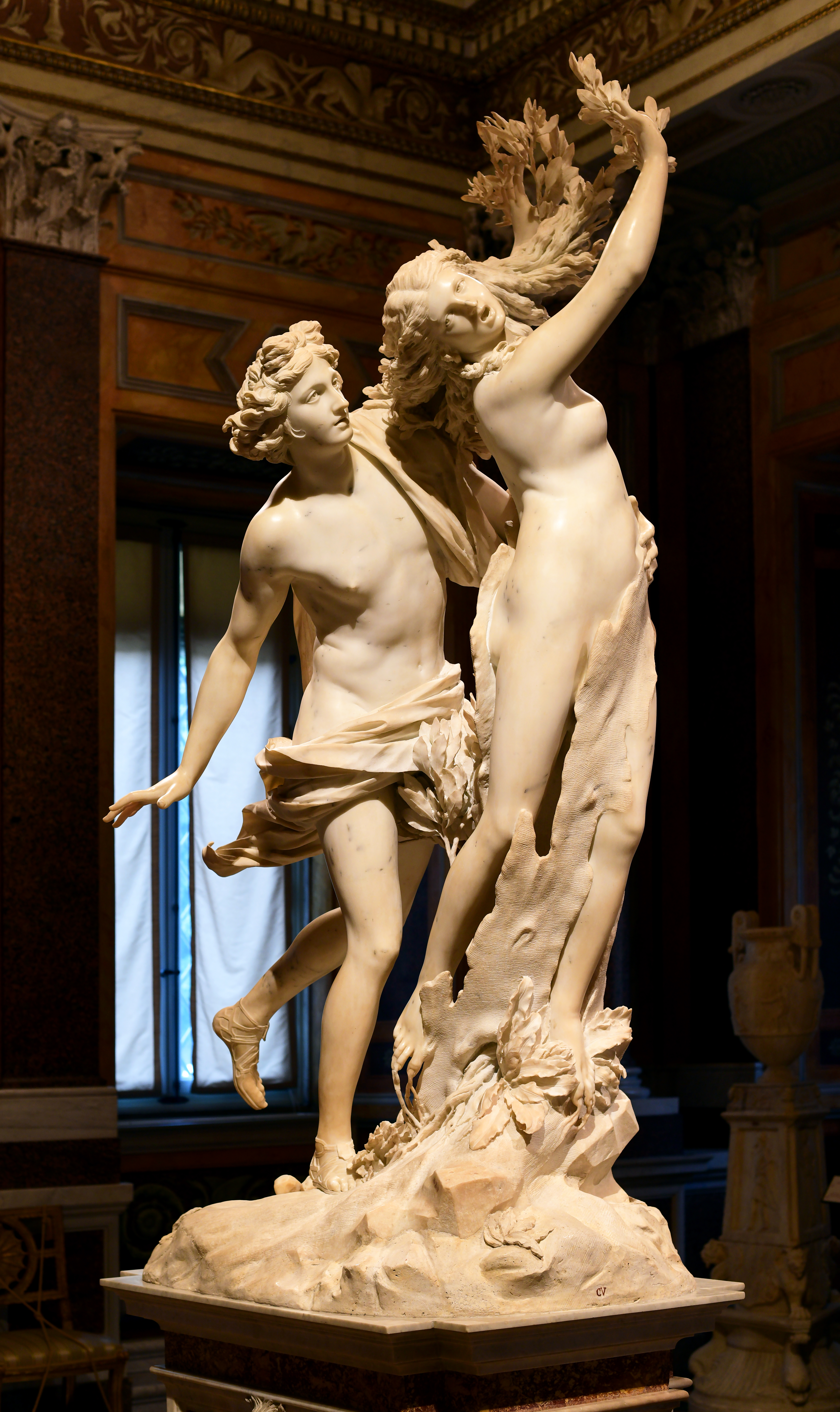
Apollo and Daphne (1622) by Gian Lorenzo Bernini

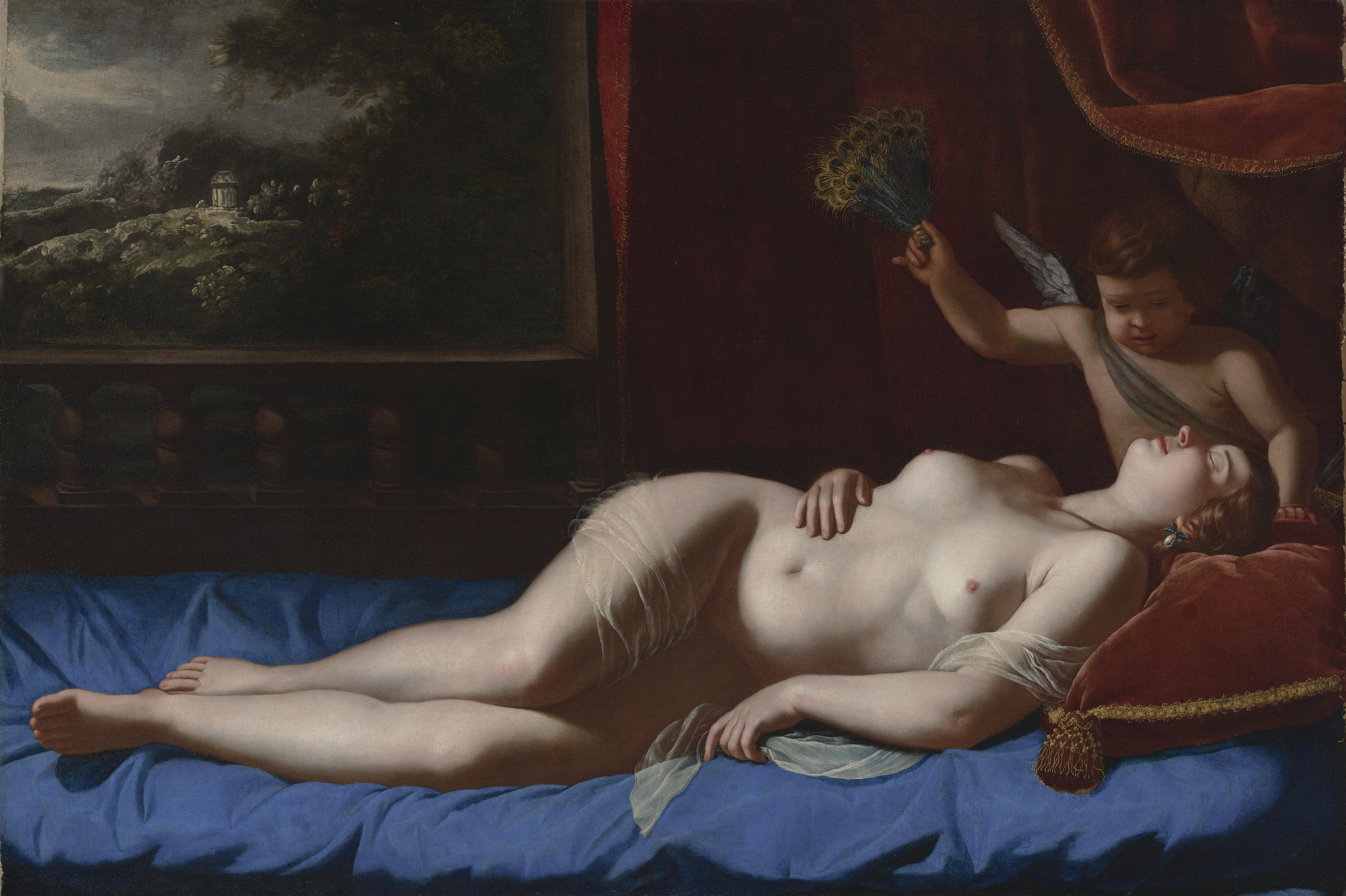
Venus and Cupid (Sleeping Venus) (1625—1630) by Artemisia Gentileschi

The Three Graces (1636–1638) by Peter Paul Rubens

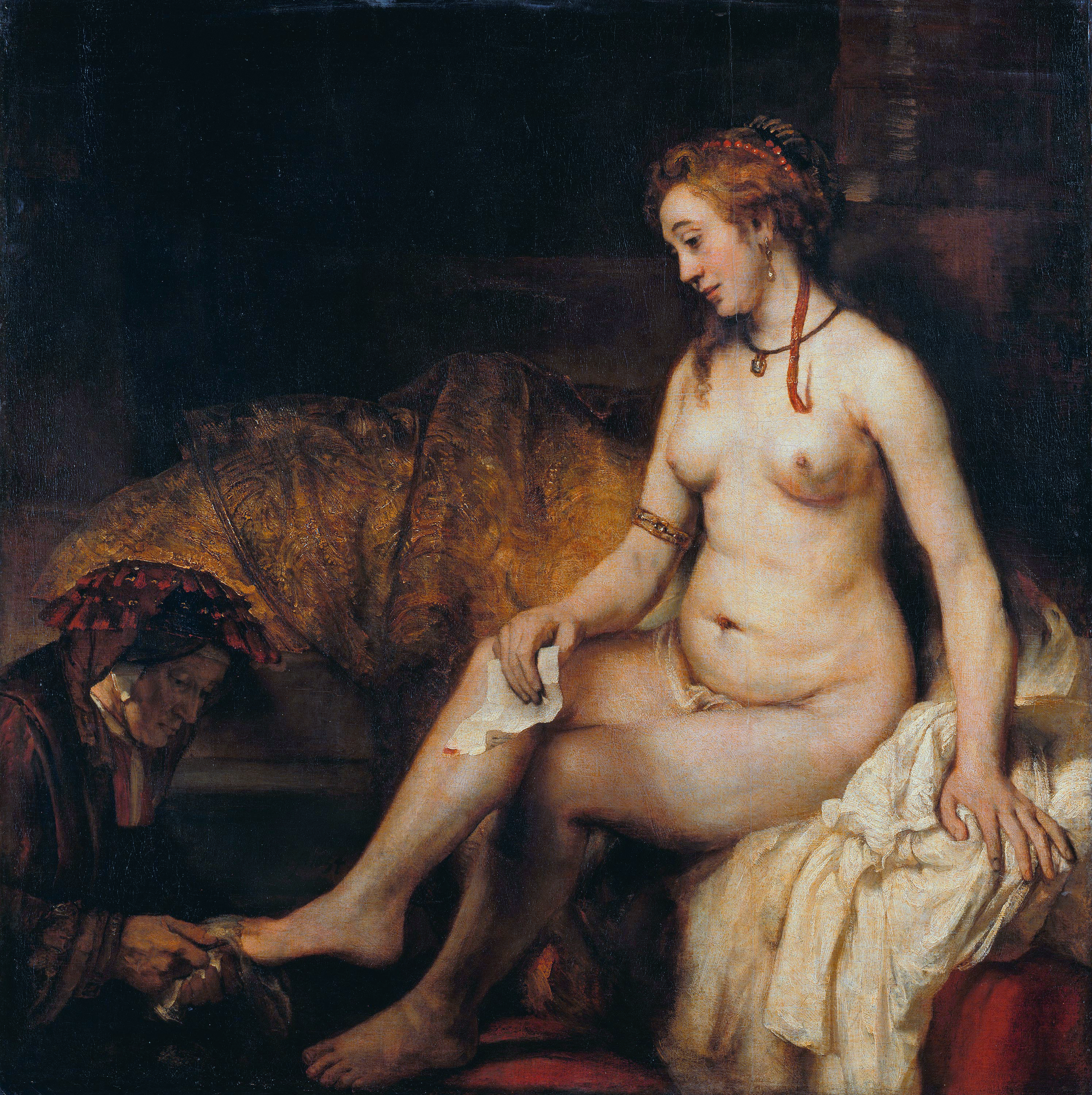
Bathsheba at Her Bath (1654) by Rembrandt

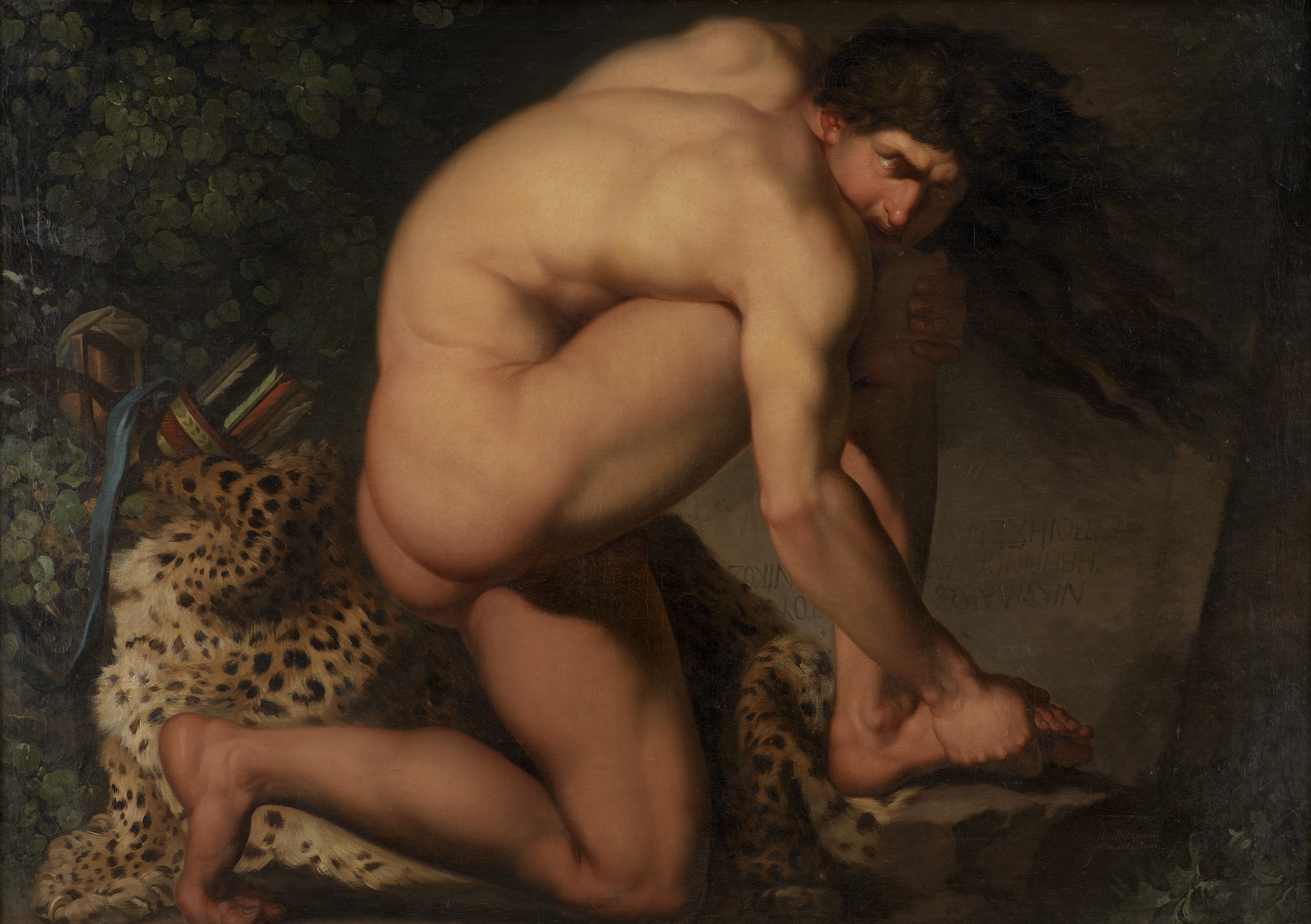
"The Wounded Philoctetes" (1775) by N. A. Abildgaard

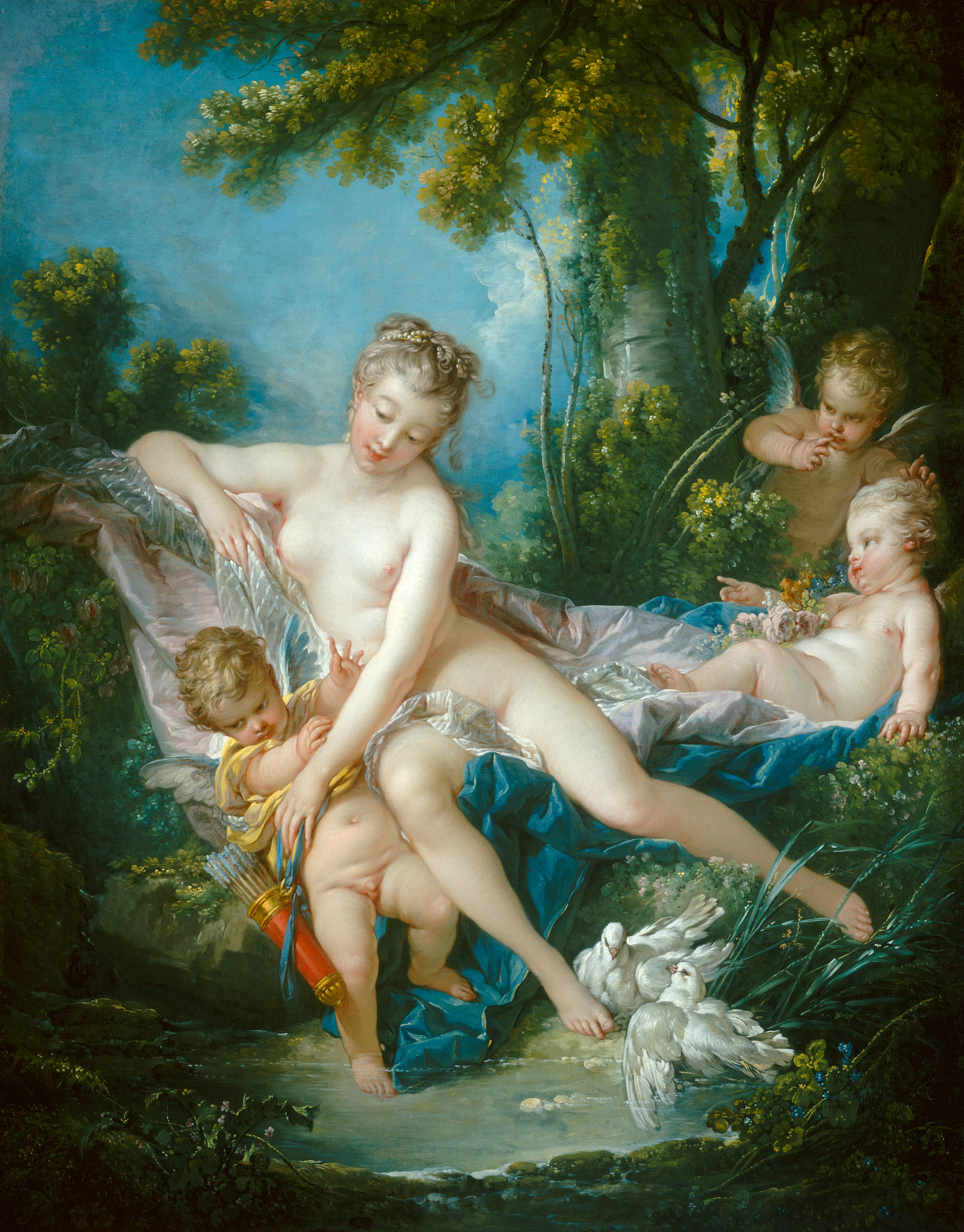
Venus Consoling Love (1751) by François Boucher

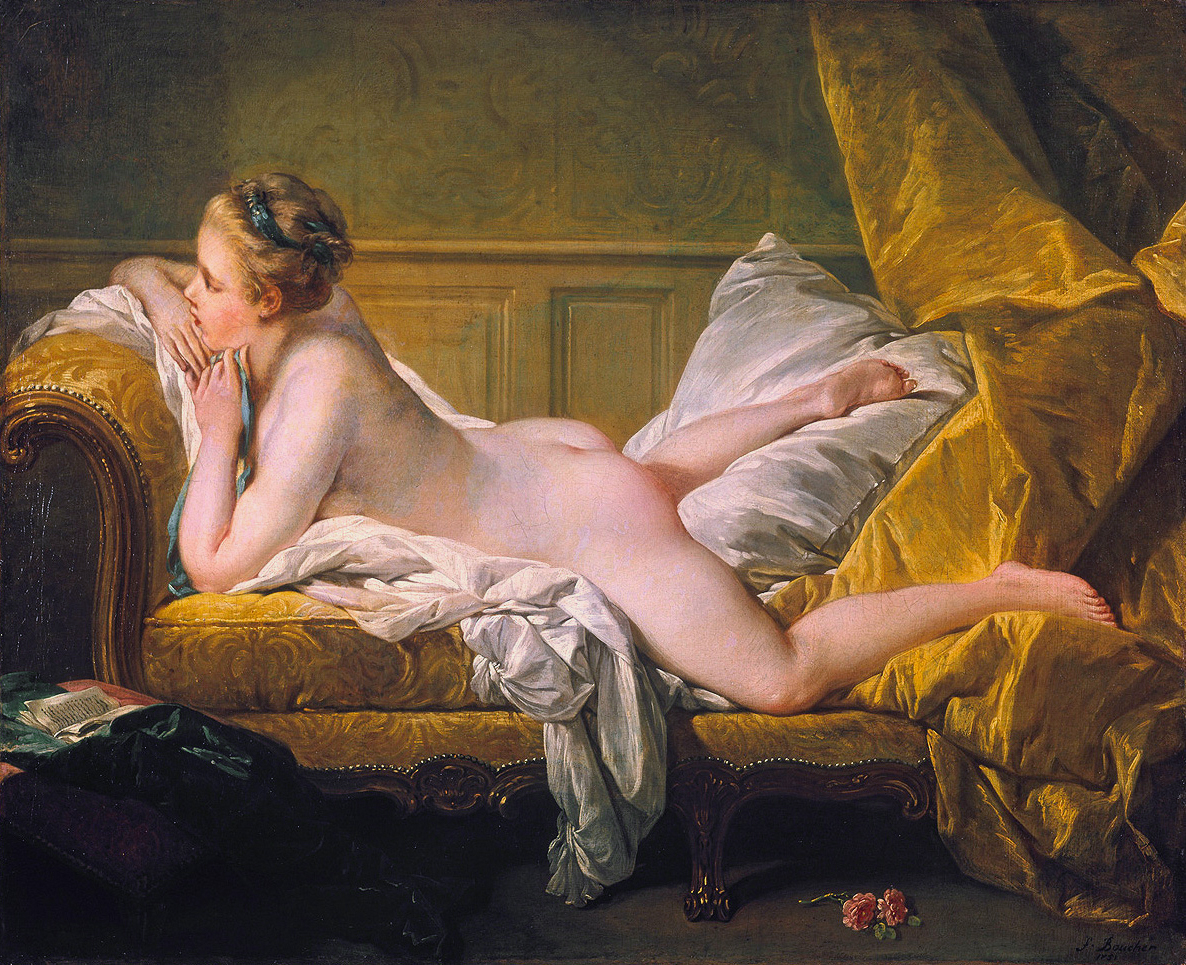
“The Blonde Odalisque” (1751) by François Boucher

In Baroque art, the continuing fascination with classical antiquity influenced artists to renew and expand their approach to the nude, but with more naturalistic, less idealized depictions, perhaps more frequently working from live models. Both genders are represented; the male in the form of heroes such as Hercules and Samson, and female in the form of Venus and the Three Graces. Peter Paul Rubens, who with evident delight painted women of generous figure and radiant flesh, gave his name to the adjective Rubenesque. While adopting the conventions of mythological and Biblical stories, Rembrandt's nudes were less idealized, and painted from life. In the later Baroque or Rococo period, a more decorative and playful style emerged, exemplified by François Boucher's Venus Consoling Love, likely commissioned by Madame de Pompadour.

=== Early modern ===
Early Modern
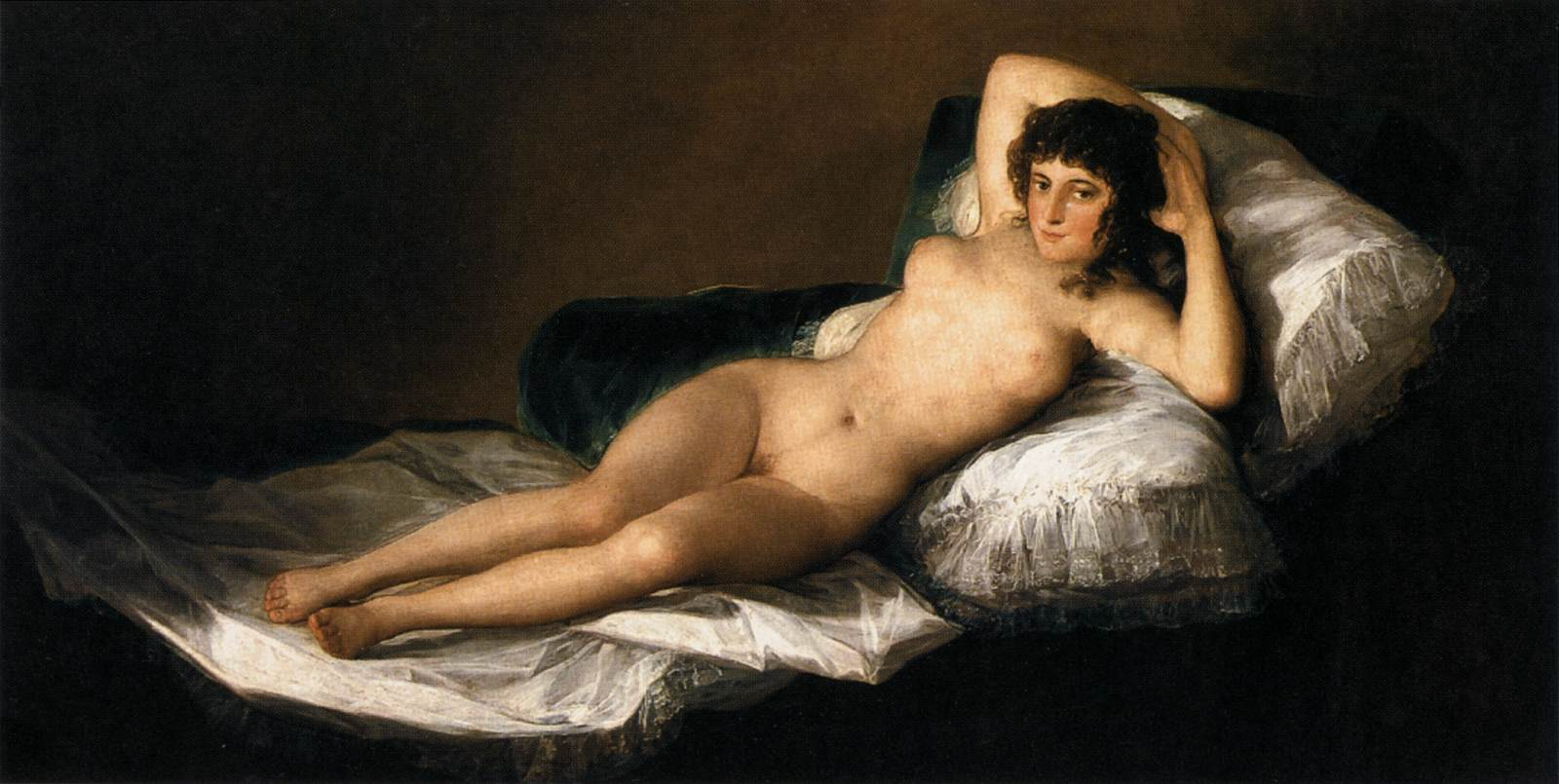
La maja desnuda (The Nude Maja (1797)) by Goya

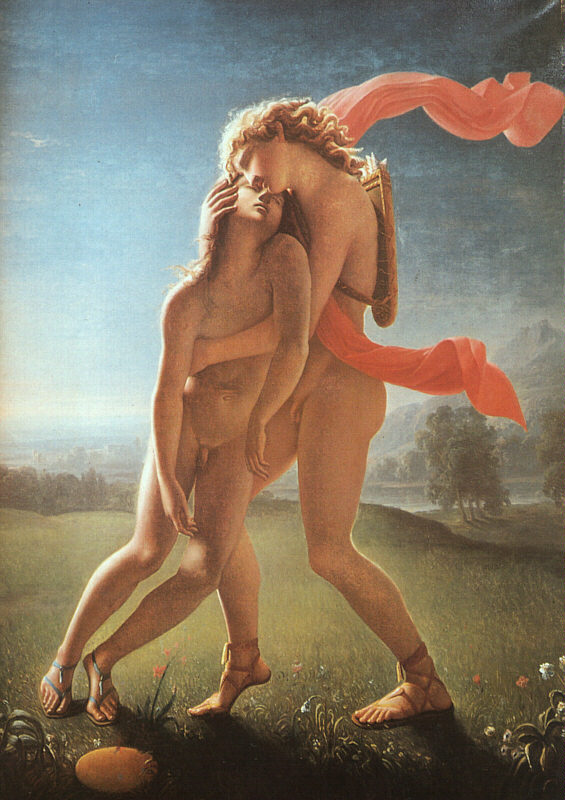
The Death of Hyacinthos (1801) by Jean Broc

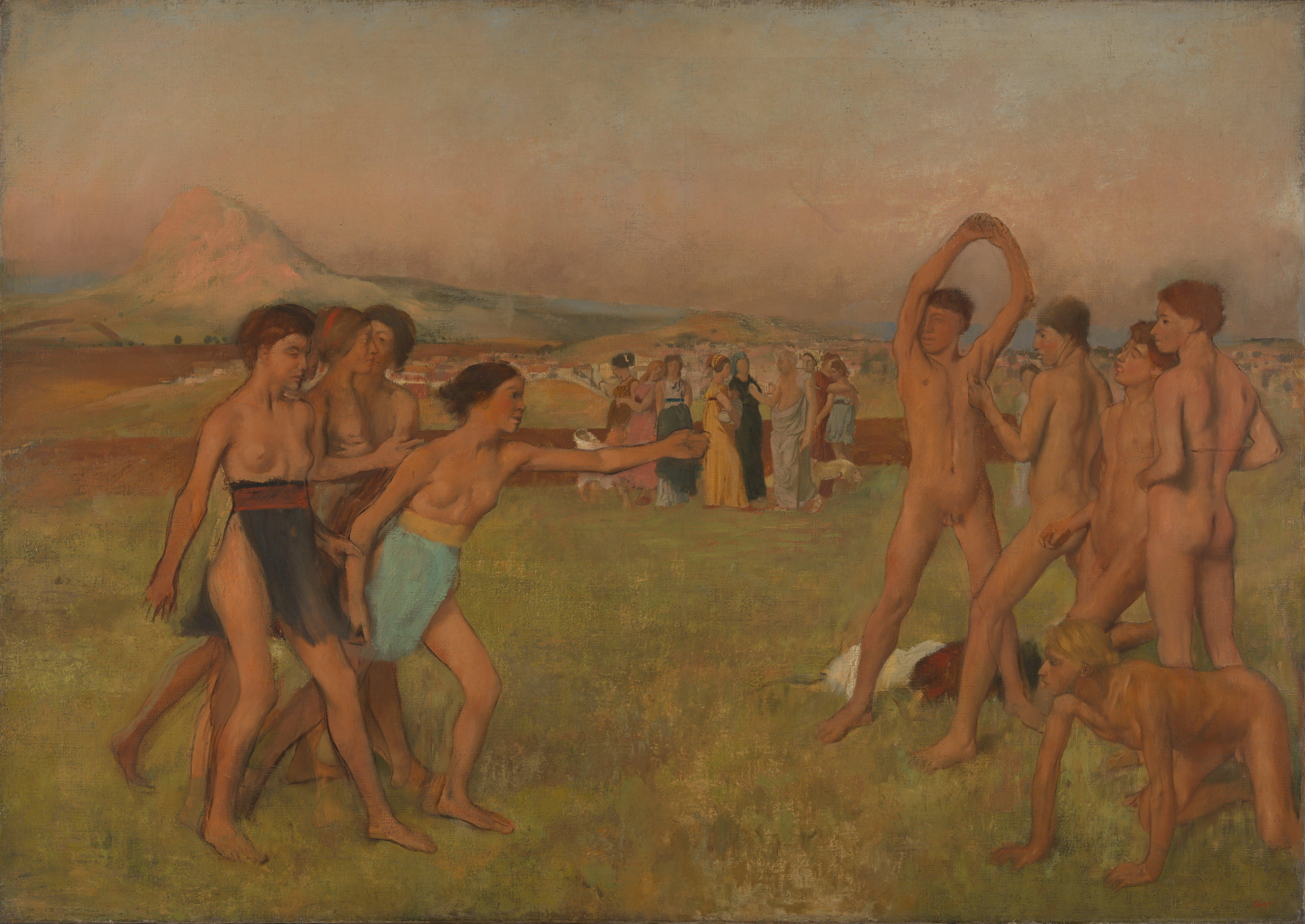
Young Spartans Exercising (1860) by Degas

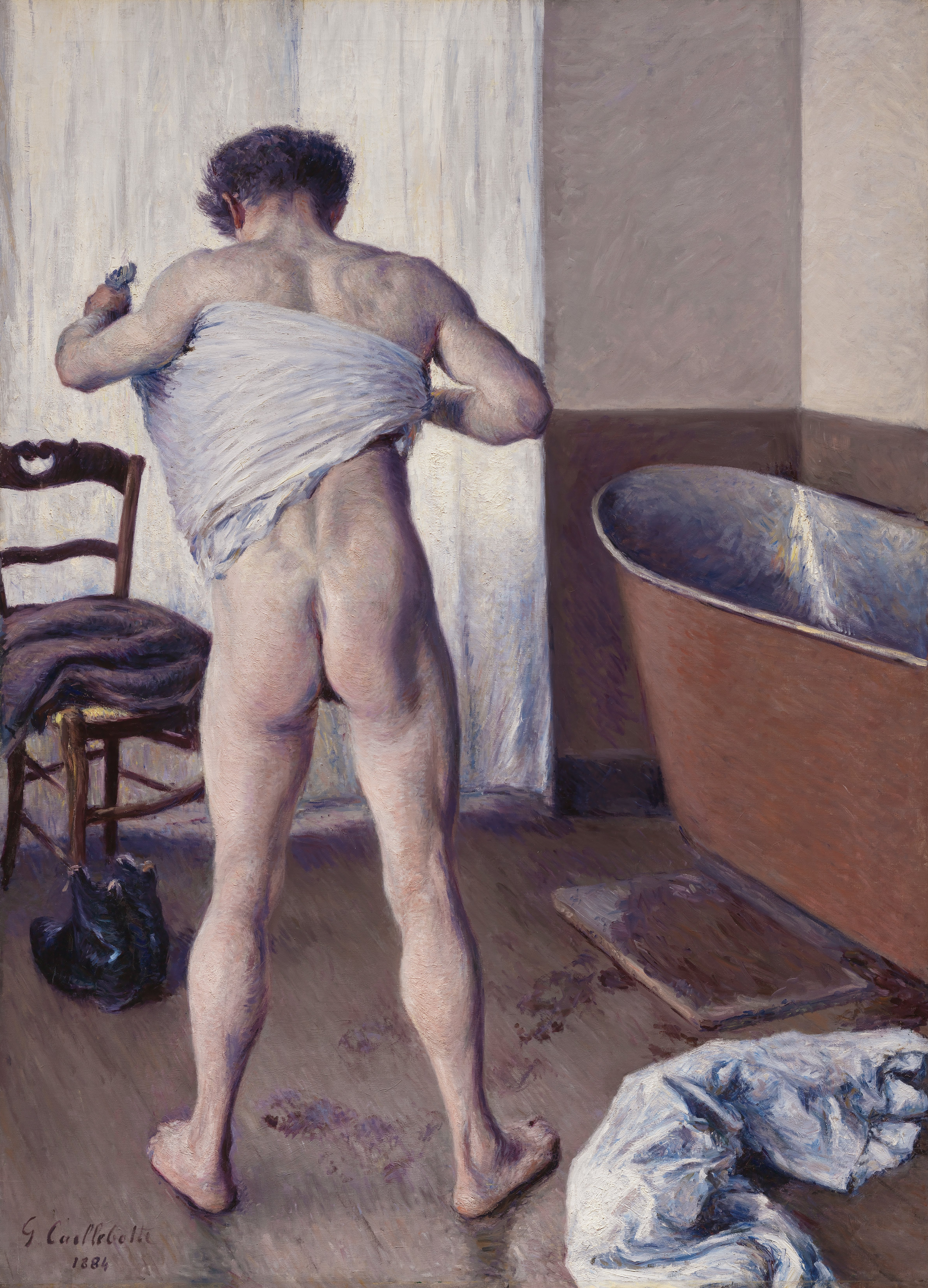
Homme au bain (1869) by Caillebotte

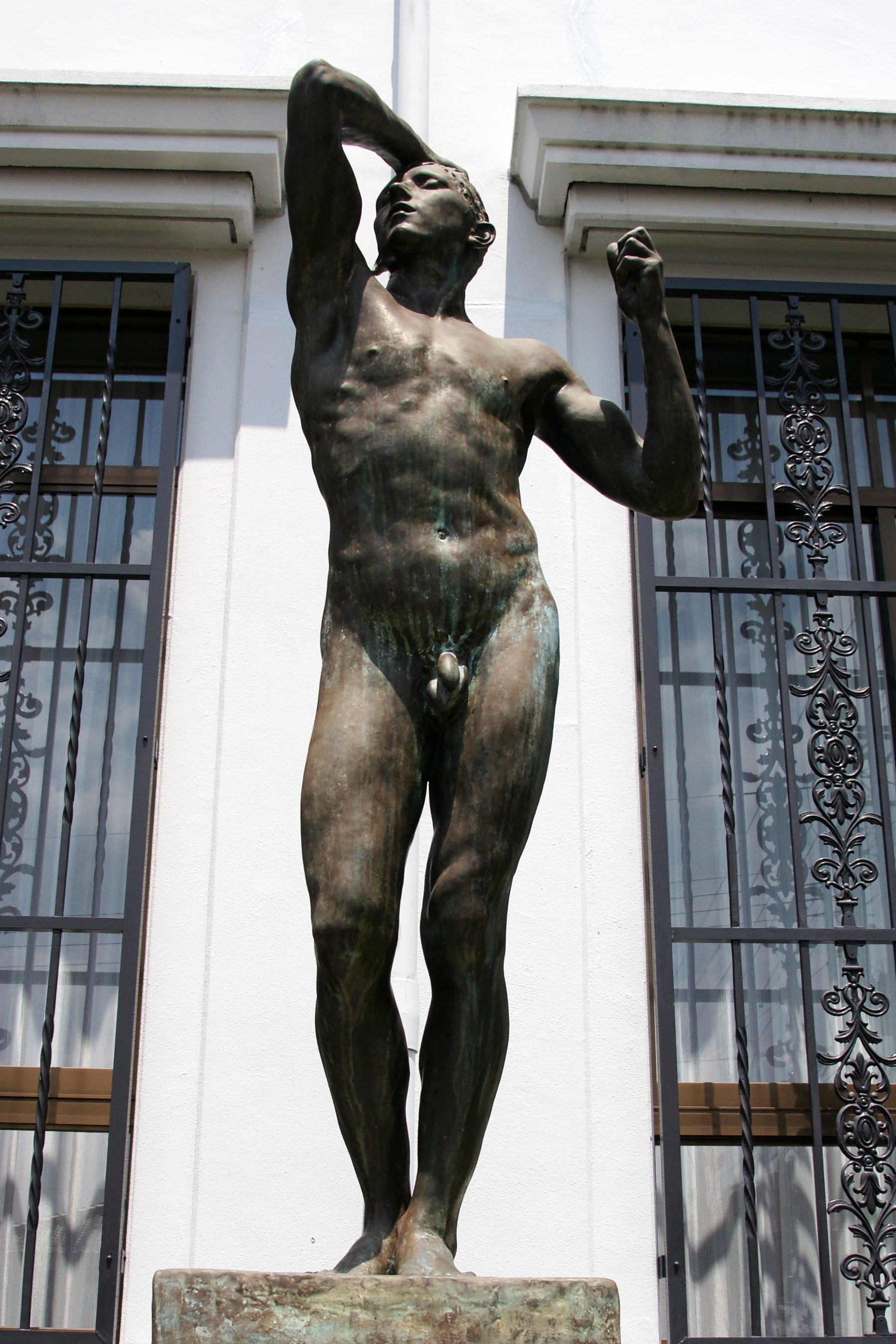
The Age of Bronze (1877) by Rodin, modeled after a Belgian soldier

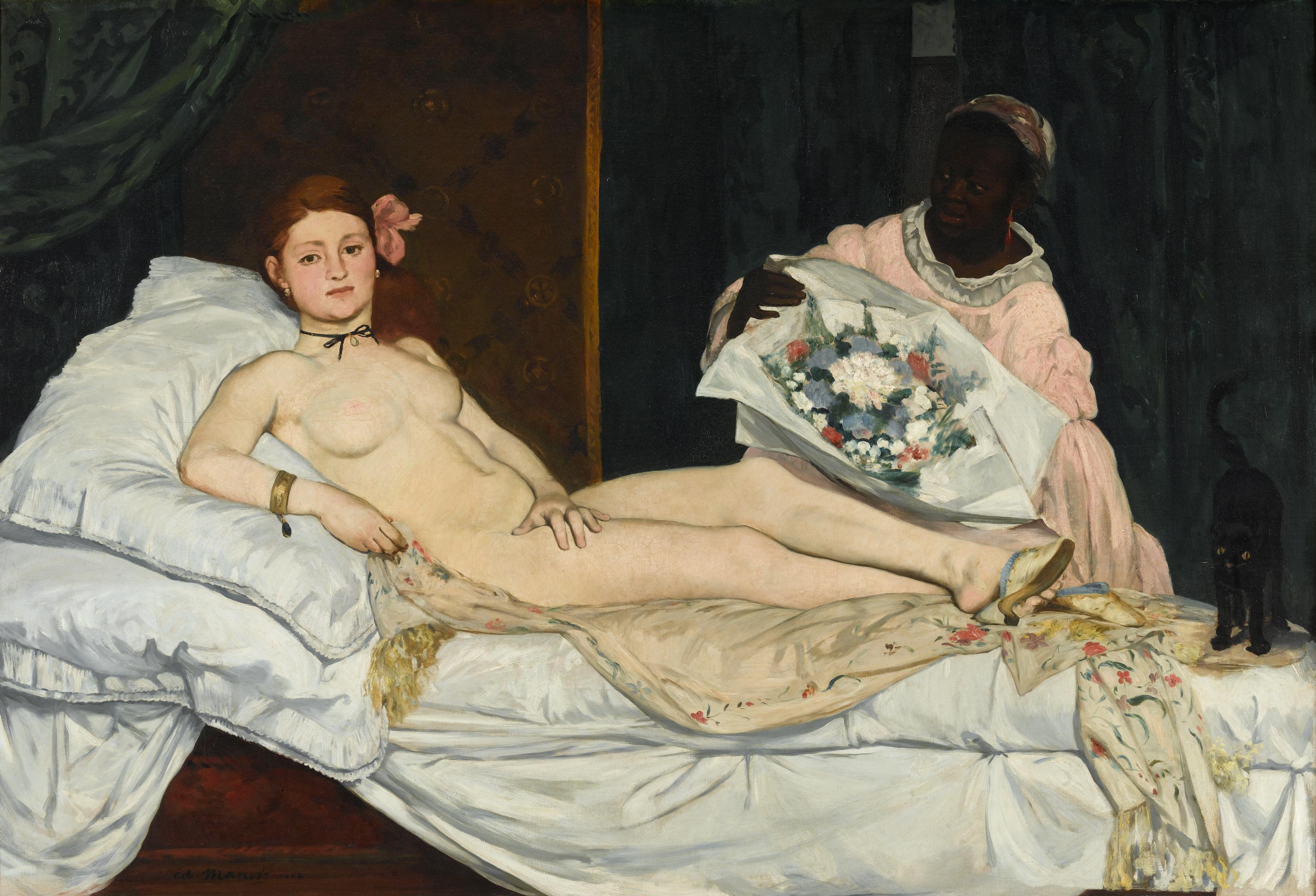
Olympia (1884) by Manet

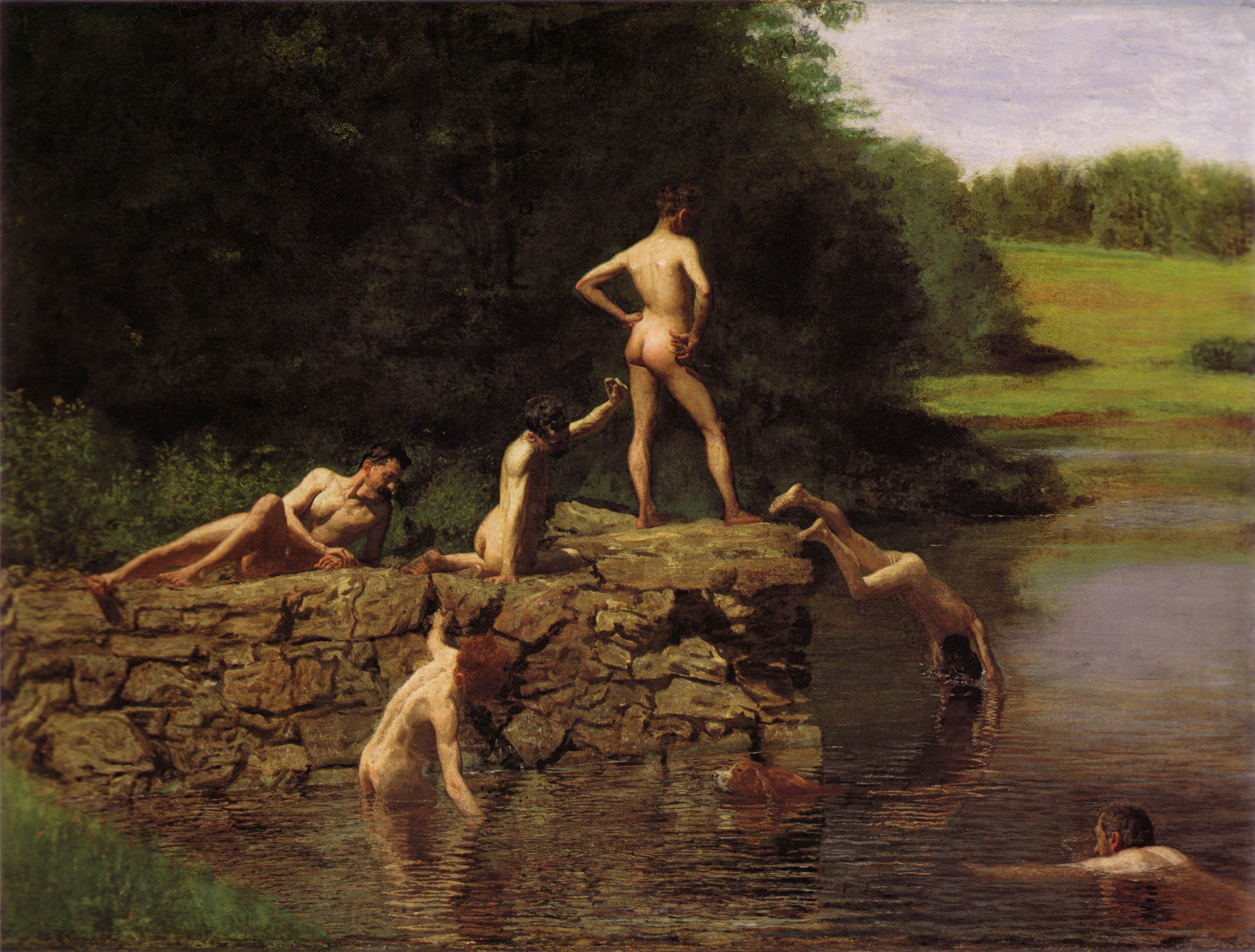
The Swimming Hole (1884–85) by Thomas Eakins

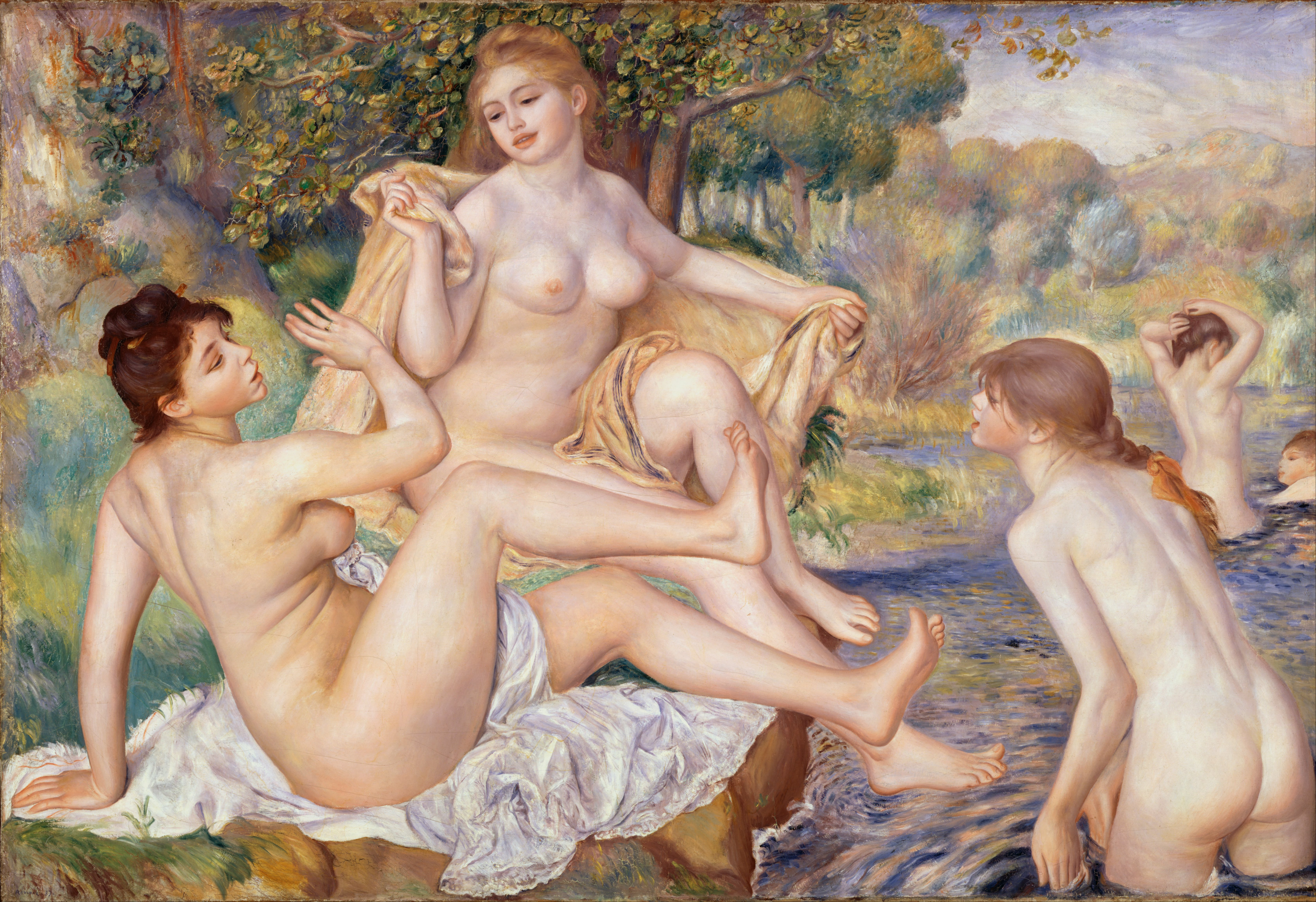
The Large Bathers by Renoir (1884–1887)

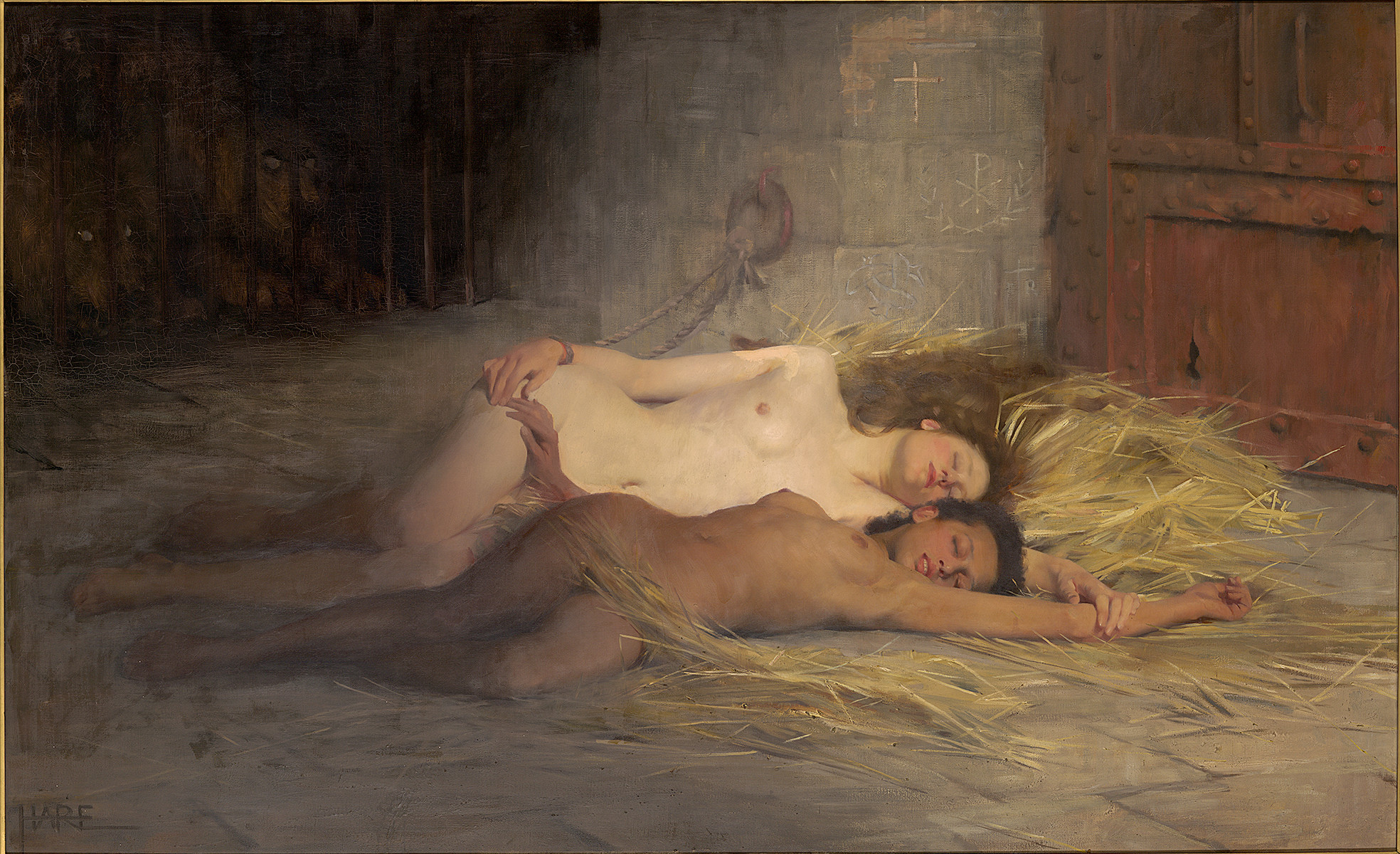
The Victory of Faith (1889) by Saint George Hare

Goya's Nude Maja represent a break with the classical, showing a particular woman of his time, with pubic hair and a look directed at the viewer, rather than an allusion to nymphs or goddesses.

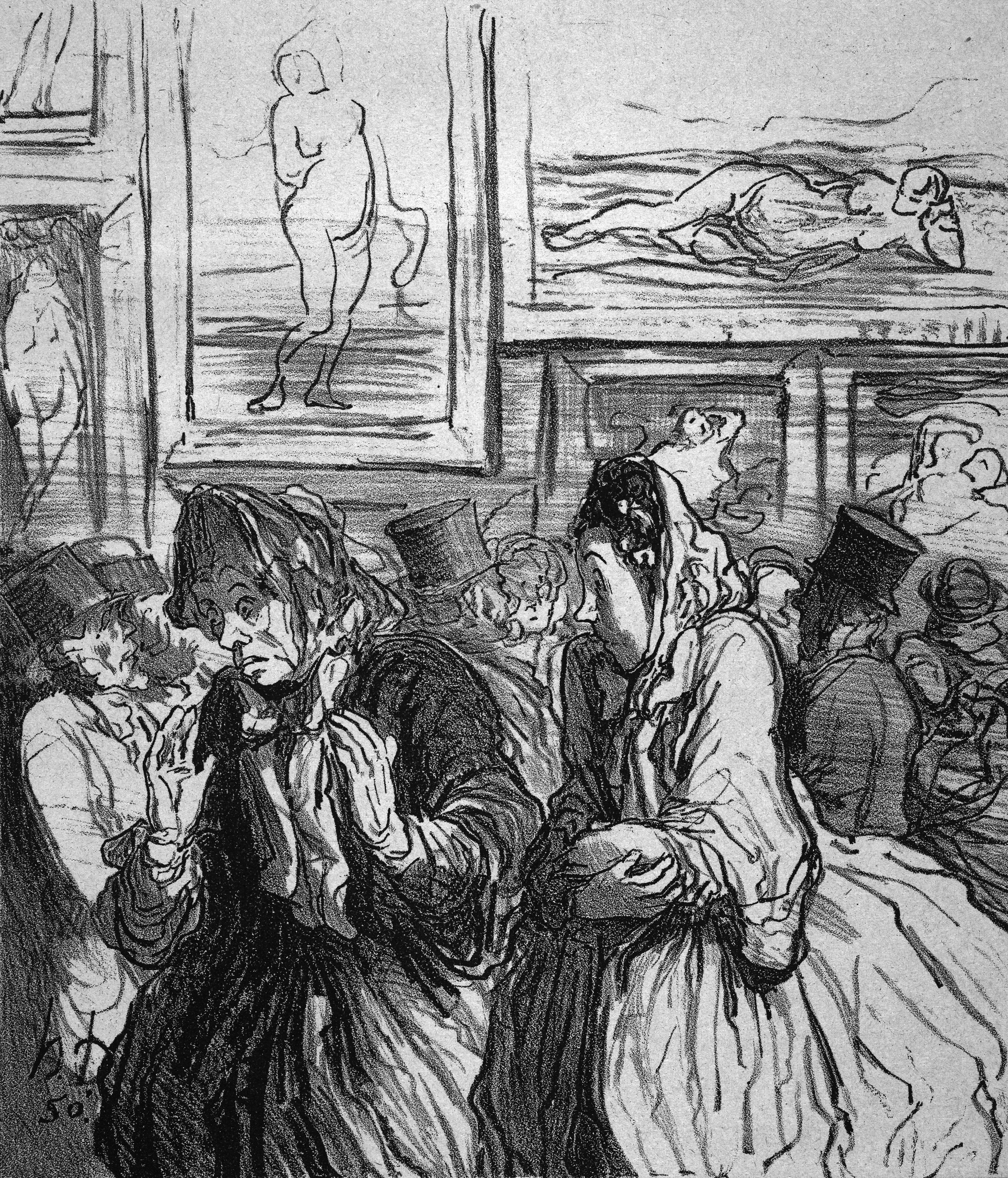
This year Venuses again... always Venuses!... (1864) by Daumier

In the 19th century the Orientalism movement added another reclining female nude to the possible subjects of European paintings, the odalisque, a slave or harem girl. One of the most famous was The Grande Odalisque painted by Ingres in 1814. The annual glut of paintings of idealized nude women in the Paris Salon was satirized by Honoré Daumier in an 1864 lithograph with the caption "This year Venuses again... always Venuses!... as if there really were women built like that!" While Europe accepted the nude in art, America was restrictive of sexuality, which sometimes included criticism or censorship of painting, even those that depicted classical or biblical subjects.

In the later nineteenth century, academic painters continued with classical themes, but were challenged by the Impressionists. While the composition is compared to Titian and Giogione, Édouard Manet shocked the public of his time by painting nude women in contemporary situation in his Le Déjeuner sur l'herbe (1863); and although the pose of his Olympia (1865) is said to derive from the Venus of Urbino by Titian, the public saw a prostitute. Gustave Courbet similarly earned criticism for portraying in his Woman with a Parrot a naked prostitute without vestige of goddess or nymph.

Edgar Degas painted many nudes of women in ordinary circumstances, such as taking a bath. Auguste Rodin challenged classical canons of idealization in his expressively distorted Adam. With the invention of photography, artists began using the new medium as a source for paintings, Eugène Delacroix being one of the first.

For Lynda Nead, the female nude is a matter of containing sexuality; in the case of the classical art history view represented by Kenneth Clark, this is about idealization and de-emphasis of overt sexuality, while the modern view recognizes that the human body is messy, unbounded, and problematical. If a virtuous woman is dependent and weak, as was assumed by the images in classical art, then a strong, independent woman could not be portrayed as virtuous.

=== Late modern ===
Although both the Academic tradition and Impressionists lost their cultural supremacy at the beginning of the twentieth century, the nude remained although transformed by the ideas of modernism. The idealized Venus was replaced by the woman intimately depicted in private settings, as in the work of Egon Schiele. The simplified modern forms of Jean Metzinger, Amedeo Modigliani, Gaston Lachaise and Aristide Maillol recall the original goddesses of fertility more than Greek goddesses. In early abstract paintings, the body could be fragmented or dismembered, as in Picasso's Les Demoiselles d'Avignon or his structuralist and Cubist nudes, but there are also abstracted versions of classical themes, such as Henri Matisse's dancers and bathers.

Late modern
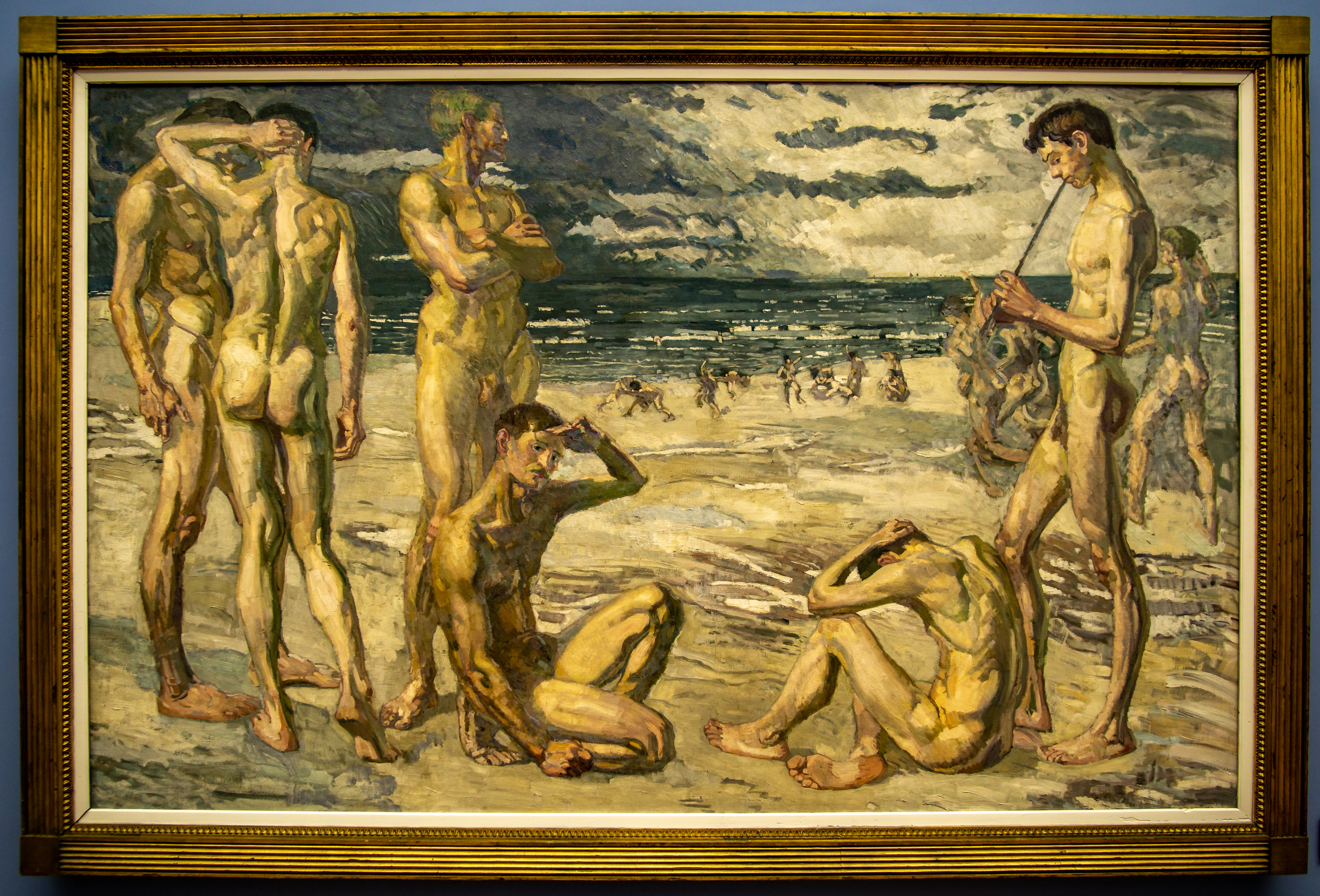
Young Men by the Sea (1905) by Max Beckmann

La danse (Bacchante) (1906) by Jean Metzinger

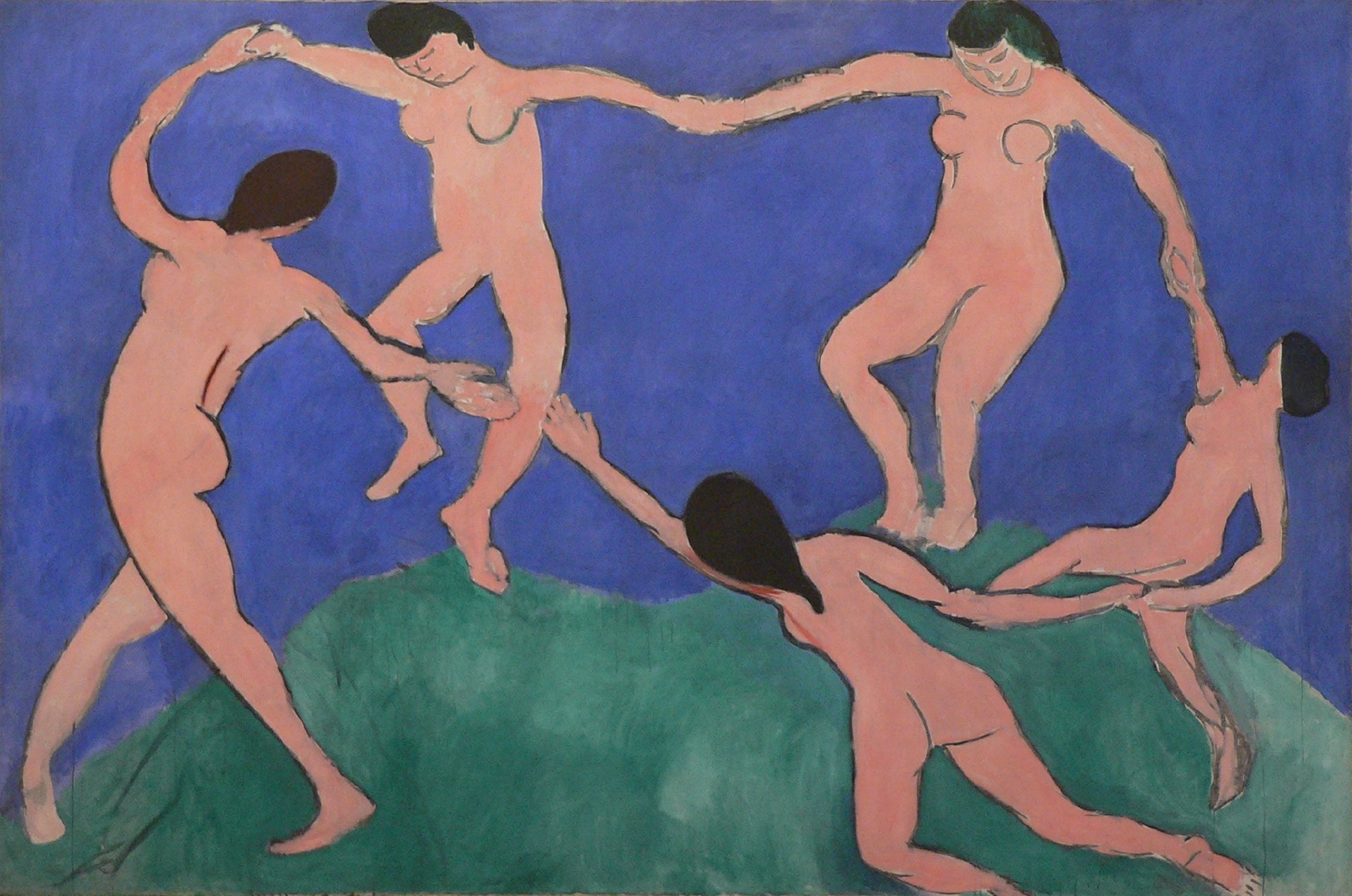
La danse (1909) by Henri Matisse

Nu (Nu debout) (1911) by Jean Metzinger

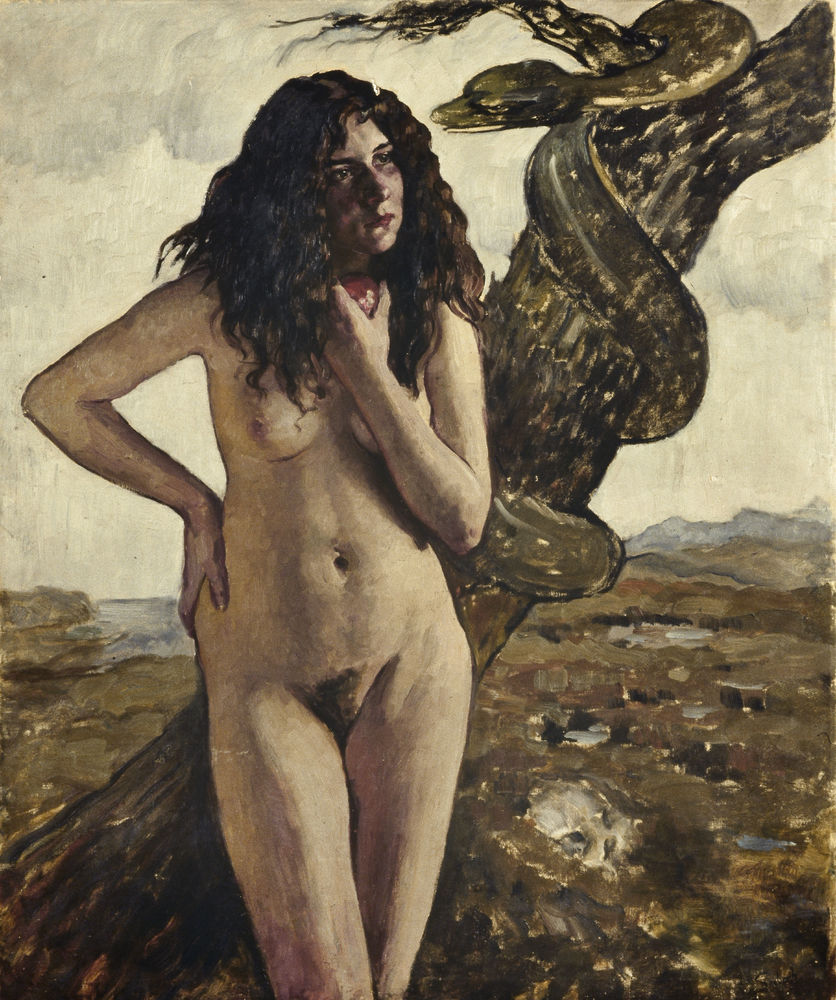
The Temptation (1912) by Lothar von Seebach

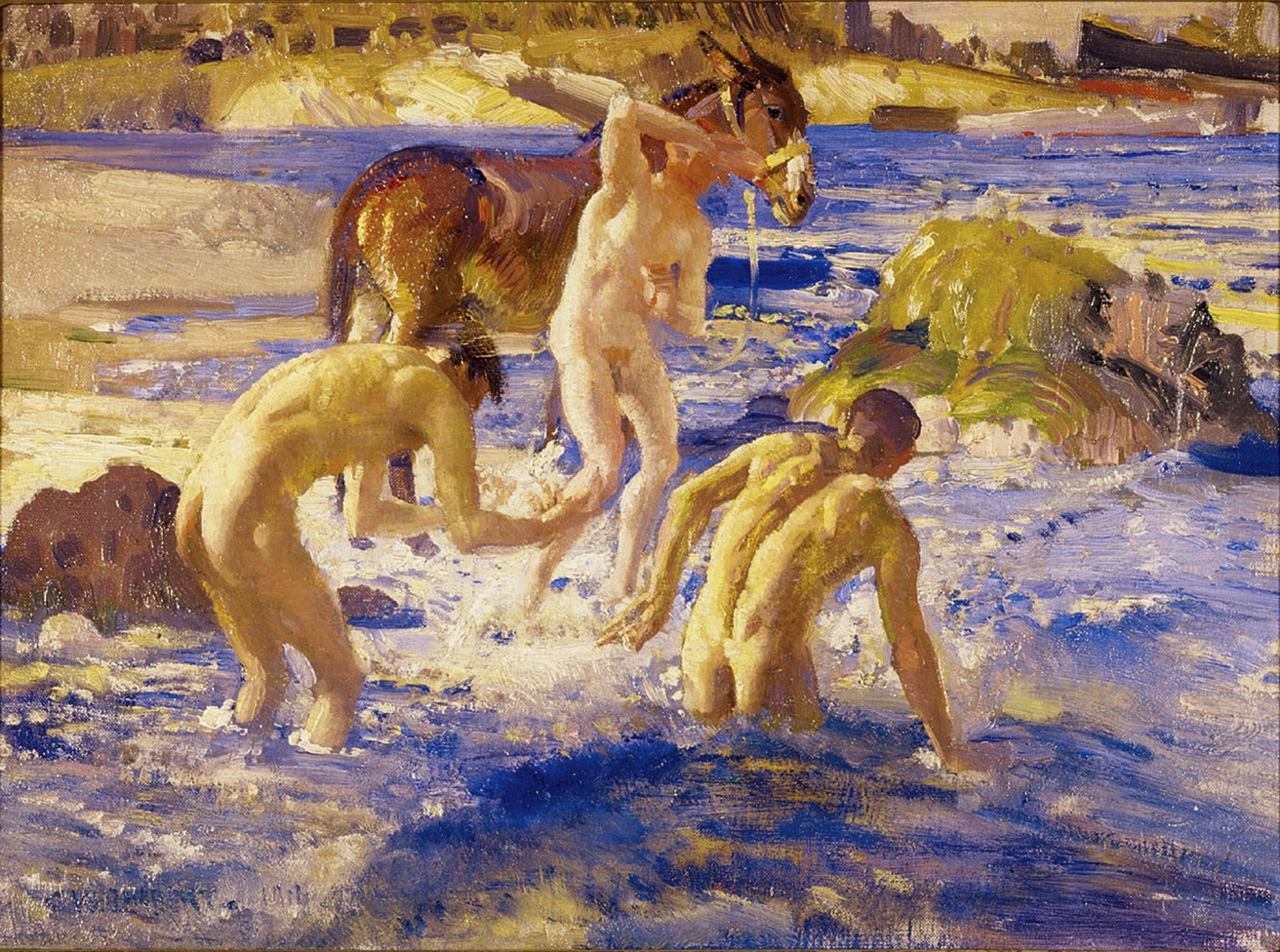
Anzacs Bathing (1912) by George Washington Lambert

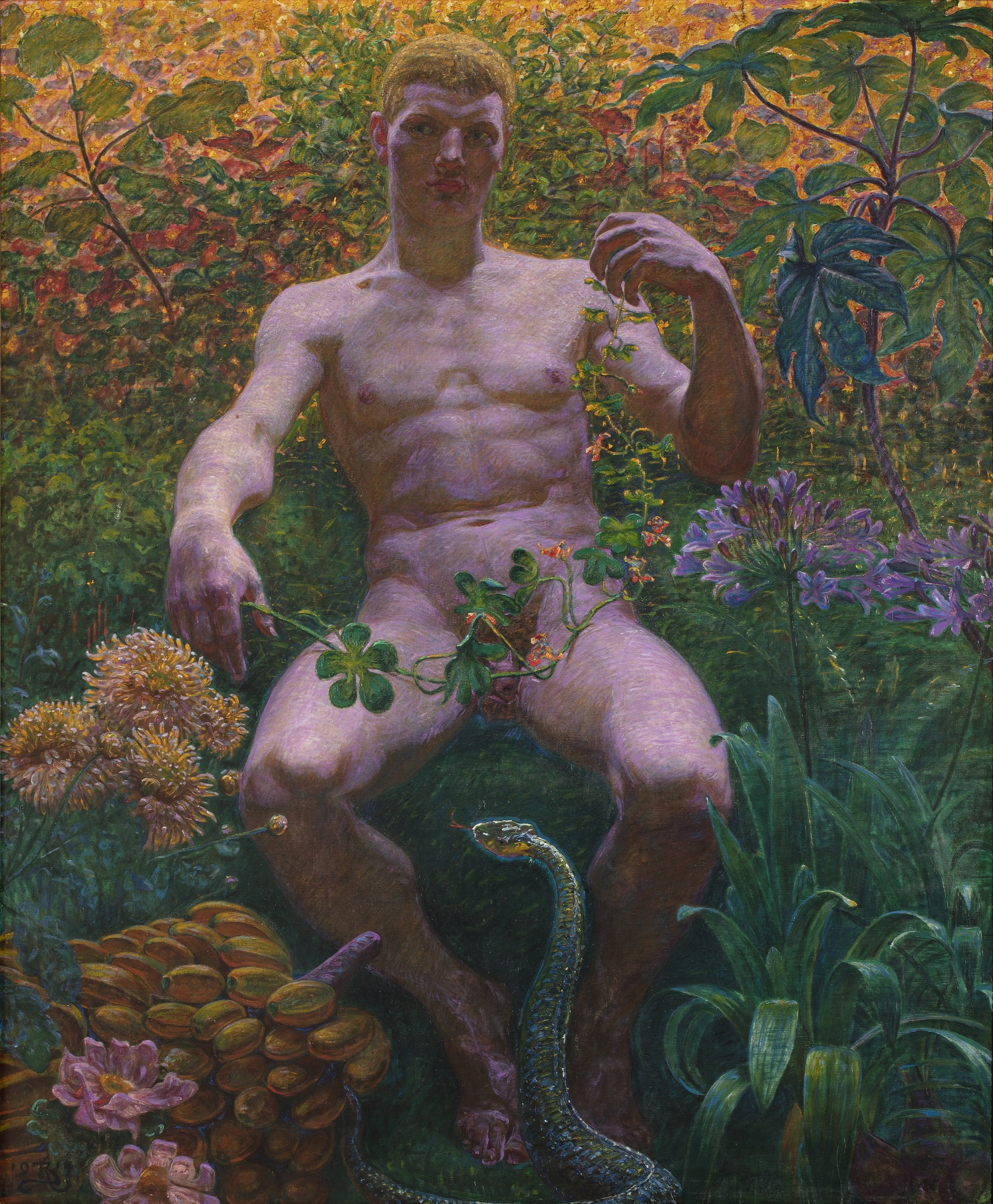
Adam in Paradise (1914) by Kristian Zahrtmann

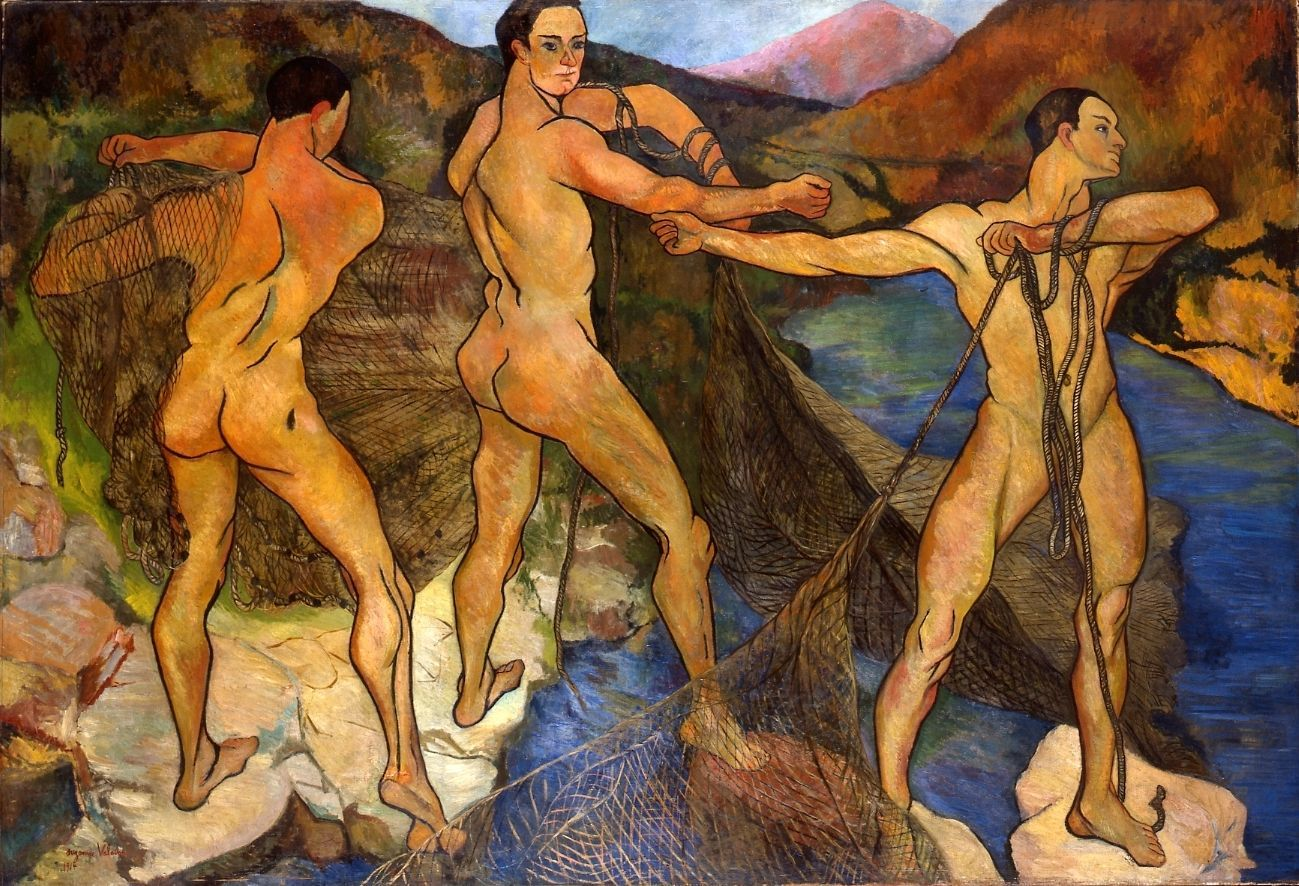
Casting the Net (1914) by Suzanne Valadon

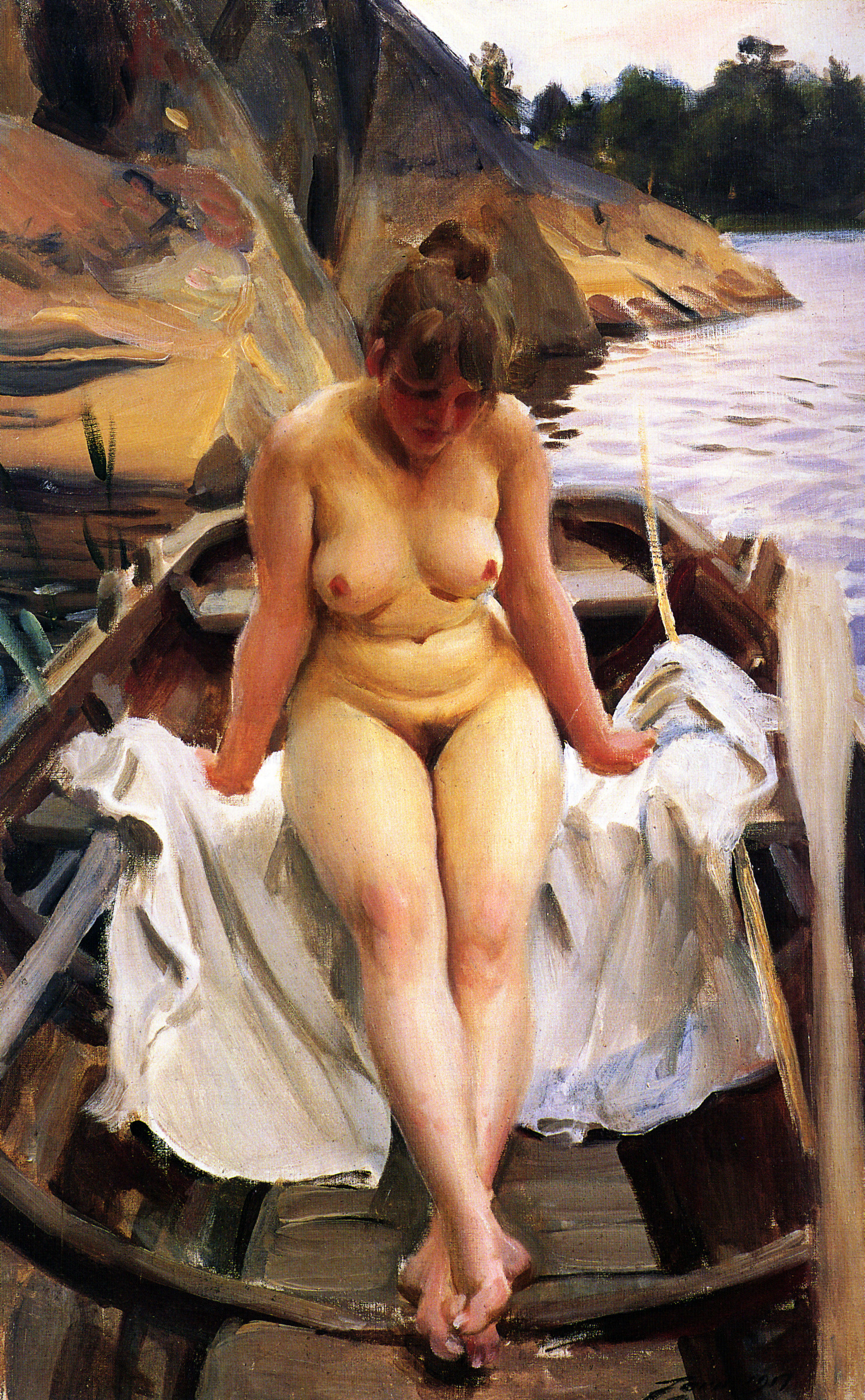
I Werners Eka (In Werner's Rowing Boat) (1917) by Anders Zorn

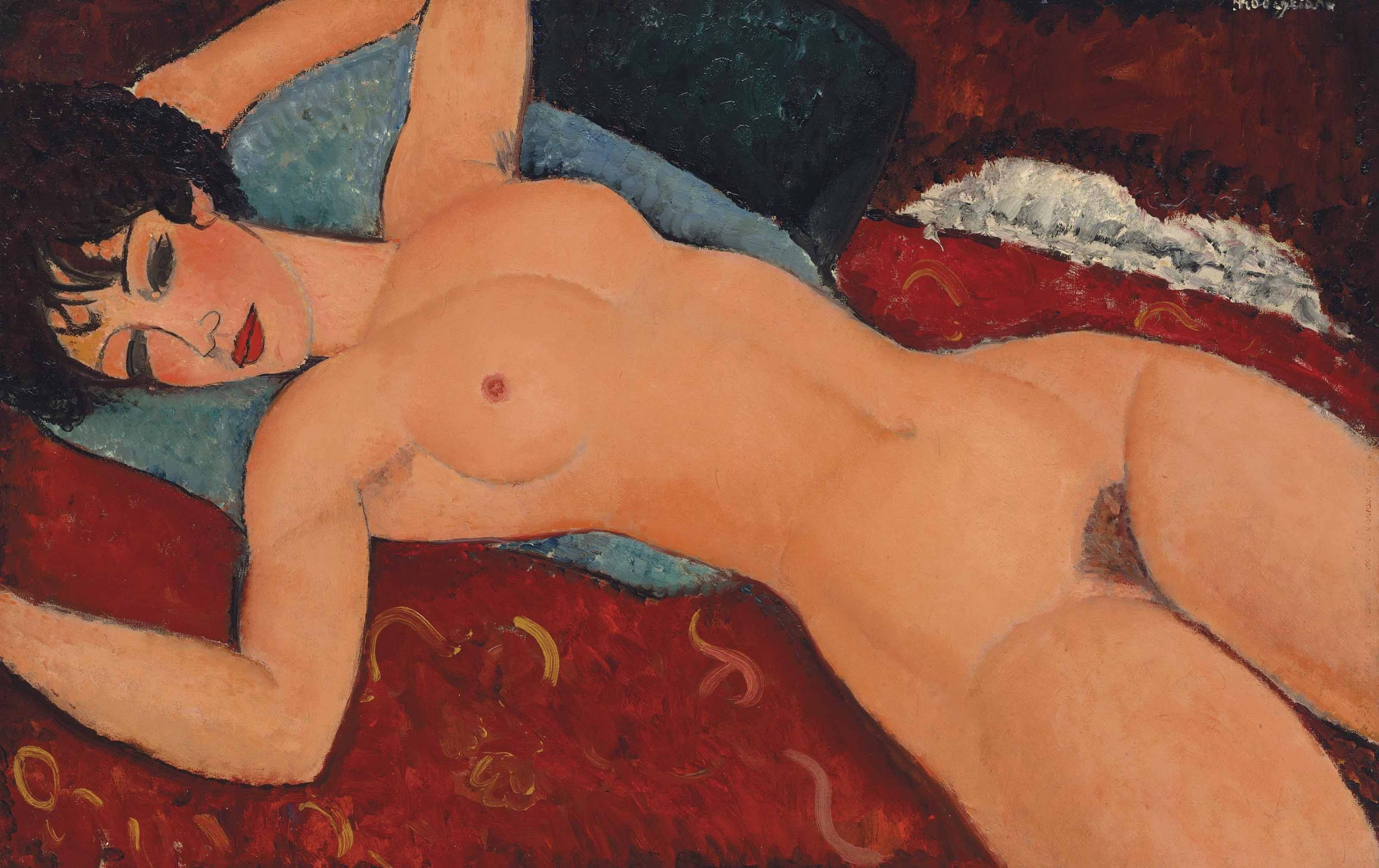
Red Nude (1917) by Amedeo Modigliani

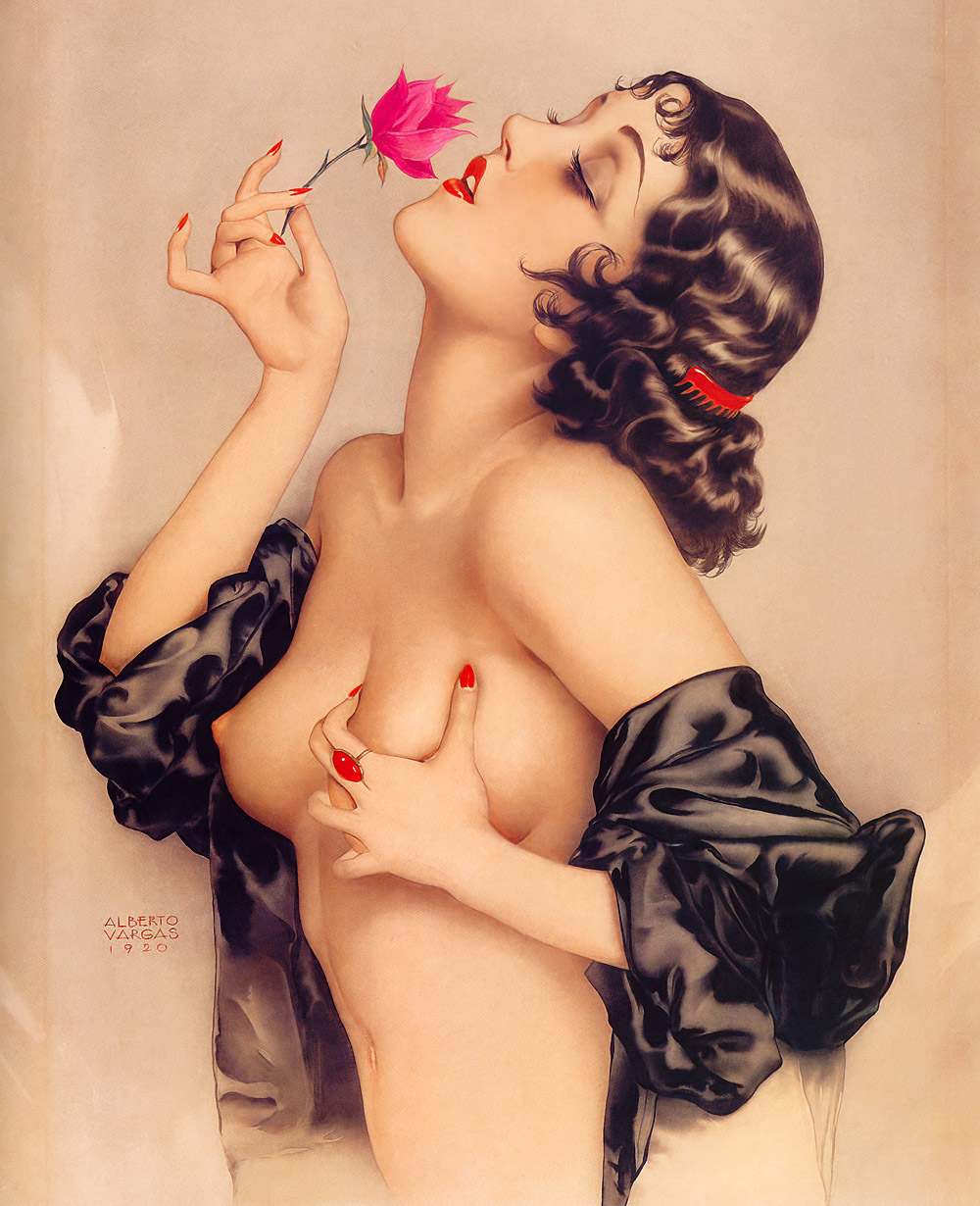
Memories of Olive (1920) by Alberto Vargas

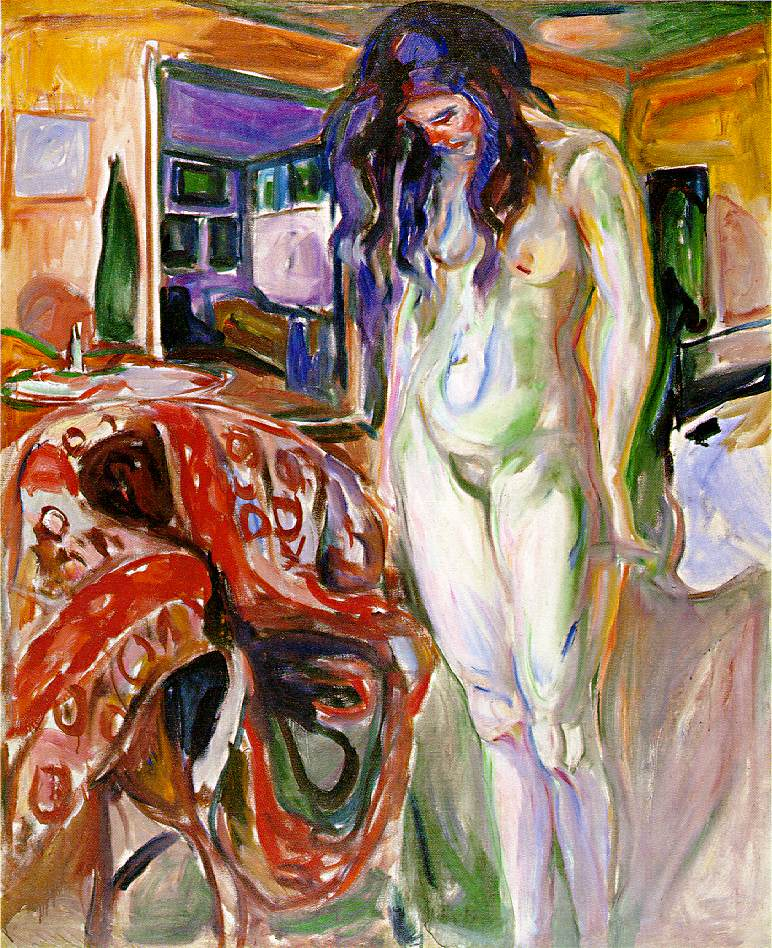
Model by the Wicker Chair (1919-1921) by Edvard Munch

Suzanne Valadon was one of relatively few female artists in the early 20th century to paint female nudes, as well as male nudes. In 1916, she painted Nude Arranging her Hair, which depicts a woman carrying out a mundane task in a frank, un-sexualised and non-erotic way.

In the post-WWII era, Abstract Expressionism moved the center of Western art from Paris to New York City. One of the primary influences in the rise of abstraction, the critic Clement Greenberg, had supported de Kooning's early abstract work. Despite Greenberg's advice, the artist, who had begun as a figurative painter, returned to the human form in early 1950 with his Woman series. Although having some references to the traditions of single female figures, the women were portrayed as voracious, distorted, and semi-abstract. According to the artist, he wanted to "create the angry humor of tragedy"; having the frantic look of the atomic age, a world in turmoil, a world in need of comic relief. Later, de Kooning added that "Maybe ... I was painting the woman in me. Art isn't a wholly masculine occupation, you know. I'm aware that some critics would take this to be an admission of latent homosexuality ... If I painted beautiful women, would that make me a non-homosexual? I like beautiful women. In the flesh—even the models in magazines. Women irritate me sometimes. I painted that irritation in the Woman series. That's all." Such ideas could not be expressed by pure abstraction alone. Some critics, however, see the Woman series as misogynistic.

Other New York artists of this period retained the figure as their primary subject. Alice Neel painted nudes, including her own self-portrait, in the same straightforward style as clothed sitters, being primarily concerned with color and emotional content. Philip Pearlstein uses unique cropping and perspective to explore the abstract qualities of nudes. As a young artist in the 1950s, Pearlstein exhibited both abstracts and figures, but it was de Kooning that advised him to continue with figurative work.

=== Contemporary ===
Benefits Supervisor Sleeping (1995) "I paint people, not because of what they are like, not exactly in spite of what they are like, but how they happen to be." – Lucian Freud

Lucian Freud was one of a small group of painters which included Francis Bacon who came to be known as "The School of London", creating figurative work in the 1970s when it was unfashionable. However, by the end of his life his works had become icons of the Postmodern era, depicting the human body without a trace of idealization, as in his series working with an obese model. One of Freud's works is entitled Naked Portrait, which implies a realistic image of a particular unclothed woman rather than a conventional nude. In Freud's obituary in The New York Times, it is stated: His "stark and revealing paintings of friends and intimates, splayed nude in his studio, recast the art of portraiture and offered a new approach to figurative art".

Around 1970, from feminist principles, Sylvia Sleigh painted a series of works reversing stereotypical artistic themes by featuring naked men in poses usually associated with women.

The paintings of Jenny Saville include family and self-portraits among other nudes; often done in extreme perspectives, attempting to balance realism with abstraction; all while expressing how a woman feels about the female nude. Lisa Yuskavage's nude figures painted in a nearly academic manner constitute a "parody of art historical nudity and the male obsession with the female form as object". John Currin is another painter whose work frequently reinterprets historic nudes. Cecily Brown's paintings combine figurative elements and abstraction in a style reminiscent of de Kooning.

The end of the twentieth century saw the rise of new media and approaches to art, although they began much earlier. In particular installation art often includes images of the human body, and performance art frequently includes nudity. Cut Piece by Yoko Ono was first performed in 1964 (then known as a "happening"). Audience members were requested to come on stage and begin cutting away her clothing until she was nearly naked. Several contemporary performance artists such as Marina Abramović, Vanessa Beecroft and Carolee Schneemann use their own nude bodies or other performers in their work.

The male nude also became a subject of explicit artistic inquiry in this period. Andy Warhol's Sex Parts series (1977–78), a portfolio of six screenprints depicting male genitalia, occupied an uneasy position between fine art and pornography; Warhol referred to the subjects in his diaries as "landscapes," and according to studio manager Vincent Fremont, "the galleries were scared to show them." The series has since been interpreted as a significant affirmation of Warhol's homosexuality, and is held in the permanent collection of The Andy Warhol Museum. Russian-American photographer Alexander Kargaltsev's Asylum (2012) presented large-format nude portraits of gay Russian men who had sought political refuge in the United States. Curator Ivan Savvine described the subjects as "not nude but naked", consciously invoking Kenneth Clark's distinction, because "they had the courage to shed the many layers of fear and come out to the world uncovered, vulnerable, yet proud."

== Issues ==
=== Depictions of youth ===
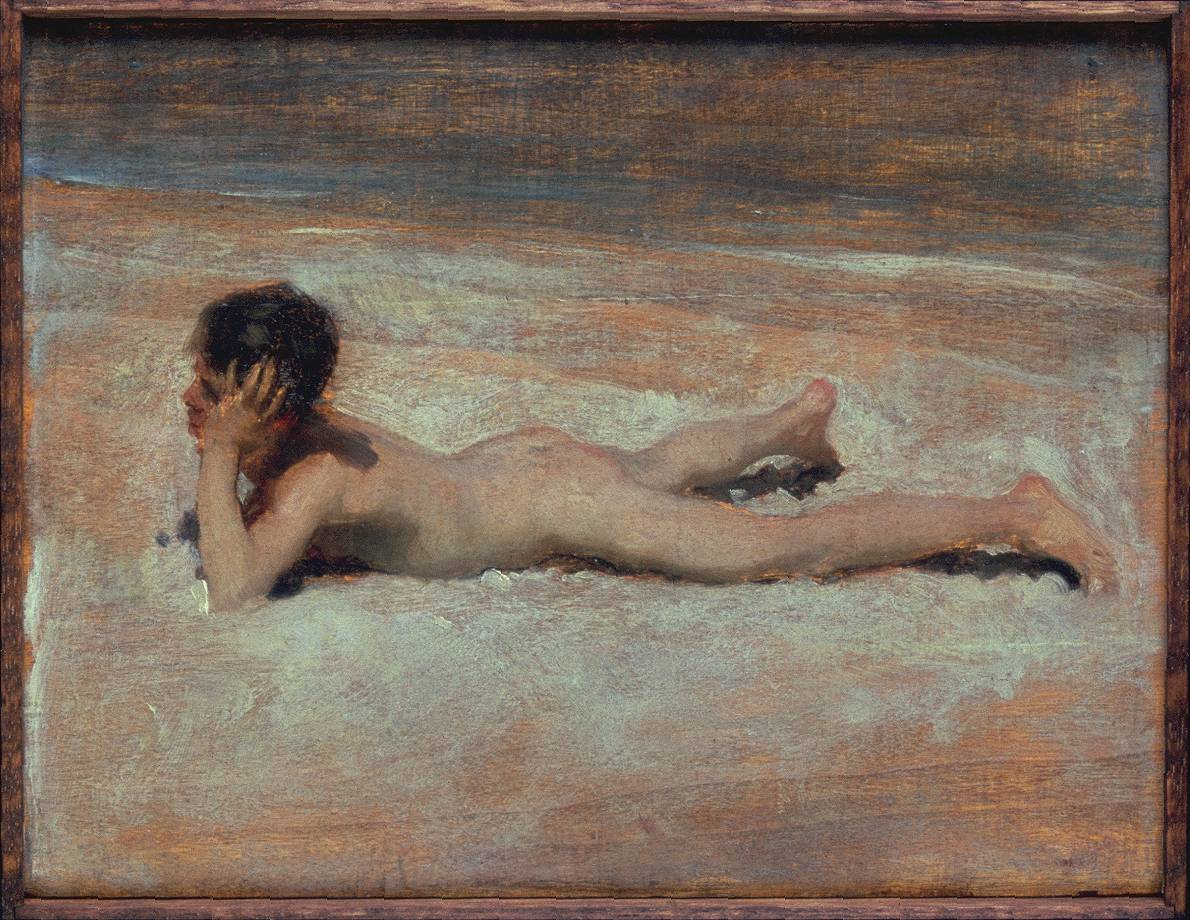
A Nude Boy on a Beach (1878) by John Singer Sargent

In classical works, nude children were rarely shown except for babies and putti. Before the era of Freudian psychoanalysis, children were assumed to have no sexual feelings before puberty, so nude children were shown as symbols of pure innocence. Boys often swam naked, which was depicted in modern paintings by John Singer Sargent, George Bellows, and others. Other images were more erotic, either symbolically or explicitly.

=== Gender differences ===
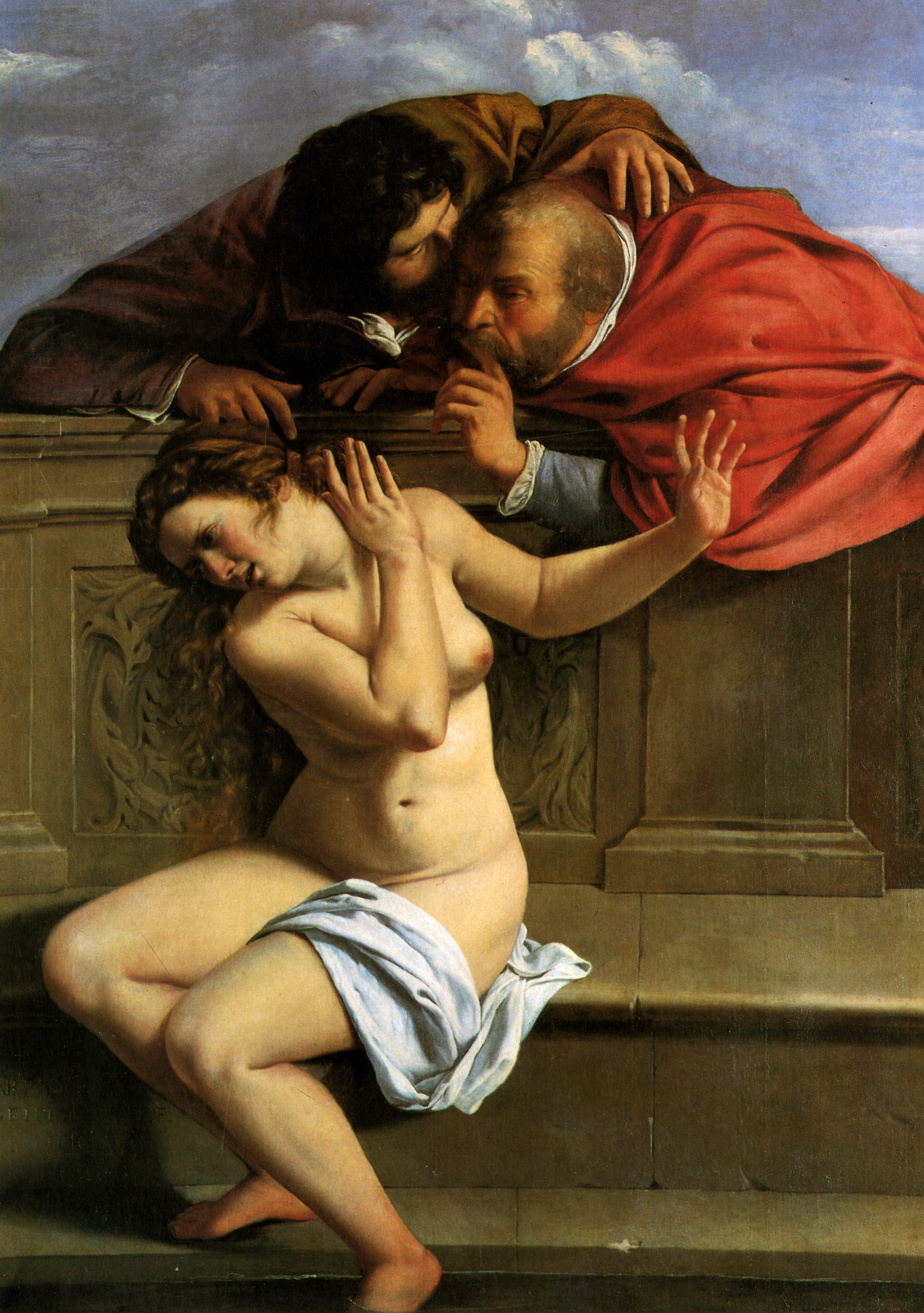
Susanna and the Elders, 1610, Artemisia Gentileschi. This work may be compared with male depictions of the same tale.

Representation of the world, like the world itself, is the work of men; they describe it from their own point of view, which they confuse with absolute truth.

— Simone de Beauvoir, The Second Sex

Men and women did not receive equal opportunities in artistic training from at least the Renaissance until the middle of the nineteenth century. Women artists were not allowed access to nude models and could not participate in this part of the arts education. During this period, study of the nude figure was something all male artists were expected to go through to become an artist of worth and to be able to depict historical subjects.

Academic art history tends to ignore the sexuality of the male nude, speaking instead of form and composition.

For much of history, nude men represented martyrs and warriors, emphasizing an active role rather than the passive one assigned to women in art. Alice Neel and Lucian Freud painted the modern male nude in the classic reclining pose, with the genitals prominently displayed. Sylvia Sleigh painted versions of classic works with the genders reversed.

Until the 1960s, art history and criticism rarely reflected anything other than the male point of view. The feminist art movement began to change this, but one of the first widely known statements of the political messages in nudity was made in 1972 by the art critic John Berger. In Ways of Seeing, he argued that female nudes reflected and reinforced the prevailing power relationship between females portrayed in art and the predominantly male audience. A year later Laura Mulvey wrote Visual Pleasure and Narrative Cinema, in which she applied to film theory the concept of the male gaze, asserting that all nudes are inherently voyeuristic.

The feminist art movement was aimed at giving women the opportunity to have their art reach the same level of notoriety and respect that men's art received. The idea that women are intellectually inferior to men came from Aristotelian ideology and was heavily depended on during the Renaissance. It was believed by Aristotle that during the process of procreation, men were the driving force. They held all creative power while women were the receivers. Women's only role in reproduction was to provide the material and act as a vessel. This idea carried over into the image of the artist and the nude in art. The artist was seen specifically as a white male, and he was the only one who held the innate talent and creativity to be a successful professional artist. This belief system was prevalent in nude art. Women were depicted as passive, and they did not possess any control over their image. The female nude during the Renaissance was an image created by the male gaze.

In Jill Fields' article "Frontiers in Feminist Art History", Fields examines the feminist art movement and its assessment of female nude imagery. She considers how the image of the female nude was created and how the feminist art history movement attempted to change the way the image of the female nude was represented. Derived from the Renaissance ideal of feminine beauty, the image of the female body was created by men and for a male audience. In paintings like Gustave Courbet's The Origin of the World and François Boucher's Reclining Girl, women are depicted with open legs, implying that they are to be passive and an object to be used. In A. W. Eaton's essay "What's Wrong with the (Female) Nude? A Feminist Perspective on Art and Pornography", she discusses multiple ways in which the art of the female nude objectifies women. She considers how male nudes are both less common and represented as active and heroic, whereas female nudes are significantly more prevalent and represent women as passive, vulnerable, sexual objects. Eaton argues that the depiction of the female nude eroticizes the traditional gender hierarchy and contributes to systemic sex/gender inequality socially and psychologically. The feminist art history movement has aimed to change the way this image is perceived. The female nude has become less of an icon in Western art since the 1990s, but this decline in importance did not stop members of the feminist art movement from incorporating things like the "central core" image. This way of representing the nude female figure in art was focused on the fact that women were in control of their own image. The central image was focused on vulva-related symbols. By incorporating new images and symbols into the female nude image in Western art, the feminist art history movement continues to try and dismantle the male-dominated art world.

More recent discussion of the appropriateness of certain artworks has emerged in the context of the Me Too movement.

==== Nudes depicting the female and queer gaze ====
Female nudes have long been informed by the male gaze, and men's desires of the nudity of women. Feminist criticism has targeted female nudes, informed by the male gaze, for nearly a century. However, there are some artists who have turned this concept on its head, and have, as a result, distilled the criticisms embodied within the male gaze nude depictions of women. Artists have instilled the female gaze in the nudes they create. Rather than women being the object of men's desires, some artists have challenged traditional narratives of women, depicting them contrastingly as being non-sexualised.

Additionally, artists have implemented the queer gaze into art, and specifically nude art, which also challenges the traditional male gaze nude artwork.

- Helen Beard creates colourful and bright artwork in different mediums, from paintings, to needlepoint, to sculptures, depicting close ups of women in explicit, pornographic sexual positions. Her pieces embody women feeling pleasured by their bodies, which contradicts the traditional male gaze nudes of women previously.
- Lucy Liu has created a collection, entitled 'SHUNGA,' a Japanese term meaning erotic art. Liu's subject matter involves close up images of lesbian women, entwined within each other and bed sheets.
- Maggi Hambling recently commemorated the British feminist writer, Mary Wollstonecraft, by creating A Sculpture for Mary Wollstonecraft, which uses a nude female figure to represent the spirit of Wollstonecraft's feminism. This has caused great deals of controversy, with people questioning why Hambling chose to depict Wollstonecraft in nude form. However, Hambling has argued that her reasoning is to depict Wollstonecraft as a spirit and a representation of every woman.
- Louis Fratino has redefined the male gaze and how queer men and women are represented in nude art. His pieces explore queer sexuality in both everyday and erotic formats.
- Lisa Yuskavage's artwork has been included in The Female Gaze: Women Look at Women exhibition in 2009. Her work includes nude depictions of women, which illustrates the women as being incapable of caring what others think of them because of their own bodily discomfort, which does not make them subjected to the male gaze.
- Suzanne Valadon painted non-sexualised, not overly-erotic nude depictions of women. The art work does not depict women from the traditional male gaze standpoint, and Valadon was one of the only women artists to paint such subject matter, in such a way, in the first half of the 20th century.

==== Intersectionality ====
The nude image in art has affected women of color in a different way than it has white women, according to Charmaine Nelson. The different depictions of the nude in art has not only instituted a system of controlling the image of women but it has put women of color in a place of other. The intersection of their identities, as Nelson asserts, creates a "doubly fetishized black female body". Women of color are not represented to the degree that white women are in nude art from the Renaissance to the 1990s, and when they are represented it is in a different way than white women. The Renaissance ideal of female beauty did not include black women. White women were represented as a sexual image, and they were the ideal sexual image for men during the Renaissance. White women, in most major works before the 20th century, did not have pubic hair. Black women normally did, and this created their image in an animalistic sexual way. While the white women's image became one of innocence and the idealized, black women were continually overtly sexualized, she adds.

=== Social commentary ===
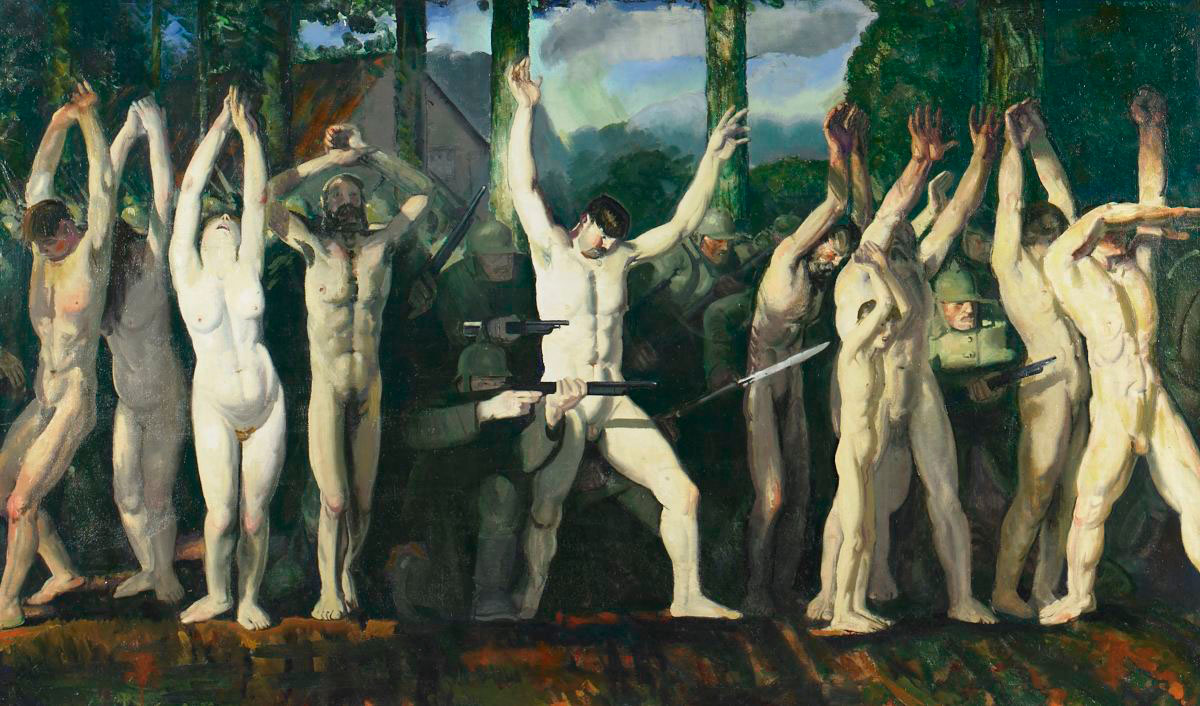
The Barricade (1918), oil on canvas, by George Bellows. A painting inspired by an incident in August 1914 in which German soldiers used Belgian townspeople as human shields.

The nude has also been used to make a powerful social or political statement. An example is The Barricade (1918) by George Bellows, which depicts Belgian citizens being used as human shields by Germans in World War I. Although based upon a report of a real incident in which the victims were not nude, portraying them so in the painting emphasizes their vulnerability and universal humanity.

=== Social networks and content moderation ===
The pervasive use of automated content moderation algorithms on social media platforms has made it difficult for many artists to share their works. The Leopold Museum's social media manager Pia Semond said "Our images are repeatedly reported for sexually explicit content [...] In major cases, our account is restricted: its content is not shown to unfamiliar users, and the account cannot be found by typing our name in the search bar."

== Media ==
=== Drawing, painting and sculpture ===
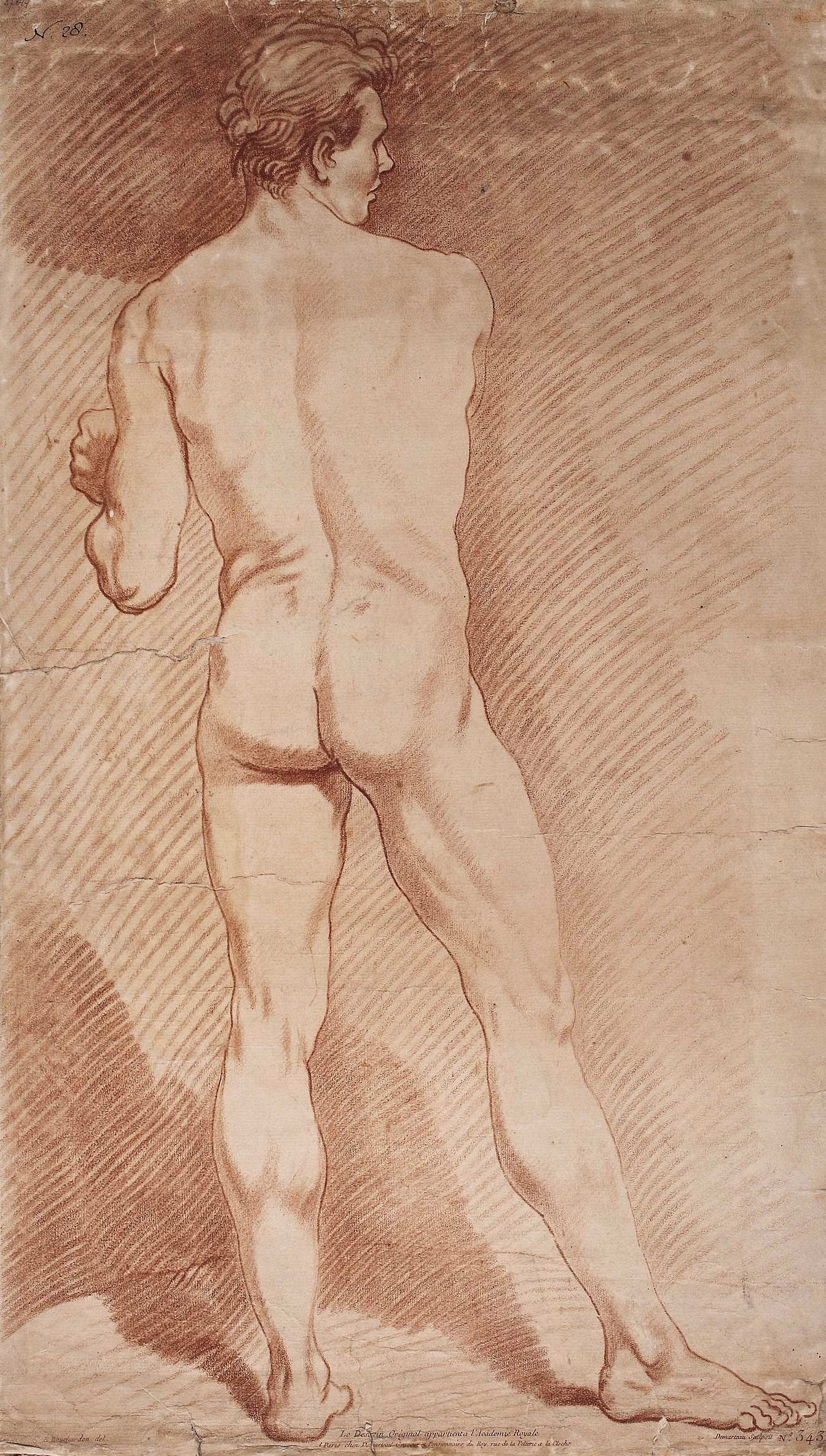
Crayon-style print by Gilles Demarteau with a nude man after original drawing by Edmé Bouchardon was acquired by Academy of Fine Arts in Warsaw as a teaching material

A figure drawing is a study of the human form in its various shapes and body postures, with line, form, and composition as the primary objective, rather than the subject person. A life drawing is a work that has been drawn from an observation of a live model. Study of the human figure has traditionally been considered the best way to learning how to draw, beginning in the late Renaissance and continuing to the present.

Oil paint historically has been the ideal medium for depicting the nude. By blending and layering paint, the surface can become more like skin. "Its slow drying time and various degrees of viscosity enable the artist to achieve rich and subtle blends of color and texture, which can suggest transformations from one human substance to another."

Due to its durability, it is in sculpture that we see the full, nearly unbroken history of the nude from the Stone Age to the present. Figures, usually of the naked female, have been found in the Balkan region dating back to 7,000 BCE and continue to this day to be generated. In the Indian and Southeast Asian sculpture tradition nudes were frequently adorned with bracelets and jewelry that tended to "punctuate their charms and demarcate the different parts of their bodies much as developed musculature does in the male".

=== Photography ===
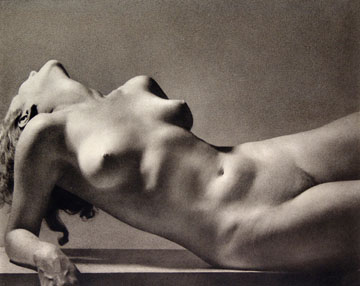
Nude study (c. 1935) by William Mortensen

The nude has been a subject of photography almost since its invention in the nineteenth century. Early photographers often selected poses that imitated the classical nudes of the past. Photography suffers from the problem of being too real, and for many years was not accepted by those committed to the traditional fine arts. However, many photographers have been established as fine artists including Ruth Bernhard, Anne Brigman, Imogen Cunningham, Alfred Stieglitz and Edward Weston.

=== New media ===
In the late twentieth century several new art forms emerged, including installation, performance and video art, all of which have been used to create works that explore the concept of the nude. An example is Mona Kuhn's site-specific installation Experimental (2018), which employs video projections, vinyl installation, and other mixed media.

== See also ==
- Academic art – Style of painting and sculpture
- Artistic freedom – Freedom of expression and publication
- Body proportions – Proportions of the human body in art
  - Artistic canons of body proportions – Criteria used in formal figurative art
- Depictions of nudity – Visual representations of the nude human form
- Figurative art – Art that depicts real object sources
  - Figure drawing – Drawing of the usually unclothed human form
  - Figure painting – Genre of painting that represents the human form
- The Helga Pictures – Series of paintings and drawings by Andrew Wyeth
- History of nudity – Social attitudes towards nudity
- History of erotic depictions
- History of nude art – Throughout history
- Model (art) – Person who poses for a visual artist
- Nude photography (art) – Artistic photography of the naked human body
- Vagina and vulva in art – Visual art representing female genitalia
