= Kegel Gate =

Coordinates: 50.981972°N 11.333844°E

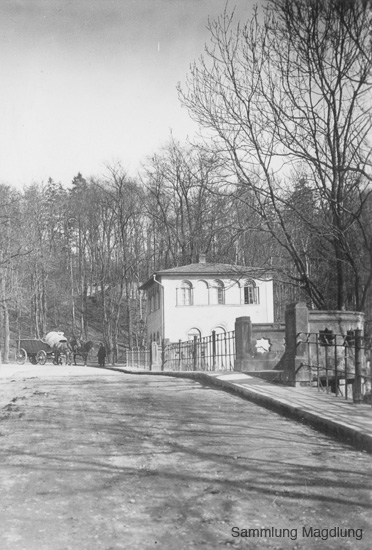
The Newer Kegel Gate to the right of the Ilm (view from the Kegel Bridge, looking east), c.1910.

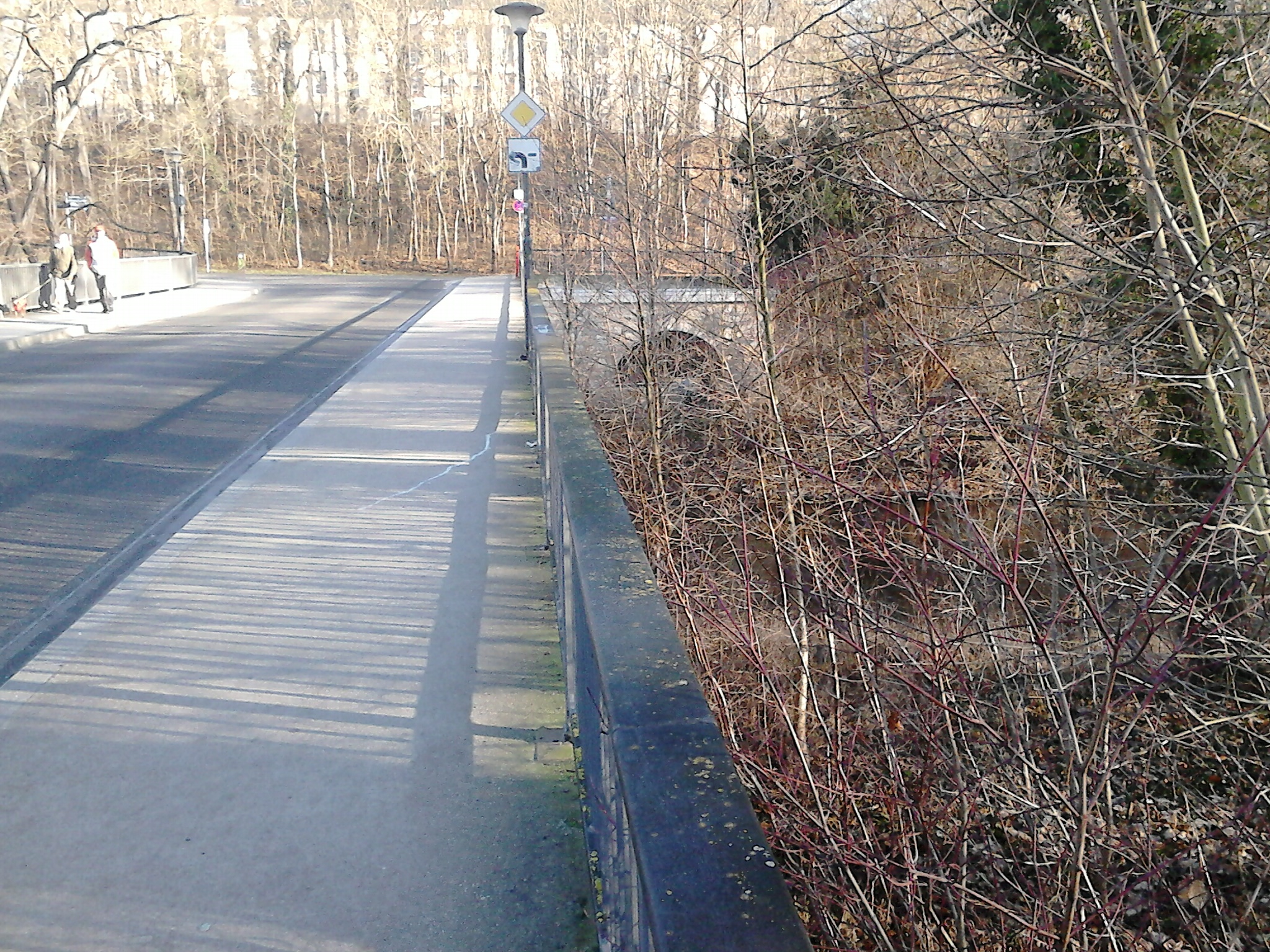
The Kegel Bridge looking towards the site of the Kegel Gate, January 2020.

The Kegel Gate (Kegeltor) was the north-easternmost gate on the city walls of Weimar in Germany. From the late Middle Ages onwards it consisted of an inner and outer gate, both located on the left bank of the River Ilm north of Burg Hornstein (now the Weimar City Castle). It was demolished in the second half of the 18th century during the dismantling of the city's fortifications.

Although there was no longer any military need for the gate, tolls and paving fees continued to be collected and so in 1803 the medieval building was replaced by an unfortified gatehouse on the right hand of the Ilm towards the Kegel Bridge, probably designed by Heinrich Gentz. This was demolished in 1964 after an accident involving a truck, but the building's foundations still survive.

The bridge itself also changed over time, with the removal of the semi-circular icebreaker and the bridge piers' stone parapets (essentially functioning as exedra). and the addition of a new railing.

== Bibliography (in German) ==
- Fritz Fink: Die Stadtbefestigung : Mauern, Tore und Türme im alten Weimar, Verlag Fink, Weimar [1932].
- Hannelore Henze, Ilse-Sibylle Stapff: Streifzüge durch das alte Weimar. Weimar 2004, S. 85–88.
