= Adolph Doebber =

German architect, builder and historian

Adolph Doebber (20 August 1848 – 22 April 1920) was a German architect, master builder and architectural historian, with a particular focus on neoclassical architecture in Berlin and how it related to its equivalent in Weimar and to Goethe—for example, he published on the architect Heinrich Gentz, who built the Goethe-Theater in Lauchstädt and worked on the Schloss in Weimar.

== Life ==
Born in Magdeburg, he graduated from the Royal Wilhelm Gymnasium in Berlin in 1868 and then attended the Bauakademie in the same city. He passed the master builder's qualification in 1876 before becoming involved in the construction of the Preußische Hauptkadettenanstalt. After that he was employed by the Prussian Army's administration in Spandau.

In 1892 he became intendant advisor and building advisor to III Corps's intendant's office. In 1898 he retired to focus wholly on architectural history, settling in Weimar in 1918, where he died two years later.

== Works ==
=== Zentralblatt der Bauverwaltung ===
- Die Entwürfe zum Denkmal für Friedrich den Großen in Berlin. Nr. 53, 1912, p. 334–337, 341–342
- Schinkel und Goethe. Ein Gedenkblatt zum 13. März. In: Nr. 22, 1919, p. 113–115
- Joseph Furttenbach der Ältere als Theater- und Schulhausbaumeister. Nr. 10, 1917, p. 57–60

=== Thieme-Becker, Volume 14 ===
- Gilly, David., p. 48
- Gilly, Friedrich., p. 48–49
- Gontard, Karl Philipp Christian von., p. 372–373

=== Other ===
- Lauchstädt und Weimar. Eine theaterbaugeschichtliche Studie. Mittler, Berlin 1908.
- Die Berliner „Alte Münze“ und ihr Erbauer. In: Mitteilungen des Vereins für die Geschichte Berlins. Nr. 2, 1909, p. 27–36.
- Das Schloß in Weimar. Seine Geschichte vom Brande 1774 bis zur Wiederherstellung 1804 (= Zeitschrift des Vereins für Thüringische Geschichte und Altertumskunde Neue Folge Supplementheft 3). G. Fischer, Jena 1911 (Online).
- Kunst- und Baudenkmäler im Tessin. In: Wochenschrift des Architekten-Vereins zu Berlin. 2, 1907, Nr. 11–14.
- Das Innere des alten Weimarer Theaters. In: Goethe-Jahrbuch. 33, 1912, p. 152–157 (Online).
- Studienreisen in Sizilien und Besteigung des Ätna im Jahre 1792. Sonderdruck aus dem Manuskript. Sittenfeld, Berlin [um 1914].
- Heinrich Gentz, ein Berliner Baumeister um 1800. Heymann, Berlin 1916.
- Goethe und sein Gut in Ober-Roßla. Nach den Akten im Goethe- und Schiller-Archiv u. im Geh. Haupt- und Staats-Archiv zu Weimar. In: Jahrbuch der Goethe-Gesellschaft. 6, 1919, p. 195–239 (Online).
- Schinkel in Weimar. In: Jahrbuch der Goethe-Gesellschaft. 10, 1924, p. 103–130 (Online).

== Bibliography (in German) ==
- H.: Intendantur- und Baurat a. D. Adolf Doebber †. In: Deutsche Bauzeitung, 54, 1920, Nr. 41, p. 234 (Online).
- Julius Kohte: Adolf Doebber †. In: Zentralblatt der Bauverwaltung. Nr. 38, 1920, p. 247–248
