= Johann August Arens =

German architect

Johann August Arens (born 10 February 1757 in Hamburg; died 18 August 1806 in Pisa, Italy) was a German architect of classicism, a landscape designer, a painter, and a member of the Royal Prussian Academy of Fine Arts and Mechanical Sciences in Berlin.

== Buildings ==
- 1789–1792: Reconstruction of the Weimar City Palace
- 1792–1797: Roman House in the Park an der Ilm in Weimar
- 1794–1797: Country house of Baron Caspar Voght in Klein Flottbek, Hamburg
- 1800: Cemetery chapel St. Petri in Hamburg
- Country house Duncker in Hamburg-Horn
- 1801: Gentz staircase in the Weimar city palace, completed by Heinrich Gentz between 1802 and 1803
- Country house Amsinck
- Country house Mönckeberg
- Country house Eiffe
- Wandsbeker Church (inaugurated in 1800)
