= Young Men by the Sea =

Painting by Max Beckmann

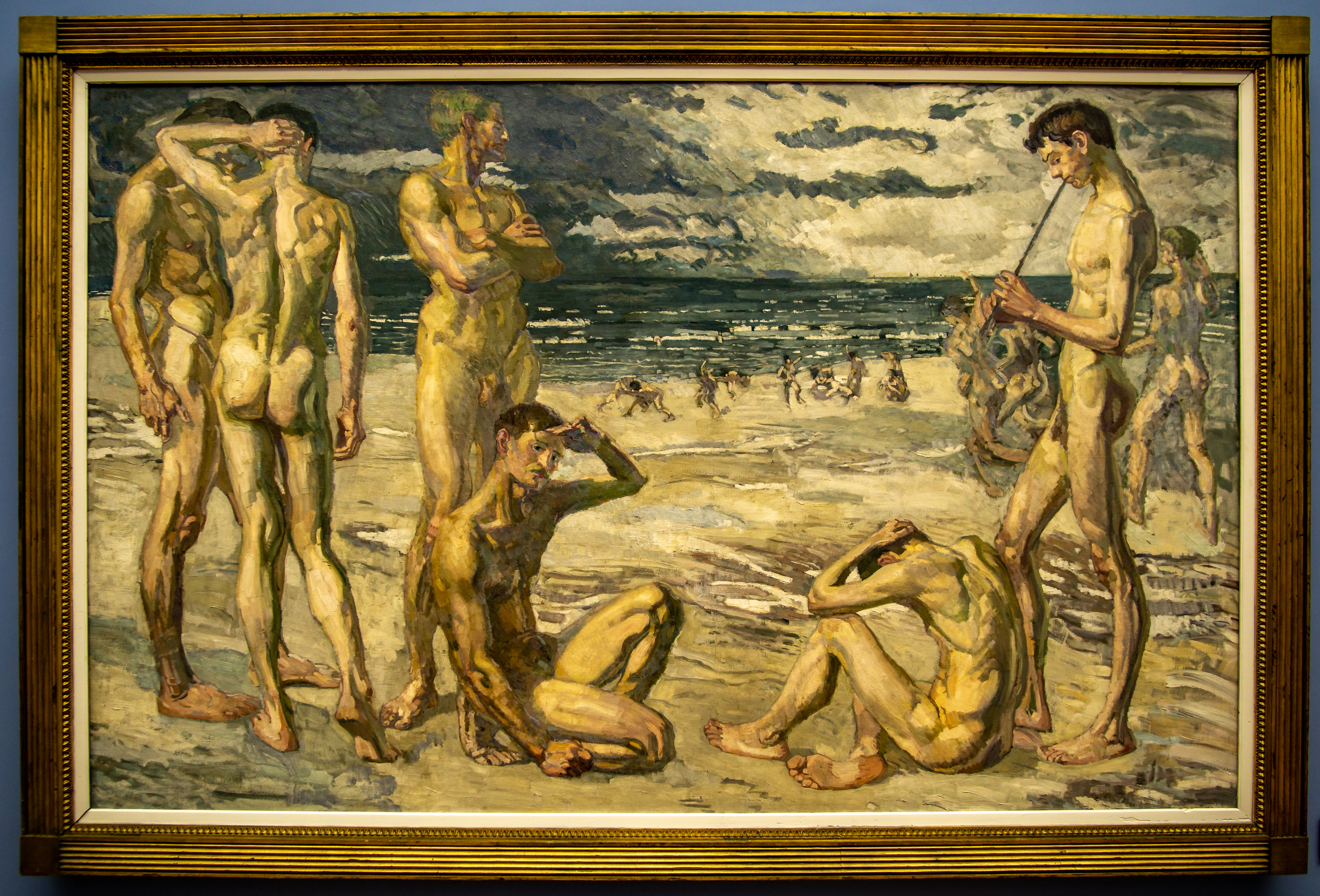
- Artist: Max Beckmann
- Year: 1905
- Medium: Oil on canvas
- Dimensions: 148 cm × 235 cm (58 in × 93 in)
- Location: Schloss Weimar; Weimar

Young Men by the Sea is an oil on canvas painting by Max Beckmann, executed in 1905. It his held at the Schloss Weimar, Klassik Stiftung, in Weimar.

== Description ==
The painting, executed when the painter was 21 years old, reflects his academic training, and at the same time, the influence of contemporary Post-Impressionist painters, like Paul Cézanne and Vincent van Gogh. Beckmann had visited France the previous year and had the chance of knowing personally the work of several contemporary French painters.

The large painting depicts several nude young men, near the sea, of which six appear in the foreground. Four of them are up and two seated in the ground. The boy to the right seems to be playing a musical instrument. Other youngsters at the background seem to be engaging in playful activity and swimming. The work seems to reflect an ideal of male classical beauty, with the boys in the foreground appearing in several poses, giving it the resemblance of an anatomic study, and at the same time illustrates his interest by the sea. The academic training of the young painter is connected to his still recent knowledge of more contemporary artistic tendencies, that would influence him greatly in the future.

== Reception ==
The painting was highly appreciated at his time. Beckmann was awarded the Villa Prize and the painting was acquired by the Schloss Weimar, in Weimar, where it still hangs. Karl Scheffler stated back then that Young Men at the Sea, demonstrated "an extraordinary sensitive for the musical human dynamism in older pictures." In 1908, Beckmann admitted that the painting wasn't sufficiently original, because it lacked his own personal stamp.
