= Prinzessinnenpalais =

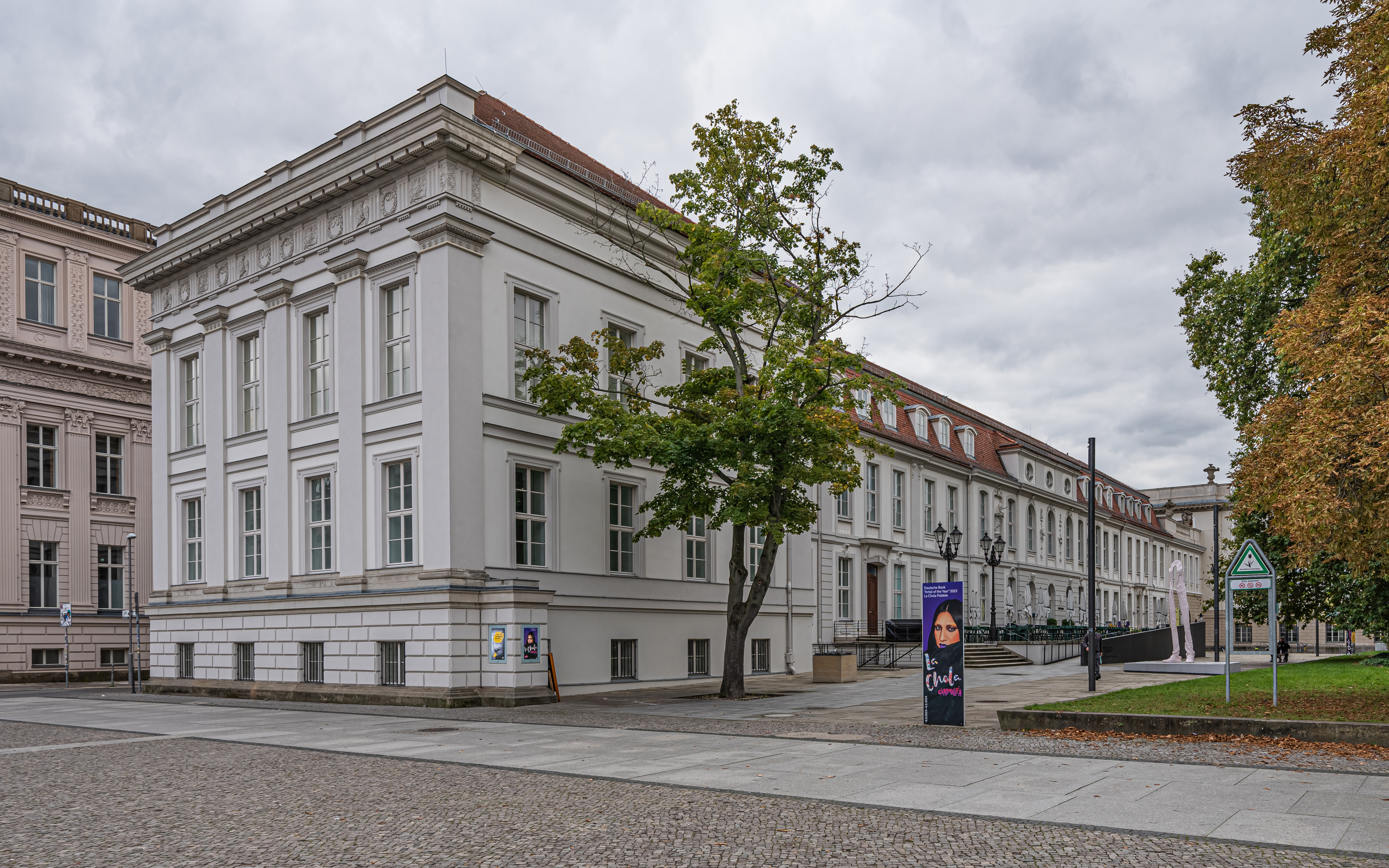
- Prinzessinnenpalais
- Interactive map of the Prinzessinnenpalais area

General information
- Type: Palace
- Architectural style: Neoclassical
- Location: Berlin, Germany
- Coordinates: 52.5169°N 13.3962°E
- Construction started: 1733 (original); 1811 (extension)
- Renovated: 1963-1964 (reconstruction)

Design and construction
- Architects: Friedrich Wilhelm Diterichs (original); Heinrich Gentz (extension); Richard Paulick (reconstruction)

The Prinzessinnenpalais (English: Princesses' Palace) is a former Royal Prussian residence on Unter den Linden boulevard in the historic centre of Berlin. It was built in 1733 according to plans by Friedrich Wilhelm Diterichs in Rococo style and extended from 1810 to 1811 by Heinrich Gentz in Neoclassical style. Damaged during the Allied bombing in World War II, the Prinzessinnenpalais was rebuilt from 1963 to 1964 by Richard Paulick as part of the Forum Fridericianum. Since 2018, it has been home to the PalaisPopulaire, an art collection of Deutsche Bank.

== See also ==
- Kronprinzenpalais

== Bibliography ==
- Folkwin Wendland. "Berlins Gärten und Parke von der Gründung der Stadt bis zum ausgehenden neunzehnten Jahrhundert: Das klassische Berlin". Propyläen Verlag (1979). pp. 55–57 (in German)
