= Giovanni Bonalino =

Giovanni Bonalino (c. 1575 – 1633, in Bamberg) was an Italian builder and mason, who worked primarily in Germany. He worked on several churches in Bamberg, the Schloss Ehrenburg in Coburg, the Pfarrhaus in Frensdorf, and the Schloss in Weimar. He began designing the palace in Weimar in 1619 following a fire in 1774.
