= Goethe-Theater (Bad Lauchstädt) =

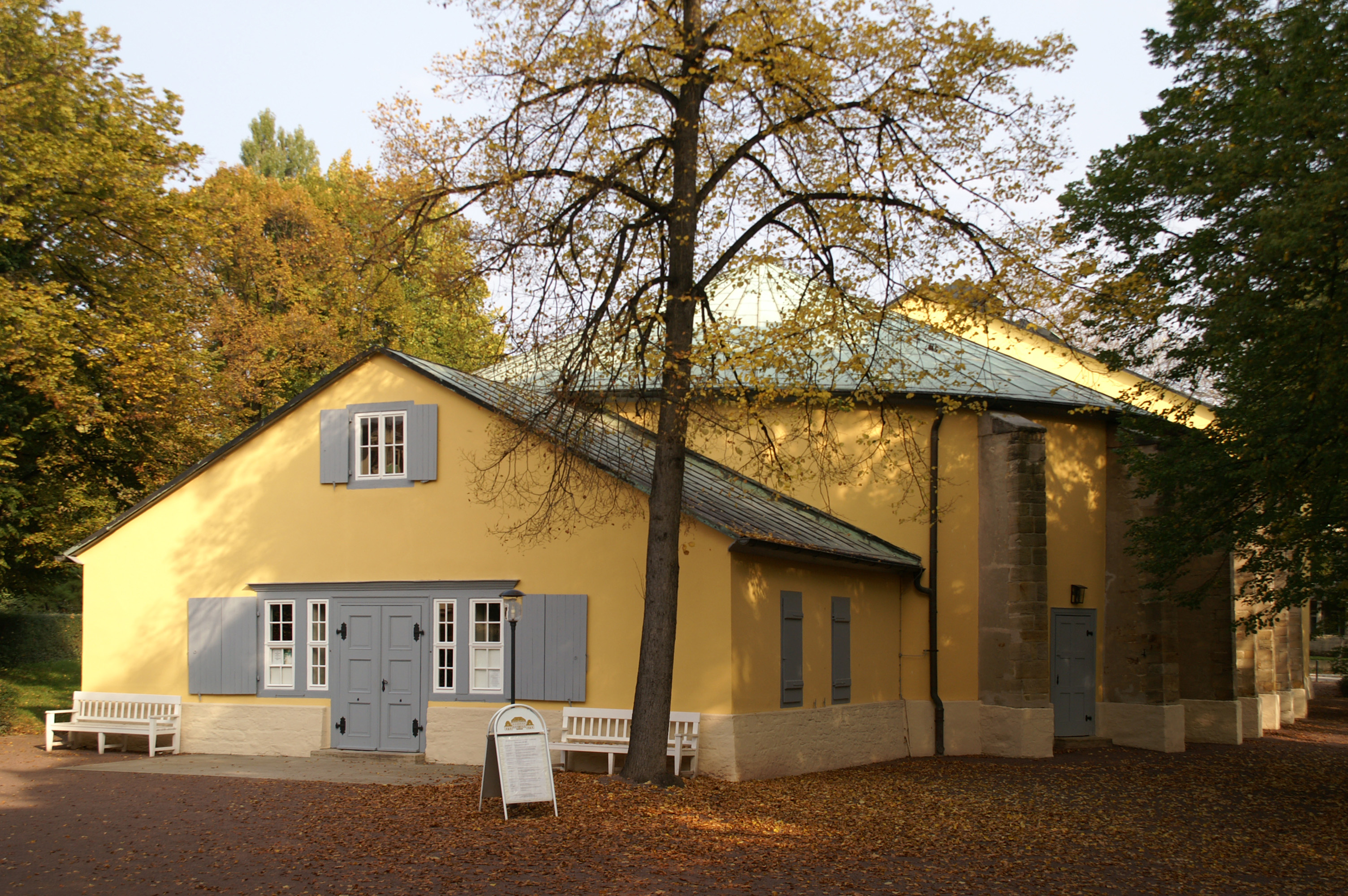
Exterior

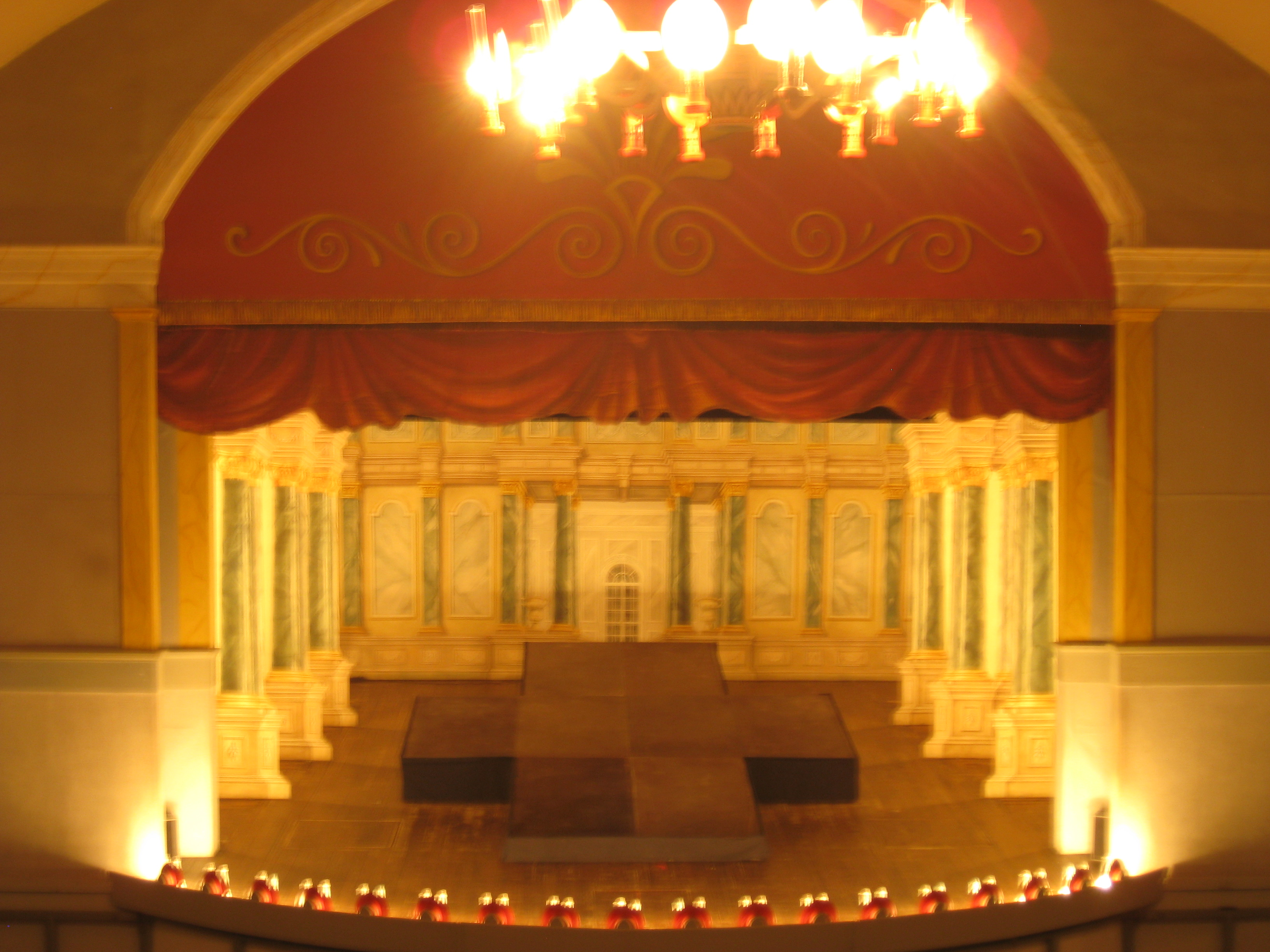
Interior

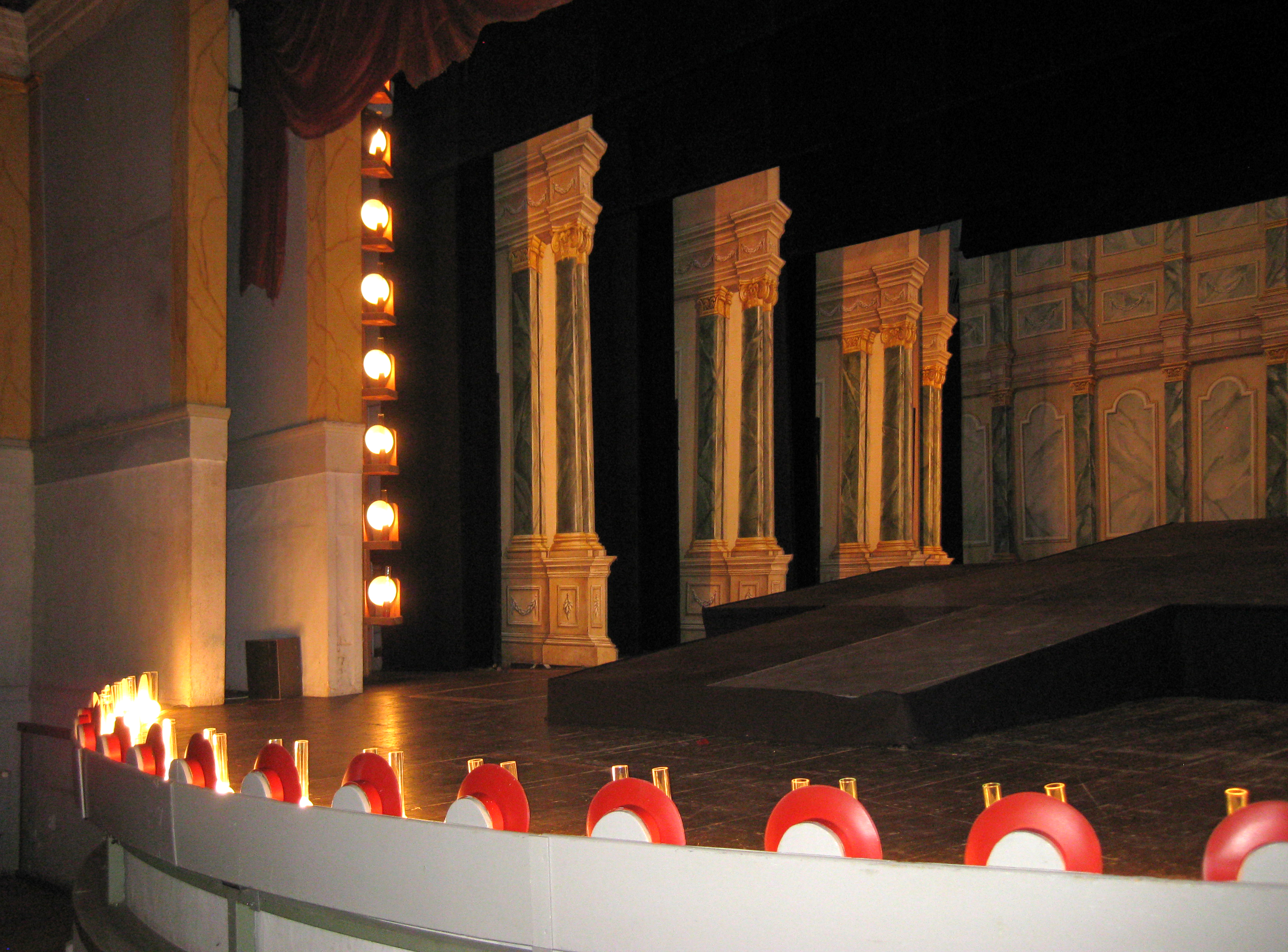
Stage

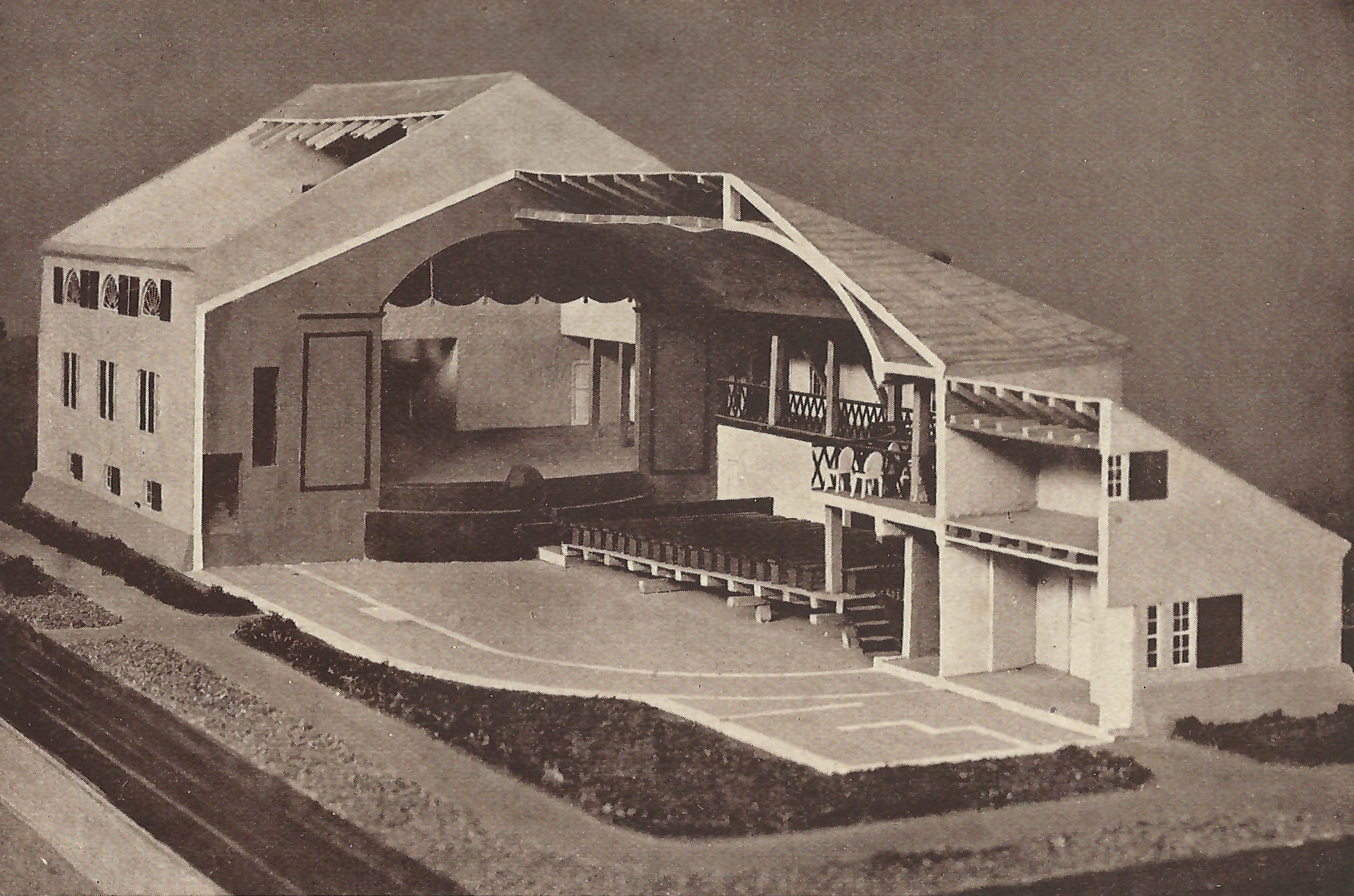
Model of the theatre at the 1927 German Theatre Exhibition

The Goethe-Theater Bad Lauchstädt is a theatre building in Bad Lauchstädt and the only surviving theatre building from the era of Goethe.

== History ==
=== Inception ===
There was a theatre building in the town from 1776 onwards. Goethe became director general of the court theatre in Weimar and bought Joseph Bellomo's court theatre for 1200 taler. On 13 June 1791 onwards Weimar's court theatre regularly played a summer season in Lauchstädt. As the existing building's facilities were inadequate Goethe decided to build a new structure for it.

Bad Lauchstädt was in the Electorate of Saxony rather than Weimar itself and so the new building faced many bureaucratic hurdles. There were also several artistic disagreements. Weimar's court architect Johann Friedrich Rudolf Steiner and the Berlin-base darchitect Heinrich Gentz contributed to the design, as did Goethe himself, via precise instructions for the interior decoration according to his colour theory, for the stage design, for the stage machinery and even giving 9,000 taler to the building costs (covering about one sixth of the total).

Its design is simple, with the function of its constituent parts clearly discernible from the outside, though sandstone buttresses added in the mid-19th century significantly obscure the building's character. The auditorium is also simple but exquisitely proportioned, offering excellent sightlines and acoustics and spanned by a canvas ceiling, which has been interpreted as an "ancient sunshade" as in ancient Roman amphitheatres and theatres. The seating in the stalls is simple, while the boxes are equipped with upholstered chairs. Oil lamps still provide the lighting, though the building has also been electrified since 1908.

=== 20th century to present ===
For 1932's centenary of Goethe's death the spa facilities, the theatre itself and their furnishings were all renovated by Swiss architect Hans Wittwer, with input from the Burg Giebichenstein University of Art and Design. The client was the Merseburg Provincial Administration; the project was supervised by State Building Councilor Petry, Merseburg Building Authority. The theatre's stage backdrop was designed by Charles Crodel, and the lighting by Karl Müller.

On 30-31 May 1933, immediately after the Nazi seizure of power, the provisional provincial governor Kurt Otto gave the order to destroy Crodel's wall paintings on the proscenium arch of the main auditorium and the Kleine Kursaal.

== Garden dreams ==
Historic Spa Facilities and Goethe Theatre are part of the Saxony-Anhalt Garden Dreams project.

== Bibliography ==
- (in German) Adolph Doebber: Lauchstädt und Weimar. Eine theaterbaugeschichtliche Studie. Mittler, Berlin 1908.
- (in German) Norbert Eisold, Edeltraut Lausch (1991), Du-Mont Kunst-Reiseführer, vol. Sachsen–Anhalt, Köln: Du-Mont Buchverlag, p. 386, ISBN 3-7701-2590-8
