= Heinrich Gentz =

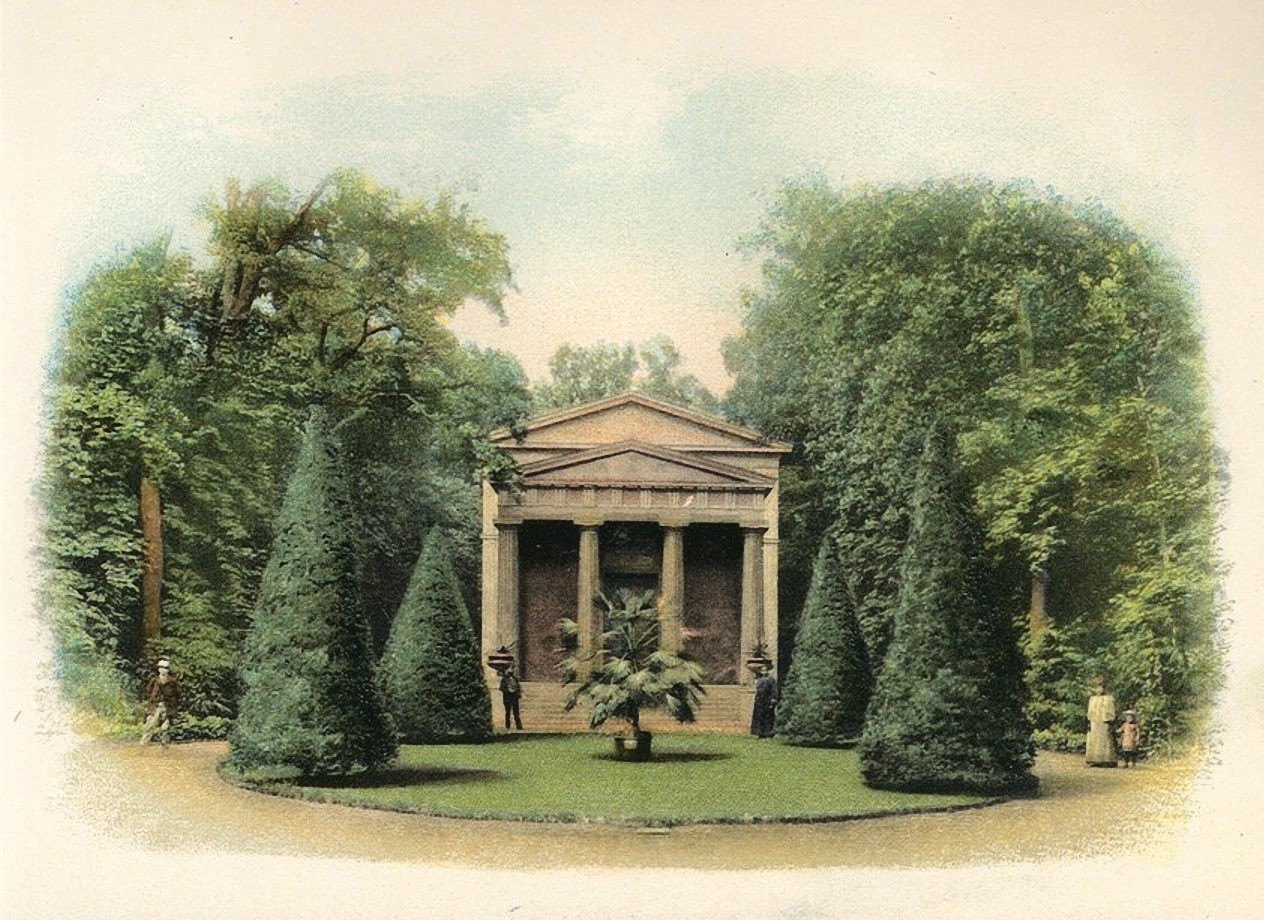
The mauseoleum designed in 1810–1811 by Gentz for Queen Luise in the Schlosspark Charlottenburg

Heinrich Gentz (5 February 1766 – 3 October 1811) was a German Neoclassical architect.

== Family ==
He was the second son of Johann Friedrich Gentz(e), master of a mint in the city who became general mint director in Berlin in 1779 and was friends with Gotthold Ephraim Lessing, Immanuel Kant, Moses Mendelssohn and Christian Garve. On his mother's side Heinrich was a cousin of Jean Pierre Frédéric Ancillon, a government minister and tutor to the Prussian princes. Among his brothers, Friedrich became a publicist and historian based in Vienna as well as the closest member of Prince Metternich's staff, whilst Ludwig became secretary to the Prussian privy council, Minister for War in the Prussian Finance Ministry and a friend of Friedrich Gilly (marrying Gully's wife's sister).

== Life ==
He was born in Breslau (now Wrocław in Poland but then part of the Kingdom of Prussia) and trained as an architect from 1783 to 1790 at the Berliner Kunstakademie under Carl von Gontard. He took a grand tour to Italy between 1790 and 1795, including three and a half years in Rome and a long period studying Magna Grecia ruins in Sicily, meeting Aloys Hirt in Italy and writing a detailed report of these travels. He then worked at the royal building office in Berlin and from 1796 onwards also at the Kunstakademie.

In 1799 he was one of the founder members of the Berliner Bauakademie, where he taught urban planning, and married Henriette Louise Philippine Holtzecker (1778–1814), daughter of Georg Holtzecker (a Berlin merchant) and Louise Friederike Sieberdt - they had no children. He was released from his posts in Berlin thanks to Johann Wolfgang von Goethe in 1801 and moved to Weimar, where he worked for Karl August on the Residenzschloss and other ducal buildings in Weimar and Bad Lauchstädt. While in Weimar Gentz became close friends with Goethe and got to know Friedrich von Schiller and Christoph Martin Wieland.

In 1803 he not only returned to Berlin but was made a member of the Kunstakademie's senate (becoming a full member in 1805 and acting as the Kunstakademie's secretary from 1809 onwards). As chief architect to the royal court, in 1810 he became the first director of the Berlin Palace building commission. Also in 1810 he joined with Hirt and Wilhelm von Humboldt to convert the Prinz-Heinrich-Palais into a university and joined the Gesetzlosen Gesellschaft zu Berlin, dying in the city the following year.

== Architectural work ==
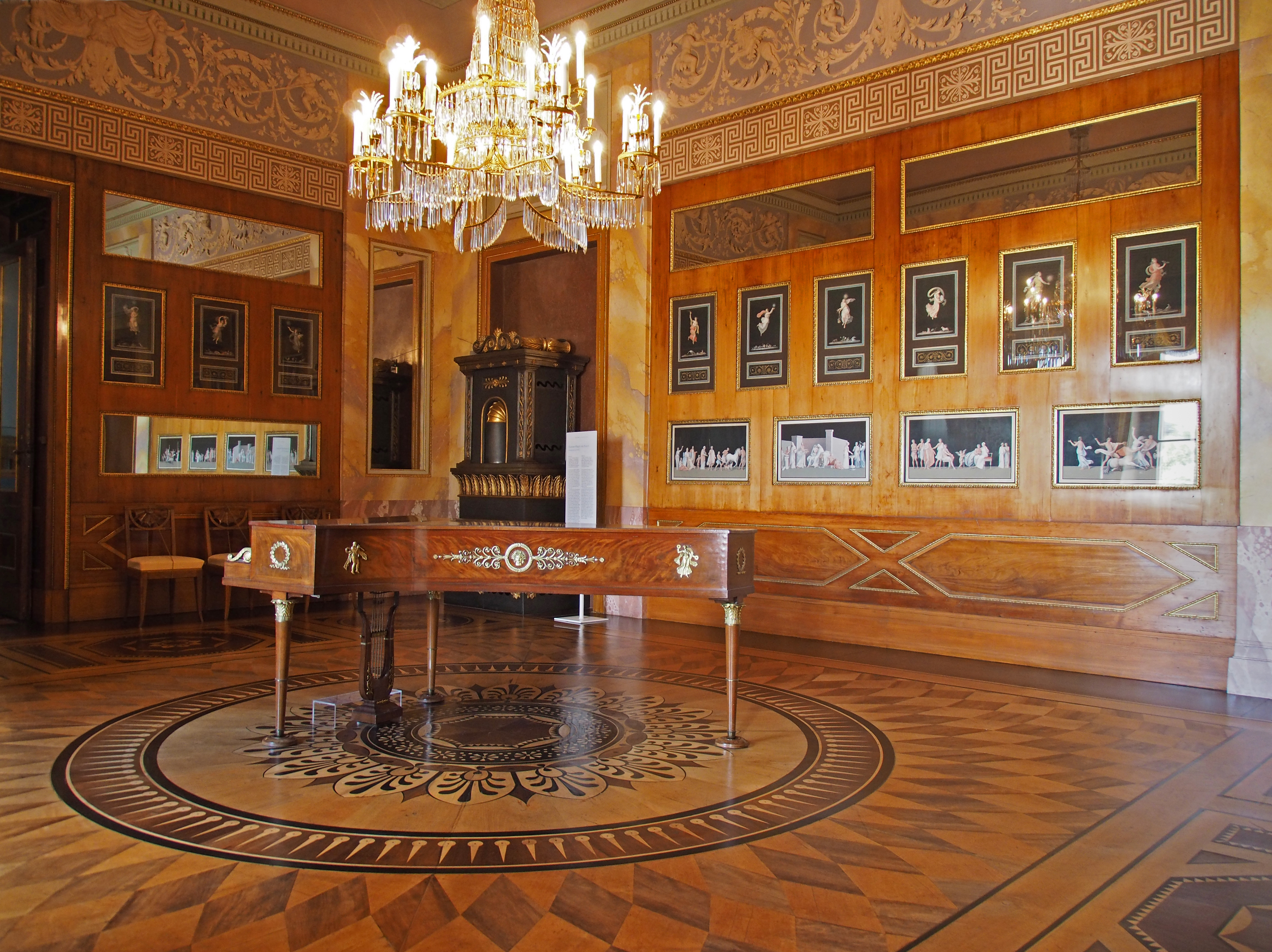
"Zedernzimmer", Maria Pawlowna's drawing room in the Weimarer Stadtschloss

- 1798–1800: Royal Mint on the Friedrichwerderschen Markt in Berlin, demolished in 1886.
- 1800: Friedrich Gilly's tomb monument
- 1801–1803: Outbuildings at the Weimarer Stadtschloss
- 1802: Goethe-Theater in Bad Lauchstädt
- 1803: Kegeltor in Weimar
- 1803–1804: Reithaus and Schießhaus in Weimar
- 1804–1808: Gutshaus Beyme (aka the Gutshaus Steglitz or Wrangelschlösschen) in Berlin-Steglitz, in collaboration with David Gilly
- 1809–1811: Main Building of the Prinzessinnenpalais in Berlin
- 1810–1811: Mausoleum for Queen Luise in the Schlosspark Charlottenburg (extended by Karl Friedrich Schinkel).

=== Unbuilt designs ===
- 1806: the Neue Wache in Berlin as part of the project to improve the area between Unter den Linden and the royal palace
- 1810: the Assembly Hall at the University of Berlin in the Prinz-Heinrich-Palais

== Works ==
- Briefe über Sizilien. In: Neue deutsche Monatsschrift 1795, S. 314–345.
- Beschreibung der für das Huldigungsfest bestimmten und ausgeführten Verzierungen. In: Jahrbuch der preußischen Monarchie 2, 1798, p. 467–476.
- Beschreibung des neuen Königlichen Münzgebäudes. In: Sammlung nützlicher Aufsätze und Nachrichten die Baukunst betreffend 4, 1800, 1, p. 14–26 (Digitalisat).
- Michael Bollé, Karl-Robert Schütze (ed.s): Heinrich Gentz. Reise nach Rom und Sizilien 1790–1795. Aufzeichnungen und Skizzen eines Berliner Architekten. Berlin 2004, ISBN 3-922912-57-5.

== Bibliography (in German) ==
- Adolph Doebber: Heinrich Gentz, ein Berliner Baumeister um 1800. Heymann, Berlin 1916.
- Michael Bollé: Heinrich Gentz (1766–1811). Eine Untersuchung zur Architekturdiskussion in Berlin um 1800. Dissertation Freie Universität Berlin 1988.
- Lothar Hyss: Der Wiederaufbau des Weimarer Residenzschlosses in den Jahren 1789–1803. Unter besonderer Berücksichtigung des Beitrages von Heinrich Gentz. Weimar 1996, ISBN 3-932124-12-X.
- Rolf Bothe: Dichter, Fürst und Architekten. Das Weimarer Residenzschloß vom Mittelalter bis zum Anfang des 19. Jahrhunderts. Ostfildern-Ruit 2000.
- Alste Horn-Oncken (1964). "Gentz, Johann Heinrich". Neue Deutsche Biographie (in German). Vol. 6. Berlin: Duncker & Humblot. pp. 193–194. (full text online).
- Cord-Friedrich Berghahn: Wiedergeburt der Architektur. Heinrich Gentz und Friedrich Gilly als europäische Klassizisten in Berlin. In: Berichte und Abhandlungen der Berlin-Brandenburgischen Akademie der Wissenschaften, Band 10, 2006, S. 273–305. (PDF)
- Michael Bollé: Vom Gefühl zur Kritik. Heinrich Gentz in Italien. In: Max Kunze (ed.): Italien in Preußen. Preußen in Italien (= Schriften der Winckelmann-Gesellschaft. Bd. 25). Stendal 2006, S. 102–108.
- Cord-Friedrich Berghahn: Das Wagnis der Autonomie. Studien zu Karl Philipp Moritz, Wilhelm von Humboldt, Heinrich Gentz, Friedrich Gilly und Ludwig Tieck (= Germanisch-Romanische Monatsschrift. Beiheft 47). Winter, Heidelberg 2012.
- Michael Bollé: Heinrich Gentz (1766-1811). In: Uwe Schaper (ed.): Baumeister – Ingenieure – Gartenarchitekten. Berlinische Lebensbilder II (Historische Kommission zu Berlin), Berlin 2016, S. 47–63.
