= Deutsche Bauzeitung =

Architecture periodical in Germany

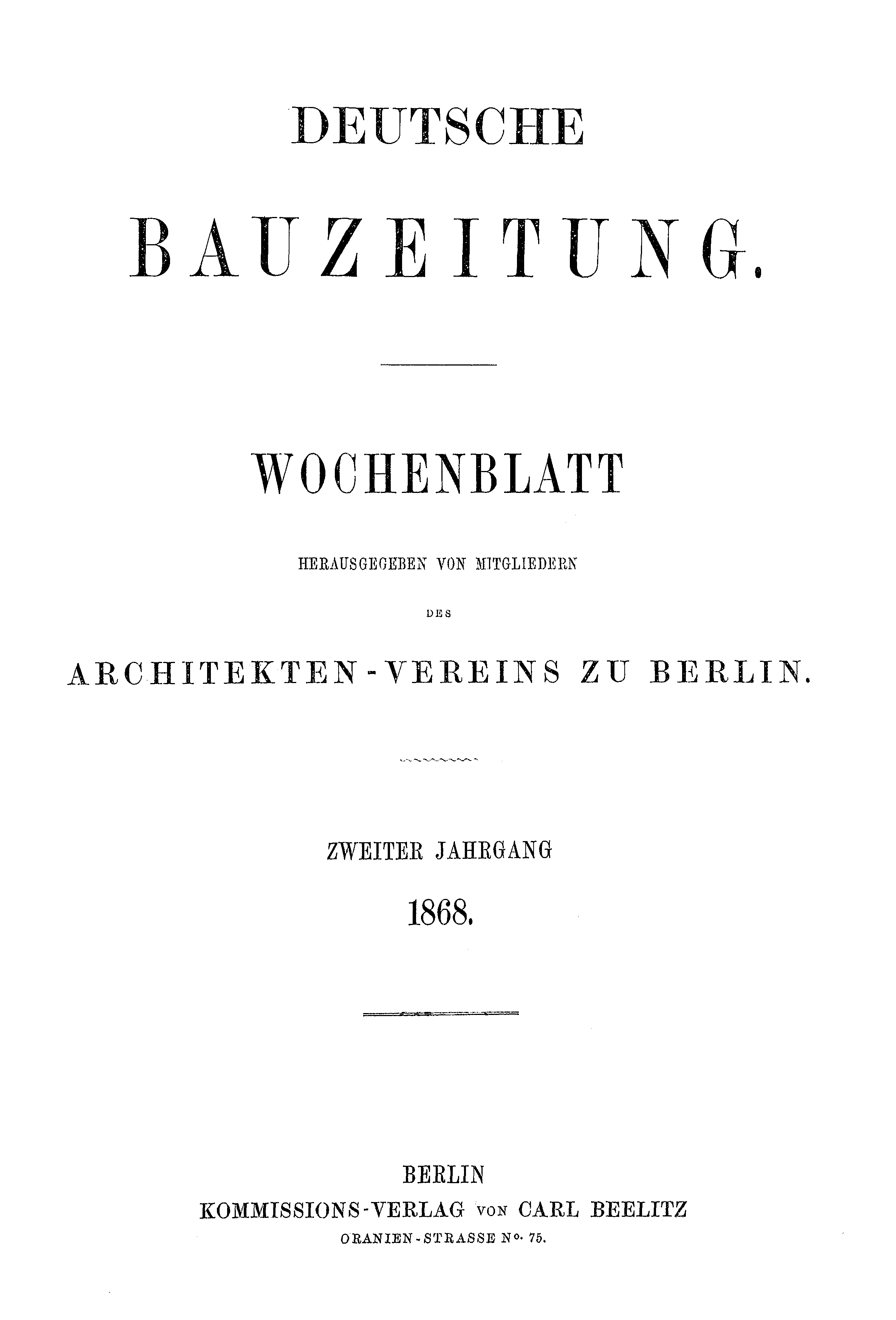

Deutsche Bauzeitung (stylized as db deutsche bauzeitung) is the oldest technical architecture publication periodical in Germany. The magazine was established in 1867. Its headquarters is in Leinfelden-Echterdingen. The publisher is Konrad Medien GmbH. The magazine targets both architects and civil engineers.
