= Lothar Hyss =

German historian (1960–2022)

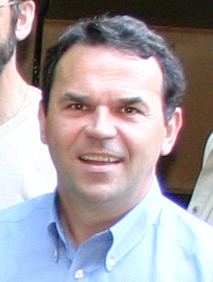
Lothar Hyss

Lothar Hyss (5 March 1960 – 19 March 2022) was a German historian.

== Life ==
Hyss was born in Rzędzów (known as Friedrichsfelde before 1945) and - since his father was a specialist needed to rebuild post-war Silesia - it was only later that the family moved to Germany, with Hyss learning Polish as a second native language. After taking a German abitur he studied art history in Bonn, West Germany and worked for ten years as a research assistant in the Haus Schlesien in Königswinter. He submitted his dissertation to the University of Bonn in 1996. He died in Everswinkel.

=== Works ===
- 1997: Johann Wolfgang von Goethe und das Residenzschloß zu Weimar: die Geschichte vom Wiederaufbau des Weimarer Residenzschlosses in den Jahren 1789–1803
- 2012: Ernst Kolbe: ein Impressionist aus Westpreußen
- several publications published by the West Prussian State Museum

== Museum director ==
From 1 April 1998 until retiring for health reasons in April 2021 Hyss was director of the West Prussian State Museum in Münster. During that tenure he collaborated with museums in former West Prussia such as Gdańsk's Historical Museum and National Museum, built a branch of the museum in Krockow, and moved the main museum into its new home in the former Franciscan Monastery in Warendorf. In 2016 the Historical Commission for East and West Prussian Regional Research (of which Hyss had been a full member since 2001), Hyss and the Copernicus Association invited participants to a conference at the Museum entitled “Culture of Remembrance and Museums using Prussia as an example".

=== Exhibitions ===
Hyss organised:

- “Quis ut Deus.” Art from the time of the Teutonic Order. Treasures from the Diocesan Museum in Pelplin.
- 19th-century Gdańsk painting. From the holdings of the National Museum in Gdańsk, Fragments of the Past.
- The Marienburg Castle Museum as a guest in Westphalia and Franconia (collaboration with the East Prussia Cultural Center Ellingen)
- The painter and lithographer Ernst Kolbe (1876 Marienwerder – 1945 Rathenow), 2009 and 2014
- Amber – the Gold of the Baltic. In cooperation with the Amber Museum of the Historical Museum of the City of Gdańsk.

== External links (in German) ==
- "20 Jahre voller Leidenschaft". wn.de (Westpreußisches Landesmuseum: Dr. Lothar Hyss feiert Dienstjubiläum). 2 April 2018.
- "Kluger Sachwalter der Kultur Westpreußens". wn.de (Trauer um Museumsleiter Lothar Hyss). 8 April 2022.
- "Westpreußisches Landesmuseum". ostdeutsche-museen.de.
- "Nachruf des Westpreußischen Landesmuseums".
