= Schloss Weimar =

Palace in Weimar, Thuringia, Germany

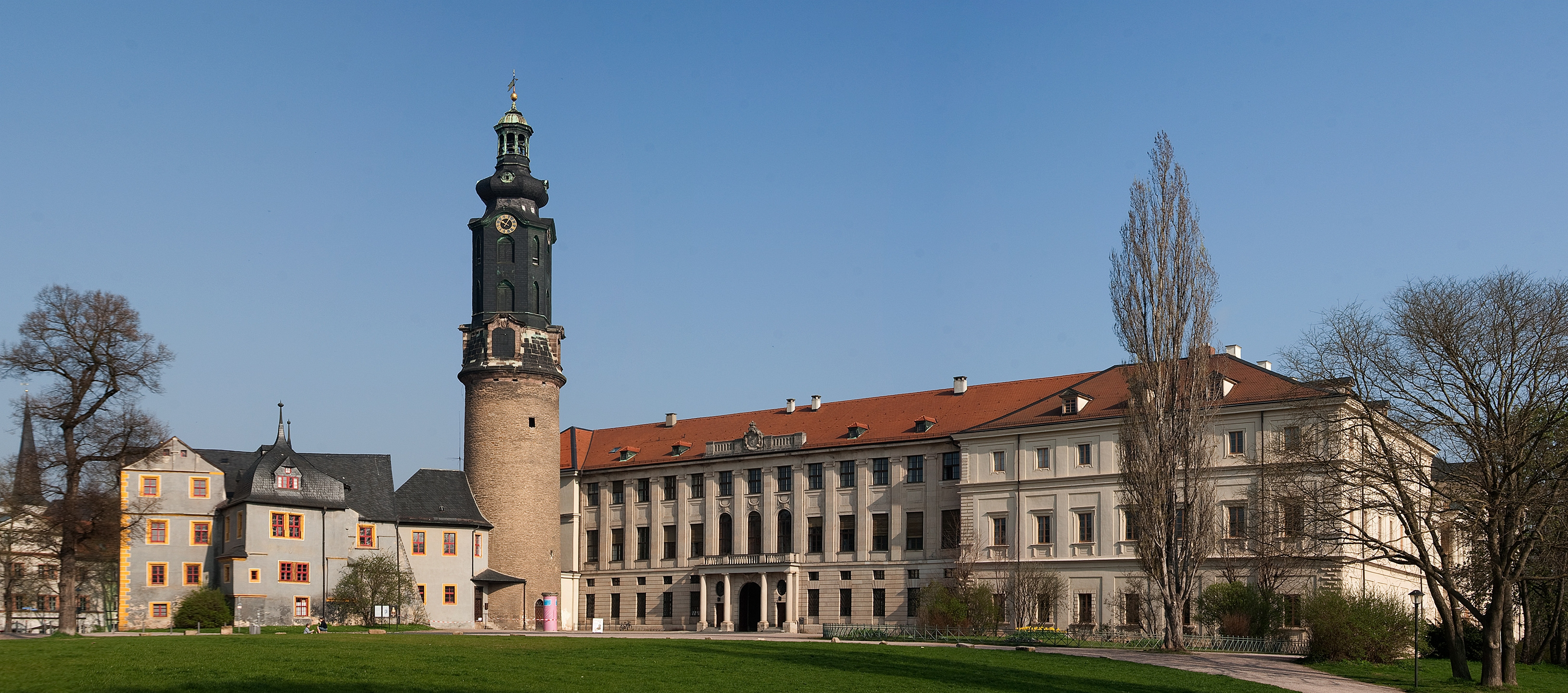
- View of the South wing, the tower, and the oldest part Bastille on the left
- Interactive map of the Schloss Weimar area
- Alternative names: Stadtschloss; Residenzschloss

General information
- Status: Museum
- Location: Weimar, Thuringia, Germany
- Coordinates: 50°58′49″N 11°19′56″E

Schloss Weimar is a Schloss (palace) in Weimar, Thuringia, Germany. It is now called Stadtschloss to distinguish it from other palaces in and around Weimar. The building is located at the north end of the town's park along the Ilm river, Park an der Ilm. It forms part of the World Heritage Site "Classical Weimar", along with other sites associated with Weimar's importance as a cultural hub during the late 18th and 19th centuries.

From the middle of the 16th century it was the residence of the Dukes of Saxe-Weimar and, after they inherited the Duchy of Saxe-Eisenach in 1741, of Saxe-Weimar and Eisenach, which became the Grand Duchy of Saxe-Weimar-Eisenach from 1809 until the German revolution of 1918–1919. Names in English include Palace at Weimar, Grand Ducal Palace, City Palace and City Castle.

In history, it was often destroyed by fire. The Baroque palace from the 17th century, with the church Schlosskirche where a number of works by Johann Sebastian Bach were premiered, was replaced by a Neoclassical structure after a fire in 1774. Four rooms were dedicated to the memory of poets who worked in Weimar, Johann Wolfgang von Goethe, Johann Gottfried Herder, Friedrich Schiller and Christoph Martin Wieland. From 1923, the building has housed the Schlossmuseum, a museum with a focus on paintings of the 15th and 16th centuries and works of art related to Weimar, a cultural centre.

== History ==
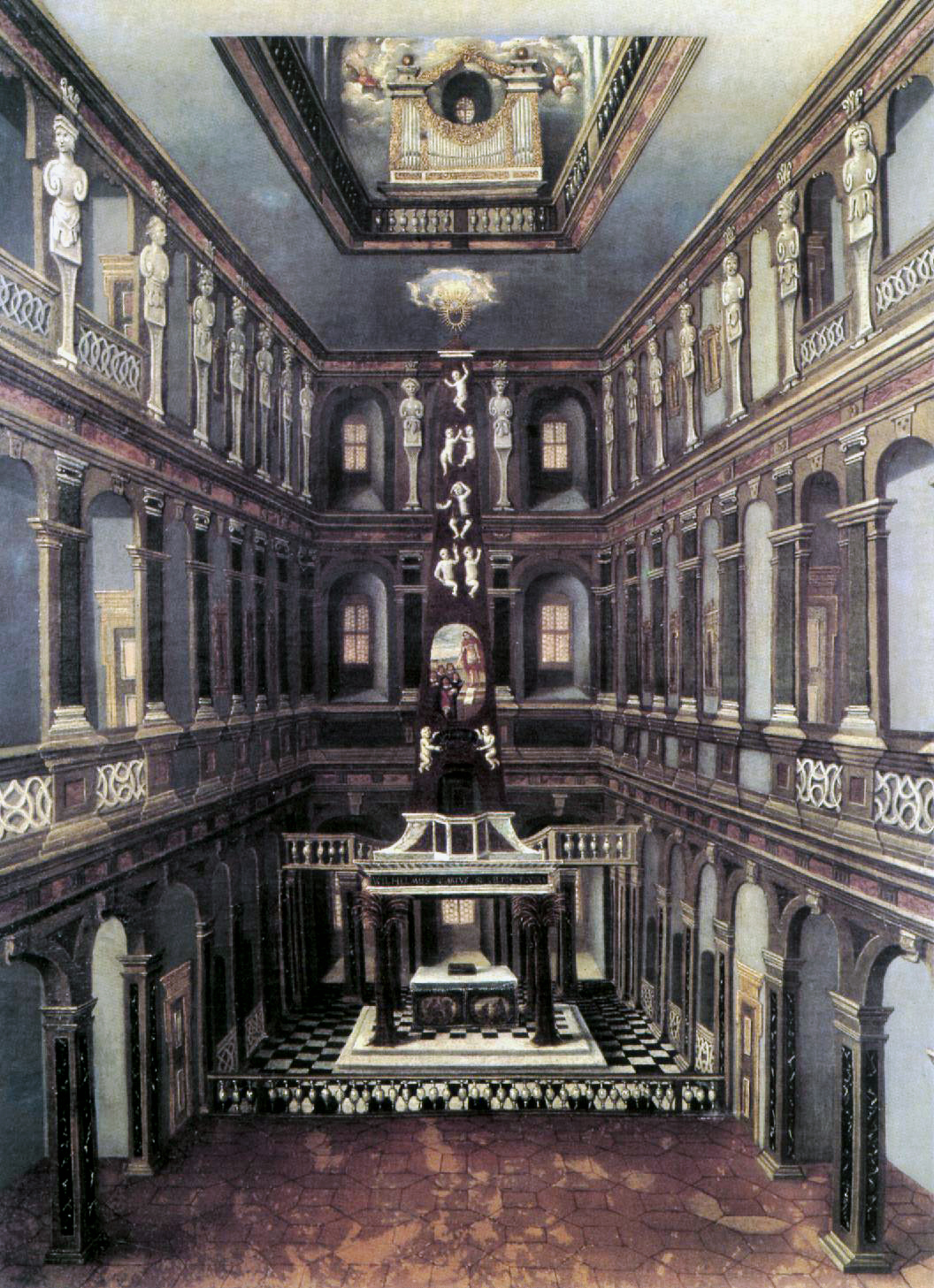
The Baroque Schlosskirche (court chapel), built 1619 to 1630, with the organ above the altar, by Christian Richter, c. 1660

The building has been developed over the past 500 years. The first building on the site was a medieval moated castle, which was first documented at the end of the 10th century. After a fire in 1424, and again from the mid-16th century, when Weimar became the permanent residence of the dukes, it was remodelled. After another fire in 1618, reconstruction began in 1619 planned by the Italian architects Giovanni Bonalino and Costantino de' Servi. The church was completed in 1630, where several works by Johann Sebastian Bach were premiered between 1708 and 1717. In the 1650s Johann Moritz Richter was engaged by Wilhelm, Duke of Saxe-Weimar to modify the design to a symmetrical Baroque structure with three wings, open to the south. After Wilhelm's death in 1662, the new building became known as the "Wilhelmsburg"; the chapel was called the "Himmelsburg".

Duchess Anna Amalia, a née Princess of Brunswick-Wolfenbüttel, as regent for her young son, made her court into a centre of arts. From 1771 to 1774 the theatre company of Abel Seyler was engaged by Duchess Anna Amalia as a permanent court theatre. The building was destroyed by fire in 1774, which forced the Seyler company to leave. Duke Carl August formed a commission for its reconstruction directed by Johann Wolfgang Goethe, who had arrived at the court in 1775. Architects Johann August Arens, Nikolaus Friedrich Thouret and Heinrich Gentz kept the former walls of the east and north wings and created a "classical" interior, especially the staircase and the banqueting hall (Festsaal). Decoration was supplied by sculptor Christian Friedrich Tieck. In 1816, Clemens Wenzeslaus Coudray began plans for the west wing, which was reopened in 1847 with a court chapel. The wing contained the so-called Dichterzimmer (poets' rooms), initiated by Grand Duchess Maria Pavlovna, a daughter of Russian Tsar Paul I. They commemorate Christoph Martin Wieland, Johann Gottfried Herder, Friedrich Schiller and Goethe. Thus, large parts of the palace have been preserved in the decorative state of Weimar Classicism. This was certainly not only due to the intellectual height of this era, but also to the fact that Grand Duke Charles Alexander (1853–1901) and his wealthy wife, Princess Sophie of the Netherlands, had the Wartburg near Eisenach extensively rebuilt as a national cultural monument in the Neo-Romanesque style during his long reign. This undoubtedly spared the palace from being furnished in a historicist style. However, from 1912 to 1914 a south wing was added under Grand Duke Wilhelm Ernst.

The Herder Room was restored in 2005, the restoration of the Goethe Room and the Wieland Room was completed in 2014.

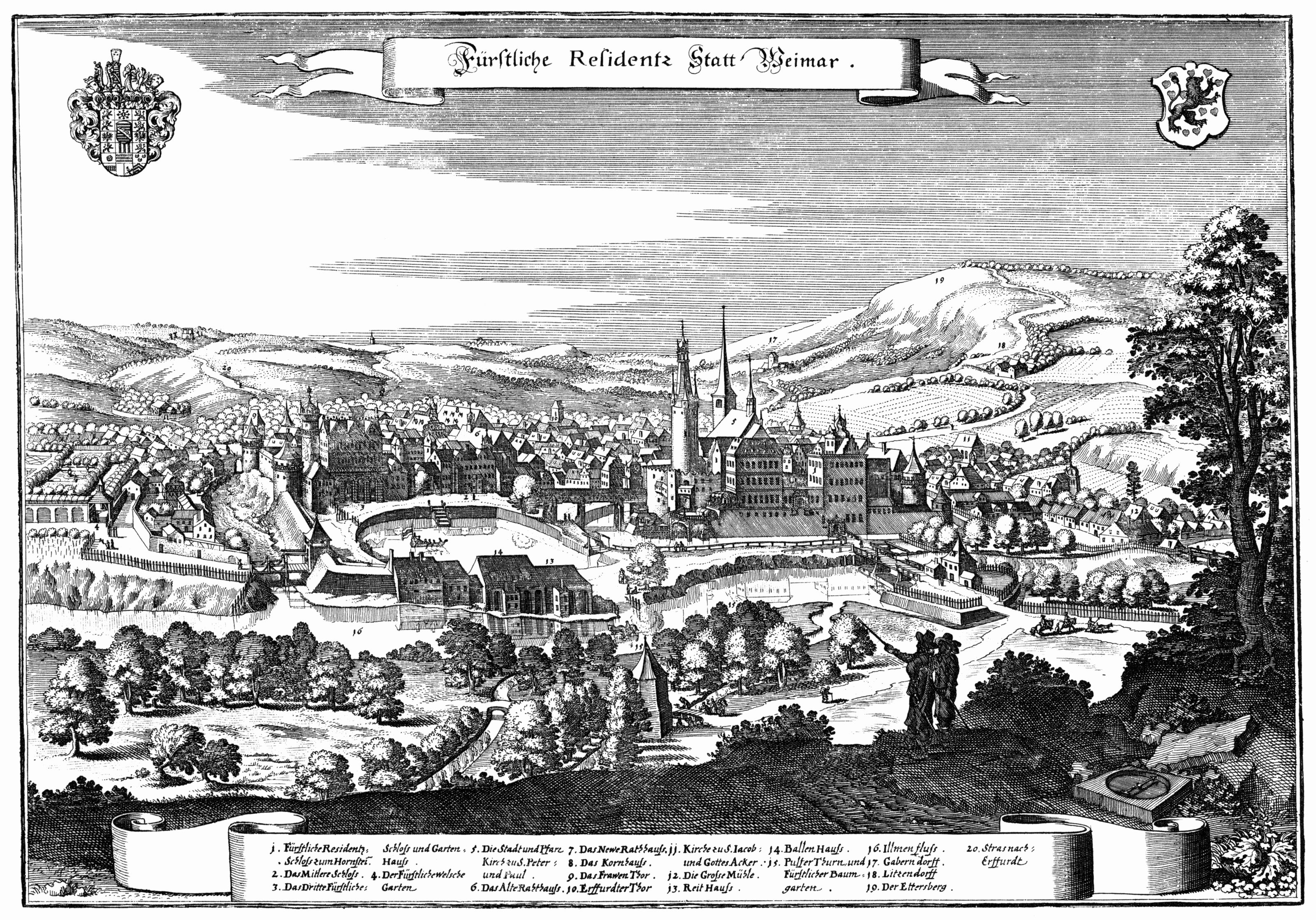
Town and Residenz around 1650

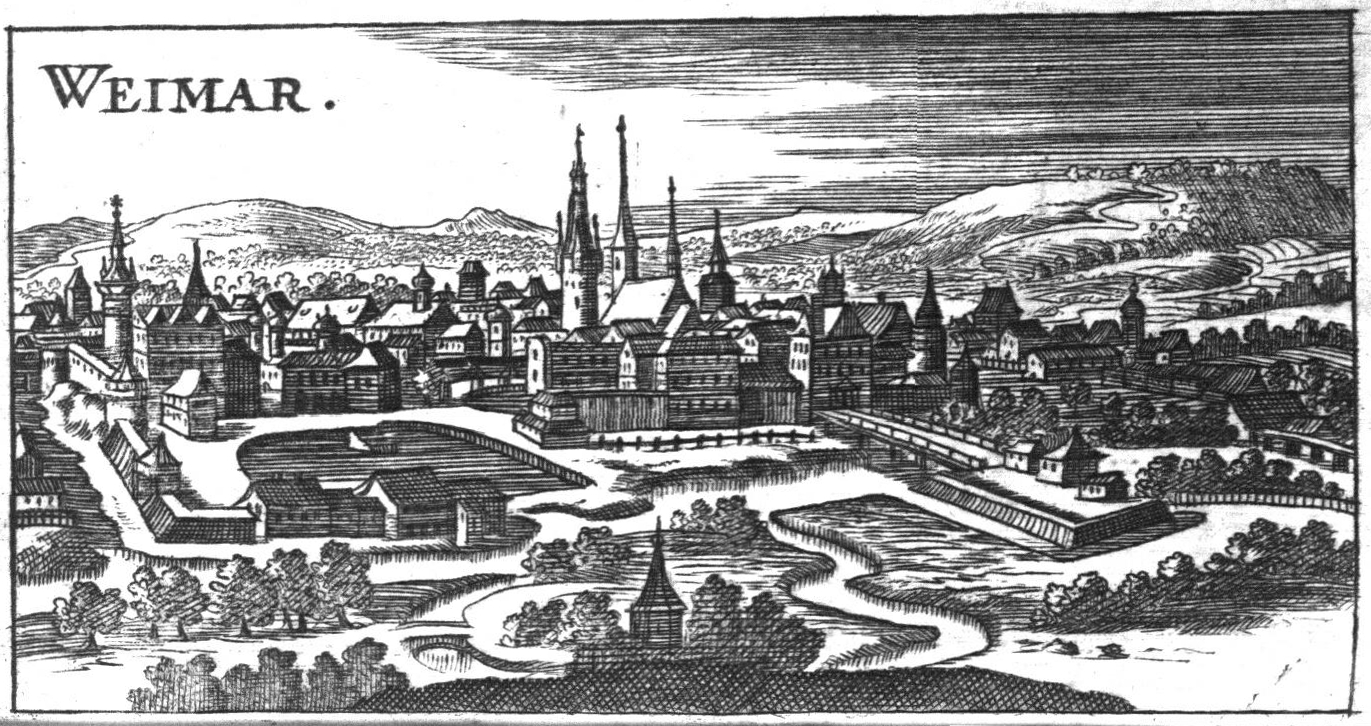
Town and Residenz around 1686

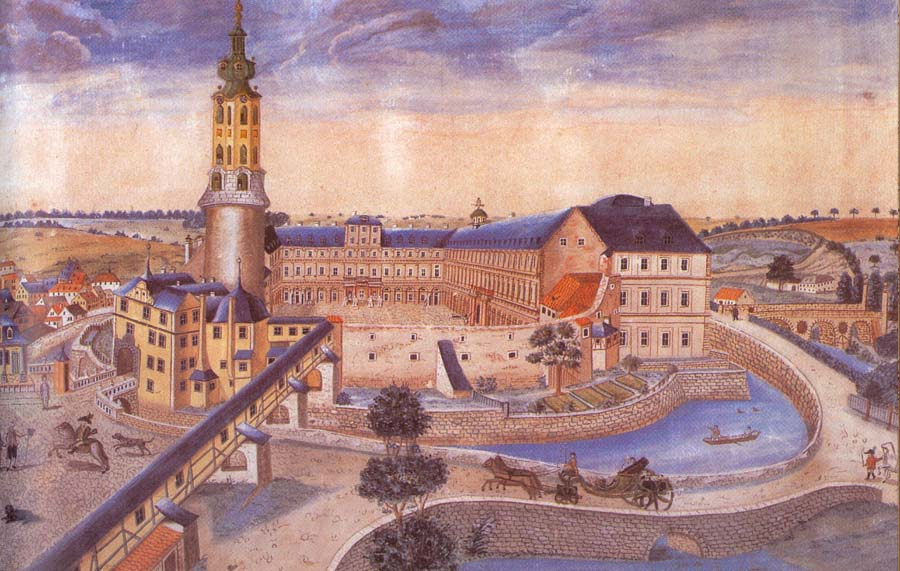
The Wilhelmsburg around 1730

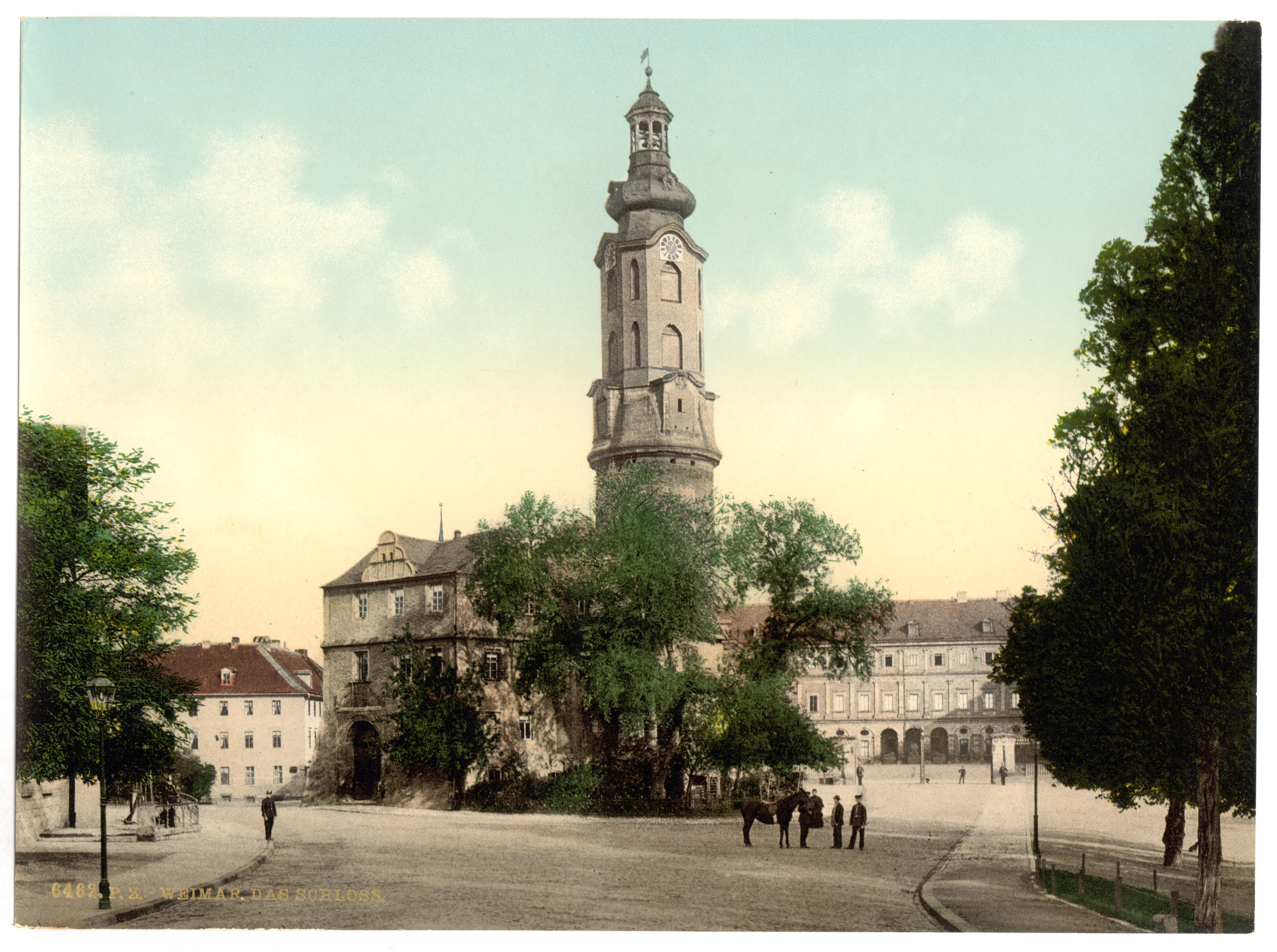
The Bastille around 1905

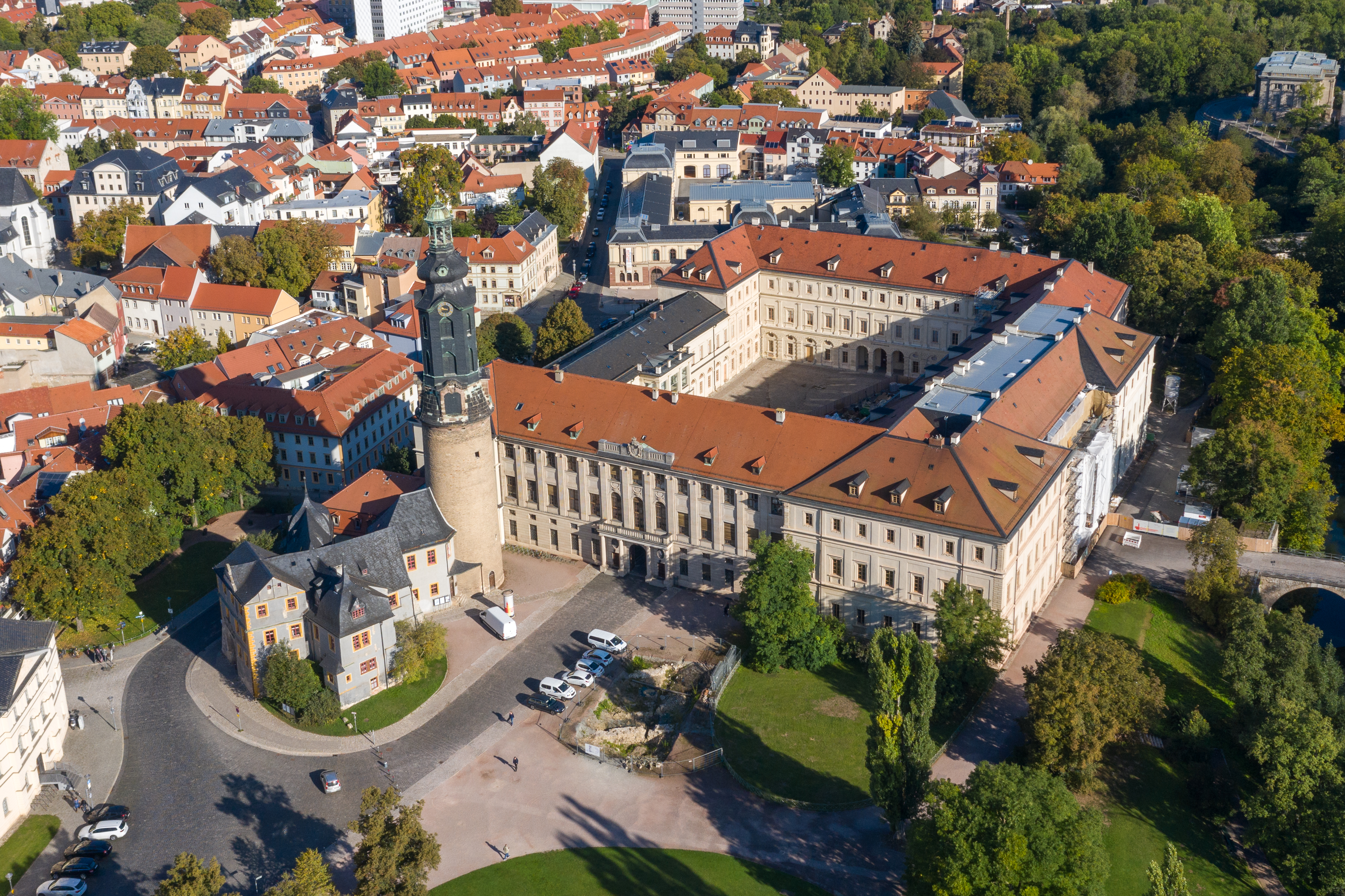
Aerial view

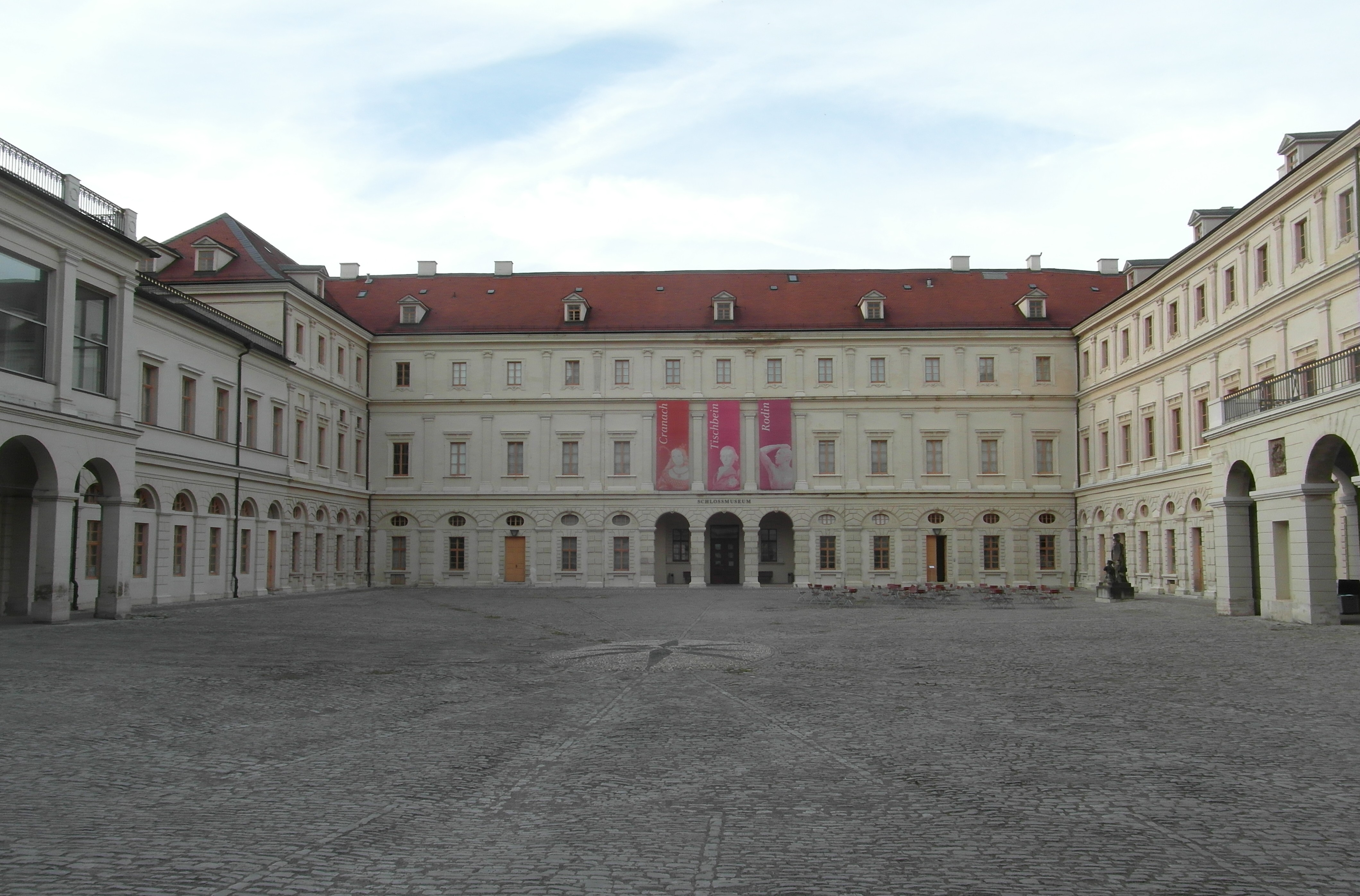
Court, seen from the south wing, 2014

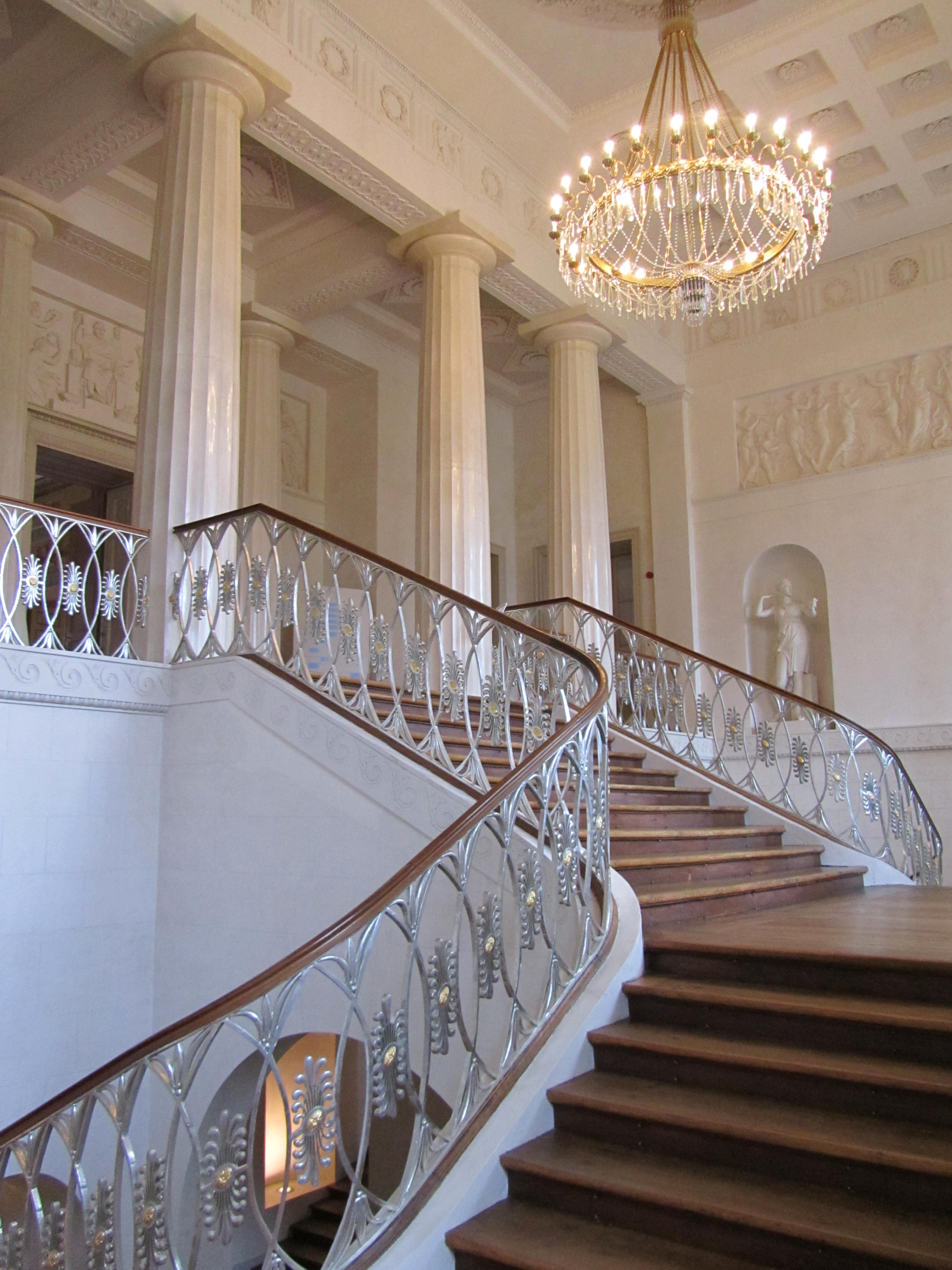
Staircase, 1801

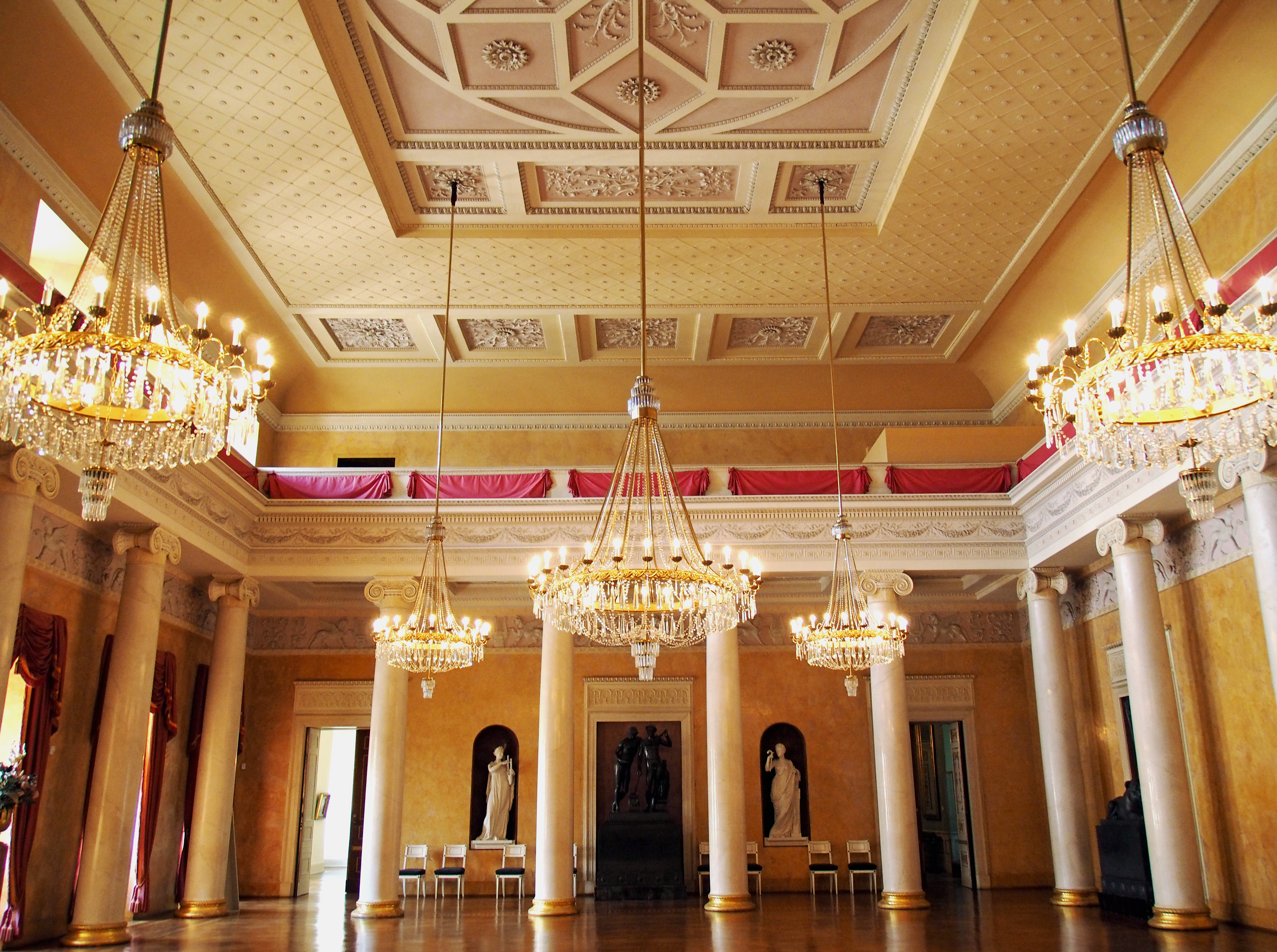
Ballroom

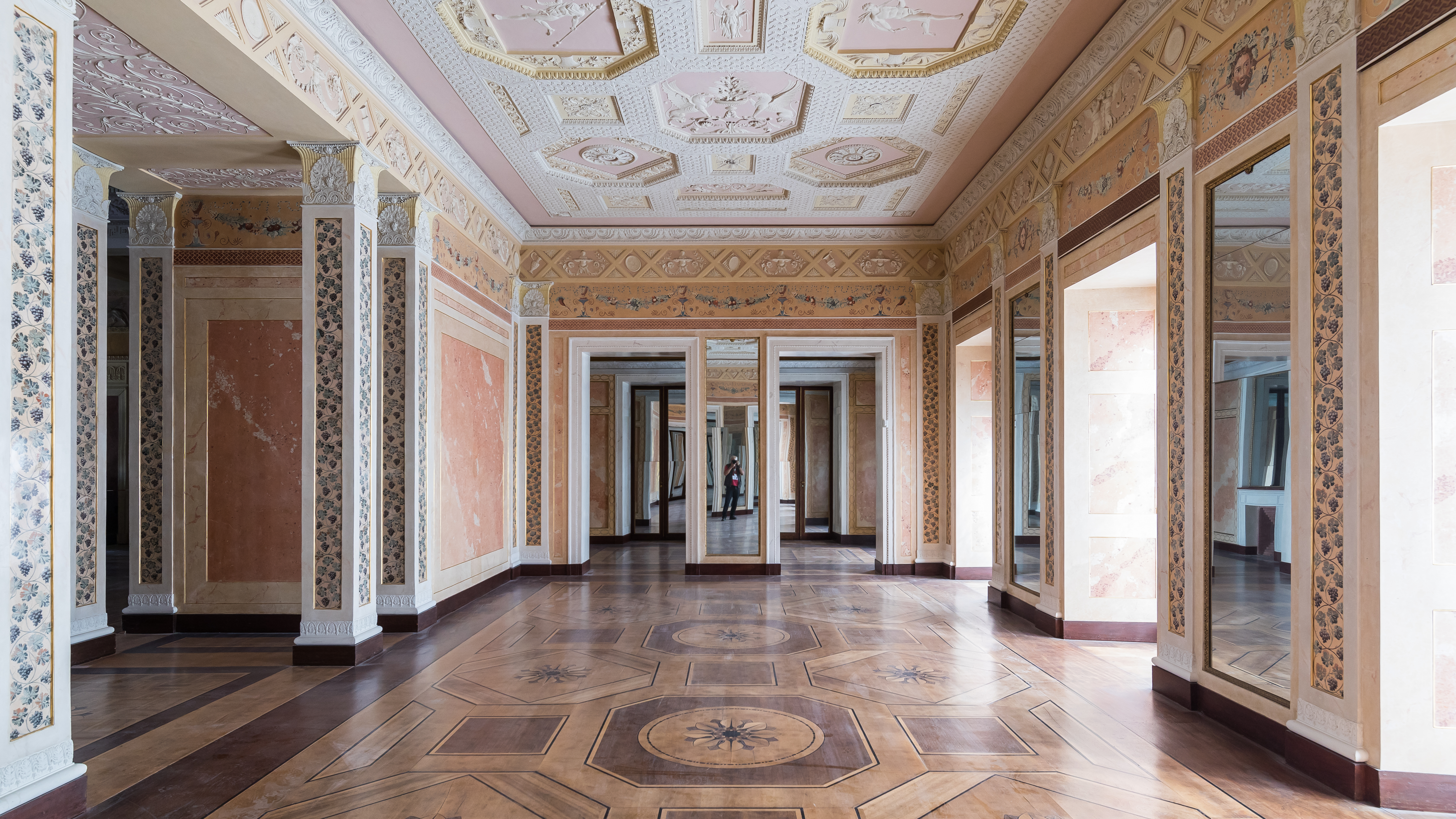
Mirror Gallery

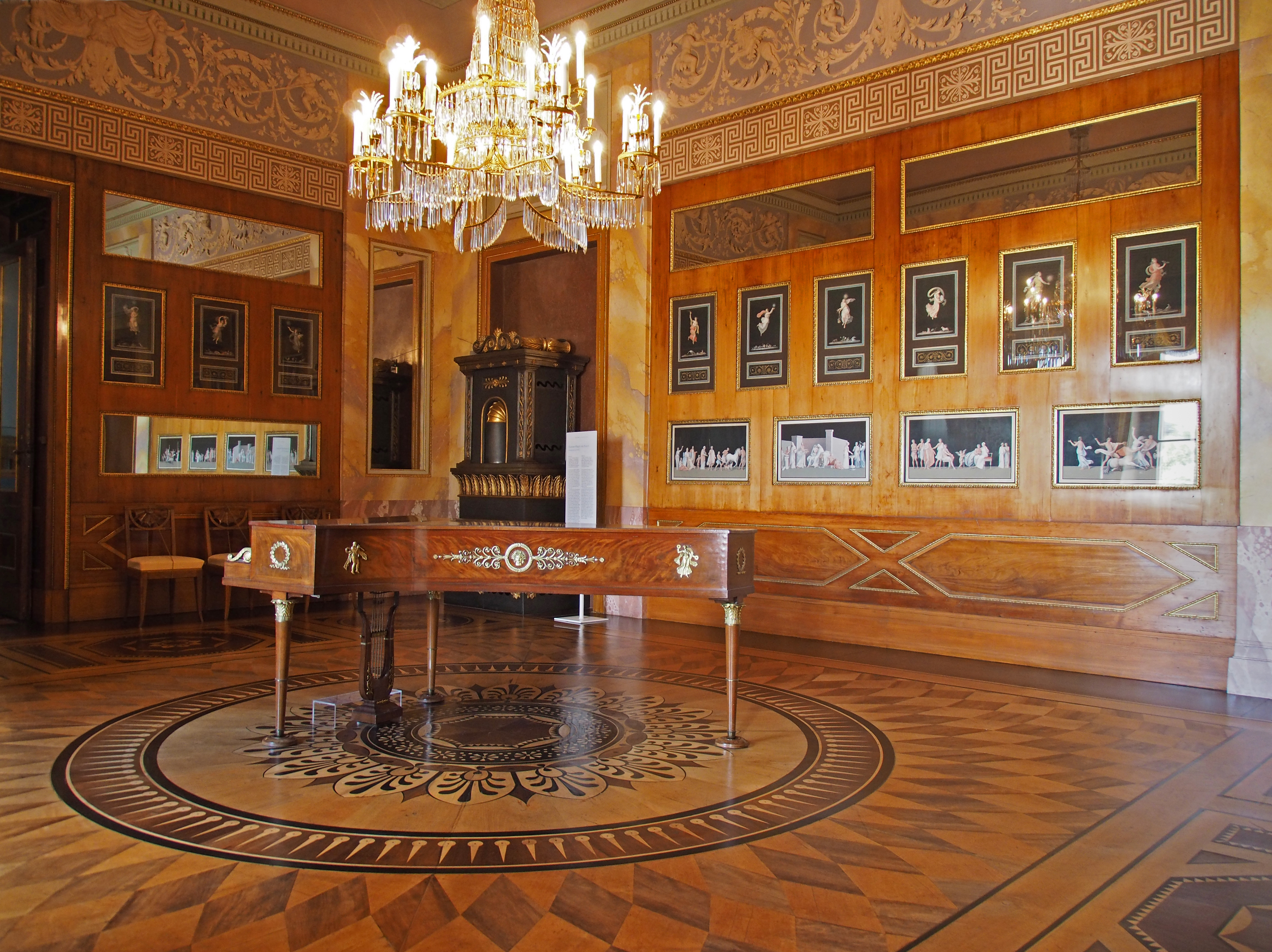
Ceder Room

== Museum ==
The building has been used as a museum since 1923. The Schlossmuseum presents exhibitions focused on paintings from 1500 to 1900 related to the history of Weimar. The ground floor holds paintings of the Renaissance, especially works by Lucas Cranach the Elder and Lucas Cranach the Younger, and medieval sacred art, the upper floor displays paintings of Goethe's period in representative rooms, and the top floor contains works of the 19th-century Weimarer Malerschule (Weimar School) and contemporary art.

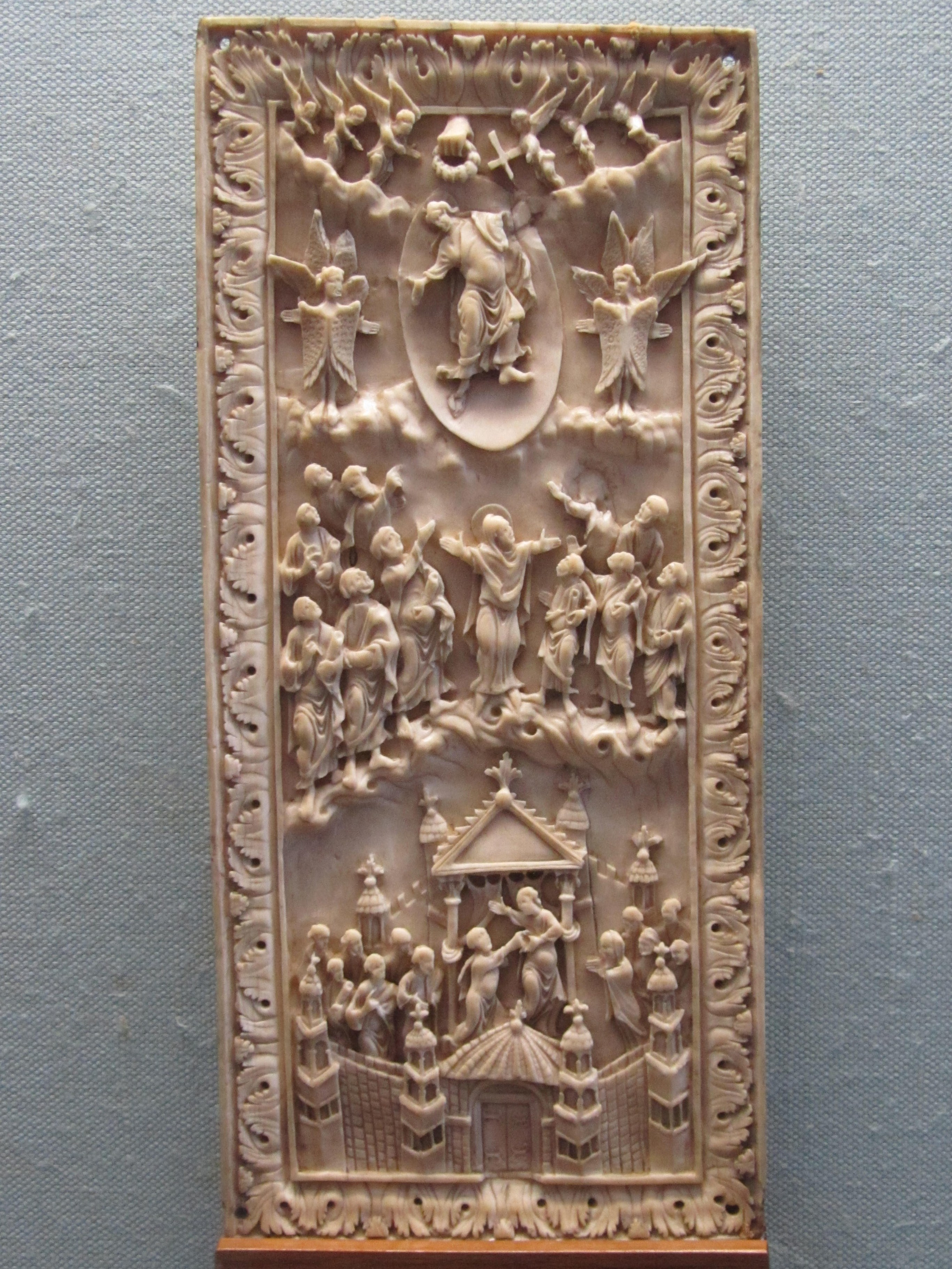
Carolingian ivory (9th century)

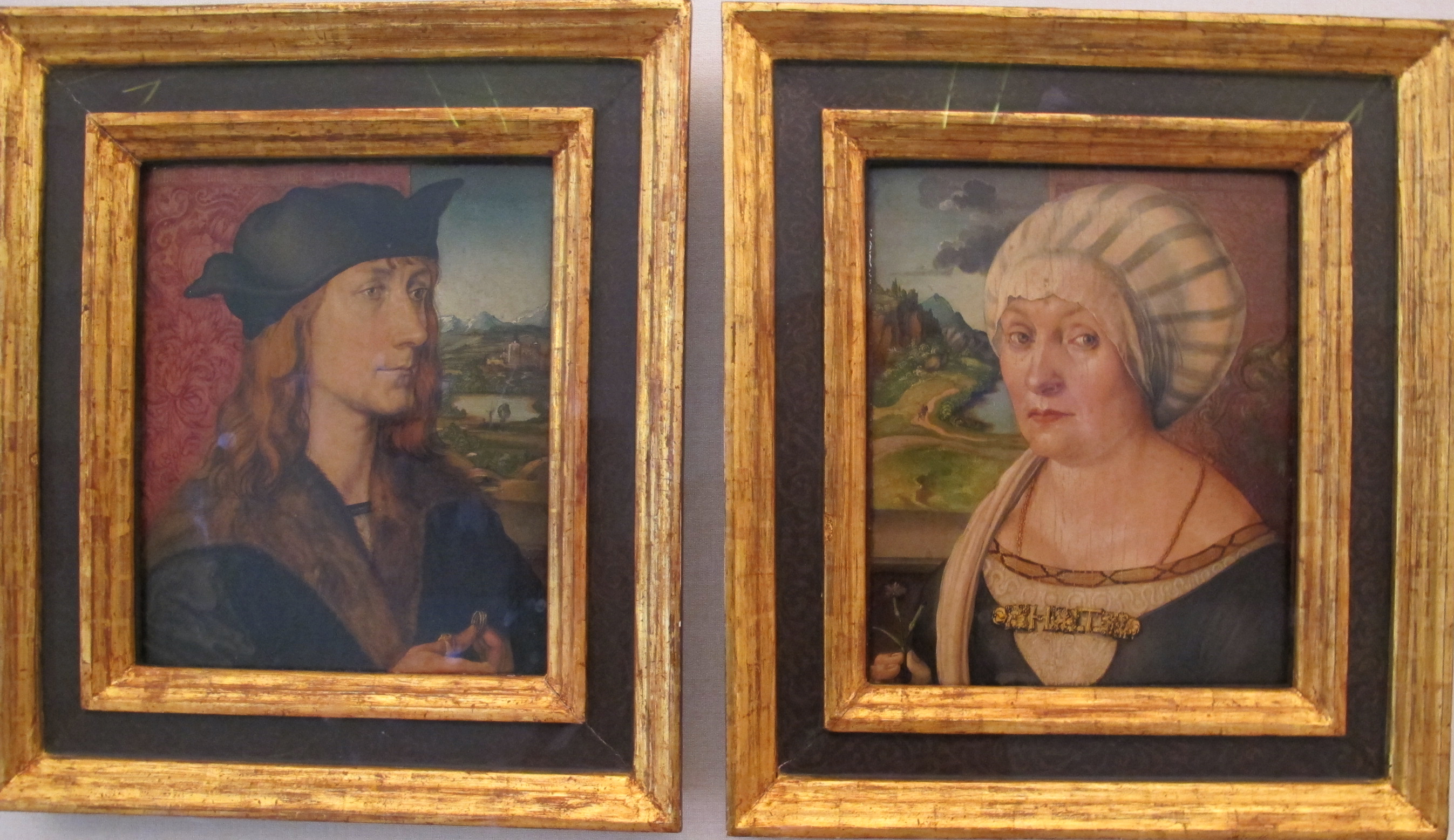
Albrecht Dürer: Hans and Felicitas Tucher (1499)

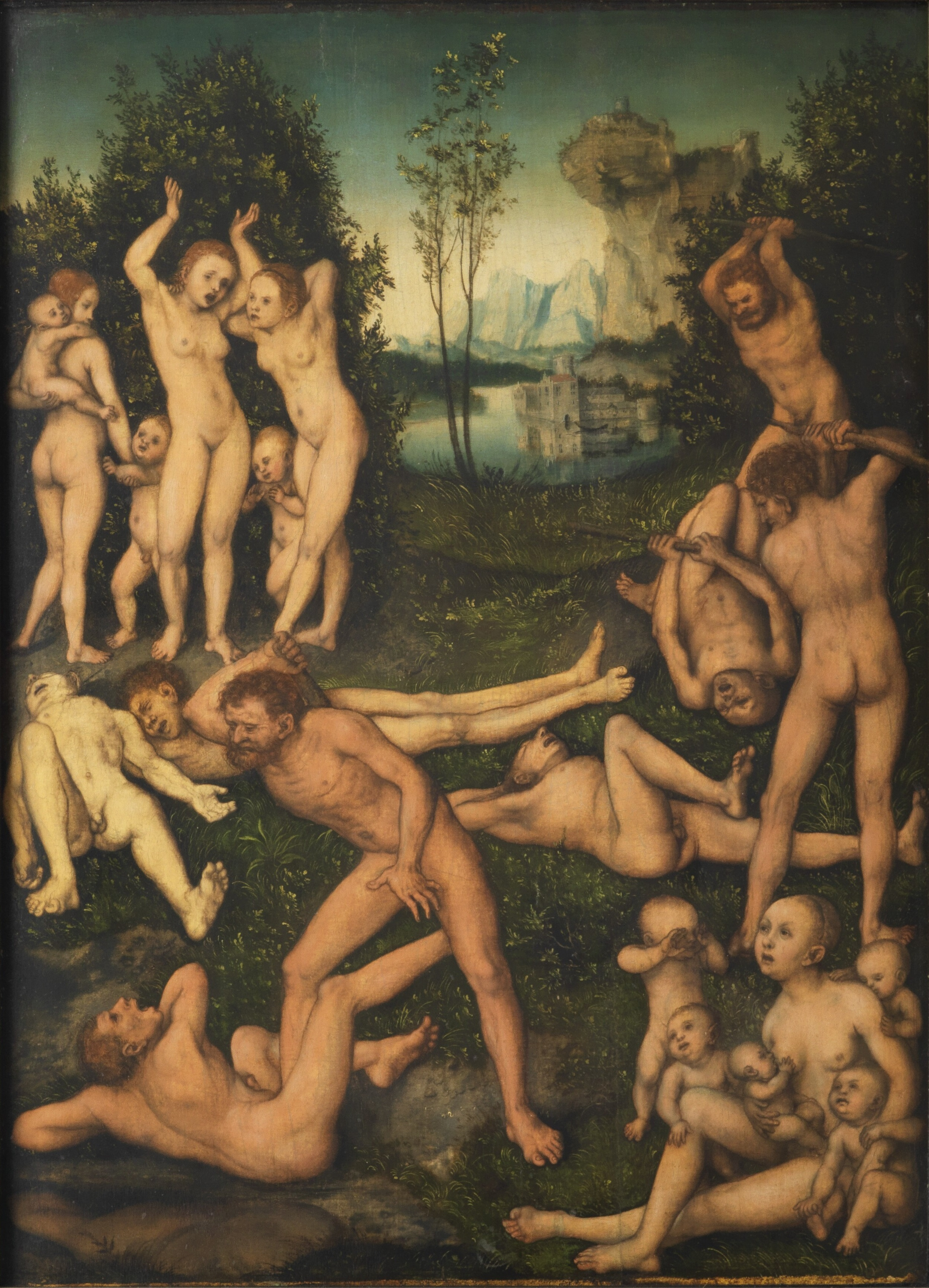
Lucas Cranach the Elder: Die Früchte der Eifersucht (1527)

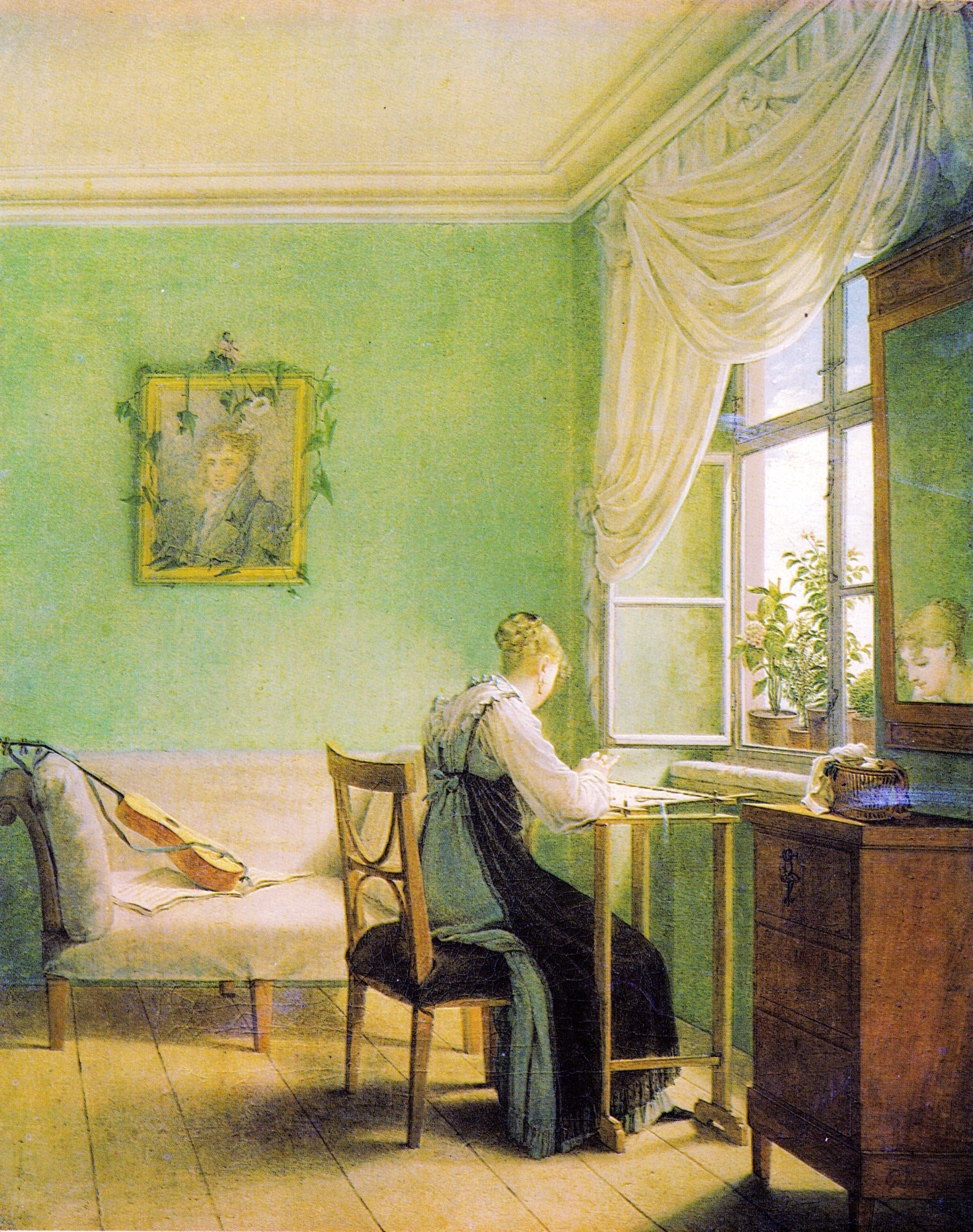
Georg Friedrich Kersting: Die Stickerin (1812)

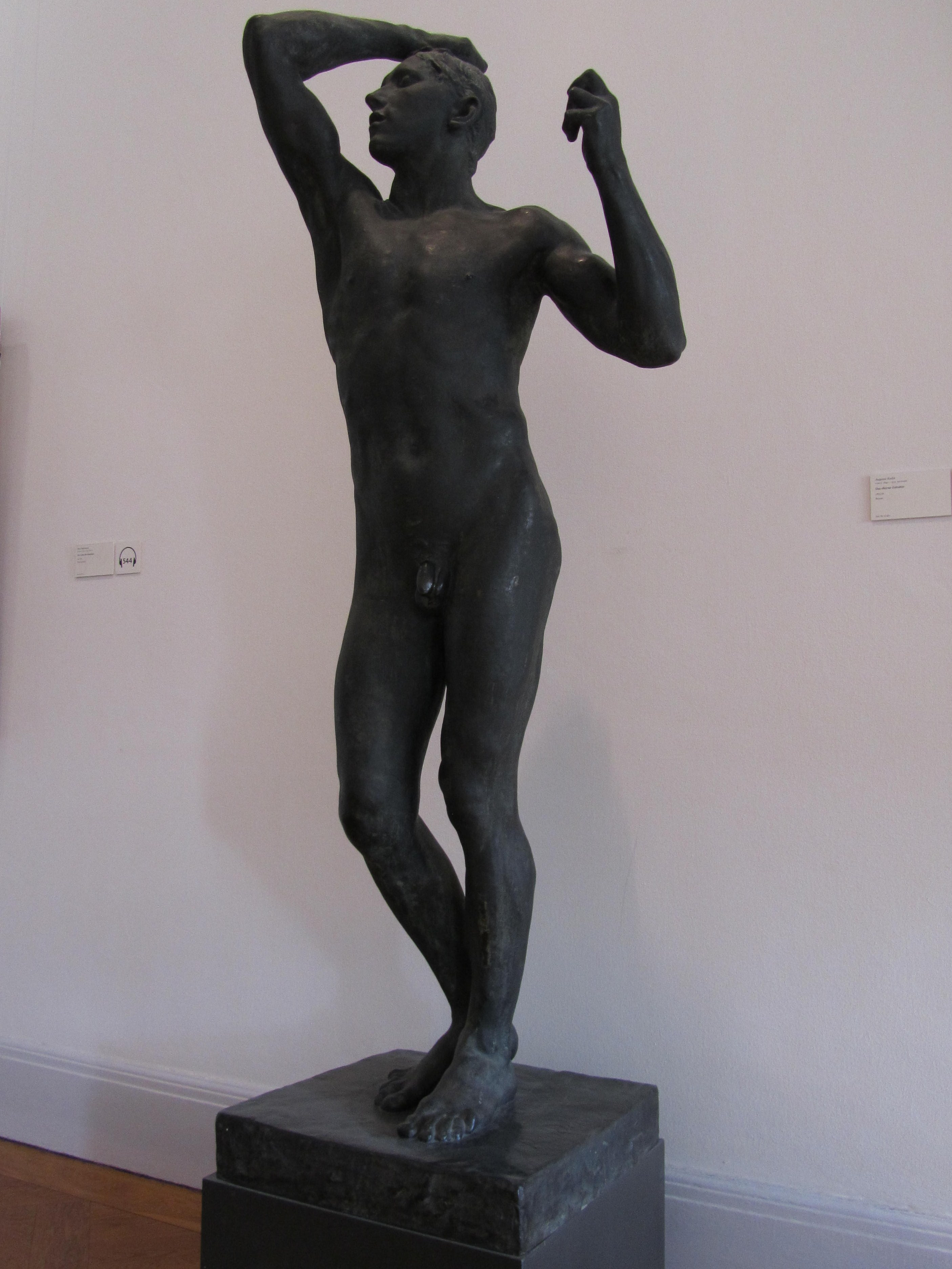
Auguste Rodin: Das eherne Zeitalter (1875/76)

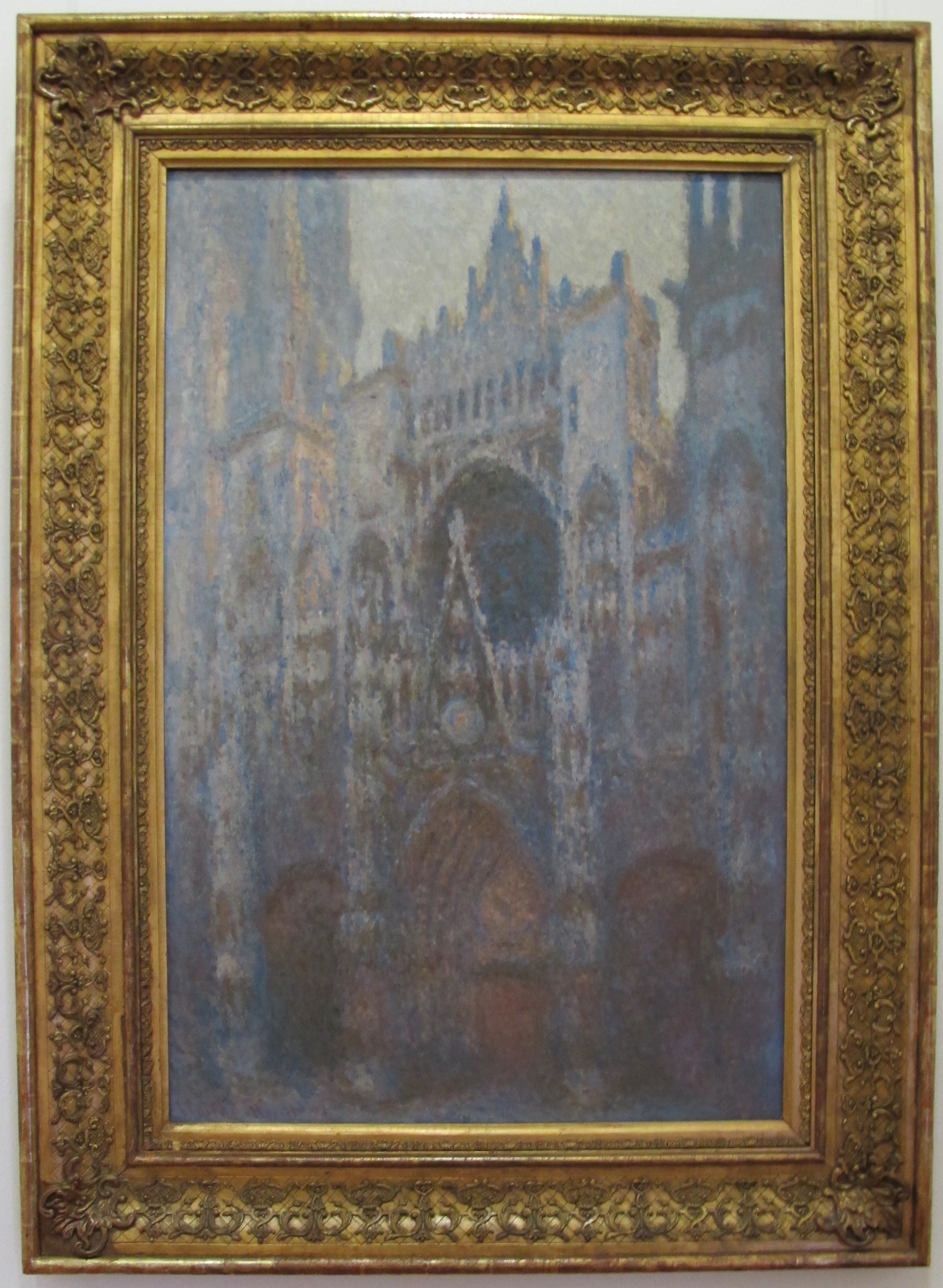
Claude Monet: The Cathedral of Rouen (1894)

Since 2008 the Klassik Stiftung Weimar has owned the site with the exception of the Bastille part, owned by the Stiftung Thüringer Schlösser und Gärten.

== Bibliography ==
(in German)

- Rolf Bothe: Dichter, Fürst und Architekten. Das Weimarer Residenzschloß vom Mittelalter bis zum Anfang des 19. Jahrhunderts. Ostfildern-Ruit 2000.
- Residenzschloss Weimar. 15 Jahre – 15 Millionen Investitionen. Die Grundsanierung in 15 Jahren durch die Stiftung Thüringer Schlösser und Gärten. Imhof-Verlag, Petersberg 2009.
- Christian Hecht: Dichtergedächtnis und fürstliche Repräsentation. Der Westflügel des Weimarer Residenzschlosses. Architektur und Ausstattung. Ostfildern 2000.
- Roswitha Jacobsen (Hrsg.): Residenzschlösser in Thüringen: kulturhistorische Porträts. Quartus-Verlag, Bucha 1998.
- Willi Stubenvoll: Schlösser in Thüringen: Schlösser, Burgen, Gärten, Klöster und historische Anlagen der Stiftung Thüringer Schlösser und Gärten. Verl. Ausbildung + Wissen, Bad Homburg 1997.
- Adolph Doebber: Das Schloss in Weimar : seine Geschichte vom Brande 1774 bis zur Wiederherstellung 1804. Fischer, Jena 1911.
